= Ecce Homo (disambiguation) =

"Ecce homo" (Latin: "Behold the Man"), is a phrase traditionally attributed to Pontius Pilate at the trial of Jesus.

Ecce Homo may also refer to:

== Art ==
- Ecce Homo (Antonello da Messina), a series of paintings of the 1470s by Antonello da Messina
- Ecce Homo (Bosch, 1470s), a painting of the 1470s by Hieronymus Bosch
- Ecce Homo (Bosch, 1490s), a painting of the 1490s by Hieronymus Bosch or a follower
- Ecce Homo (Luini), a painting of c. 1500–1532 by Bernardino Luini
- Ecce Homo (Mantegna), a painting of c. 1500 by Andrea Mantegna
- Ecce Homo (Titian), or Christ Carrying the Cross, a painting of 1505 attributed either to Titian or to Giorgione
- Ecce Homo (Correggio), or Christ Presented to the People, a painting of c. 1526 by Antonio da Correggio
- Ecce Homo (Titian, Vienna), a painting of 1543 by Titian
- Ecce Homo (statue), a statue of c. 1600 by an unknown artist
- Ecce Homo (Caravaggio, Genoa), a painting of c. 1605–1606 by Caravaggio
- Ecce Homo (Caravaggio, Madrid), a painting of c. 1605–1609 in Caravaggio
- Christ Presented to the People, or Ecce Homo, a drypoint print of 1655 by Rembrandt
- Ecce Homo (Daumier), a painting of 1850 by Honoré Daumier
- Ecce Homo (Juan Luna), a painting of 1896 by Juan Luna
- Ecce homo (Martínez and Giménez, Borja), a fresco of c. 1930 by Elías García Martínez known for its failed restoration attempt
- Ecce Homo, a sculpture of 1999 by Mark Wallinger, the first to appear on the Fourth Plinth in Trafalgar Square, London
- Ecce Homo (exhibition), a touring photography exhibition of 1998–2004

== Literature ==
- Ecce Homo! Or, A Critical Inquiry into the History of Jesus Christ; Being a Rational Analysis of the Gospels, a book by Baron d'Holbach
- Idou o anthropos or Ecce Homo, an 1886 book by Andreas Laskaratos
- Ecce Homo (book), an autobiography by Friedrich Nietzsche, written in 1888 and published in 1908
- "Ecce homo", an essay by John Robert Seeley

== Music ==
- Ecce Homo (Grant Hart album), 1994
- Ecce Homo (The Hidden Cameras album), 2001
- "Ecce homo", a song by Serge Gainsbourg from Mauvaises Nouvelles des Étoiles
- "Ecce homo", a song by Titus Andronicus from Local Business
- "Ecce Homo", the theme tune from Mr. Bean
- "Ecce Homo", a composition for cord orchestra, music by Jacques Charpentier, 2 dancer ballet by Joseph Lazzini
- ”Ecce Homo”, a song by Oxbow from Thin Black Duke
- Ecce Homo, the name of the original draft of the album Everything Will Be Alright in the End by Weezer

== Other uses ==
- Ecce Homo (church), a church on Via Dolorosa in the Old City of Jerusalem

== See also ==
- ECCE (disambiguation)
- Homo (disambiguation)
