= Ecce homo =

Biblical phrase and subject in art

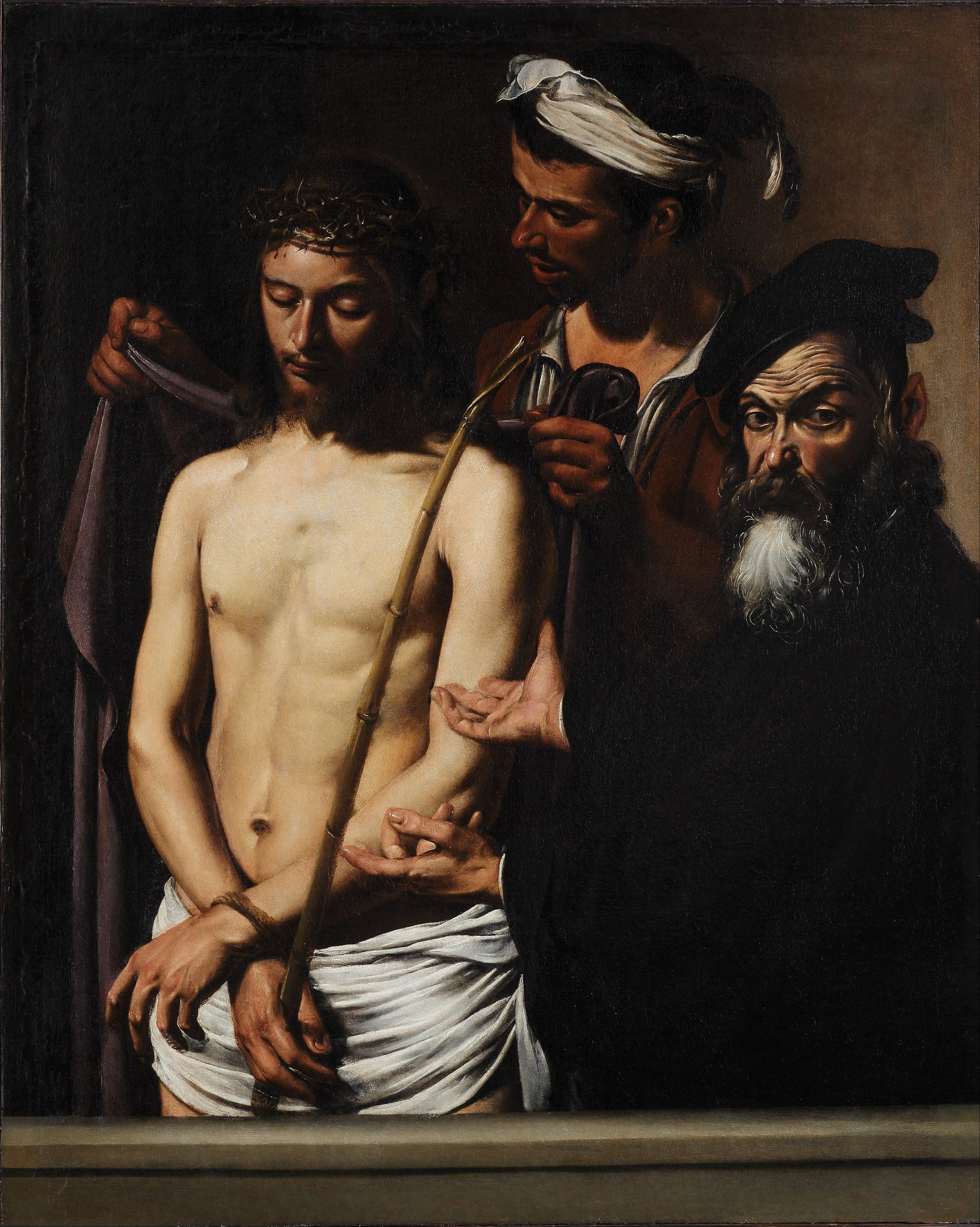
Ecce Homo, Caravaggio, 1605

Ecce homo (/ˈɛksi ˈhoʊmoʊ/, Ecclesiastical Latin: [ˈettʃe ˈomo], Classical Latin: [ˈɛkkɛ ˈhɔmoː]; "behold the man") are the Latin words used by Pontius Pilate in the Vulgate translation of the Gospel of John, when he presents a scourged Jesus, bound and crowned with thorns, to a hostile crowd shortly before his crucifixion (John 19:5). The original New Testament Greek: "ἰδοὺ ὁ ἄνθρωπος", romanized: "idoù ho ánthropos", is rendered by most English Bible translations, e.g. the Douay-Rheims Bible and the King James Version, as "behold the man". (Note: John 19:5: ἰδοὺ ὁ ἄνθρωπος, romanized: idoú ho ánthropos (NA28), ecce homo (NVUL), lit. 'behold the man'. Similar: Matthew 25:6: ἰδοὺ ὁ νυμφίος, romanized: idoù ho nymphíos (NA28), ecce sponsus (NVUL), lit. 'behold the bridegroom'.) The scene has been widely depicted in Christian art.

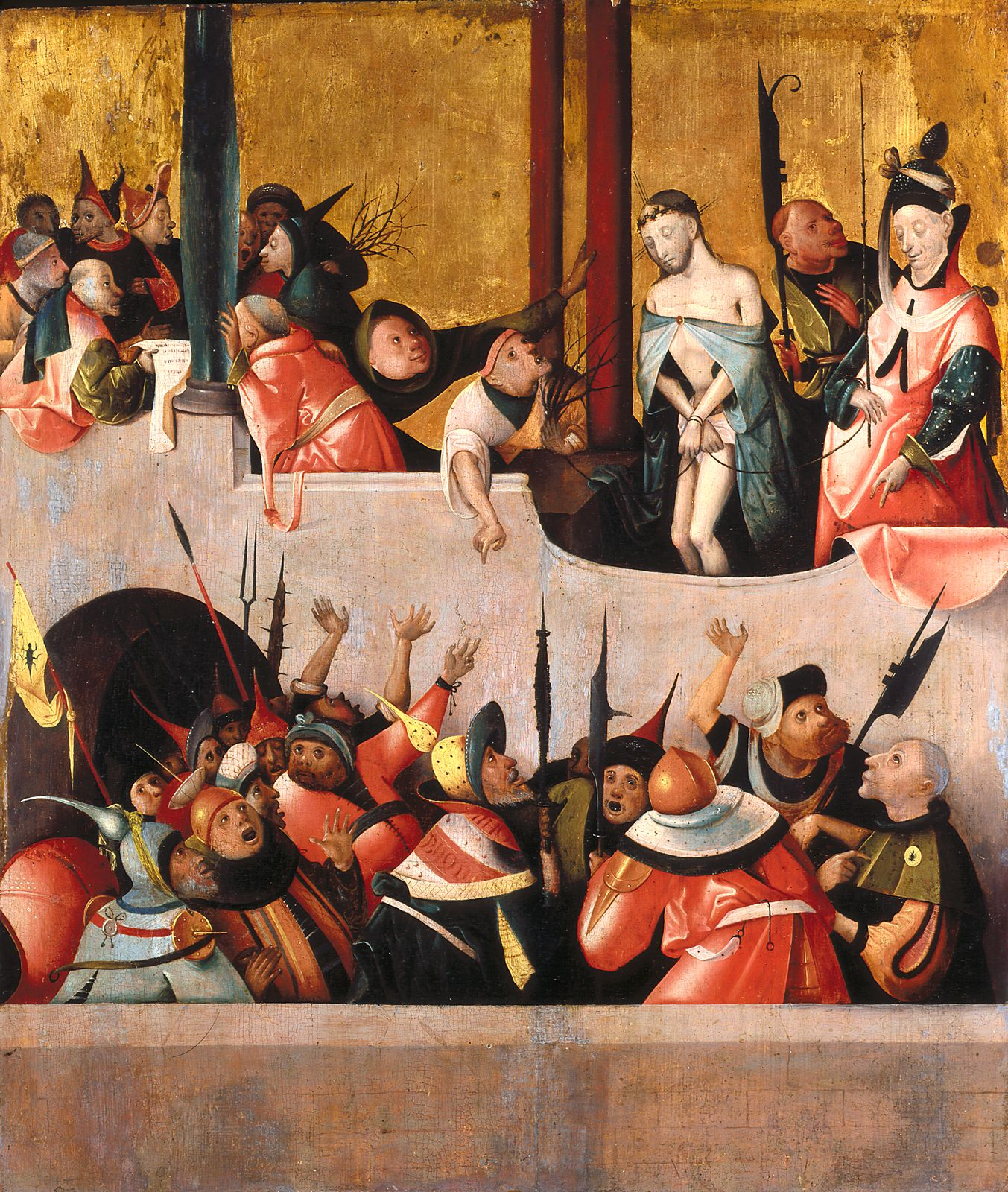
Version by a follower of Hieronymus Bosch, 1490s

A scene of the ecce homo is a standard component of cycles illustrating the Passion and life of Christ in art. It follows the stories of the Flagellation of Christ, the crowning with thorns and the mocking of Jesus, the last two often being combined. (Note: Matthew 27:27–31: […] ἐνέπαιξαν αὐτῷ, romanized: enépaizan autõ (NA28), illudebant ei (NVUL), lit. 'they mocked him' […]. — "The reed is a Christian symbol of humility […]. After whipping Christ and crowning him with thorns, the Roman soldiers gave Christ a reed as pathetic scepter for a mock ruler. In Christian iconography, the reed is a sign of Jesus's willingness to suffer humiliation to fulfill the will of his Father. […] [T]he humility is the absolute requirement for advancement in the spiritual life.") The usual depiction shows Pilate and Jesus, a mocking crowd which may be rather large, and parts of the city of Jerusalem.

But, from the 15th century in the West, and much earlier in the art of the Eastern church, devotional pictures began to portray Jesus alone, in half or full figure with a purple robe, loincloth, crown of thorns and torture wounds, especially on his head, and later became referred to as images of the Ecce homo. Similar subjects but with the wounds of the crucifixion visible (nail wounds on the limbs, spear wounds on the sides), are termed a Man of Sorrows (also Misericordia). If the instruments of the Passion are present, it may be called an Arma Christi. If Christ is sitting down (usually supporting himself with his hand on his thigh), it may be referred to it as Christ at rest or Pensive Christ. It is not always possible to distinguish these subjects.

== Eastern Christianity ==
Narrative scenes of the biblical moment are almost never shown in Eastern art, but icons of the single figure of the tortured Christ go back over a millennium, and have sometimes been called Ecce homo images by later sources. The first depictions of the ecce homo scene in the arts appear in the 9th and 10th centuries in the Syrian-Byzantine culture of the Antiochian Greek Christians. (Note: Eastern Orthodox Christianity in Syria is not to be confused with Syriac Christianity: "The Syrian Church has never had its own tradition of icon-painting. […] As to the non-Chalcedonian Orient, in particular the Church of Syria, icons did not find much acceptance there, and the churches were adorned with ornaments rather than icons." Antiochian representatives: (Note: "'… the disciples were called Christians first in Antioch. (Acts 11:26)'"): "Official motto" (JPEG image). The Antiochian Diocese of Los Angeles and the West. Archived from the original on 24 February 2018.; "Christ the Bridegroom" (JPEG image). The Antiochian Diocese of Los Angeles and the West. Archived from the original on 11 June 2016. (Note: "At the first service of Palm Sunday evening, the priest carries the icon of Christ the Bridegroom in procession, and we sing the 'Hymn of the Bridegroom'. We behold Christ as the Bridegroom of the Church, bearing the marks of His suffering, yet preparing a marriage Feast for us in God's Kingdom. […] The Parable of the Ten Virgins is read on Holy Tuesday. […] The theme of the day is reinforced by the expostelarion hymn we sing:" I behold Thy bridal chamber richly adorned, O my Savior; but I have no wedding garment to worthily enter. Make radiant the garment of my soul, O Giver of Light, and save me.); "Das Bräutigam-Gebet" – "The Bridegroom Prayer" on Facebook (Video). 2 April 2018. Retrieved 3 April 2019. Arabic: بطريركية أنطاكية وسائر المشرق للروم الأرثوذكس | كنيسة الروم الأرثوذكس في فيينا - النمسا, romanized: bitrirkiat 'antakiat wasayir almashriq lilruwm al'arthudhikus | kanisat alruwm al'arthudhikus fi fiyinna – alnamsa. German: Griechisch-Orthodoxes Patriarchat von Antiochien und dem gesamten Morgenland Griechisch-orthodoxe Kirche in Wien – Österreich, lit. 'Greek Orthodox Patriarchate of Antioch and All the East Greek Orthodox Church in Vienna – Austria.' (Note: "Realizing our sinfulness and not relying on the power of our own prayers, in this prayer we ask […] the Mother of God, Who has special grace to save us sinners by Her intercession for us before Her Son, to pray for us sinners before our Saviour." (Russian: "Сознавая свою греховность и не надеясь на силу молитв своих, мы в этой молитве просим помолиться о нас грешных, пред Спасителем нашим, […] Божию Матерь, имеющую особенную благодать спасать нас грешных Своим заступничеством за нас перед Сыном Своим."). (Note: Internet edition at Dorogadomoj.com.)) Behold, the Bridegroom cometh at midnight, ها هوذا الختن يأتي في نصف الليل and blessed is the servant فطوبى للعبد whom he shall find awake. الذي يجده مستيقظا، But he whom he shall find neglectful أما الذي يجده متغافلا فهو is verily unworthy. غيرمستحق. Behold, therefore, O my soul, beware, فانظري يا نفسي lest thou fallest in deep slumber, ألا تستغرقي في النوم and the door of the kingdom ويغلق عليك خارج be closed against thee, الملكوت and thou be delivered to death. وتسلمي إلى الموت، But be thou wakeful, crying: بل كوني منتبهة صارخة : Holy, holy, holy art thou, O God. قدوس قدوس قدوس أنت يا الله، Through the intercessions of the Theotokos, من أجل والدة الإله have mercy on us. ارحمنا.; Cf. Isaiah 6:3: "Holy, holy, holy, is the LORD of hosts: the whole earth is full of his glory", Revelation 4:8: "Holy, holy, holy, LORD God Almighty, which was, and is, and is to come", Trisagion, and Jesus Prayer.)

Eastern Orthodox tradition generally refers to this type of icon by a different title: (Note: Even if the icon inscription is Behold the Man.) ″Jesus Christ the Bridegroom″ (Byzantine Greek: Ιηϲοῦϲ Χριστόϲ ὁ Νυμφίος, romanized: Iesoũs Christós ho Nymphíos). (Note: "The icon of Christ the Bridegroom portrays the selfless love for Christ's Bride, the Church (Isaiah 54). He is dressed in royal colors as the betrothed King, complying with Sacred Scripture's account of His mockery by the Roman guards before His crucifixion. The crown is a symbol of His marriage to the Church; the rope, a symbol of bondage to sin, death and corruption which Jesus untied by His death on the Cross; the reed, a symbol of His humility.") It derives from the words in New Testament Greek: "ἰδοὺ ὁ νυμφίος", romanized: "idoù ho nymphíos", by which Jesus Christ reveals himself, in his Parable of the Ten Virgins according to the Gospel of Matthew, as the bearer of the most high joy. (Note: Russian: "Христос открывает Себя Носителем высшей радости", romanized: Khristos otkryvayet Sebya Nositelem vysshey radosti, lit. 'Christ reveals Himself as the Bearer of the highest joy'.)

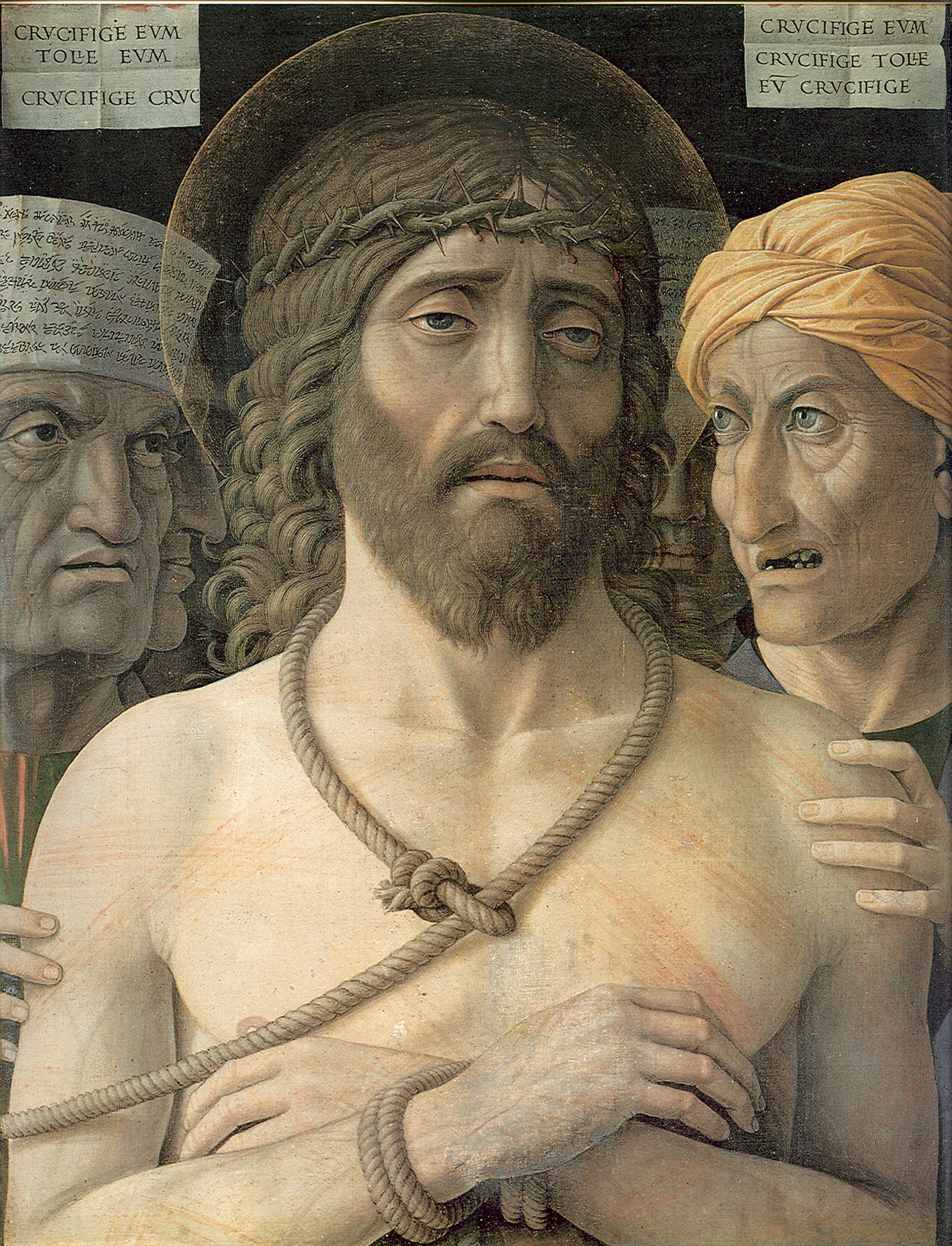
Ecce Homo, Andrea Mantegna, 1500

The icon presents the bridegroom as a suffering Christ, mocked and humiliated by Pontius Pilate's soldiers before his crucifixion.

The daily Midnight Office summons the faithful to be ready at all times for the day of the Dread Judgement, which will come unexpectedly like "a bridegroom in the night". (Note: Church Slavonic: "'жених в полунощи'", romanized: zhenikh v polunoshchi, lit. 'the bridegroom at midnight'.) On Monday, Tuesday and Wednesday, the first three days of Passion Week, the last week before Pascha, consecrated to the commemoration of the last days of the earthly life of the Saviour, the troparion is chanted: "Behold the Bridegroom Cometh at Midnight" (Byzantine Greek: Ἰδού ὁ Νυμφίος ἔρχεται ἐν τῷ μέσῳ τῆς νυκτός, romanized: idoú ho nymphíos érchetai en tõ méso tẽs nuktós). (Note: Church Slavonic: "'Се Жених грядет в полунощи'", romanized: Se Zhenikh gryadet v polunoshchi, lit. 'Behold the Bridegroom comes at midnight'. "During Monday, Tuesday and Wednesday of Holy Week, we celebrate Bridegroom Matins. We sing: 'Behold, the Bridegroom is coming …'".)

A Passion Play, presented in Moscow (27 March 2007) and in Rome (29 March 2007), recalls the words, with which "in Holy Scriptures Christ describes Himself as a bridegroom": (Note: Matthew 9:15; 25:1–13; Mark 2:19; Luke 5:34–35, 12:35–36. "[T]he Church is presented as His wife and bride": John 2:9–10, 3:29, Ephesians 5:24–27; Revelation 21:9.)

The Bridegroom of the Church is transfixed with nails.
The Son of the Virgin is pierced with a spear.
We venerate Thy Passion, O Christ.
We venerate Thy Passion, O Christ.
We venerate Thy Passion, O Christ.
Show us also Thy glorious Resurrection.

— Hilarion Alfeyev, The Passion according to St. Matthew

== Western Christianity ==
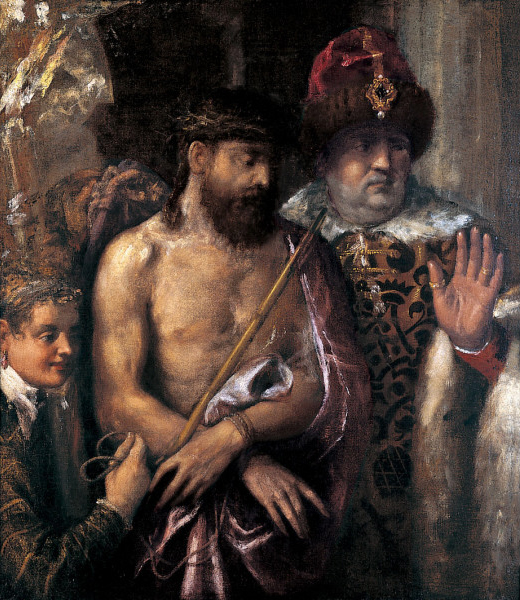
Ecce Homo by Titian, c. 1570 – c. 1576

Depictions of Western Christianity in the Middle Ages, e.g. the Egbert Codex and the Codex Aureus Epternacensis, seem to depict the ecce homo scene (and are usually interpreted as such), but more often than not only show the Crowning of thorns and the Mocking of Christ, which precede the actual ecce homo scene in the Bible. The independent image only developed around 1400, probably in Burgundy, but then rapidly became extremely popular, especially in Northern Europe.

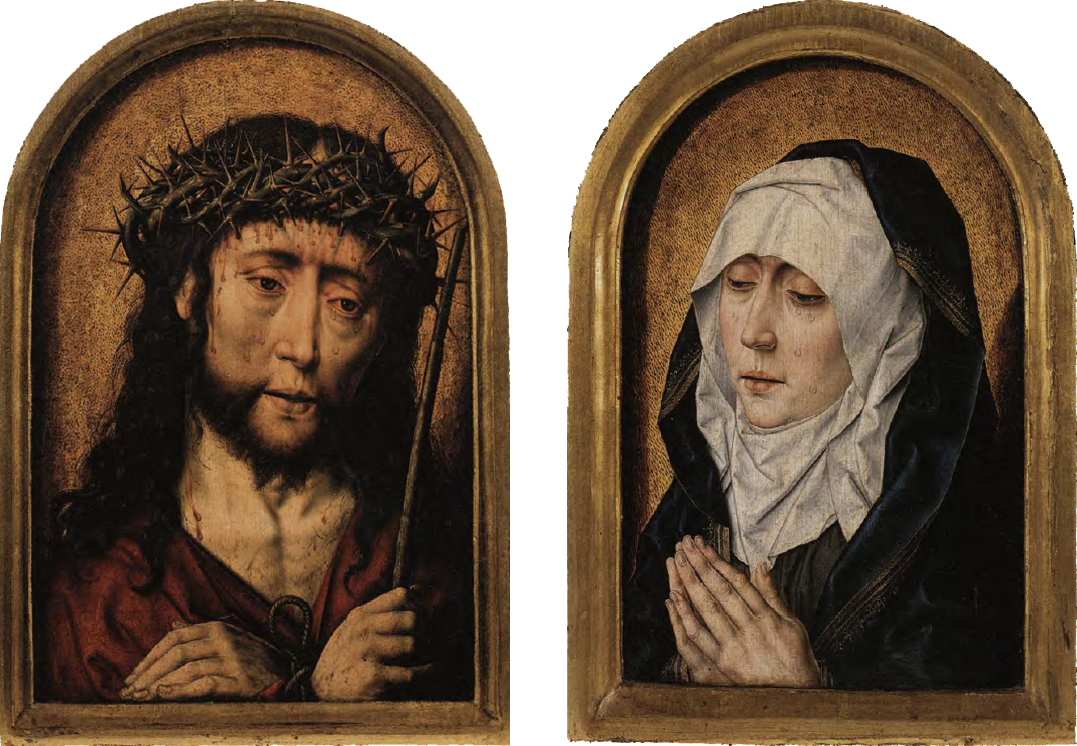
Ecce Homo and Mater Dolorosa Diptych, c. 1491–1520. Aelbrecht Bouts

The motif found increasing currency as the Passion became a central theme in Western piety in the 15th and 16th centuries. The ecce homo theme was included not only in the passion plays of medieval theatre, but also in cycles of illustrations of the story of the Passion, as in the Great Passion of Albrecht Dürer or the engravings of Martin Schongauer. The scene was (especially in France) often depicted as a sculpture or group of sculptures; even altarpieces and other paintings with the motif were produced (e.g. by Hieronymus Bosch or Hans Holbein). Like the passion plays, the visual depictions of the ecce homo scene, it has been argued, often, and increasingly, portray the people of Jerusalem in a highly critical light, bordering perhaps on antisemitic caricatures. Equally, this style of art has been read as a kind of simplistic externalisation of the inner hatred of the angry crowd towards Jesus, not necessarily implying any racial judgment.

The motif of the lone figure of a suffering Christ who seems to be staring directly at the observer, enabling him/her to personally identify with the events of the Passion, arose in the late Middle Ages. At the same time similar motifs of the Man of Sorrow and Christ at rest increased in importance. The subject was used repeatedly in later so-called old master prints (e.g. by Jacques Callot and Rembrandt), in the paintings of the Renaissance and the Baroque, as well as in Baroque sculptures.

Hieronymus Bosch painted his first Ecce Homo during the 1470s. He returned to the subject in 1490 to paint in a characteristically Netherlandish style, with deep perspective and a surreal ghostly image of praying monks in the lower left-hand corner.

In 1498, Albrecht Dürer depicted the suffering of Christ in the ecce homo of his Great Passion in unusually close relation with his self-portrait, leading to a reinterpretation of the motif as a metaphor for the suffering of the artist. James Ensor used the ecce homo motif in his ironic painting Christ and the Critics (1891), in which he portrayed himself as Christ.

Antonio Ciseri's 1871 Ecce Homo portrayal presents a semi-photographic view of a balcony seen from behind the central figures of a scourged Christ and Pilate (whose face is not visible). The crowd forms a distant mass, almost without individuality, and much of the detailed focus is on the normally secondary figures of Pilate's aides, guards, secretary and wife.

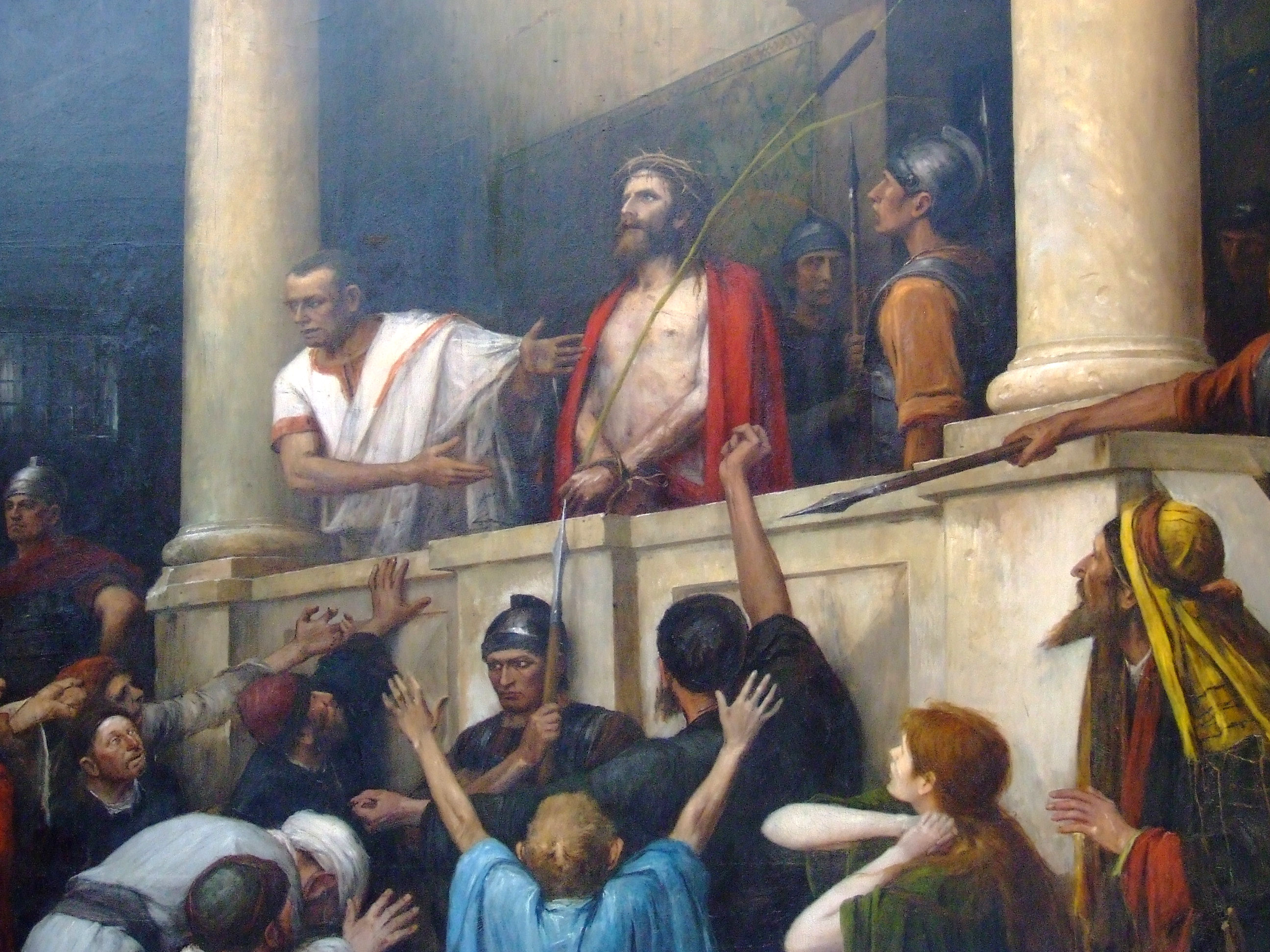
Ecce Homo by Mihály Munkácsy, 1896

One of the more famous modern versions of the ecce homo motif was that by the Polish artist Adam Chmielowski, who went on to found, as Brother Albert, the Albertine Brothers (CSAPU) and, a year later, the Albertine Sisters (CSAPI), eventually becoming proclaimed a saint on 12 November 1989 by Pope John Paul II, the author of Our God's Brother, a play about Chmielowski, written between 1944 and 1950, when the future Pontiff and later himself a saint was a young priest. Chmielowski's Ecce Homo (146 cm x 96.5 cm, unsigned, painted between 1879 and 1881), was significant in Chmielowski's life, as it is in Act 1 of Wojtyła's play. Pope John Paul II is said to have kept a copy of this painting in his apartment at the Vatican. The original can be viewed in the Ecce Homo Sanctuary of the Albertine Sisters in Kraków. It was painted at a time when the painter was going through an inner struggle, trying to decide whether to remain an artist, or to give up painting to pursue the calling to minister to the poor.

Especially in the 19th and 20th centuries, the meaning of ecce homo motif has been extended to the portrayal of suffering and the degradation of humans through violence and war. Notable 20th-century depictions are George Grosz's (1922–1923) and Lovis Corinth's Ecce Homo (1925). The 84 drawings and 16 watercolors of Grosz criticize the socio-political conditions of the Weimar Republic. Corinth shows, from the perspective of the crowd, Jesus, a soldier, and Pilate dressed as a physician. Following the Holocaust of World War II, Otto Dix portrayed himself, in Ecce Homo with self-likeness behind barbed wire (1948), as the suffering Christ in a concentration camp.

== Artworks ==
These are images of the narrative type, with other figures, rather than the devotional Man of Sorrows type.

- Ecce Homo (Bosch, 1470s), now Frankfurt
- Ecce Homo (Bosch, 1490s), follower of Bosch, now Indianapolis and Philadelphia
- Ecce homo (Mantegna), c. 1500, now Paris
- Ecce Homo (Caravaggio), c. 1605, Genoa
- Ecce Homo (Caravaggio, Madrid)
- Ecce Homo (Rubens), c. 1612 Hermitage Museum
- Ecce Homo (Luini), before 1532, Cologne
- Ecce Homo (Daumier), 1850, Essen

== Gallery ==
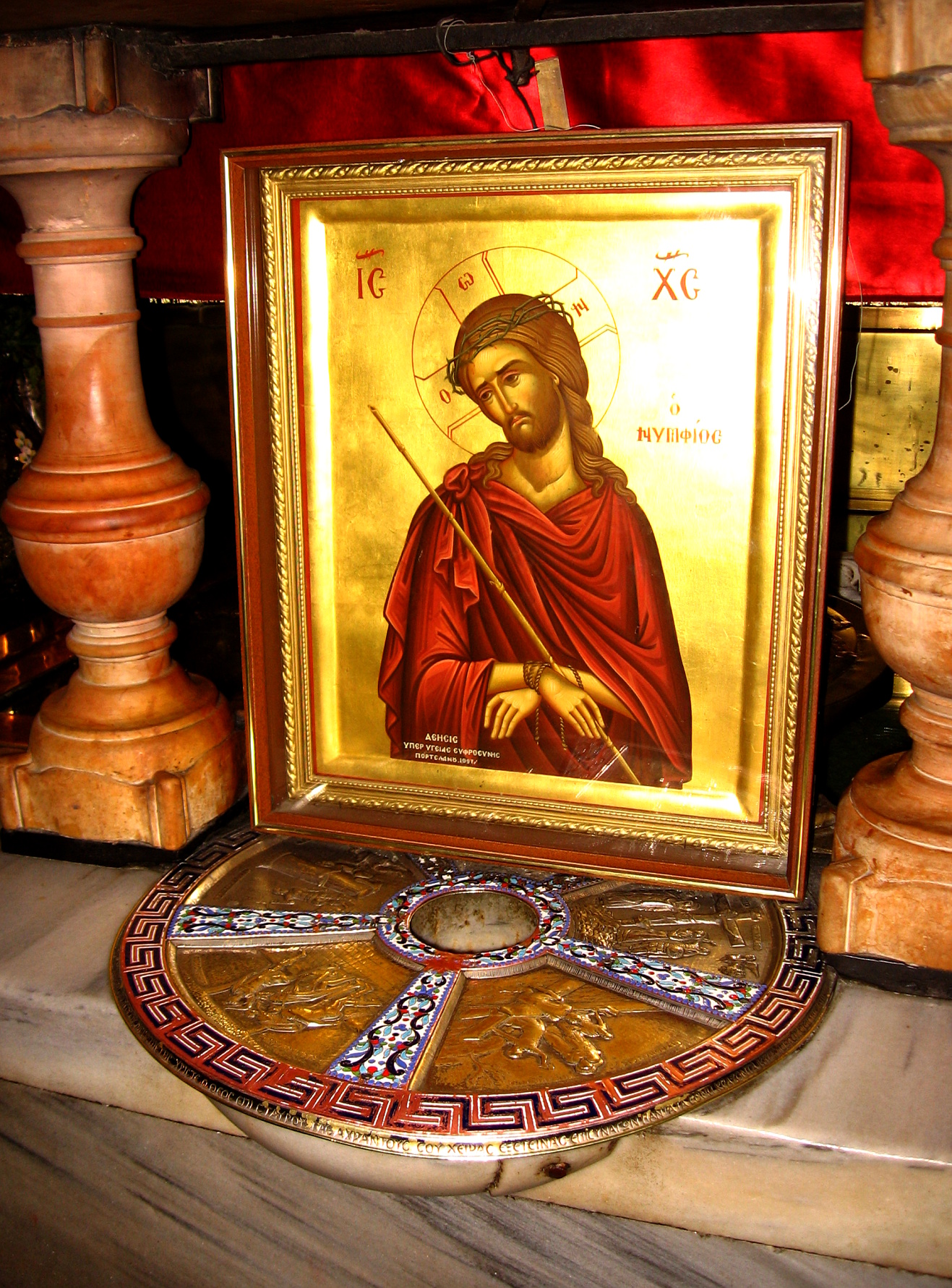
An icon inside the Church of the Holy Sepulchre (Note: Inscription: ΙϹ ΧϹ [abbr. for ΙηϲοῦϹ ΧριστόϹ] ὁ νυμφίοϲ, romanized: IesoũS CHristóS ho nymphíos, lit. 'Jesus Christ the bridegroom'. — An icon, on the apex of the Rock of Calvary inside the Church of the Holy Sepulchre, under the Greek Orthodox altar of the crucifixion (12th Station of the Via Dolorosa).)

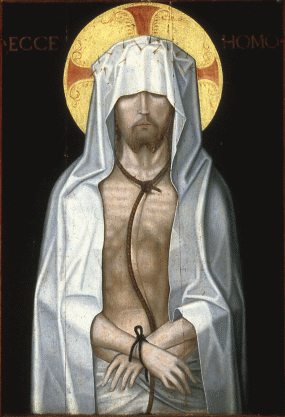
Ecce Homo, Nuno Gonçalves, 15th century

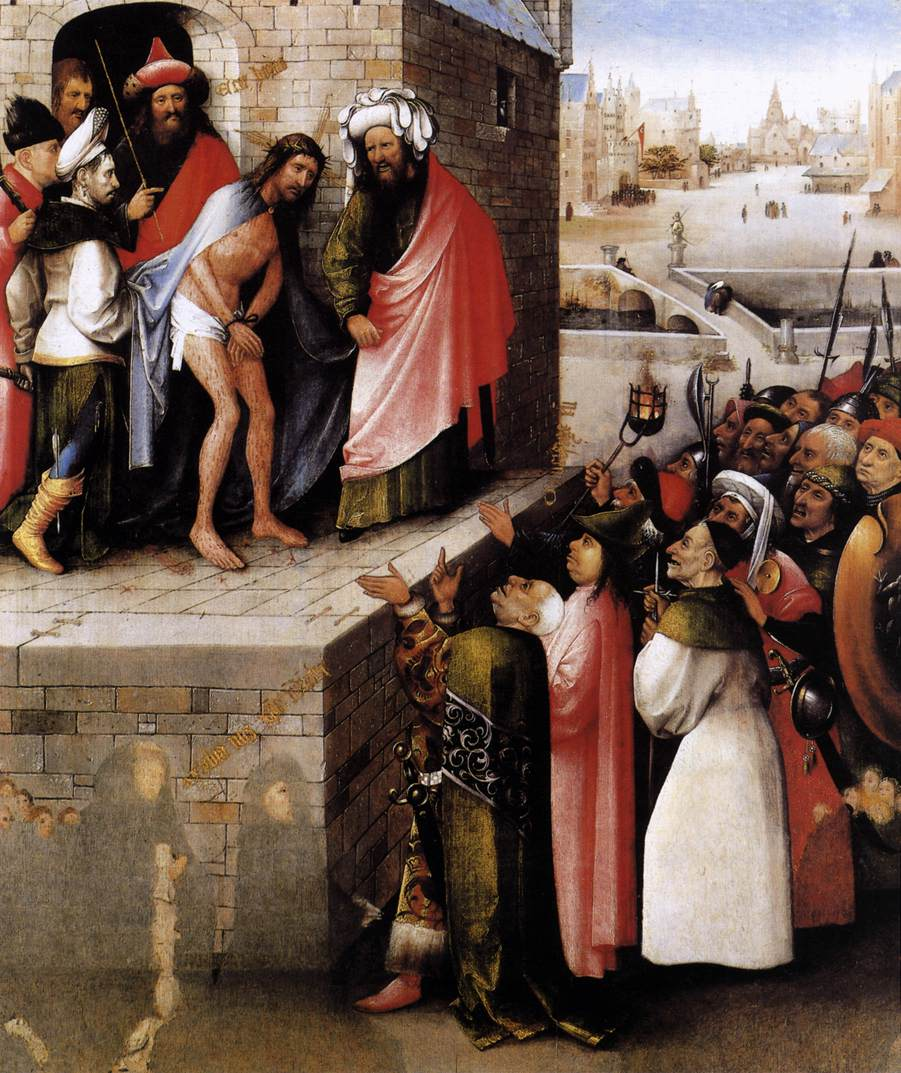
Hieronymus Bosch, 1470s

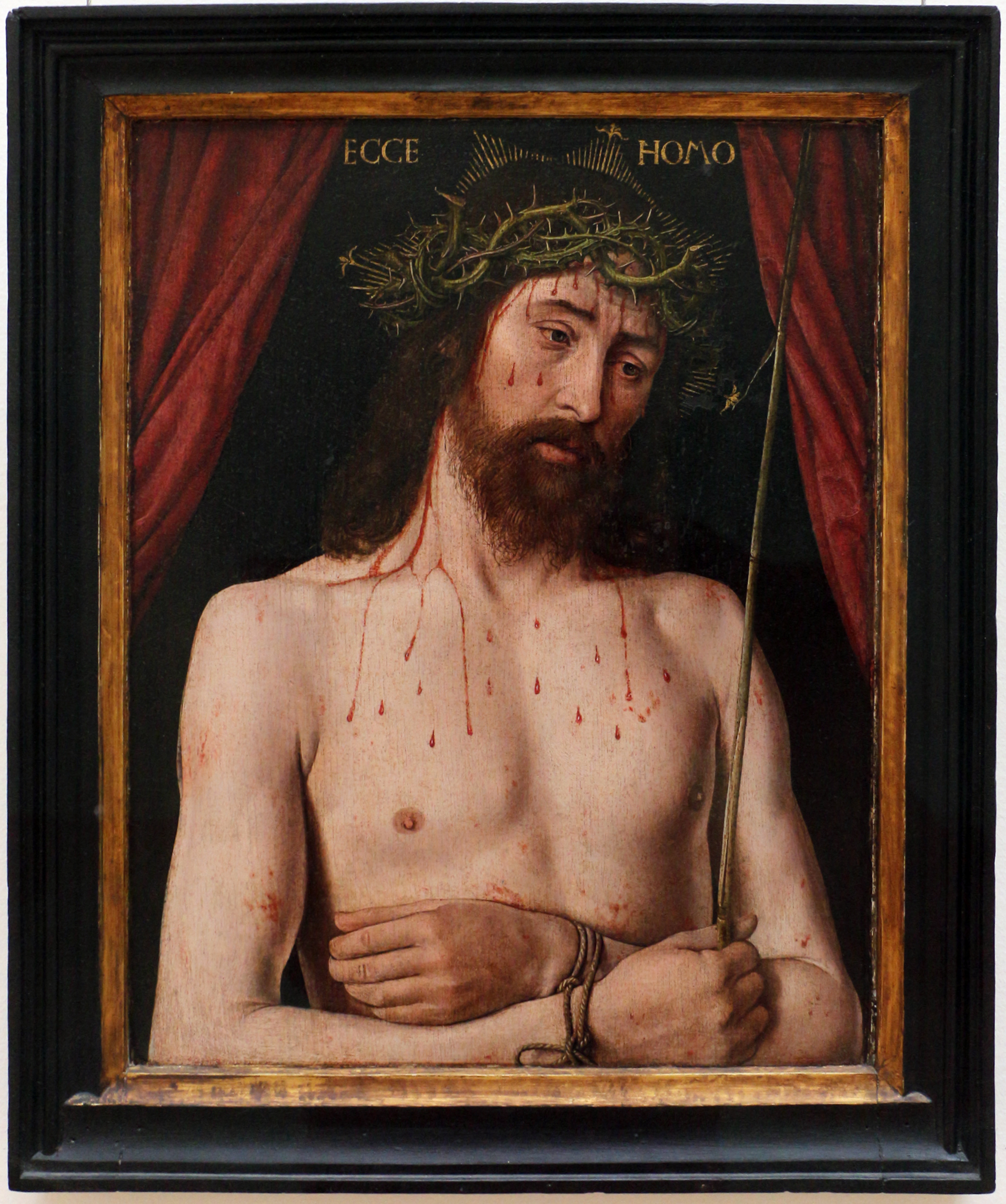
Jean Hey, 1494

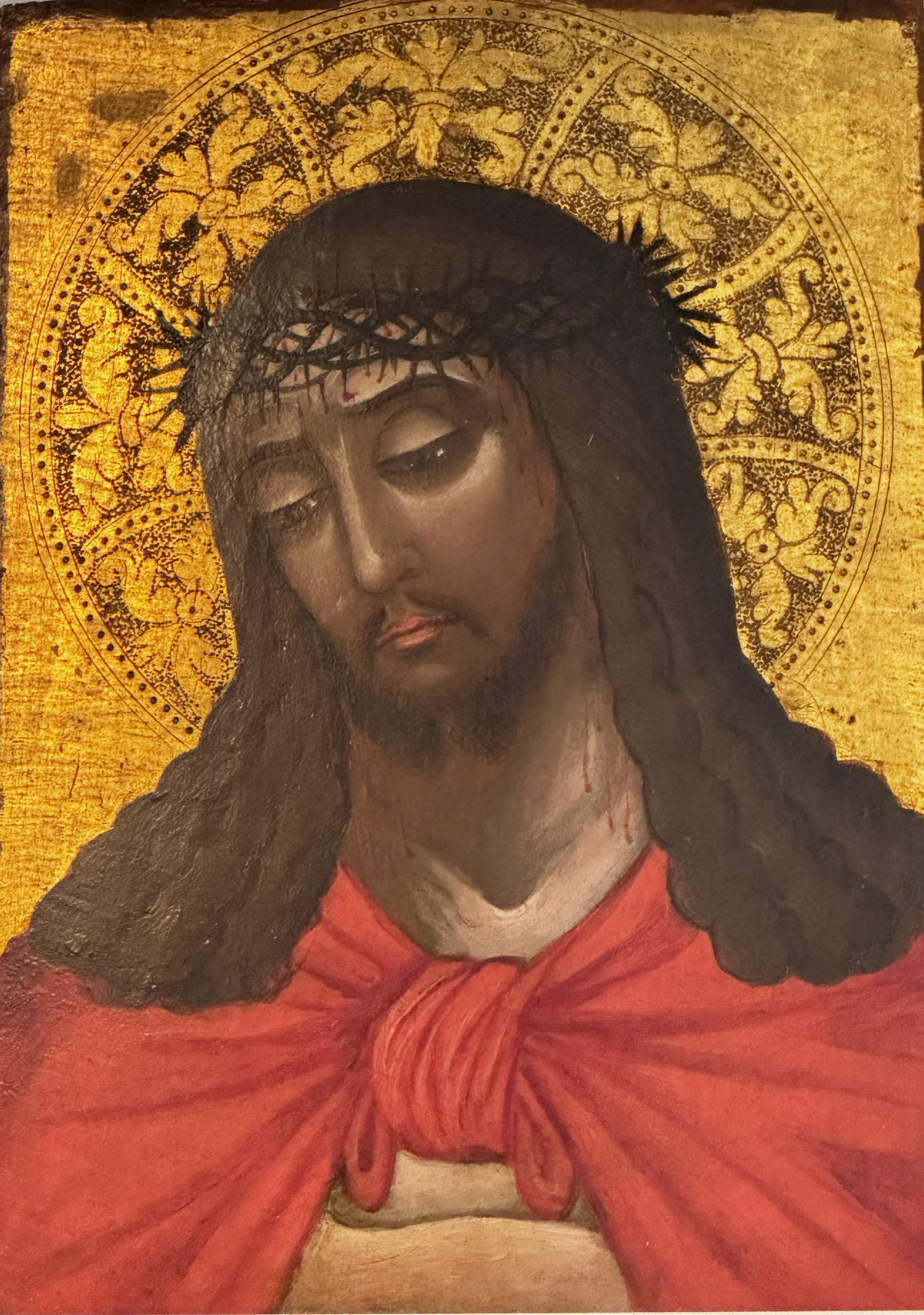
Venetian-Cretan school, c. 1520

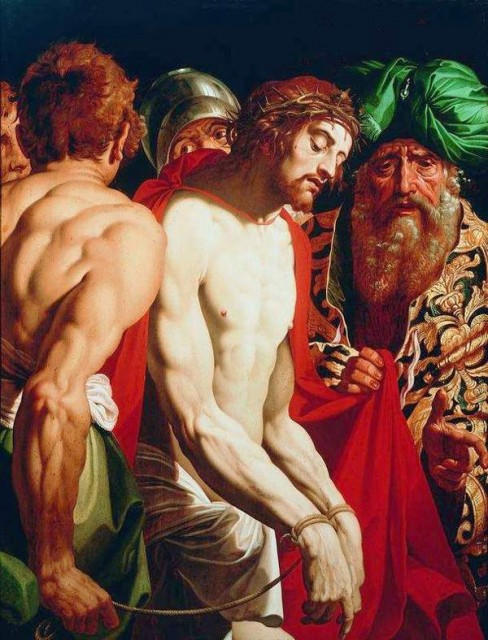
Ecce Homo, Abraham Janssens, (1567–1632)

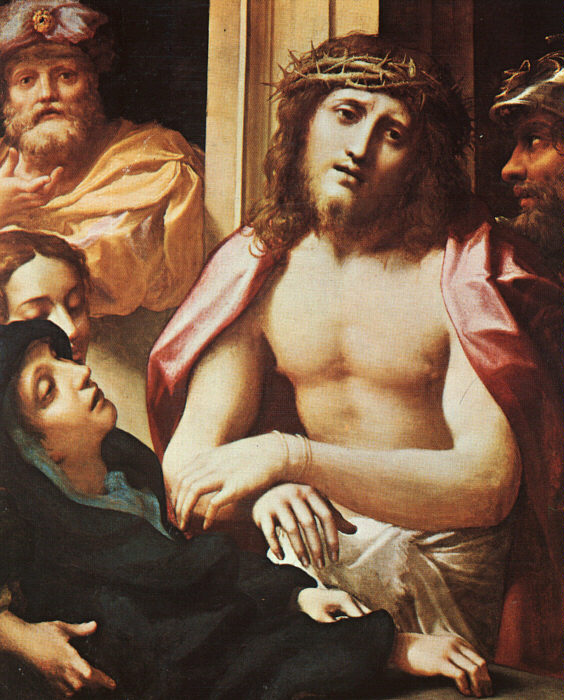
Correggio, 16th century

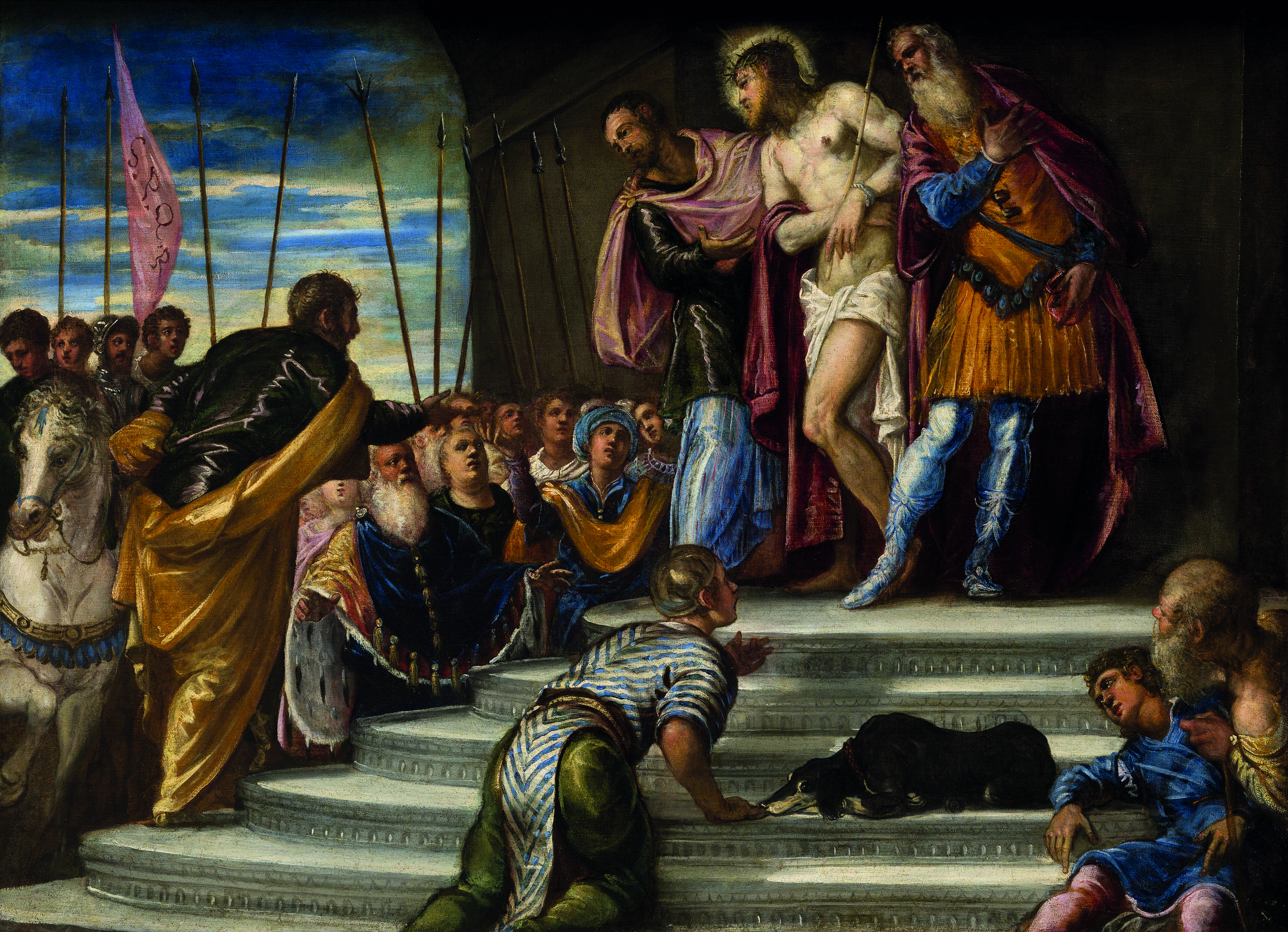
Tintoretto, 1546

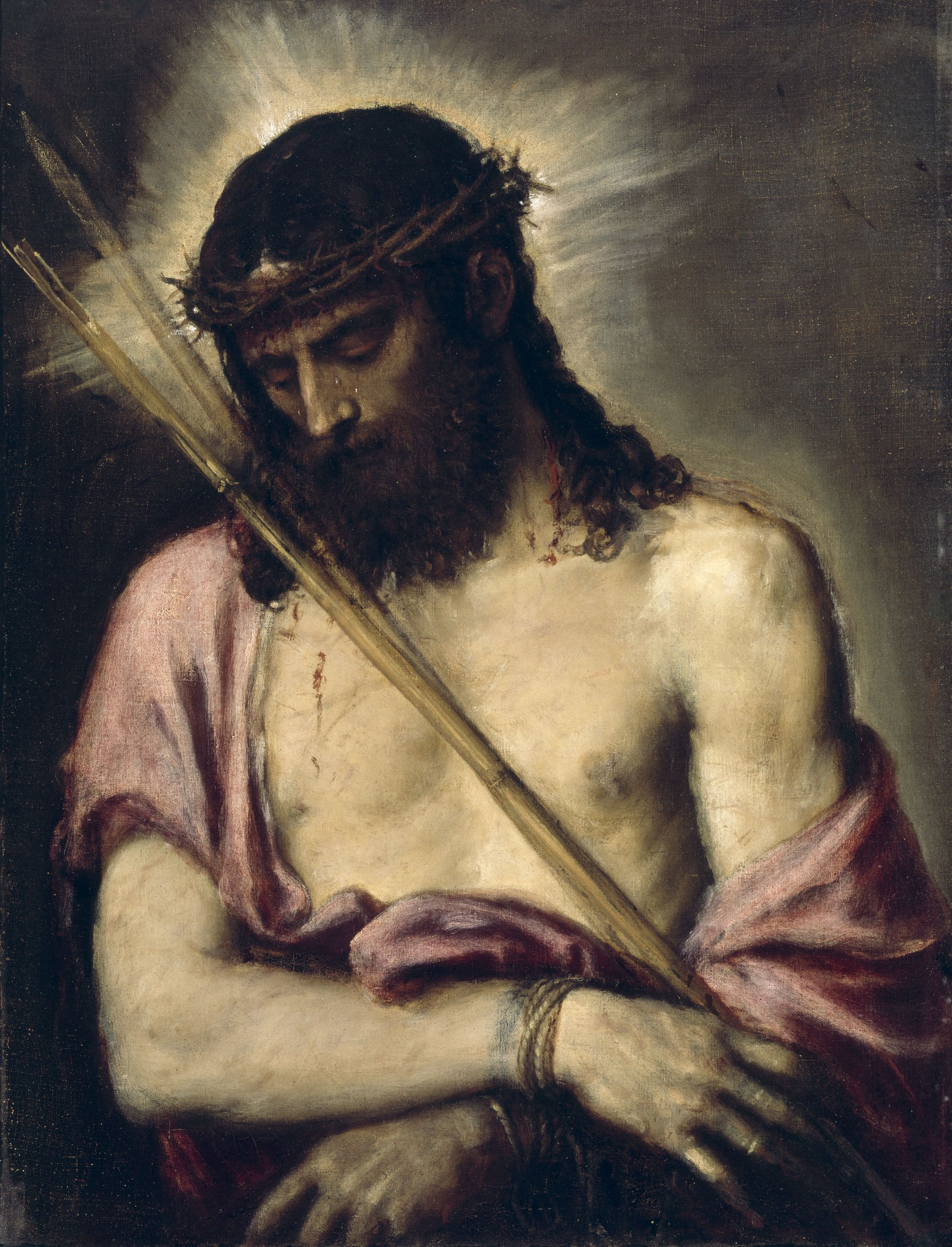
Ecce Homo, by Titian (1490–1576)

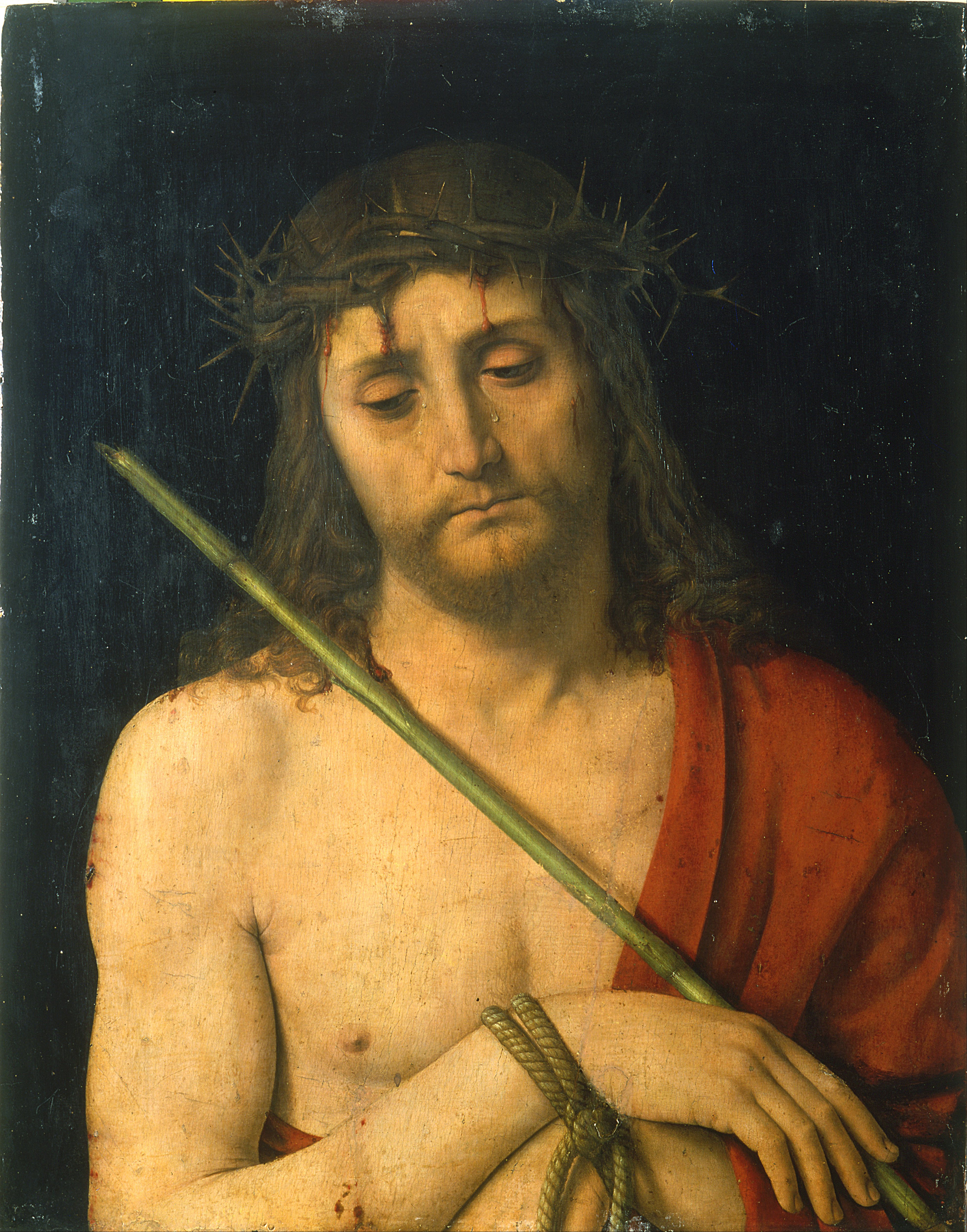
Ecce Homo by Andrea Solario, c. 1506

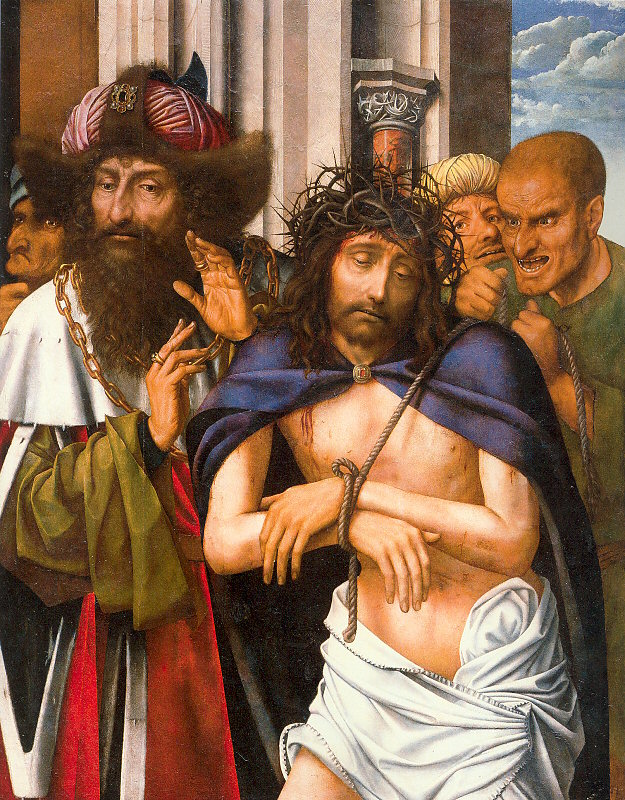
Quentin Matsys, c. 1520

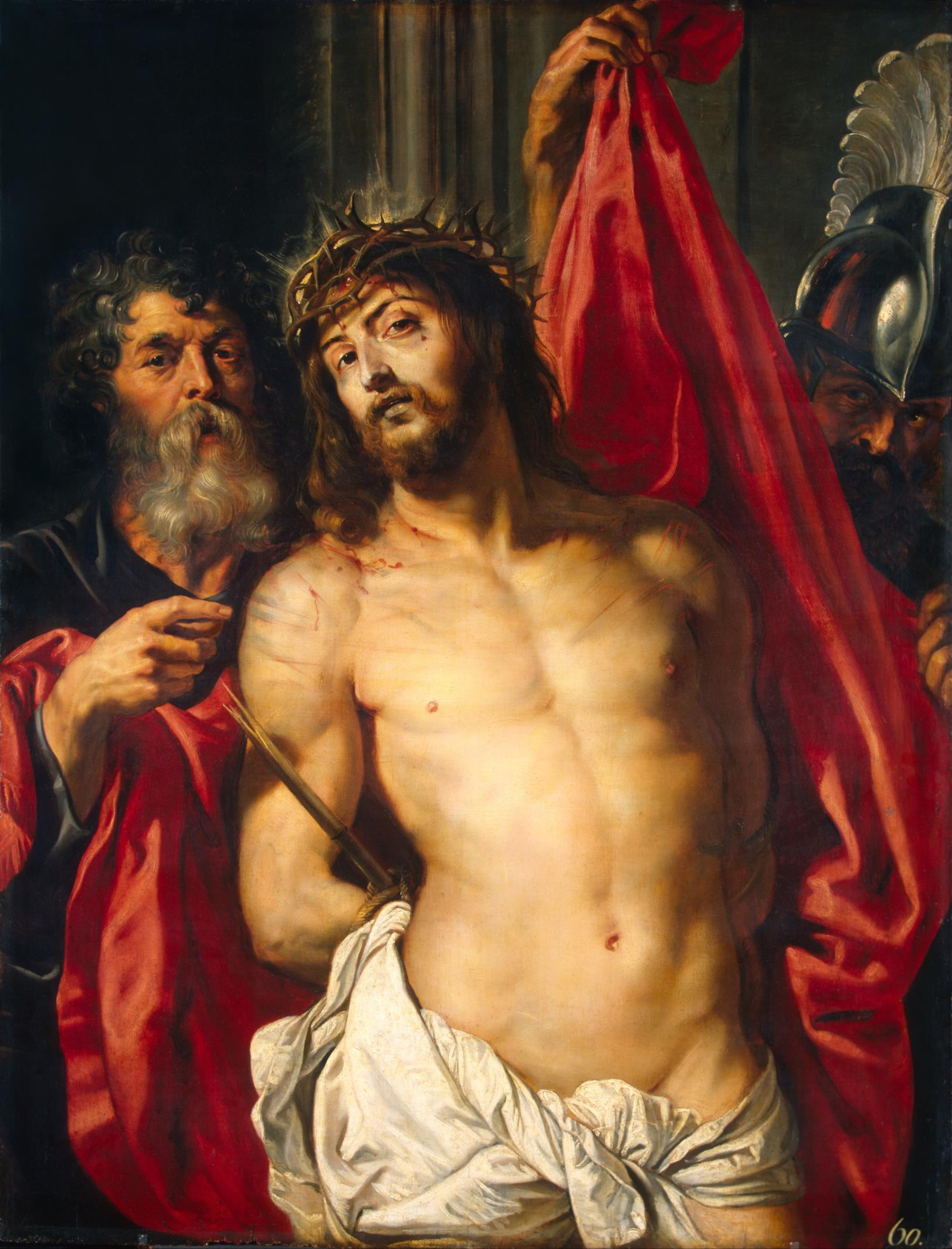
Rubens, 1612

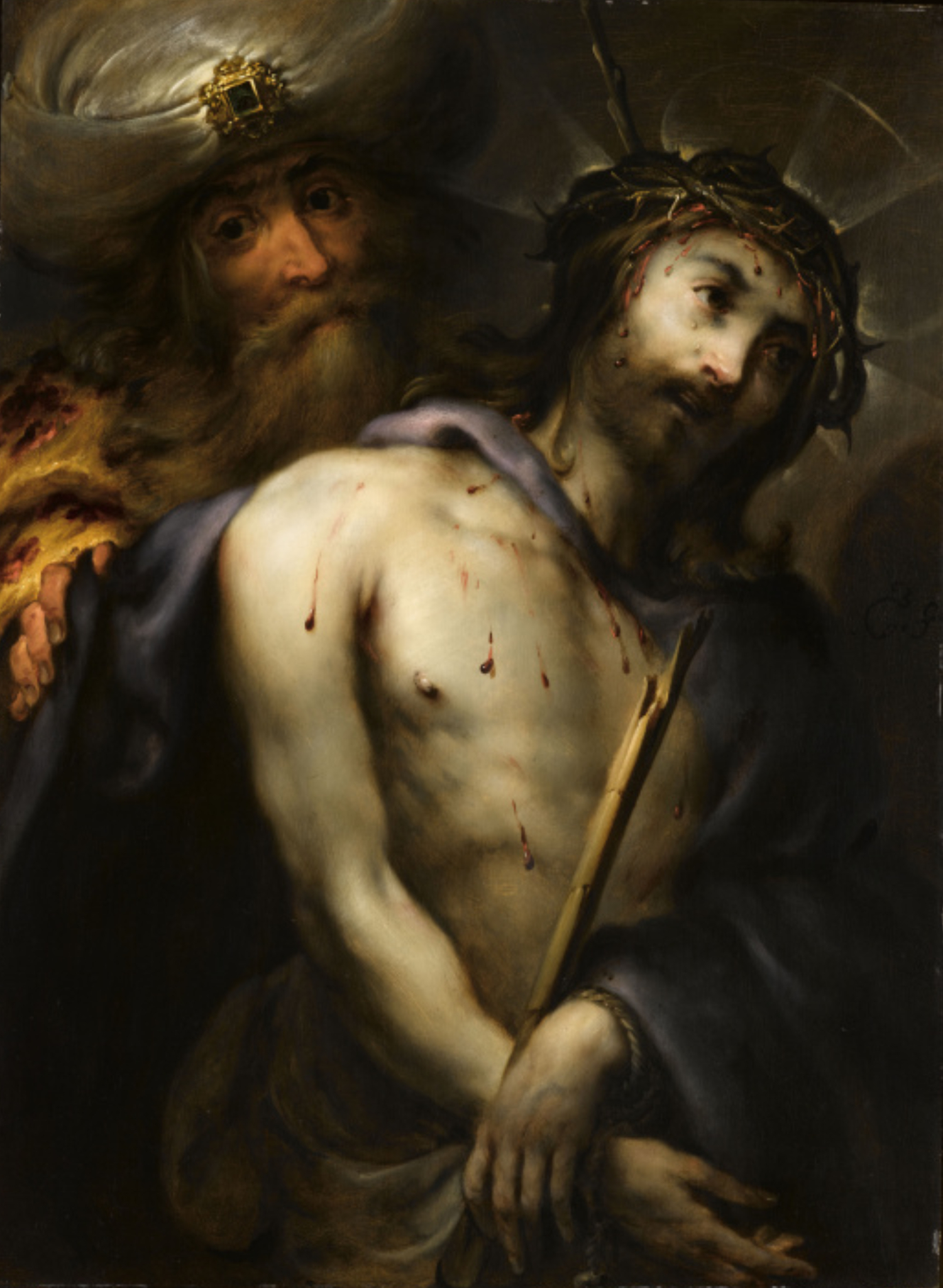
Jan Cossiers, c. 1620

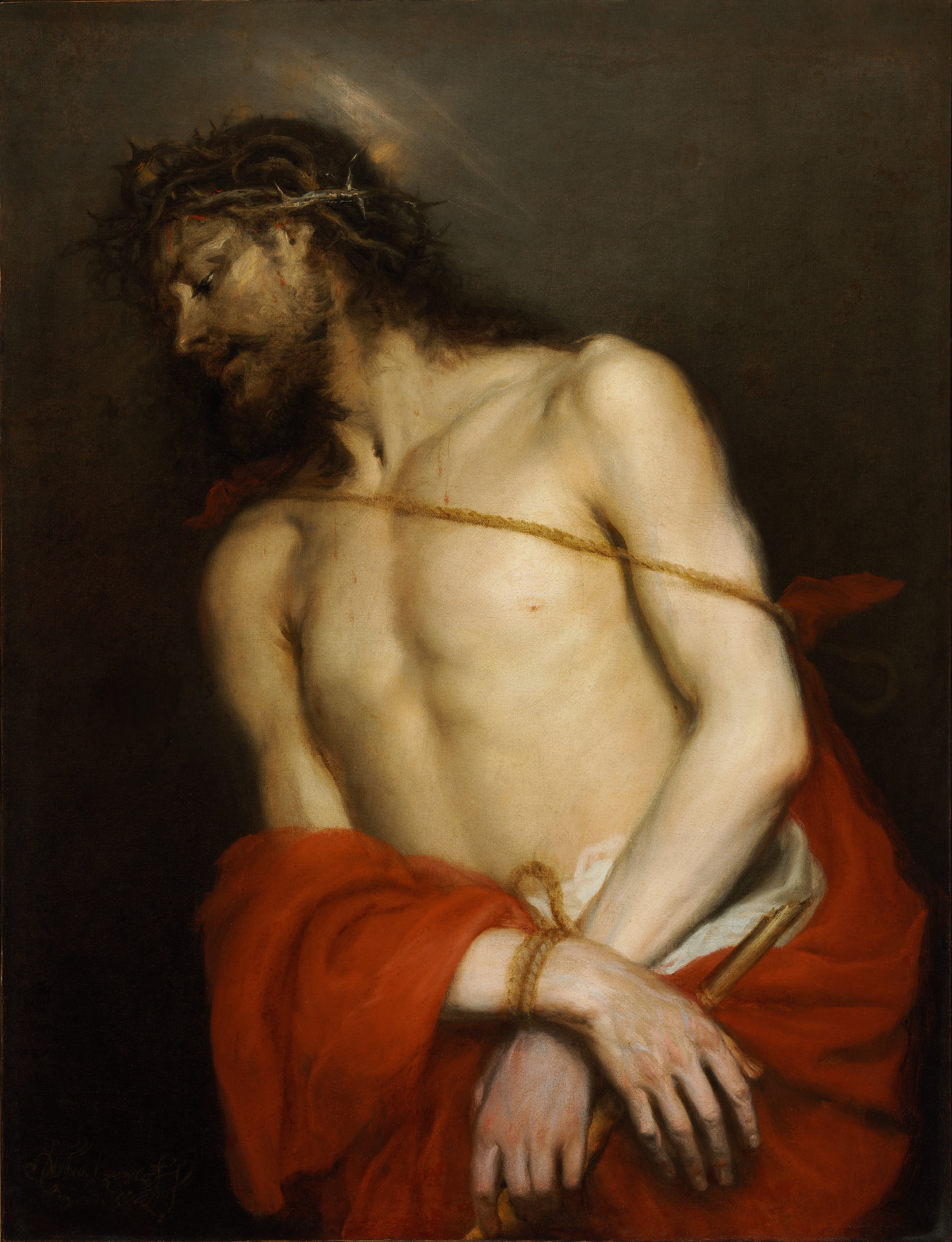
Mateo Cerezo, 1650

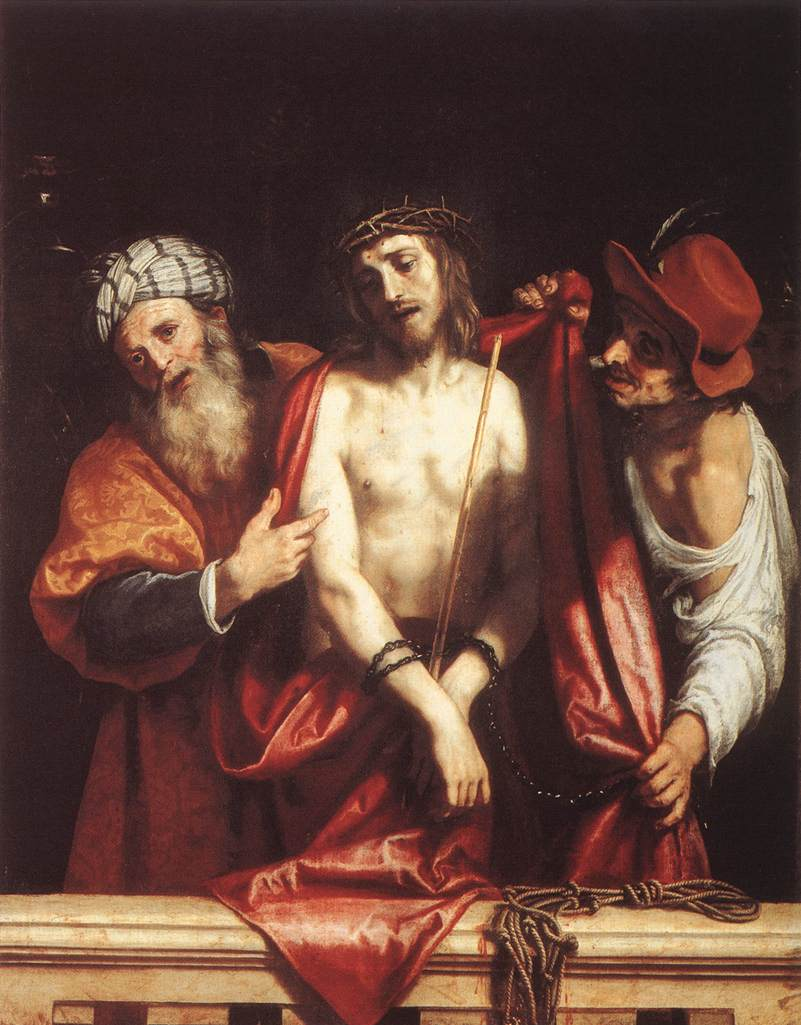
Ecce Homo, by Lodovico Cardi called Cigoli

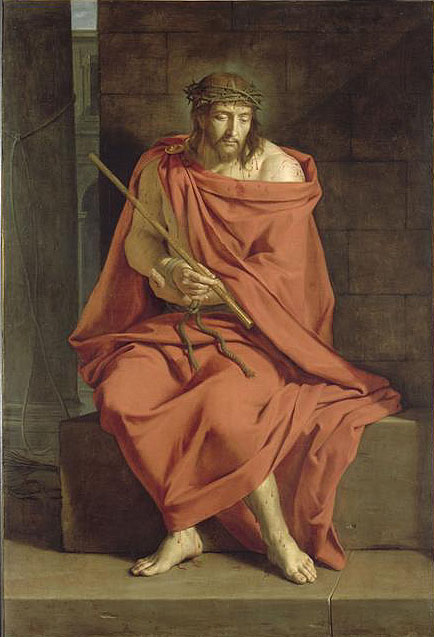
Ecce Homo, by Philippe de Champaigne (1602–1674)

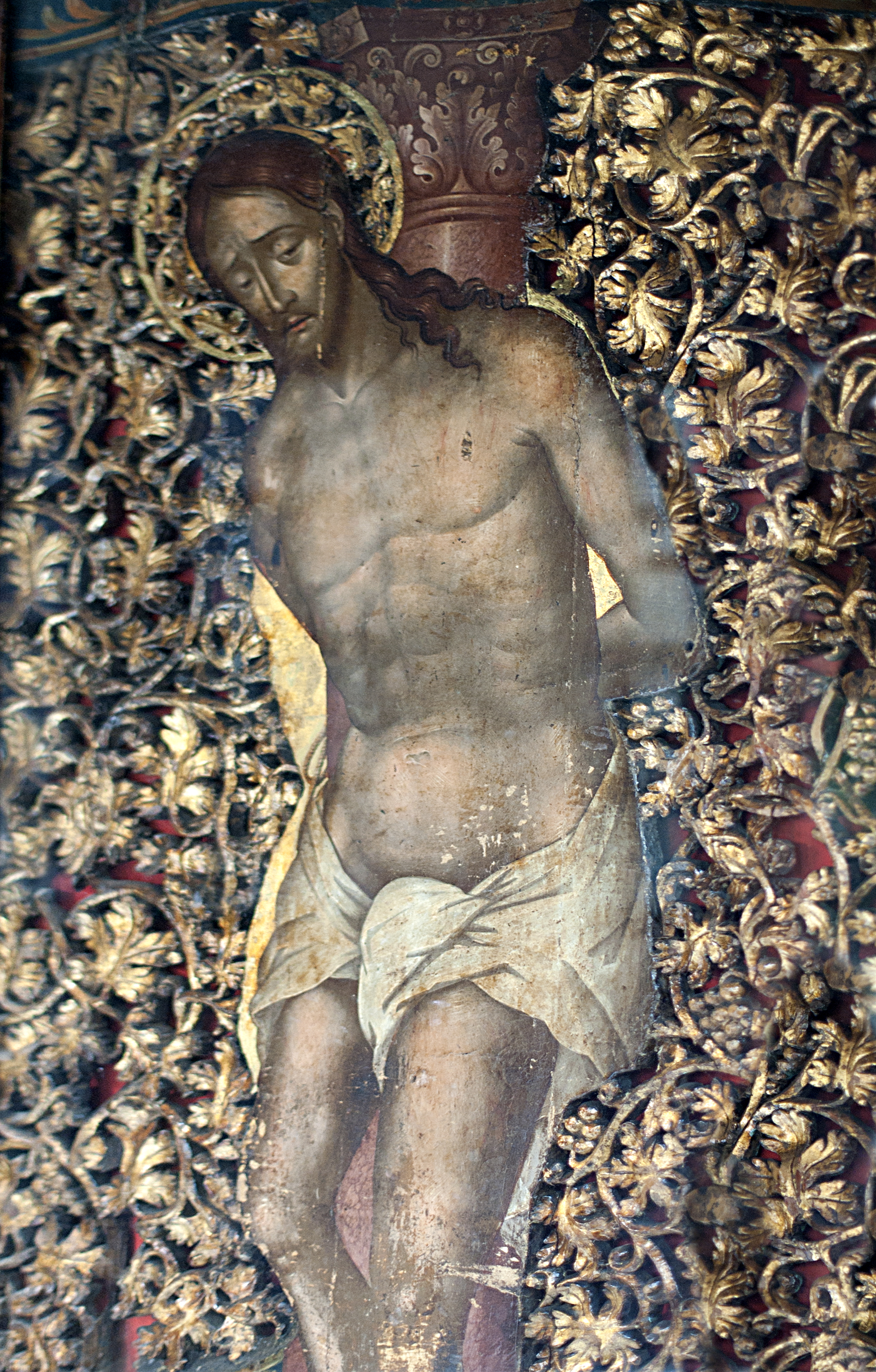
Ecce Homo, by Elias Moskos, 1648

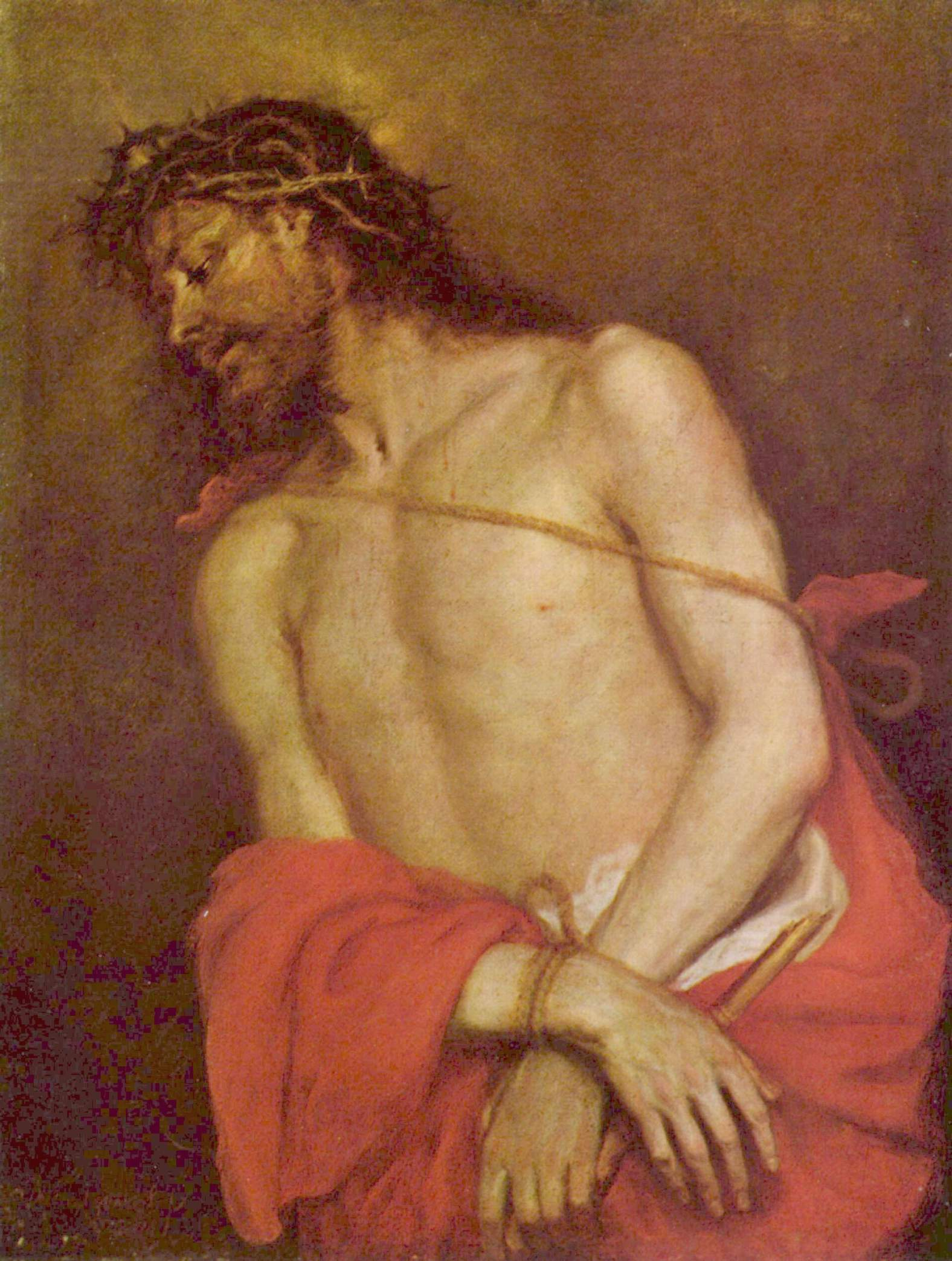
Ecce Homo, by Mateo Cerezo, 1650

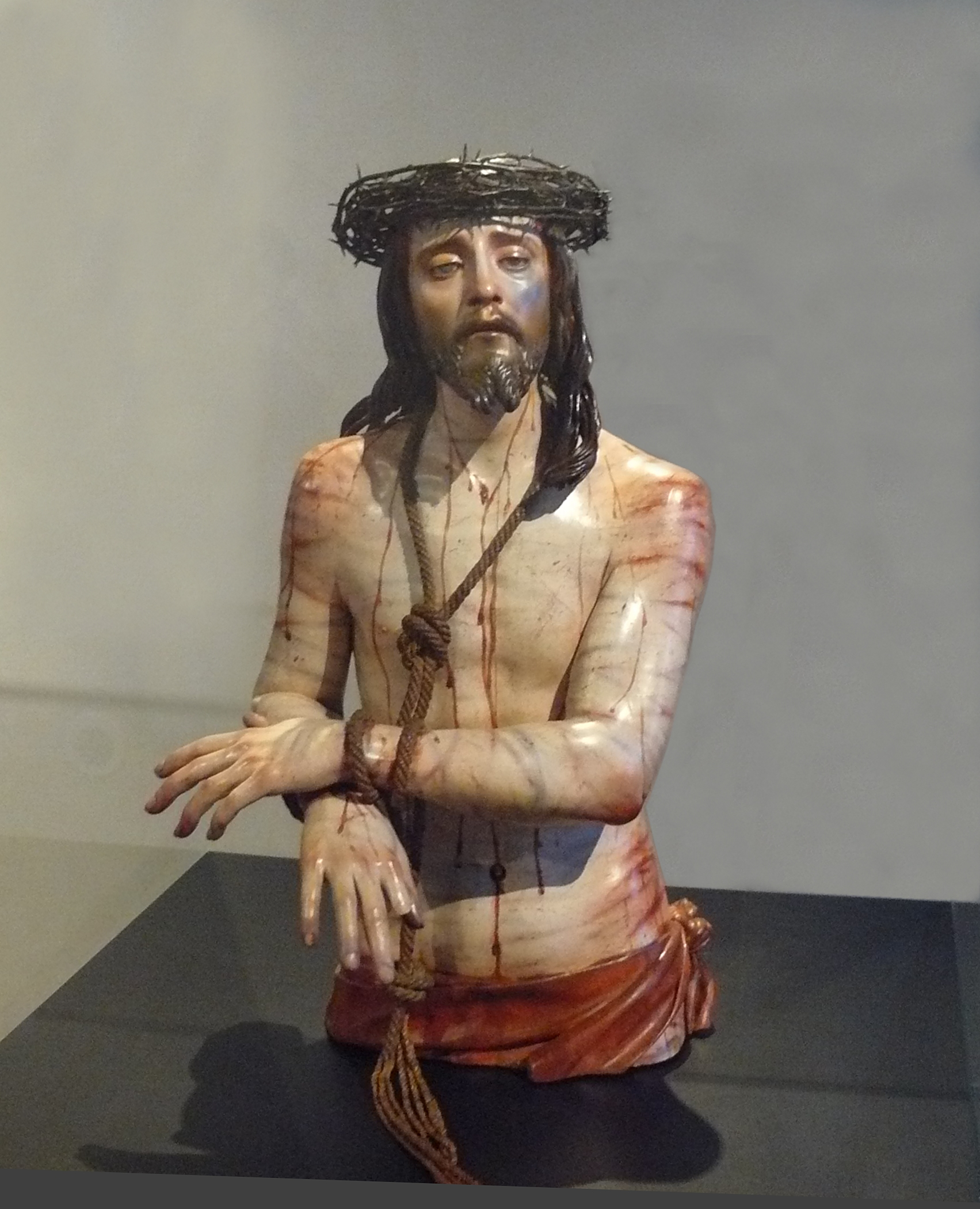
Ecce Homo, by Pedro de Mena, 17th century

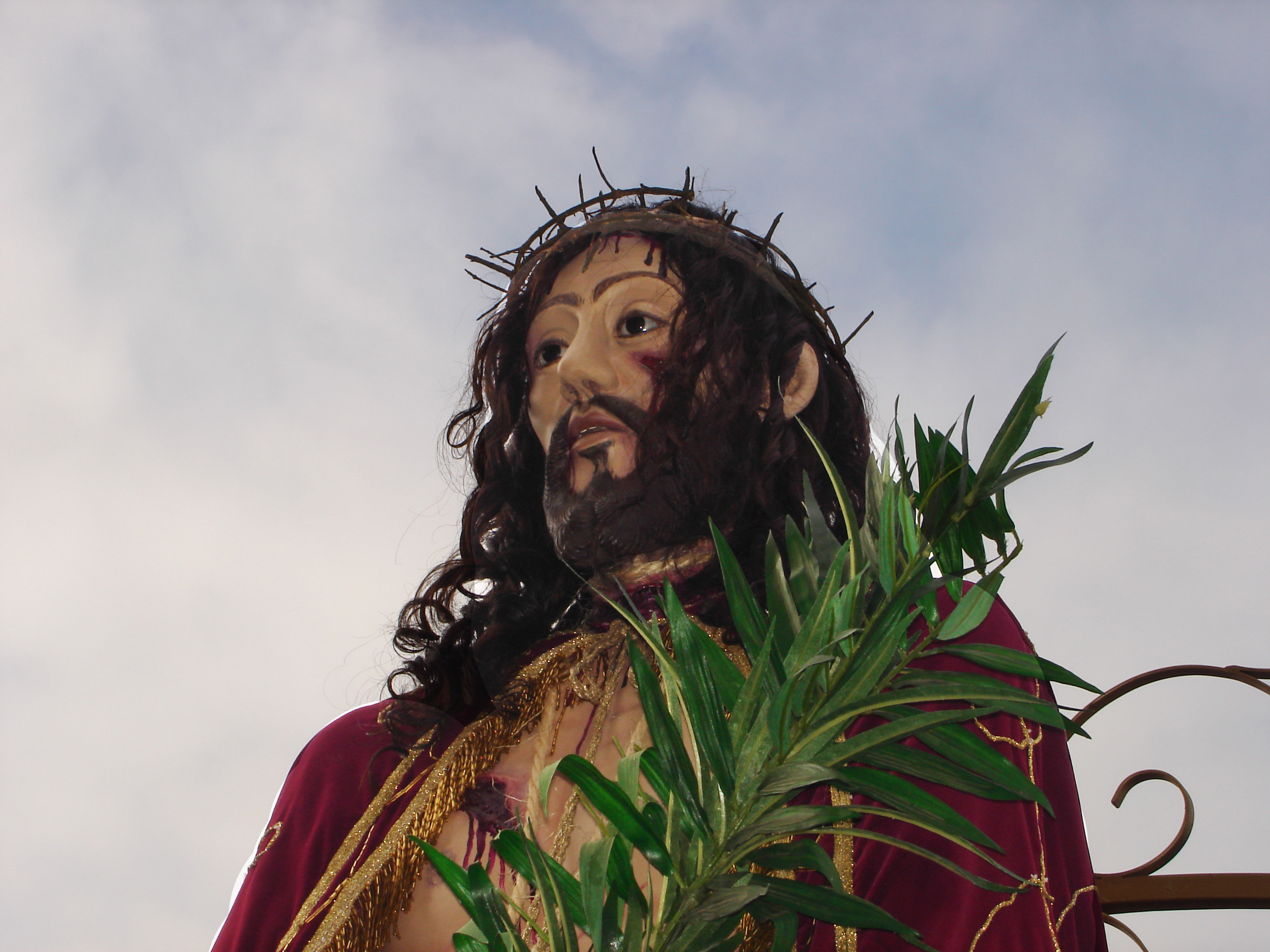
The statue of Ecce Homo, revered in Brazil as the Good Jesus

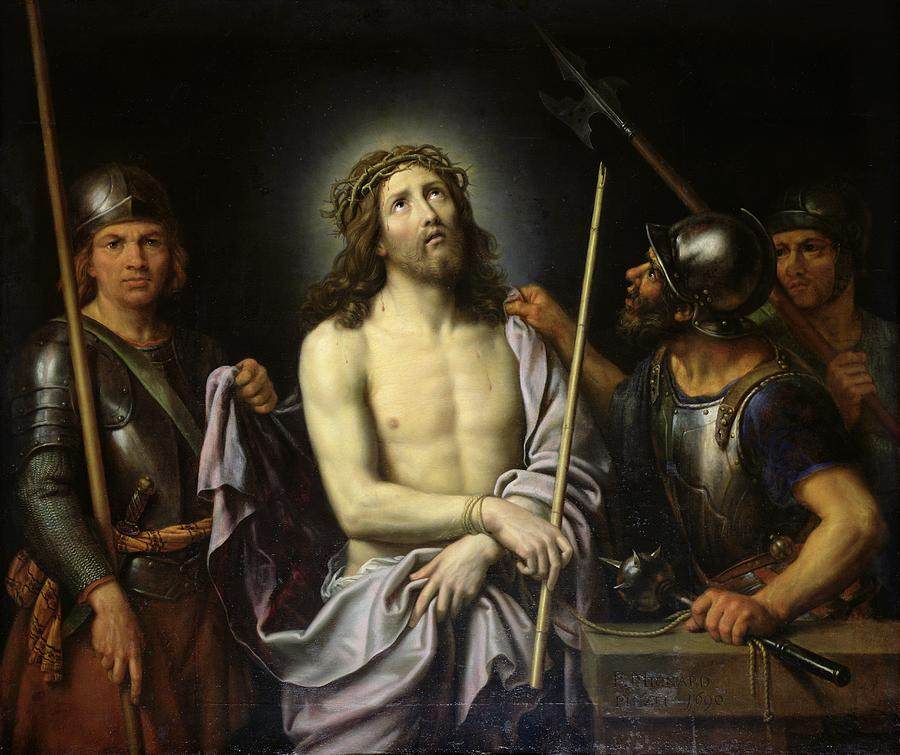
Ecce Homo, by Pierre Mignard, (1690)

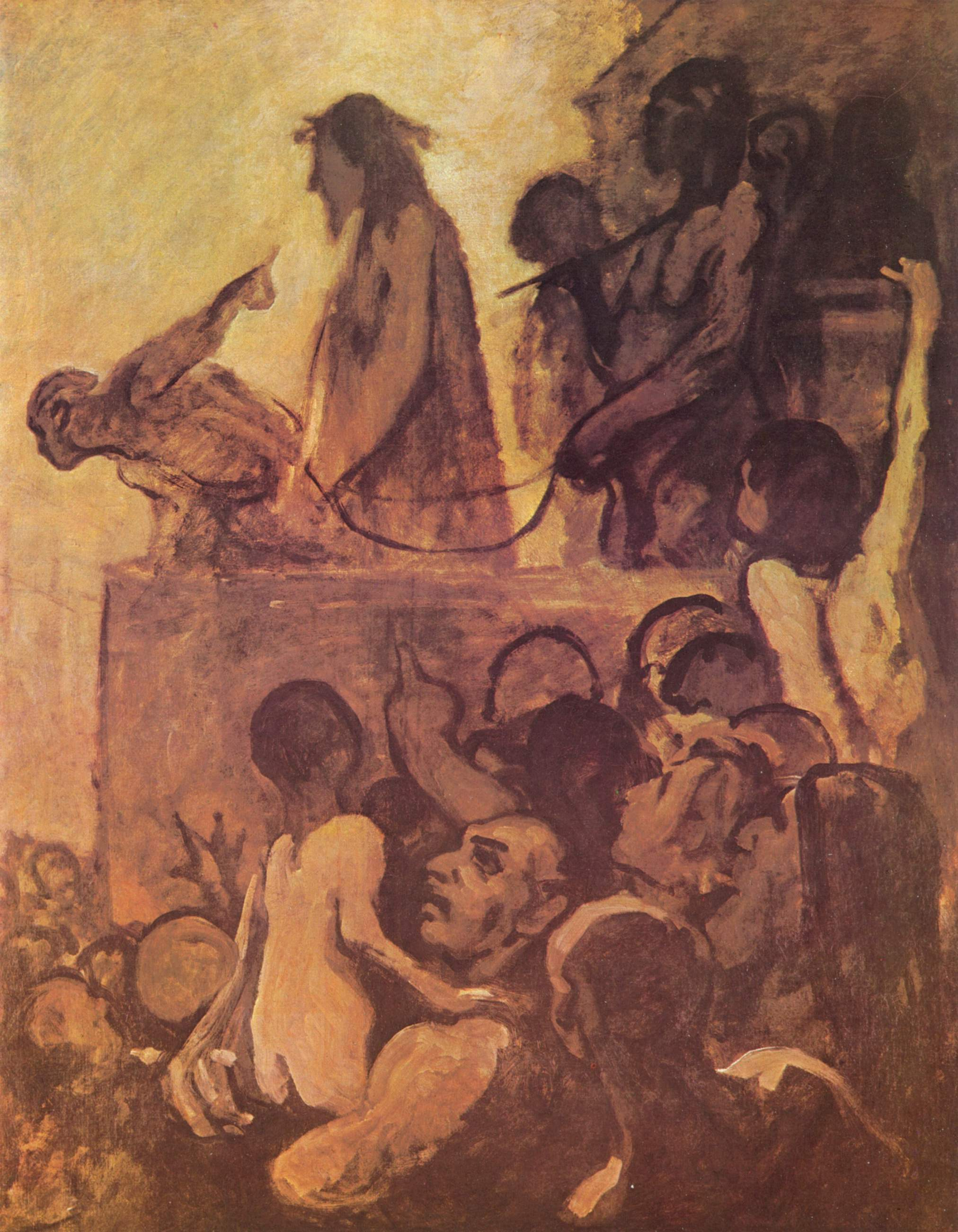
Ecce Homo, by Honoré Daumier, (1850)

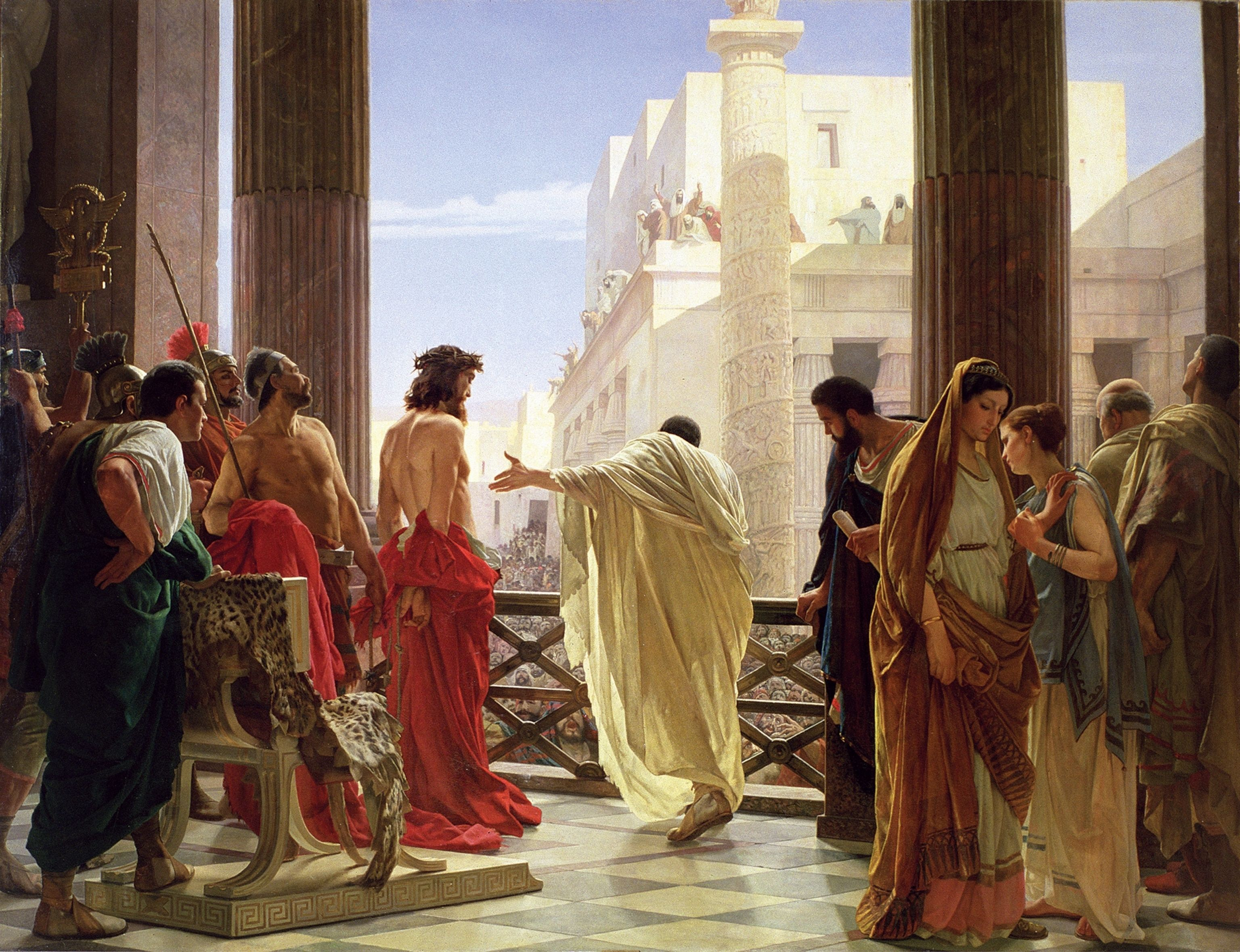
Antonio Ciseri (1871)

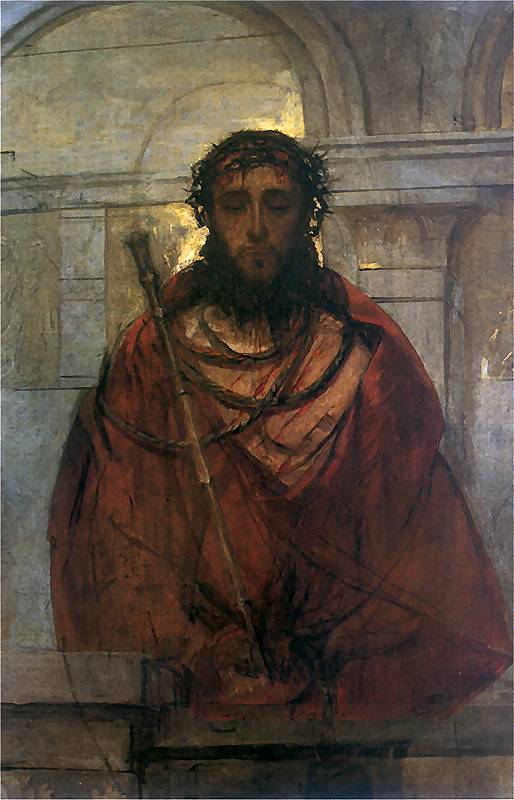
Ecce Homo, by Adam Chmielowski, 1879–1881

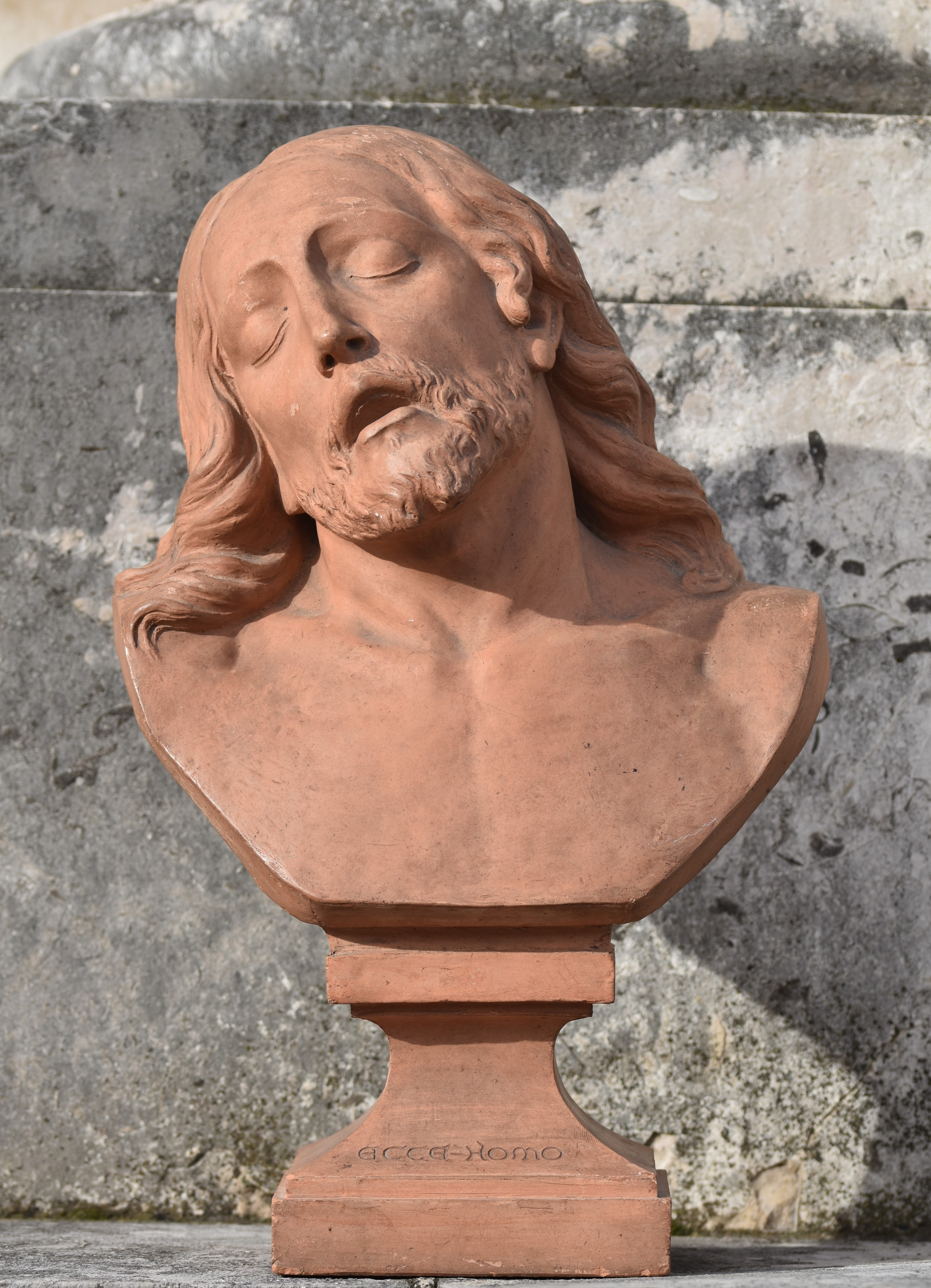
Adolphe de Mourgues (1886)

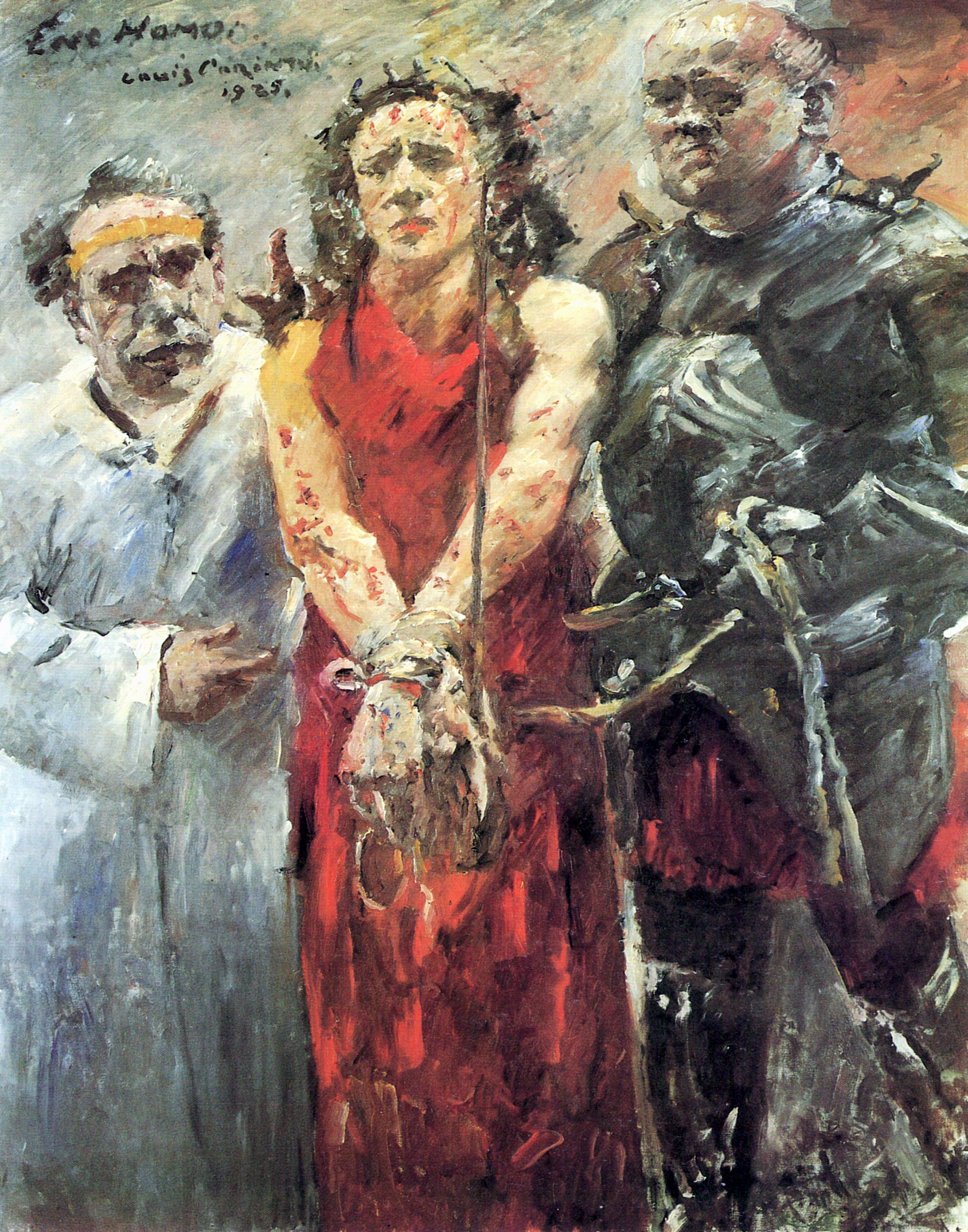
Lovis Corinth, 1925

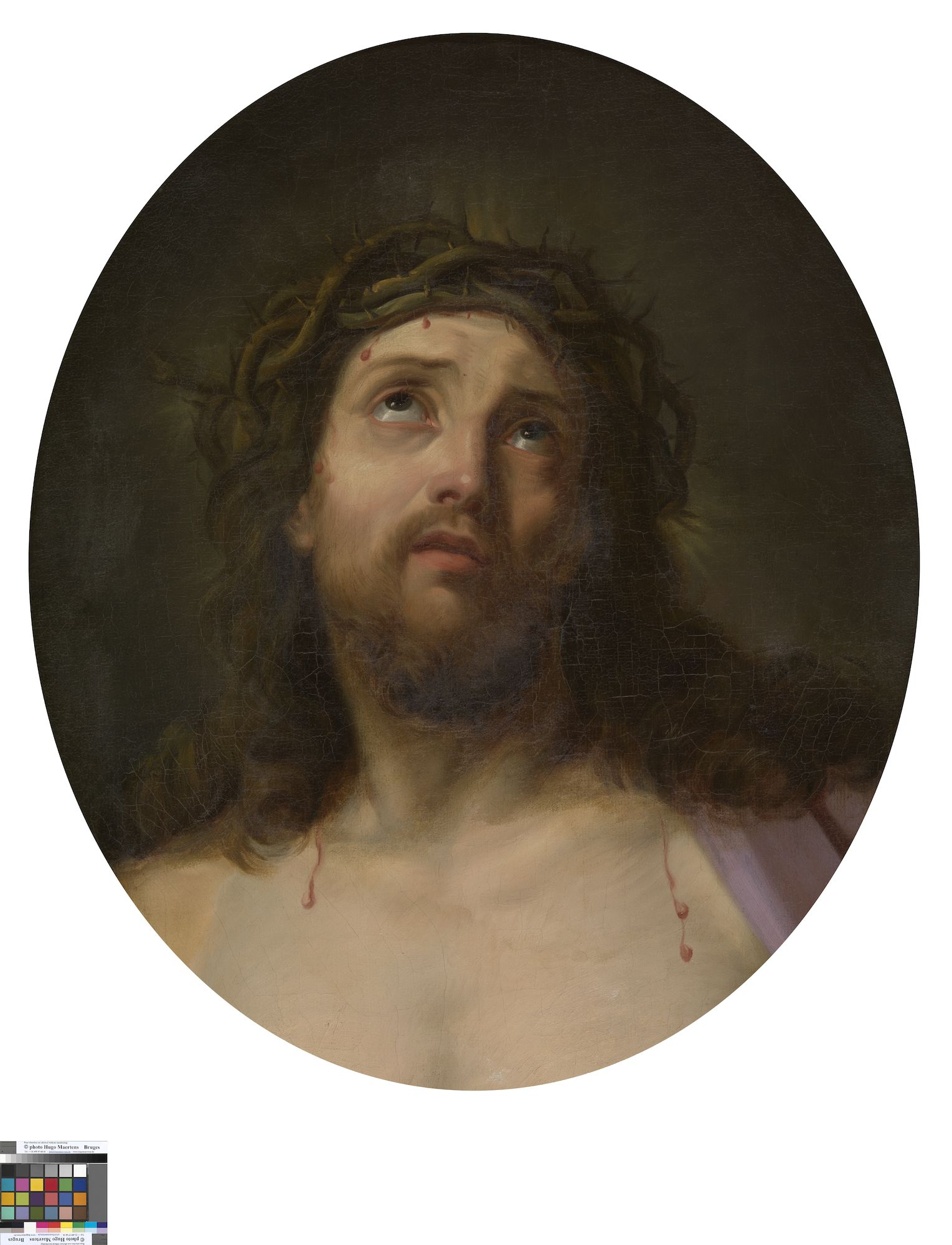
Ecce Homo by Gertrude de Pélichy

== Publications ==
- Хальфан, Елена (30 March 2009). "Se Zhenikh gryadet v polunoshchi..." Се Жених грядет в полунощи... [Behold, the Bridegroom comes at midnight...]. Pravmir.ru (in Russian). Moscow: Orthodoxy and the World. Archived from the original on 14 February 2018. — Rotem (29 December 2018). "Church of Holy Sepulchre: Greek Orthodox Calvary". BibleWalks.com. Holy Land sites review. Archived from the original on 10 February 2019.
- Dreher, Rod (2017) [2015]. "The Lesson of the Reed". How Dante Can Save Your Life: The Life-Changing Wisdom of History's Greatest Poem. New York, NY: Regan Arts. ISBN 978-1-68245-073-4.
- "Christ The Bridegroom: 'Behold, the Bridegroom is coming...'". Byzantine Catholic Eparchy of Parma: Christ the Bridegroom Monastery. April 2009. Archived from the original on 1 August 2018.
- Alfeyev, Hilarion (August 1995). "Prayer in St Isaac of Nineveh". Department for External Church Relations. Moscow Patriarchate. Archived from the original on 1 December 2008.
- John El Massih (10 April 2017). "Bridegroom, Troparion" (Sheet music) (in English and Arabic). Antiochian Orthodox Christian Archdiocese of North America — Sacred Music Library. Archived from the original on 19 April 2019.
- Basil Essey (14 February 2008). "Bridegroom, Exaposteilarion" (Sheet music). Antiochian Orthodox Christian Archdiocese of North America — Sacred Music Library. Archived from the original on 19 April 2019.
- "Christus der Bräutigam" [Christ the Bridegroom] (JPEG image). 4 April 2018. Archived from the original on 1 April 2019.
- "Christus der Bräutigam" [Christ the Bridegroom] (JPEG image). 4 April 2018b. Archived from the original on 1 April 2019.
- "Gemeinde Wien" [Parish of Vienna] (in German). Antiochenisch-Orthodoxe Metropolie von Deutschland und Mitteleuropa. 2019. Archived from the original on 1 April 2019.
- Alexandre (Semenoff-Tian-Chansky) (1984). Catéchisme orthodoxe (in French). Translated by Rovère, Irène (3rd ed.). Paris: YMCA Press. ISBN 2-85065-042-0. BnF 34859890h. ASIN B0014P88QS (1961. 1st ed.). ASIN B0014P9SHG (1966. 2nd ed.). — Александр (Семёнов-Тян-Шанский). "O dukhovnoy zhizni khristianina. Khristianskaya etika: Pritchi o Samom Spasitele" О духовной жизни христианина. Христианская этика: Притчи о Самом Спасителе [On the spiritual life of a Christian. Christian ethics: Parables about the Savior Himself]. Pravoslavnyy katekhizis Православный катехизис [Orthodox catechism] (in Russian). Archived from the original on 1 February 2017.
- Slobodskoy, Serafim Alexivich (1967). The Law of God: For Study at Home and School (English translation). Translated by Price, Susan (first ed.). Jordanville, NY: Holy Trinity Monastery. ISBN 978-0-88465-044-7. Archived from the original on 27 August 2018. — Слободской, Серафим Алексеевич (1967) [1957]. Zakon Bozhiy: Rukovodstvo dlya sem'i i shkoly Закон Божий: Руководство для семьи и школы [The Law of God: For Study at Home and School] (in Russian) (2nd ed.). Jordanville, NY: Holy Trinity Monastery (published 1966). Archived from the original on 27 August 2018. — Internet edition (Russian: Интернетское издание, romanized: Internetskoye izdaniye): 25 декабря 2005 / 7 января 2006 г., romanized: 25 dekabrya 2005 / 7 yanvarya 2006 g., lit. '25 December 2005 / 7 January 2006'.
- "Church Of All Russian Saints in Burlingame, CA". Dorogadomoj.com: The Way Home to our Father, the Lord God, and Mother Church (English translation). 19 November 2008 [31 May 2002]. Archived from the original on 6 May 2018. — "Tserkov' Vsekh Svyatykh v zemle Rossiyskoy prosiyavshikh v g. Burlingeym, shtat Kaliforniya" Церковь Всех Святых в земле Российской просиявших в г. Бурлингейм, штат Калифорния [Church Of All Russian Saints in Burlingame, CA]. Doroga domoy k nashemu Ottsu Gospodu Bogu i materi Tserkvi Дорога домой к нашему Отцу Господу Богу и матери Церкви [The Way Home to our Father, the Lord God, and Mother Church] (in Russian). 15 September 2008 [31 May 2002]. Archived from the original on 27 August 2018.
- "Behold, the Bridegroom cometh at Midnight" (Russian chant). Gloria.tv. 20 August 2010. Archived from the original on 4 April 2019.
- "Bases of the Social Concept of the Russian Orthodox Church". Department for External Church Relations. Moscow Patriarchate. 16 August 2000. Archived from the original on 24 July 2008.
- Alfeyev, Hilarion (5 March 2007). "The Passion according to St Matthew. Libretto". Department for External Church Relations. Moscow Patriarchate. Archived from the original on 27 August 2008.
- Schiller, Gertrud (1972). Iconography of Christian Art: The passion of Jesus Christ (English translation). Vol. 2. London: Lund Humphries. ISBN 0-85331-324-5. — Ikonographie der christlichen Kunst: Die Passion Jesu Christi [Iconography of Christian Art: The passion of Jesus Christ] (in German). Vol. 2 (2 ed.). Gütersloher Verlagshaus Gerd Mohn. 1983. ISBN 3-579-04136-3.
- Krén, Emil; Marx, Daniel. "Ecce Homo by BOSCH, Hieronymus". Web Gallery of Art. Archived from the original on 4 November 2016.
- Wójtowicz, Marek (3 May 2011) [29 April 2011]. "Papież nowej ewangelizacji" (in Polish). DEON.pl. Archived from the original on 10 July 2017.
- Wyczółkowski, Leon (1880). "Adam Chmielowski Brat Albert" (Artist's memory of his meeting with Adam Chmielowski in Lvov (1880)) (in Polish). Illustrated by Leon Wyczółkowski. Muzeum Okręgowe w Bydgoszczy im. Leona Wyczółkowskiego. Archived from the original on 12 March 2016.
- Grosz, George (2011) [1922–1923, reproduced drawings and watercolors executed 1915–1922]. Ecce Homo. rororo 25684 (reprint ed.). Hamburg: Rowohlt Verlag. ISBN 978-3-499-25684-4.
- Wicks, Robert J. (8 May 2017). "Nietzsche's Life and Works". In Zalta, Edward N. (ed.). Stanford Encyclopedia of Philosophy. ISSN 1095-5054. OCLC 429049174.

== See also ==
- Ecce Homo: How One Becomes What One Is (Note: "[F]inal autobiographical statement" by Friedrich Nietzsche. "He begins this fateful intellectual autobiography—he was to lose his mind little more than a month later—with three eyebrow-raising sections entitled, 'Why I Am So Wise', 'Why I Am So Clever', and 'Why I Write Such Good Books'.")
- Ecce homo qui est faba (Note: Ecce homo qui est faba (Latin for 'Behold the man who is a bean'). Choral theme tune of the TV sitcom Mr. Bean.)
- Ecce Mono (Note: Macaronic Latin / Ecce Mono (Spanish for 'Behold the monkey'). Exemplary of an accidental damage of art.)
