= Ecce Homo (Rubens) =

Painting by Peter Paul Rubens

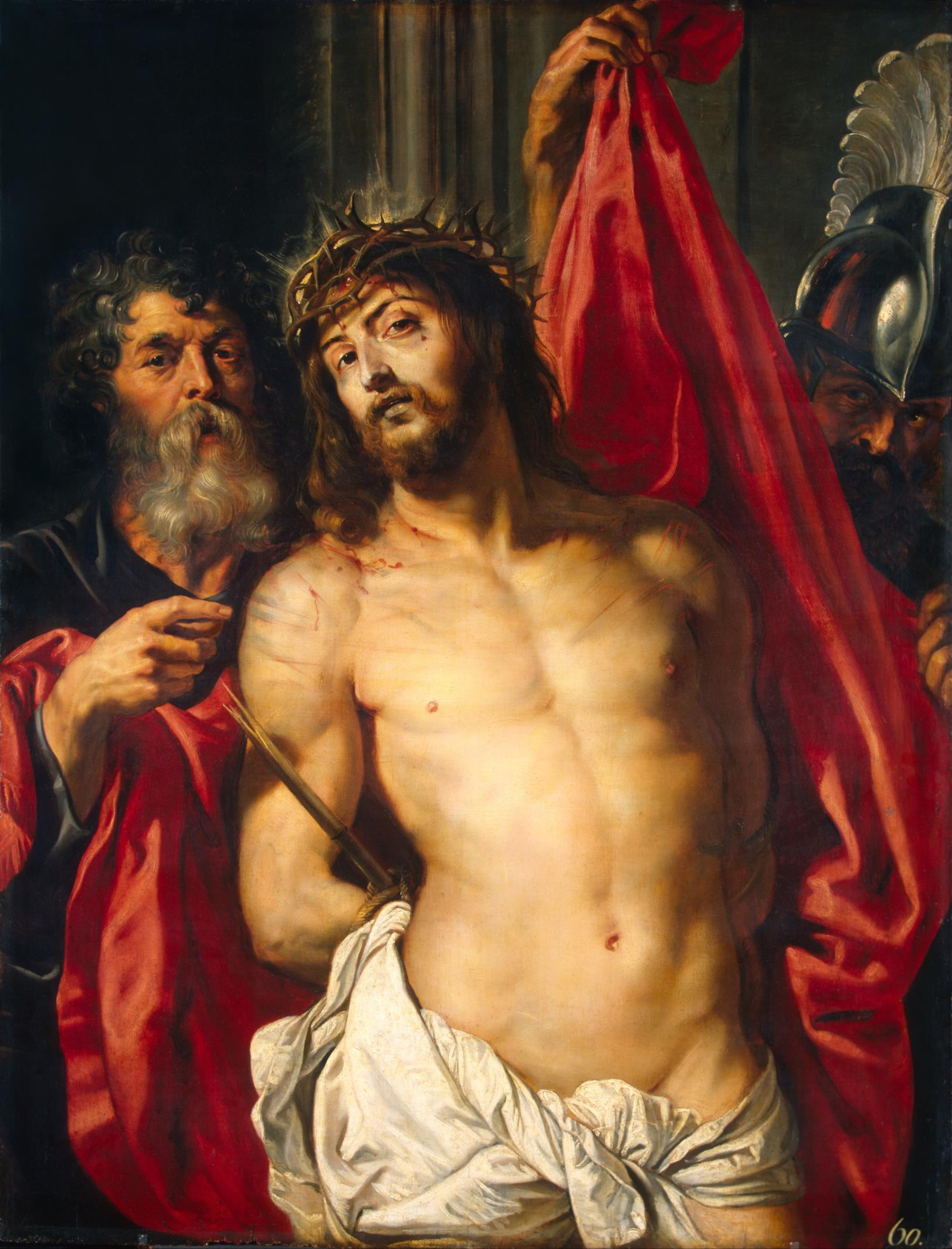
Ecce Homo (c. 1612) by Rubens

Ecce Homo or Christ Wearing the Crown of Thorns is an oil on oak panel painting of the Ecce Homo subject by Peter Paul Rubens, executed c. 1612, now in the Hermitage Museum, in Saint Petersburg. The Hermitage also houses an oil study for its figure of Pilate.

Originally commissioned by cardinal Massimego, Christ's pose was influenced by the statue of a centaur in the Borghese Gallery in Rome and the work may even have been produced as a pendant to the 1616-1617 Drunken Silenus (Alte Pinakothek). H. Evers argues it was produced during the artist's stay in Genoa, whilst Keizer argues it was from Rubens' later period in Antwerp. By the end of the 18th century it was in Prince Bezborodko's collection in Saint Petersburg. It passed by inheritance to his relatives-in-law, the Counts Kushelev; on his death in 1862, Count Nikolai Kushelev-Bezborodko bequested the collection to the Academy of Arts.
