= Ecce Homo (Daumier) =

Painting by Honoré Daumier

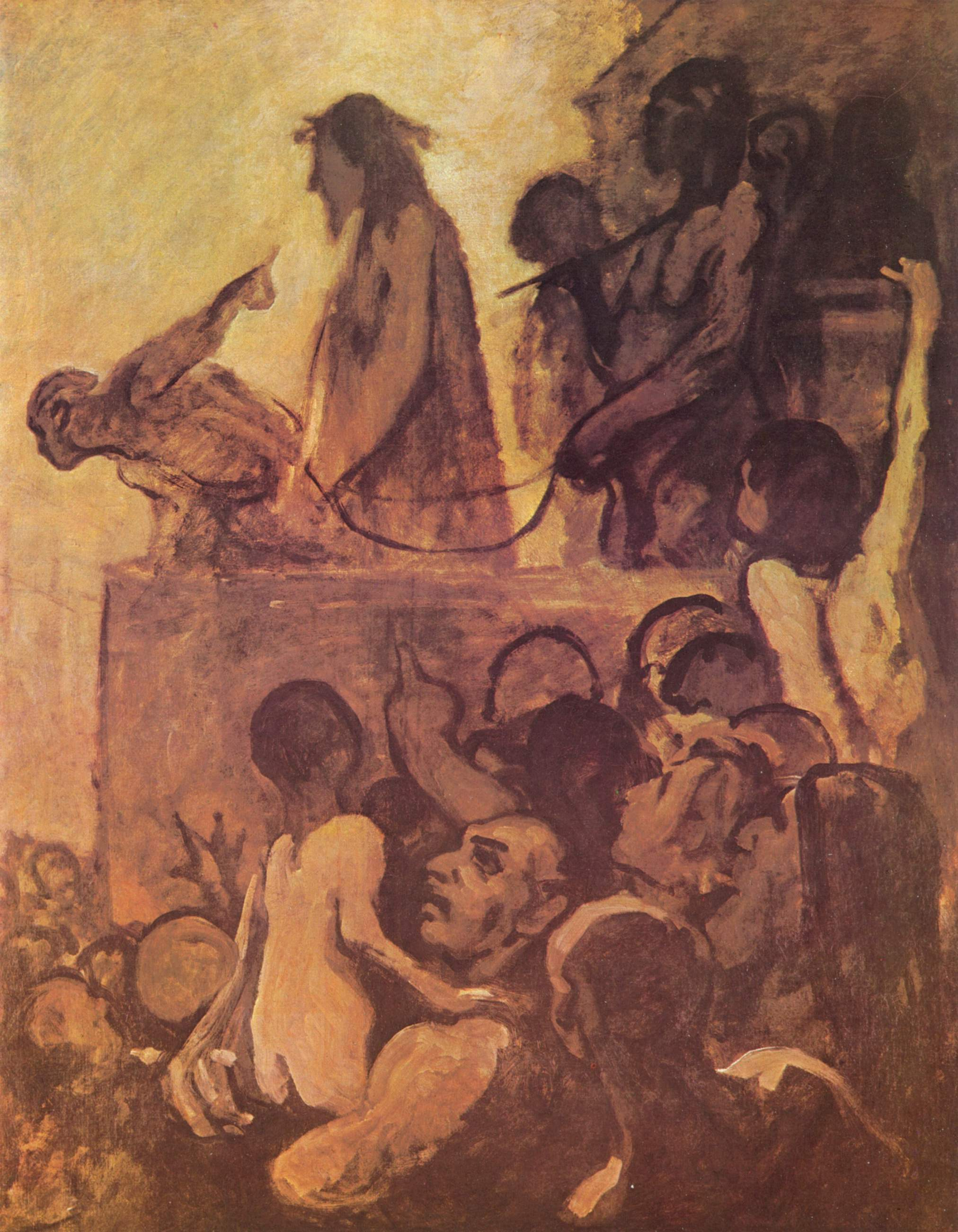
- Artist: Honoré Daumier
- Year: 1850
- Medium: oil on canvas
- Dimensions: 163 cm × 130 cm (64 in × 51 in)
- Location: Museum Folkwang, Essen

Ecce Homo is an unfinished oil-on-canvas painting by the French painter and caricaturist Honoré Daumier, created in 1850. It is in the collection of the Museum Folkwang in Essen, Germany.

== Description ==
The painting, executed in undertones of various shades of brown, depicts a scene in the Good Friday trial of Jesus when Christ is presented to the mob as a figure of ridicule by Pontius Pilate with the words "Ecce homo", translated in the Bible as "behold the man", but more appropriately as an accusatory "look at this man". The viewer is situated in the crowd in a position where he can observe Christ standing still and resolute, silhouetted against a sacred light, and asked to decide whether to sympathise with him or with his tormentors.

The work is one of only a few that Daumier undertook on religious subjects, as distinct from his several depictions of contemporary French social inequalities.

== Reception ==
James Romaine stated that this is "one of the most haunting images of Jesus Christ produced in nineteenth-century France. Part of this painting’s success, as an example of the Realist method applied to a biblical narrative, is the direct engagement that the work of art establishes between the subject and the viewer./ (...) As a subject highlighting the corruption of a justice system, the trial of Christ iconographically fits within a recurring theme in Daumier’s art. The mob gathered to taunt Christ recalls contemporary episodes of political unrest frequently evoked in nineteenth-century Realist art."

The painting was included by French writer Michel Butor in his book selecting 105 decisive works of Western painting.

== See also ==
- 100 Great Paintings, 1980 BBC series
