= Gloria.tv =

Catholic right-wing video-sharing and news site

- Website: www.gloria.tv
- Commercial: No
- Launched: 2005; 21 years ago
- Current status: active

Gloria.tv is an internet-based self-identified Catholic video-sharing and news site. It was created in Switzerland in 2005. As of 2017, it appeared to be based in Moldova with a contact address in Moscow. In 2017, the registered office was moved to Dover in the state of Delaware in the USA. As of 2019, 'gloria.tv' is a production of Church Social Media Inc.

Example of Gloria.tv editorial content on harassment of anti-abortion protestors in Austria

== History ==
=== Reto Nay ===
Roman Catholic priest Reto Nay is co-founder of the multilingual video portal 'gloria.tv', and one of the two priests working for 'gloria.tv', along with Markus Doppelbauer. On 22 January 2009, 'gloria.tv' published a text that downplayed the Holocaust. Nay refused to delete it, telling the Linz diocesan newspaper that "the whole Catholic spectrum is needed". Media law expert Walter Berka explained that there was a serious suspicion of a violation of the law banning National Socialist re-activation. Nay stated that Austrian or German law was not decisive for 'gloria.tv', since the website was registered in Moldova.

On the evening of 13 March 2013, Reto Nay was dismissed without notice by the Tujetsch parish. The Diocese of Chur called on him to resign immediately from his activities as a pastor. In March 2013, the Graubündner Kantonspolizei (cantonal police of Graubünden) initiated an investigation in connection with 'gloria.tv'. On 15 March 2013, Bishop Huonder also removed Nay from office. Nay attributed this to a "witch hunt". The parish office in Sedrun announced, on 15 March 2013, that Reto Nay had disappeared the day before and was no longer traceable. From April 2013, Nay preached again on 'gloria.tv' and reported to the diocese of Chur, his whereabouts remained unknown, for the time being.

According to 'gloria.tv', Nay was active on the Greek island of Patmos in the following years. According to contributions on 'gloria.tv', he preached in November 2017 in St. Pelagiberg (St. Gallen) in Switzerland.

== Web portal ==
The individuals responsible for 'gloria.tv' have been difficult to determine. The website was founded by Reto Nay in Switzerland, but since 2014 his name is no longer listed on the website. 'Gloria.tv' was apparently produced in Vienna, but was registered in the Republic of Moldova and describes itself as a "private initiative that is not directly linked to the ecclesiastical hierarchy". There was a contact address in Moscow, but no e-mail address or telephone number. In 2017, the registered office was moved to Dover in the state of Delaware in the U.S.A.

=== Controversy ===
On February 18, 2013, the English version of 'gloria.tv' showed pictures of German bishops with swastikas because they had allowed the use of the oral contraceptive in the hospitals of their dioceses. The German Bishops' Conference expressly dissociated itself from the website and announced that in the future contents of the church website 'kirche.tv' could no longer be used by 'gloria.tv'. Already in mid-January, the television editorial office of the diocese of Würzburg had deleted its channel on 'gloria.tv', saying that "... the site was no longer an environment in which we want to see our contributions". The daily blessing produced under the care of the German Bishops' Conference had to be removed from 'gloria.tv' on 20 February 2013, after a prohibition order by the Catholic Television Workers' Office. Burkhard Hose, pastor of the Catholic University Community of Würzburg, filed a criminal complaint against 'gloria.tv' for using marks of unconstitutional organisations.

In March 2013, 'gloria.tv' called reporters from Spiegel TV, who had conducted research in Switzerland via the video portal, "stalkers" and accused them of Nazi methods; 'gloria.tv' once again used the swastika, this time combined with the 'Spiegel' TV logo. On March 12, 2013, three 'gloria.tv' employees had violently attacked a RTL camera team, injuring one RTL camera team member slightly.

The news staff of the site have been very critical of the papacy of Pope Francis, as well as critical of many other bishops and clergy within the modern church. It has been involved in some controversies between it and a few dioceses in the German-speaking world. Journalist and writer Michael Sean Winters has characterized "gloria.tv" as an unintentional "... spoof of rightwing Catholics in the media... undertaken in earnest".

In 2013, Die Zeit identified " 'Gloria tv' as "aggressive and right-wing". In 2017, BuzzFeed News found that of the most viral Facebook articles about Angela Merkel, seven were either false or misleading. One of those was from 'gloria.tv' which featured a clip representing Merkel as saying: "Germans have to accept foreigners' violence", when what was actually said was: "The thing here is to ensure security on the ground and to eradicate the causes of violence in the society at the same time. This applies to all parts of the society, but we have to accept that the number of crimes is particularly high among young immigrants. Therefore, the theme of integration is connected with the issue of violence prevention in all parts of our society."

According to Spiegel Online: " 'Gloria.tv' is a kind of YouTube for Catholic radicals... But, instead of the "Good News", the site mainly spreads hatred. Hatred of homosexuals, hatred of abortion advocates and hatred of Christian reformers." Viennese lawyer Georg Bürstmayr comments: "If 'gloria.tv' were established as a company in the E.U., I think the portal would have been shut down long ago."

According to a 2013 statement by the website, the website receives about 2 million visits each month and contained 400,000 media files.
