= Ecce Homo (Bosch, Indianapolis) =

Painting by a follower of Hieronymus Bosch

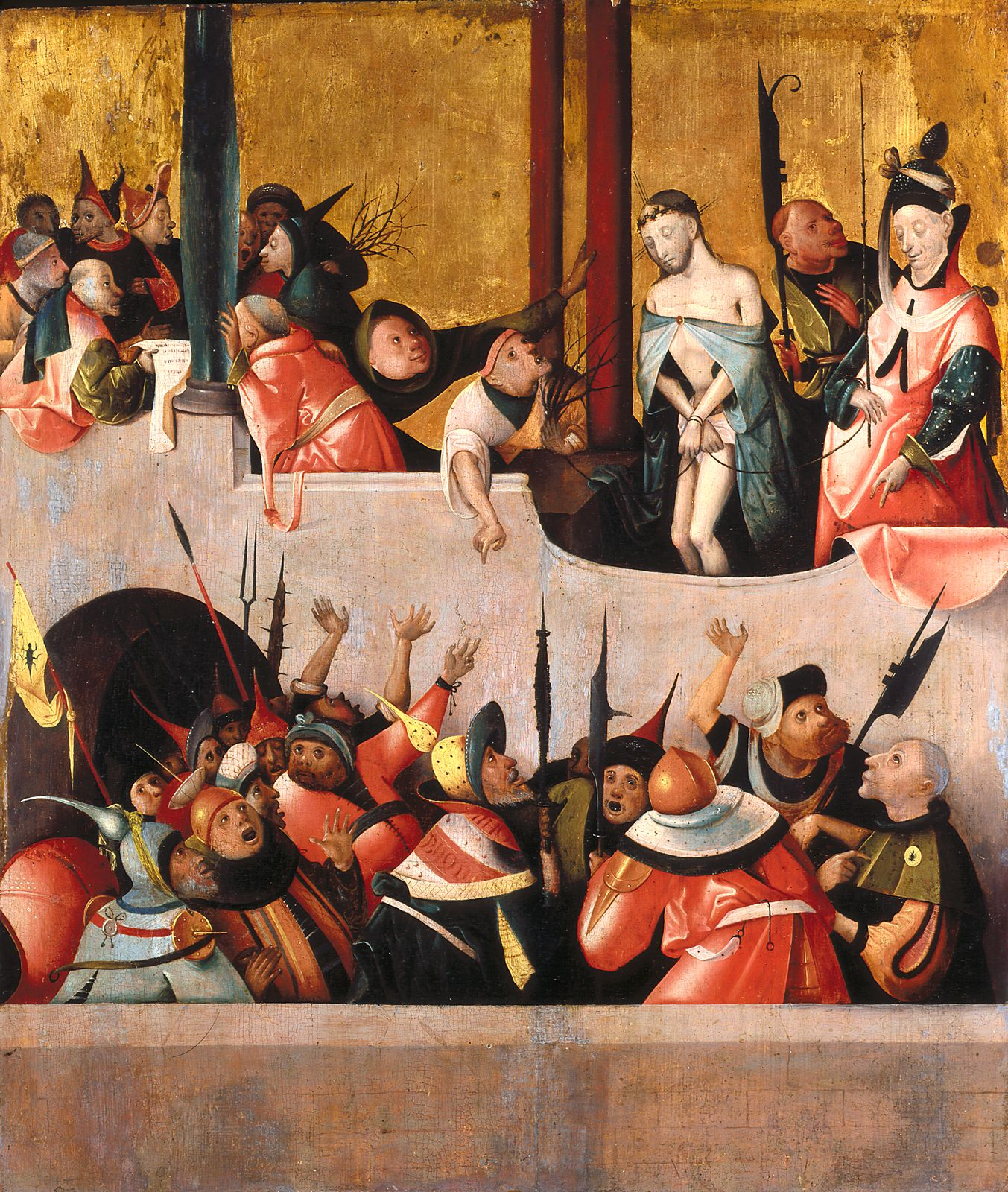
- Artist: follower of Hieronymus Bosch
- Year: 1510s
- Medium: Oil on panel
- Dimensions: 52 cm × 54 cm (20 in × 21 in)
- Location: Indianapolis Museum of Art, Indianapolis

Ecce Homo is a painting by a follower of the Netherlandish painter Hieronymus Bosch. It depicts the presentation of Jesus Christ by Pontius Pilate to the throngs of Jerusalem. Ecce homo is the latin phrase spoken by Pilate, which is where the title comes from. This painting is at the Indianapolis Museum of Art in Indianapolis, Indiana; it is closely similar to one at the Philadelphia Museum of Art.

They are not to be confused with the 1470s Bosch painting of the same name.

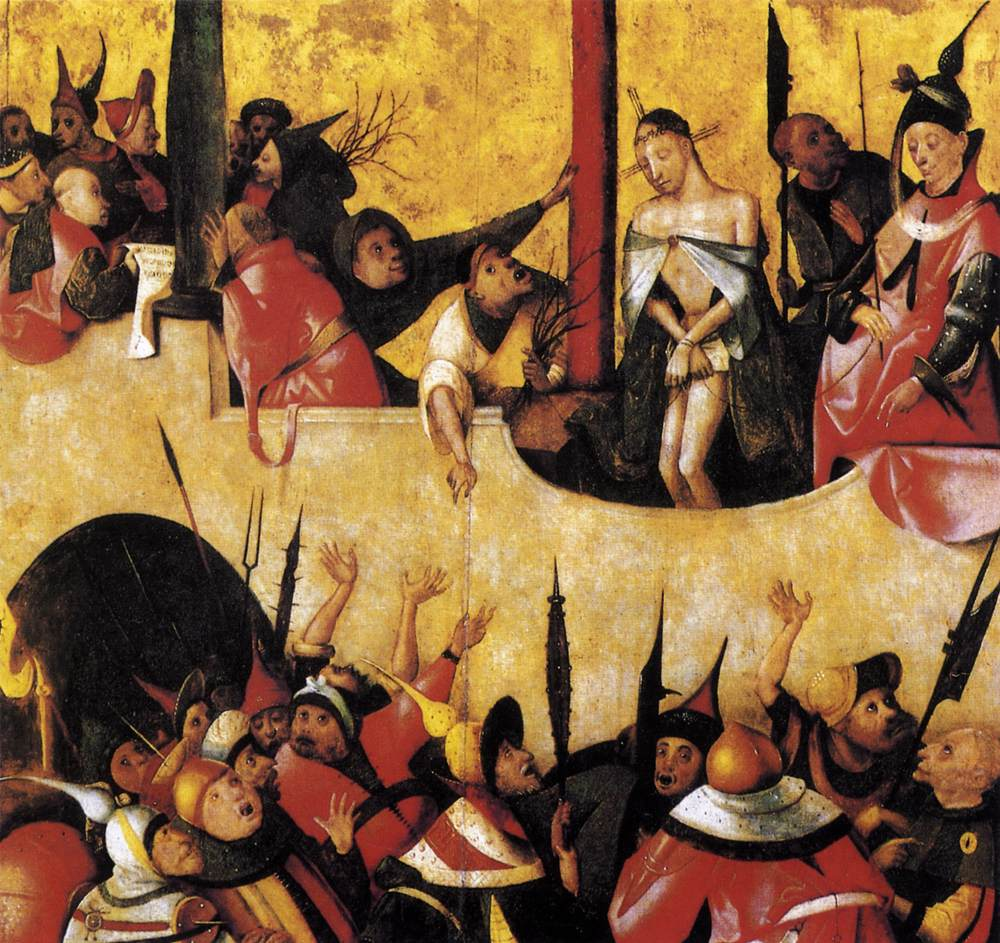
Ecce homo: version at the Philadelphia Museum of Art

== Sources ==
- Gibson, Walter S (1973). Hieronymus Bosch. New York: Thames and Hudson. ISBN 0-500-20134-X
