= Ecce Homo (Mantegna) =

Painting by Andrea Mantegna

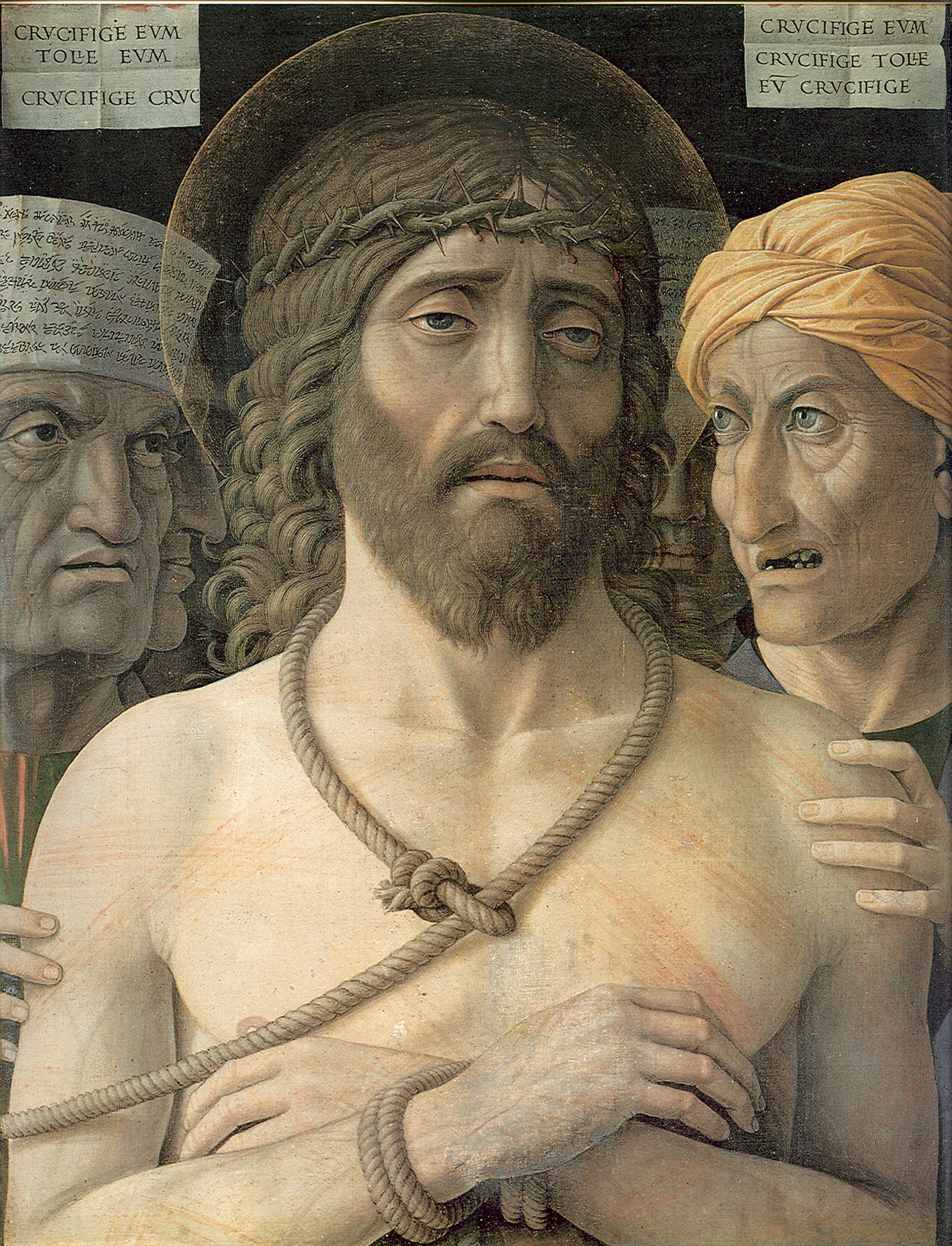
- Artist: Andrea Mantegna
- Year: ~1500
- Medium: tempera on canvas
- Dimensions: 72 cm × 54 cm (28 in × 21 in)
- Location: Musée Jacquemart-André, Paris, France

Ecce Homo is a painting by the Renaissance painter Andrea Mantegna. It is conserved at Musée Jacquemart-André in Paris. It depicts the presentation of Jesus Christ crowned with thorns.

== Characters ==
Besides Jesus, five people are represented: two on the left, one on the right, and two behind. The person on the left is supposed to be a Jew, and the one on the right in a turban, an old woman.

== Text ==
In the painting, two messages can be seen in Latin script: Crvcifige evm[.] tolle evm[.] crvcifige crvc[...] ("crucify him, trap him, crucify [in the cross]") to the left and to the right the similar Crvcifige evm crvcifige tolle eṽ crvcifige ("crucify him, crucify, trap him, crucify"). The text on the left is pseudo-Hebrew in cursive script.
