= List of World War I aces credited with 5 victories =

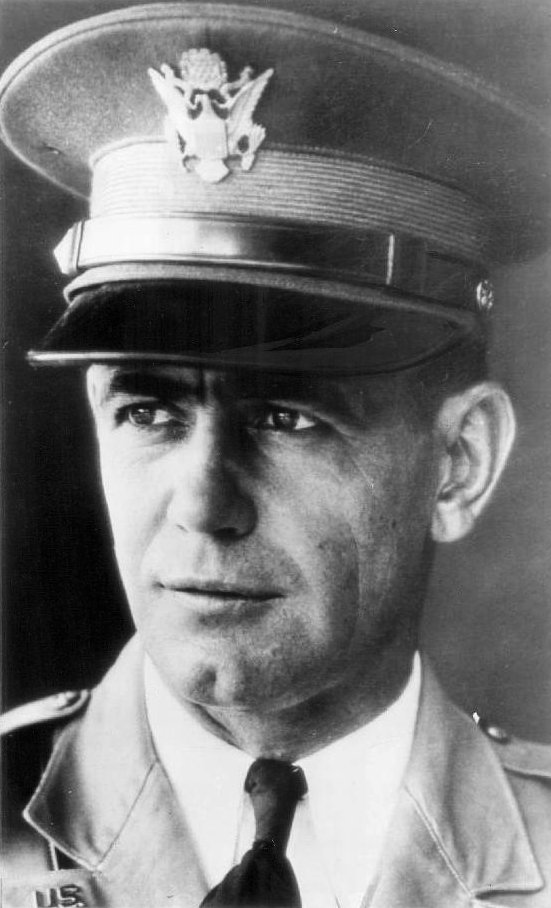
General Harold Huston George, when a young lieutenant, was a flying ace credited with five victories during World War I.

The term ace (now commonly flying ace) was first used by French newspapers during World War I, describing Adolphe Pégoud as l'as ('the ace'), after he downed five German aircraft. When aircraft began to shoot or force down other aircraft, systems to count "air victories" were subsequently developed. The American qualification of five victories eventually became the standard, even though other air services had previously used differing figures.

While "ace" status was most often won by fighter pilots, bomber and reconnaissance crews, and observers in two-seater aircraft such as the Bristol F.2b ("Bristol Fighter"), also destroyed enemy aircraft. If a two-seater aircraft destroyed an aircraft, both crew members were credited with a victory. Because pilots usually teamed with differing observer/gunners in two-seater aircraft, an observer might be an ace when his pilot was not, and vice versa. The few aces among combat aviators have historically accounted for the majority of air-to-air victories in military history.

Loss of records by mischance and the passage of time complicates reconstructing the actual count for given aces. The scores presented in the list cannot be definitive, but are based on itemized lists that are the best available sources of information. Aces are listed after verifying the date and location of combat, and the foe vanquished, for every victory accredited by an aviator's home air service using their own aerial victory standards. Those victories for which the evidence is unavailable or fragmentary have been excluded from the victory count.

== List ==
Name	Country	Air service(s)	Victories
Albert Achard	France	Aéronautique Militaire	5
John Aldridge	United Kingdom	Royal Flying Corps, Royal Air Force	5
Michele Allasia	Italy	Corpo Aeronautico Militare	5
Antonio Amantea	Italy	Corpo Aeronautico Militare	5
George Benson Anderson	Canada	Royal Naval Air Service, Royal Air Force	5
Arnold Ansell	United Kingdom	Royal Flying Corps, Royal Air Force	5
D'Urban Armstrong	Union of South Africa	Royal Flying Corps, Royal Air Force	5
Anthony Arnold	United Kingdom	Royal Naval Air Service, Royal Air Force	5
Maurice Arnoux	France	Aéronautique Militaire	5
Jean Arpheuil	France	Aéronautique Militaire	5
Edward Asbury	United Kingdom	Royal Flying Corps, Royal Air Force	5
Lionel Ashfield	United Kingdom	Royal Naval Air Service, Royal Air Force	5
Rupert Atkinson	United Kingdom	Royal Flying Corps, Royal Air Force	5
Hans Auer	German Empire	Luftstreitkräfte	5<
Frank Babbage	United Kingdom	Royal Flying Corps, Royal Air Force	5
William T. Badham	United States	Aéronautique Militaire, US Army Air Service, United States Army Air Force	5
Lovell Baker	United Kingdom	Royal Flying Corps, Royal Air Force	5
Yves F. Barbaza	France	Aéronautique Militaire	5
Andre Barcat	France	Aéronautique Militaire	5
Bernard Bartels	German Empire	Luftstreitkräfte	5
Auguste Baux	France	Aéronautique Militaire	5
Louis Bawlf	Canada	Royal Naval Air Service, Royal Air Force, Royal Canadian Air Force	5
Dumitru Bădulescu	Romania	Corpul de Aviație Român	5
Sebastiano Bedendo	Italy	Corpo Aeronautico Militare	5
Charles Gordon Bell	United Kingdom	Royal Flying Corps, Royal Air Force	5
William Benger	United Kingdom	Royal Flying Corps	5
Risdon Mackenzie Bennett	United Kingdom	Royal Naval Air Service, Royal Air Force	5
Ronald Berlyn	United Kingdom	Royal Naval Air Service, Royal Air Force	5
Joachim von Bertrab	German Empire	Luftstreitkräfte	5
Rudolf Besel	German Empire	Luftstreitkräfte	5
Otto Bieleit	German Empire	Luftstreitkräfte	5
Frank Billinge	United Kingdom	Royal Flying Corps, Royal Air Force	5
Eduard Blaas	German Empire	Luftstreitkräfte	5
Basil Blackett	United Kingdom	Australian Flying Corps, Royal Air Force	5
George Walker Blaiklock	Canada	Royal Flying Corps, Royal Air Force	5
Arthur Winston Blake	Union of South Africa	Royal Flying Corps, Royal Air Force	5
Georges Blanc	France	Aéronautique Militaire	5
Alfred Blenkiron	United Kingdom	Royal Flying Corps, Royal Air Force	5
Charles Blizard	United Kingdom	Royal Flying Corps, Royal Air Force	5
Marcel Bloch	France	Aéronautique Militaire	5
Hans-Helmut von Boddien	German Empire	Luftstreitkräfte	5
Erich Bönisch	German Empire	Luftstreitkräfte	5
William Otway Boger	Canada	Royal Flying Corps, Royal Air Force	5
William Bond	United Kingdom	Royal Flying Corps, Royal Air Force	5
Edward Borgfeldt Booth	Canada	Royal Flying Corps, Royal Air Force	5
Gustav Borm	German Empire	Luftstreitkräfte	5
Charles Borzecki	France	Aéronautique Militaire	5
Alan Bott	United Kingdom	Royal Flying Corps, Royal Air Force	5
William Bottrill	Canada	Royal Flying Corps, Royal Air Force	5
Francis Bowles	United Kingdom	Royal Flying Corps, Royal Air Force	5
Hans Bowski	German Empire	Luftstreitkräfte	5
Herbert Boy	German Empire	Luftstreitkräfte	5
Harold Koch Boysen	United States	Royal Flying Corps, Royal Air Force	5
Otto von Breiten-Landenberg	German Empire	Luftstreitkräfte	5
Godfrey Brembridge	United Kingdom	Royal Flying Corps, Royal Air Force	5
Orlando Bridgeman	United Kingdom	Royal Flying Corps, Royal Air Force	5
Allan Brown	Australia	Australian Flying Corps	5
Sydney Brown	United States	Royal Flying Corps, Royal Air Force	5
John Bruce Norton	United Kingdom	Royal Flying Corps, Royal Air Force	5
Harold Buckley	United States	US Army Air Service	5
Alexandre Buisson	France	Aéronautique Militaire	5
Friedrich-Karl Burckhardt	German Empire	Luftstreitkräfte	5
Malcolm Burger	Union of South Africa	Royal Air Force	5
Julius Busa	Austro-Hungarian Empire	Luftfahrtruppen	5
Joseph Callaghan	United Kingdom	Royal Flying Corps, Royal Air Force	5
Lawrence Callahan	United States	Royal Air Force, US Army Air Service	5
Umberto Calvello	Italy	Corpo Aeronautico Militare	5
Douglas Cameron	United Kingdom	Royal Flying Corps, Royal Air Force	5
Pierre Cardon	France	Aéronautique Militaire	5
Edward Caulfield-Kelly	United Kingdom	Royal Flying Corps, Royal Air Force	5
Lucien Cayol	France	Aéronautique Militaire	5
James Child	United Kingdom	Royal Flying Corps, Royal Air Force	5
Karl Christ	German Empire	Luftstreitkräfte	5
Alexander Goodlet Clark	Australia	Australian Flying Corps	5
William Clarke	United Kingdom	Royal Flying Corps, Royal Air Force	5
Lewis Collins	United Kingdom	Royal Flying Corps, Royal Air Force	5
Harry Compton	Canada	Royal Flying Corps, Royal Air Force	5
Everett Cook	United States	Aéronautique Militaire, US Army Air Service	5
Antoine Cordonnier	France	Aéronautique Militaire	5
George J. Cox	Australia	Australian Flying Corps	5
George M. Cox	United Kingdom	Royal Flying Corps, Royal Air Force	5
Fergus Craig	United Kingdom	Royal Air Force	5
Kelvin Crawford	United Kingdom	Royal Flying Corps, Royal Air Force	5
Gerard Crole	United Kingdom	Royal Flying Corps, Royal Air Force	5
John Crompton	Canada	Royal Flying Corps, Royal Air Force	5
Theodor Croneiss	German Empire	Luftstreitkräfte	5
Robert James Cullen	United Kingdom	Royal Flying Corps, Royal Air Force	5
Lumsden Cummings	Canada	Royal Flying Corps, Royal Air Force	5
Frederick Cunninghame	United Kingdom	Royal Flying Corps, Royal Air Force	5
Wilhelm Cymera	German Empire	Luftstreitkräfte	5
Sydney Dalrymple	Australia	Royal Flying Corps, Royal Air Force	5
Charles Darwin	United Kingdom	Royal Flying Corps, Royal Air Force	5
Clive Davies	United Kingdom	Royal Flying Corps, Royal Air Force	5
Llewelyn Davies	United Kingdom	Royal Flying Corps	5
Miles Day	United Kingdom	Royal Naval Air Service	5
Honoré de Bonald	France	Aéronautique Militaire	5
Philip De Fontenay	United Kingdom	Royal Flying Corps, Royal Air Force	5
Jean De Gaillard De la Valden	France	Aéronautique Militaire	5
August Delling	German Empire	Luftstreitkräfte	5
Andre Delorme	France	Aéronautique Militaire	5
Bruno De Roeper	United Kingdom	Royal Naval Air Service, Royal Air Force	5
Charles R. d'Olive	United States	US Army Air Service	5
Edward Barfoot Drake	United Kingdom	Royal Naval Air Service, Royal Air Force	5
Jean Dubois de Gennes	France	Aéronautique Militaire	5
Chester S. Duffus	Canada	Royal Flying Corps, Royal Air Force	5
William Dyke	United Kingdom	Royal Flying Corps, Royal Air Force	5
Arthur Easterbrook	United States	Royal Air Force, US Army Air Service	5
Edward Eaton	Canada	Royal Flying Corps, Royal Air Force	5
Charles Eddy	Union of South Africa	Royal Flying Corps, Royal Air Force	5
Herbert James Edwards	Australia	Royal Flying Corps, Royal Air Force	5
Horace Eldon	United Kingdom	Royal Flying Corps, Royal Air Force	5
Hugh William Elliott	United Kingdom	Royal Flying Corps, Royal Air Force	5
William Elliott	Canada	Royal Flying Corps, Royal Air Force	5
Sidney Emerson Ellis	Canada	Royal Naval Air Service	5
Henry Evans	United Kingdom	Royal Air Force	5
Wilhelm Fahlbusch	German Empire	Luftstreitkräfte	5
Jean-Paul Favre de Thierrens	France	Aéronautique Militaire	5
Ernest Foot	United Kingdom	Royal Flying Corps, Royal Air Force	5
George W. Furlow	United States	US Army Air Service	5
Victor Fyodorov	Russia	Aéronautique Militaire	5
Hudson Fysh	Australia	Australian Flying Corps, Royal Air Force	5
Ludwig Gaim	German Empire	Luftstreitkräfte	5
Richard Gammon	United Kingdom	Royal Air Force	5
Pierre Gauderman	France	Aéronautique Militaire	5
George Gauld	Canada	Royal Flying Corps, Royal Air Force	5
Harold Huston George	United States	US Army Air Service, United States Army Air Corps, United States Army Air Forces	5
Eugène Gilbert	France	Aéronautique Militaire	5
Dennis Henry Stacey Gilbertson	United Kingdom	Royal Flying Corps, Royal Air Force	5
Johannes Gildemeister	German Empire	Luftstreitkräfte	5
Wilfred Bertie Giles	United Kingdom	Royal Flying Corps, Royal Air Force	5
John Gillanders	Canada	Royal Flying Corps, Royal Air Force	5
William John Gillespie	Canada	Royal Flying Corps, Royal Air Force	5
Juri Gilsher	Russia	Imperial Russian Air Service	5
William Gilson	United Kingdom	Royal Naval Air Service, Royal Flying Corps, Royal Air Force	5
Harry Gompertz	United Kingdom	Royal Flying Corps, Royal Air Force	5
Michael Gonne	United Kingdom	Royal Flying Corps, Royal Air Force	5
Herbert Barrett Good	United Kingdom	Royal Flying Corps, Royal Air Force	5
Henry Goodison	United Kingdom	Royal Flying Corps, Royal Air Force	5
Kenneth Gopsill	United Kingdom	Royal Flying Corps	5
Richard Gordon-Bennett	United Kingdom	Royal Flying Corps, Royal Air Force	5
Ronald Graham	United Kingdom	Royal Naval Air Service, Royal Air Force	5
Edward Grange	Canada	Royal Naval Air Service, Royal Air Force	5
Charles Gossage Grey	United States	Aéronautique Militaire, US Army Air Service	5
Edward Gribben	United Kingdom	Royal Flying Corps, Royal Air Force	5
Hugh Griffith	Canada	Royal Flying Corps, Royal Air Force	5
William Grossart	United Kingdom	Royal Flying Corps, Royal Air Force	5
Francis Guerrier	France	Aéronautique Militaire	5
Joseph-Henri Guiget	France	Aéronautique Militaire	5
Siegfried Gussmann	German Empire	Luftstreitkräfte	5
Kurt Haber	German Empire	Luftstreitkräfte	5
Edward Haight	United States	US Army Air Service, United States Army Air Forces	5
Georges Halberger	France	Aéronautique Militaire	5
John Playford Hales	Canada	Royal Naval Air Service, Royal Air Force	5
John Herbert Hall	United Kingdom	Royal Flying Corps, Royal Air Force	5
Robert Hall	Union of South Africa	Royal Flying Corps, Royal Air Force	5
Joseph E. Hallonquist	Canada	Royal Flying Corps, Royal Air Force	5
Paul Hamot	France	Aéronautique Militaire	5
Earl Hand	Canada	Royal Flying Corps, Royal Air Force	5
August Hanko	German Empire	Luftstreitkräfte	5
Howard Harker	United Kingdom	Royal Flying Corps, Royal Air Force	5
Arthur Harris	United Kingdom	Royal Flying Corps, Royal Air Force	5
Charles Harrison	United Kingdom	Royal Flying Corps, Royal Air Force	5
William Harrop	United Kingdom	Royal Flying Corps, Royal Air Force	5
Edward Hartigan	United Kingdom	Royal Flying Corps	5
Marius Hasdenteufel	France	Aéronautique Militaire	5
Marcel Hauss	France	Aéronautique Militaire	5
Hugh Hay	United Kingdom	Royal Flying Corps, Royal Air Force	5
Roger Hay	United Kingdom	Royal Flying Corps	5
Eustace Headlam	Australia	Australian Flying Corps	5
James Healy	United States	US Army Air Service, United States Army Air Forces	5
Fredrich Hefty	Austro-Hungarian Empire	Luftfahrtruppen	5
Friedrich Hengst	German Empire	Luftstreitkräfte	5
Robert Herring	United Kingdom	Royal Flying Corps, Royal Air Force	5
Kurt Hetze	German Empire	Luftstreitkräfte	5
George Frederick Hines	United Kingdom	Royal Air Force	5
William Hodgkinson	United Kingdom	Royal Flying Corps, Royal Air Force	5
Les Holden	Australia	Australian Flying Corps	5
Robert Holme	United Kingdom	Royal Flying Corps, Royal Air Force	5
Paul Homo	France	Aéronautique Militaire	5
Percy Howe	Union of South Africa	Royal Flying Corps, Royal Air Force	5
Malcolm Clifford Howell	United States	Royal Flying Corps, Royal Air Force	5
David Hughes	United Kingdom	Royal Flying Corps	5
Eric Yorath Hughes	United Kingdom	Royal Flying Corps	5
Thomas Hunter	United Kingdom	Royal Air Force	5
Cyril Edward Hurst	United Kingdom	Royal Flying Corps, Royal Air Force	5
George Hyde	United Kingdom	Royal Flying Corps, Royal Air Force	5
Jean Jannekeyn	France	Aéronautique Militaire	5
Arthur Gordon Jarvis	United Kingdom	Royal Flying Corps, Royal Air Force	5
Charles Jeffs	United Kingdom	Royal Flying Corps, Royal Air Force	5
Olaus Johnsen	United Kingdom	Royal Flying Corps, Royal Air Force	5
Percy Griffith Jones	United Kingdom	Royal Flying Corps, Royal Air Force	5
Hermann Juhnke	German Empire	Luftstreitkräfte	5
Werner Junck	German Empire	Luftstreitkräfte	5
M. B. Kilroy	United Kingdom	Royal Flying Corps, Royal Air Force	5
James Knowles	United States	US Army Air Service	5
Wilhelm Kohlbach	German Empire	Luftstreitkräfte	5
Nikolai Kokorin	Russia	Imperial Russian Air Service	5
Johann Kopka	German Empire	Luftstreitkräfte	5
Julius Kowalczik	Austro-Hungarian Empire	Luftfahrtruppen	5
Frederick J. Kydd	United Kingdom	Royal Flying Corps, Royal Air Force	5
Franz Lahner	Austro-Hungarian Empire	Luftfahrtruppen	5
Kenneth Laing	United Kingdom	Royal Flying Corps, Royal Air Force	5
Conrad Lally	Canada	Royal Flying Corps, Royal Air Force	5
Friedrich Lang	Austro-Hungarian Empire	Luftfahrtruppen	5
David Langlands	United Kingdom	Royal Flying Corps, Royal Air Force	5
Sydney Frank Langstone	United Kingdom	Royal Naval Air Service, Royal Air Force	5
Johann Lasi	Austro-Hungarian Empire	Luftfahrtruppen	5
James Latta	United Kingdom	Royal Flying Corps, Royal Air Force	5
Frederic Laurence	United Kingdom	Royal Flying Corps, Royal Air Force	5
Didier Lecour Grandmaison	France	Aéronautique Militaire	5
Giulio Lega	Italy	Corpo Aeronautico Militare	5
Ernst Leman	Russia	Imperial Russian Air Service	5
James Lennox	United Kingdom	Royal Flying Corps, Royal Air Force	5
Pierre Leroy De Boiseaumarie	France	Aéronautique Militaire	5
Wilhelm Leusch	German Empire	Luftstreitkräfte	5
Georges Lienhart	France	Aéronautique Militaire	5
John Douglas Lightbody	United Kingdom	Royal Naval Air Service, Royal Air Force	5
Ernest Lindup	Union of South Africa	Royal Flying Corps, Royal Air Force	5
Robert Hazen Little	Canada	Royal Flying Corps, Royal Air Force	5
John Lloyd Williams	United Kingdom	Royal Flying Corps, Royal Air Force	5
Heinrich Lorenz	German Empire	Luftstreitkräfte	5
Reginald Lowe	United Kingdom	Royal Air Force	5
Frederick Luff	United States	US Army Air Service attached to Royal Air Force	5
Charles Lupton	United Kingdom	Royal Naval Air Service, Royal Air Force	5
Colin Geen Orr MacAndrew	United Kingdom	Royal Flying Corps	5
Ross Morrison MacDonald	Canada	Royal Flying Corps, Royal Air Force	5
Harry MacKay	United Kingdom	Royal Flying Corps	5
Loudoun MacLean	United Kingdom	Royal Flying Corps, Royal Air Force	5
Bela Macourek	Austro-Hungarian Empire	Luftfahrtruppen	5
John Finley Noel MacRae	Canada	Royal Flying Corps, Royal Air Force	5
Francis Magoun	United States	Royal Flying Corps, Royal Air Force	5
Paul Malavialle	France	Aéronautique Militaire	5
Patrick Scarsfield Manley	Canada	Royal Flying Corps, Royal Air Force	5
Leslie Morton Mansbridge	United Kingdom	Royal Flying Corps, Royal Air Force	5
William Stanley Mansell	United Kingdom	Royal Flying Corps	5
Federico Martinengo	Italy	Corpo Aeronautico Militare	5
Hans Marwede	German Empire	Luftstreitkräfte	5
Stanley Masding	United Kingdom	Royal Flying Corps, Royal Air Force	5
Guido Masiero	Italy	Corpo Aeronautico Militare	5
Jack Mason	United Kingdom	Royal Flying Corps, Royal Air Force	5
William Maxted	United Kingdom	Royal Flying Corps, Royal Air Force	5
Ronald McClintock	United Kingdom	Royal Flying Corps, Royal Air Force	5
George McCormack	United Kingdom	Royal Air Force	5
John McNeaney	Canada	Royal Flying Corps, Royal Air Force	5
Russell Fern McRae	Canada	Royal Flying Corps, Royal Air Force	5
Amedeo Mecozzi	Italy	Corpo Aeronautico Militare	5
Harold Medlicott	United Kingdom	Royal Flying Corps, Royal Air Force	5
Francis Mellersh	United Kingdom	Royal Naval Air Service, Royal Air Force	5
Erich Meyer	German Empire	Luftstreitkräfte	5
Albert Mezergues	France	Aéronautique Militaire	5
Giorgio Michetti	Italy	Corpo Aeronautico Militare	5
Zenos Miller	United States	US Army Air Service	5
Kenneth Charles Mills	United Kingdom	Royal Flying Corps, Royal Air Force	5
Harold Molyneux	Canada	Royal Flying Corps, Royal Air Force	5
Paul Montange	France	Aéronautique Militaire	5
John Towlson Morgan	United Kingdom	Royal Flying Corps, Royal Air Force	5
William John Mostyn	United Kingdom	Royal Flying Corps, Royal Air Force	5
Harold Edgar Mott	Canada	Royal Naval Air Service, Royal Air Force	5
Redford Mulock	Canada	Royal Naval Air Service, Royal Air Force	5
John Murison	United Kingdom	Royal Flying Corps, Royal Air Force	5
Donald Frederick Murmann	United Kingdom	US Army Air Service, Royal Air Force	5
Ernest Mustard	Australia	Australian Flying Corps	5
Kurt Nachod	Austro-Hungarian Empire	Luftfahrtruppen	5
Hugh Nangle	United Kingdom	Royal Flying Corps, Royal Air Force	5
Roger Neville	United Kingdom	Royal Flying Corps, Royal Air Force	5
Thomas Henry Newsome	United Kingdom	Royal Air Force	5
Augustin Novak	Austro-Hungarian Empire	Luftfahrtruppen	5
Percy Olieff	United Kingdom	Royal Flying Corps, Royal Air Force	5
Thomas Alfred Oliver	United Kingdom	Royal Flying Corps	5
Ralph Ambrose O'Neill	United States	US Army Air Service	5
Ivan Orlov	Russia	Imperial Russian Air Service	5
Osborne Orr	United States	Royal Naval Air Service, Royal Air Force	5
Hans-Georg von der Osten	German Empire	Luftstreitkräfte	5
John Sidney Owens	United States	US Army Air Service	5
Antoine Paillard	France	Aéronautique Militaire	5
Karl Patzelt	Austro-Hungarian Empire	Luftfahrtruppen	5
Carrick Paul	New Zealand	Australian Flying Corps	5
Georges Pelletier d'Oisy	France	Aéronautique Militaire	5
Edward Pennell	United Kingdom	Royal Flying Corps, Royal Air Force	5
Andre Petit-Delchet	France	Aéronautique Militaire	5
Edmund Heaton Peverell	United Kingdom	Royal Flying Corps, Royal Air Force	5
Charles Pickthorn	United Kingdom	Royal Flying Corps, Royal Air Force	5
Gerald Pilditch	Union of South Africa	Royal Flying Corps, Royal Air Force	5
Alexander Pishvanov	Russia	Imperial Russian Air Service	5
Sidney Platel	United Kingdom	Royal Flying Corps, Royal Air Force	5
Constant Plessis	France	Aéronautique Militaire	5
George Ramsden Poole	United Kingdom	Royal Flying Corps, Royal Air Force	5
Kenneth Lee Porter	United States	US Army Air Service	5
François Portron	France	Aéronautique Militaire	5
Harold Johnstone Pratt	United Kingdom	Royal Flying Corps, Royal Air Force	5
Walbanke Ashby Pritt	United Kingdom	Royal Flying Corps, Royal Air Force	5
Thomas Proctor	United Kingdom	Royal Flying Corps, Royal Air Force	5
John Pugh	Canada	Royal Flying Corps, Royal Air Force	5
Hartley Pullan	United Kingdom	Royal Flying Corps, Royal Air Force	5
Eduard Pulpe	Russia	Aéronautique Militaire, Imperial Army Air Service	5
W. C Purvis	United Kingdom	Royal Flying Corps, Royal Air Force	5
Orville Ralston	United States	Royal Flying Corps, Royal Air Force, US Army Air Service, United States Army Air Corps, United States Army Air Forces	5
Arthur Rullion Rattray	United Kingdom	Royal Flying Corps, Royal Air Force	5
Georges Raymond	France	Aéronautique Militaire	5
John William Rayner	United Kingdom	Royal Flying Corps, Royal Air Force	5
Victor Regnier	France	Aéronautique Militaire	5
Guy Reid	United Kingdom	Royal Flying Corps	5
Leopold Reimann	German Empire	Luftstreitkräfte	5
Alessandro Resch	Italy	Corpo Aeronautico Militare	5
Charles Revol-Tissot	France	Aéronautique Militaire	5
Alan Incell Riley alias A. G. Riley	United Kingdom	Royal Flying Corps, Royal Air Force	5
Louis Rissacher	France	Aéronautique Militaire	5
Maurice Robert	France	Aéronautique Militaire	5
Norman Roberts	United Kingdom	Royal Flying Corps, Royal Air Force	5
John Robertson	United Kingdom	Royal Flying Corps	5
Paul Rodde	France	Aéronautique Militaire	5
Alois Rodlauer	Austro-Hungarian Empire	Luftfahrtruppen	5
Jacques Roques	France	Aéronautique Militaire	5
Hans Rosencrantz	German Empire	Luftstreitkräfte	5
Paul Rothe	German Empire	Luftstreitkräfte	5
Maurice Rousselle	France	Aéronautique Militaire	5
Richard Rübe	German Empire	Luftstreitkräfte	5
Theodor Rumpel	German Empire	Luftstreitkräfte	5
Giovanni Sabelli	Italy	Corpo Aeronautico Militare	5
Mikhail Safonov	Russia	Imperial Russian Air Service	5
William Sanday	United Kingdom	Royal Flying Corps, Royal Air Force	5
Robert Saundby	United Kingdom	Royal Flying Corps, Royal Air Force	5
Jacques Victor Sabattier de Vignolle	France	Aéronautique Militaire	5
Basile Saune	France	Aéronautique Militaire	5
Edward Sayers	United Kingdom	Royal Flying Corps, Royal Air Force	5
Johann Schlimpen	German Empire	Luftstreitkräfte	5
Roman Schneider	German Empire	Luftstreitkräfte	5
Herbert Schroeder	German Empire	Luftstreitkräfte	5
Friedrich Schumacher	German Empire	Luftstreitkräfte	5
Konrad Schwartz	German Empire	Luftstreitkräfte	5
Alan John Lance Scott	New Zealand	Royal Flying Corps, Royal Air Force	5
Joseph Powell Seabrook	United Kingdom	Royal Flying Corps, Royal Air Force	5
John Joseph Seerley Jr.	United States	US Army Air Service, United States Army Air Corps, United States Army Air Forces	5
Kurt Seit	German Empire	Luftstreitkräfte	5
Christopher Shannon	United Kingdom	Royal Flying Corps, Royal Air Force	5
Frank Sharpe	United Kingdom	Royal Flying Corps, Royal Air Force	5
Harold Goodman Shoemaker	United States	US Army Air Service attached to Royal Air Force, US Army Air Service	5
Eugen Siempelkamp	German Empire	Luftstreitkräfte	5
Francis Simonds	United States	US Army Air Service	5
Eric Landon Simonson	Australia	Australian Flying Corps	5
Lambert Sloot	United Kingdom	Royal Flying Corps, Royal Air Force	5
Wallace Alexander Smart	United Kingdom	Royal Flying Corps, Royal Air Force	5
George Henry Benjamin Smith	United Kingdom	Royal Flying Corps, Royal Air Force	5
Harry Coleman Smith	United Kingdom	Royal Naval Air Service, Royal Air Force	5
James Robert Smith	Canada	Royal Flying Corps, Royal Air Force	5
Sydney Philip Smith	United Kingdom	Royal Flying Corps, Royal Air Force	5
William Thomas Smith	United Kingdom	Royal Flying Corps, Royal Air Force, Royal Australian Air Force	5
Neil Smuts	Union of South Africa	Royal Flying Corps, Royal Air Force	5
Wilfred Sneath	United Kingdom	Royal Naval Air Service, Royal Air Force	5
Wilhelm Sommer	German Empire	Luftstreitkräfte	5
Ian Oliver Stead	Union of South Africa	Royal Flying Corps, Royal Air Force	5
Helmut Steinbrecher	German Empire	Luftstreitkräfte	5
Thomas Frederick Stephenson	United Kingdom	Royal Flying Corps	5
Frank Douglas Stevens	United Kingdom	Royal Flying Corps, Royal Air Force	5
Oliver Stewart	United Kingdom	Royal Flying Corps, Royal Air Force	5
Wilhelm Stör	German Empire	Luftstreitkräfte	5
Claud Stokes	United Kingdom	Royal Flying Corps, Royal Air Force	5
Victor Strahm	United States	US Army Air Service,	5
Karl Strünklenberg	German Empire	Luftstreitkräfte	5
Rudolf Szepessy-Sokol	Austro-Hungarian Empire	Luftfahrtruppen	5
Edgar Taylor	United States	Royal Flying Corps, Royal Air Force	5
Karl Teichmann	Austro-Hungarian Empire	Luftfahrtruppen	5
William Thaw	United States	Aéronautique Militaire, US Army Air Service	5
Wilhelm Thöne	German Empire	Luftstreitkräfte	5
Meredith Thomas	United Kingdom	Royal Flying Corps, Royal Air Force	5
Anthony Joseph Hill Thornton	United Kingdom	Royal Flying Corps, Royal Air Force	5
Alwin Thurm	German Empire	Luftstreitkräfte	5
William Tipton	United States	US Army Air Service attached to Royal Air Force, US Army Air Service, United States Army Air Corps	5
George Donald Tod	United States	Royal Flying Corps, Royal Air Force	5
Robert Miles Todd	United States	US Army Air Service	5
Oswald Traenkner	German Empire	Luftstreitkräfte	5
Herbert Travers	United Kingdom	Royal Naval Air Service, Royal Air Force	5
Gerold Tschentschel	German Empire	Luftstreitkräfte	5
John Seymour Turnbull	Australia	Royal Flying Corps, Royal Air Force	5
Arthur Henry Turner	United Kingdom	Royal Naval Air Service, Royal Air Force	5
Alfred Ulmer	German Empire	Luftstreitkräfte	5
Karl Urban	Austro-Hungarian Empire	Luftfahrtruppen	5
Gilbert J. Uteau	France	Aéronautique Militaire	5
Viktor Utgof	Russia	Black Sea Fleet, Imperial Russian Navy	5
John Vessey	United Kingdom	Royal Flying Corps	5
Hans Viebig	German Empire	Luftstreitkräfte	5
Pierre Violet-Marty	France	Aéronautique Militaire	5
Werner Wagener	German Empire	Luftstreitkräfte	5
Kenneth MacKenzie Walker	United Kingdom	Royal Flying Corps, Royal Air Force	5
William Walker	United Kingdom	Royal Flying Corps, Royal Air Force	5
John Wallwork	United Kingdom	Royal Flying Corps, Royal Air Force	5
Edward Henry Ward	United Kingdom	Royal Flying Corps, Royal Air Force	5
Hasso von Wedel	German Empire	Luftstreitkräfte	5
George Arthur Welsh	Canada	Royal Flying Corps, Royal Air Force	5
Pierre Wertheim (Wertheimer)	France	Aéronautique Militaire	5
Mortimer Sackville West	United Kingdom	Royal Flying Corps	5
Lewis Whitehead	United Kingdom	Royal Flying Corps, Royal Air Force	5
Charles Whitham	United Kingdom	Royal Flying Corps, Royal Air Force	5
Robert Kenneth Whitney	Canada	Royal Flying Corps, Royal Air Force	5
Ernst Wiessner	German Empire	Luftstreitkräfte	5
Edward George Herbert Caradoc Williams	United Kingdom	Royal Flying Corps	5
Francis Jefferies Williams	United Kingdom	Royal Flying Corps, Royal Air Force	5
Cecil Frederick Charles Wilson	United Kingdom	Royal Flying Corps, Royal Air Force	5
Rupert Randolph Winter	United Kingdom	Royal Naval Air Service	5
Kurt Wisseman	German Empire	Luftstreitkräfte	5
Franz Wognar	Austro-Hungarian Empire	Luftfahrtruppen	5
John Womersley	United Kingdom	Royal Flying Corps	5
Charles Woollven	United Kingdom	Royal Flying Corps, Royal Air Force	5
Charles Edward Worthington	United Kingdom	Royal Flying Corps, Royal Air Force	5
Victor Maslin Yeates	United Kingdom	Royal Flying Corps, Royal Air Force	5
Graham Conacher Young	United Kingdom	Royal Flying Corps, Royal Air Force	5
Martin Zander	German Empire	Luftstreitkräfte	5
Edmund Leonard Zink	United Kingdom	Royal Flying Corps, Royal Air Force	5
