= Homo (disambiguation) =

Homo is the taxonomical genus that includes modern humans (Homo sapiens sapiens).

Homo may also refer to:

== Latin and Greek terms ==
- Homo, Latin for "man", "human being", see Human
  - Homo sapiens
- Homo-, Greek prefix expressing the notion of "same, identical"
  - Homo, an abbreviation for homogenized milk
  - Homo-, in chemistry, a prefix indicating a homolog, an organic analog of next higher straight chain/ring size at some part of molecule
  - Homo (slang), an abbreviation for "homosexual", generally offensive

== People with the name ==
- Homo (surname), list of people with the surname Homo

== Arts, entertainment, and media ==
- Homo (journal), a bimonthly peer-reviewed scientific journal on human biology
- Homo, wolfhound in Victor Hugo's novel The Man Who Laughs

== Chemistry ==
- HOMO, highest occupied molecular orbital
- Homo- and nor- prefixes used to name certain structural analogs

== Other uses ==
- HomO, the Swedish Ombudsman against Discrimination on Grounds of Sexual Orientation

== See also ==
- Ecce Homo (disambiguation)
- Homos (disambiguation)
- Names for the human species
- Hetero (disambiguation)
