= Jean Arpheuil =

French flying ace

Jean Henry Maurice Arpheuil
- Born: 6 October 1892; Montluçon, Allier, France
- Died: 26 June 1920 (aged 27); Cambo-les-Bains, Labourd, France
- Military career
- Allegiance: France
- Branch: French Army
- Service years: 1913–1919
- Rank: Lieutenant
- Units: 121e Régiment d'Infanterie; Escadrille N.151/SPA.151
- Commands: Escadrille SPA.170
- Conflicts: World War I
- Awards: Legion d'honneur Croix de guerre

Lieutenant Jean Henry Maurice Arpheuil (6 October 1892 – 26 June 1920) was a French World War I flying ace credited with five aerial victories.

== Biography ==
Arpheuil was born in Montluçon, Allier, where his father was the manager of the hôtel de la gare. Arpheuil was conscripted for military service on 8 October 1913, joining the 121e Régiment d'Infanterie as a private. He was promoted to corporal on 17 February 1914. After the First World War broke out in August 1914 his regiment was soon in action, and he was promoted to sergeant on 2 September, and granted the temporary rank of sous-lieutenant on 15 October.

On 5 January 1915, Arpheuil was wounded in the face and back during a reconnaissance patrol at Saint Aurin on the Somme, soon afterwards receiving his first citation (à l'ordre du régiment) which praised his "qualities of courage and self-control." He returned to his regiment on 8 July for machine gun training, returning to the front lines on 4 August. He received a minor wound on 14 December 1915, and after recovering was posted to the machine gun training centre at Le Havre in early 1916. He requested a transfer back to front line service, which was soon granted, and he also received promotion to sous-lieutenant. On 23 April, after two months in the trenches, he was again hospitalised after contracting typhoid fever. He returned to the front on 1 June, but twelve days later was wounded by a shell explosion. During his convalescent leave in Paris he took the opportunity to marry Madeleine Horiot in the mairie of the 11th arrondissement on 10 August.

On 15 October Arpheuil was promoted to lieutenant, and he returned to duty on 20 November. He was transferred to the Army's aviation branch – the Aeronautique Militaire – on 15 January 1917. He received his basic flight training at the military flying school at Avord, and was awarded military pilot's certificate No. 5861 at Tours on 8 April. On 16 June he was posted to Escadrille N.151, a newly created unit stationed in Chaux near Belfort to fly Nieuport fighters. His unit saw little action for the rest of the year, at the end of which it began to receive SPAD fighters. Eventually Arpheuil's unit, now redesignated Escadrille SPA.151, was moved to the Oise after the start of the 1918 German spring offensive. On 27 May 1918 he claimed an aircraft shot down during a dogfight with five Germans, but was not credited. However, the following day he shot down an enemy biplane near Ressons-sur-Matz, and on 31 May he and Sergeant Thelot shot down an enemy two-seater over the French lines. The following day, 1 May, he and Sergeant Letu brought down another two-seater over St-Léger-au-Bois. He received his second citation on 19 June, and on 3 July as made a Chevalier of the Légion d'honneur. His third aerial victory earned him a third citation on 14 July. Arpheuil shot down an enemy two-seater solo on 20 July, receiving his fourth citation on 9 August.

On 13 September 1918 Arpheuil was appointed commander of a new unit, Escadrille SPA.170, stationed in Flanders as part of Groupe de Chasse 23. He joined the unit on 28 September, gaining his fifth aerial victory on 14 October, and earning his fifth citation. However, on 27 October 1918 he was hospitalised at Dunkirk, possibly suffering from the Spanish flu. After convalescent leave, he suffered a relapse in January 1919, and was relieved of command of his escadrille on 28 February. At a military hospital in Nice he was diagnosed with chronic post-influenza laryngitis and pleurisy. After spending the year convalescing, or in various hospitals, on 4 December 1919 he was discharged from the Army on medical grounds. He died on 26 June 1920 at a sanatorium at Cambo-les-Bains.
