= Château de Saint-Chaptes =

Castle in Occitania, France

Coordinates: 43°58′13″N 4°16′46″E

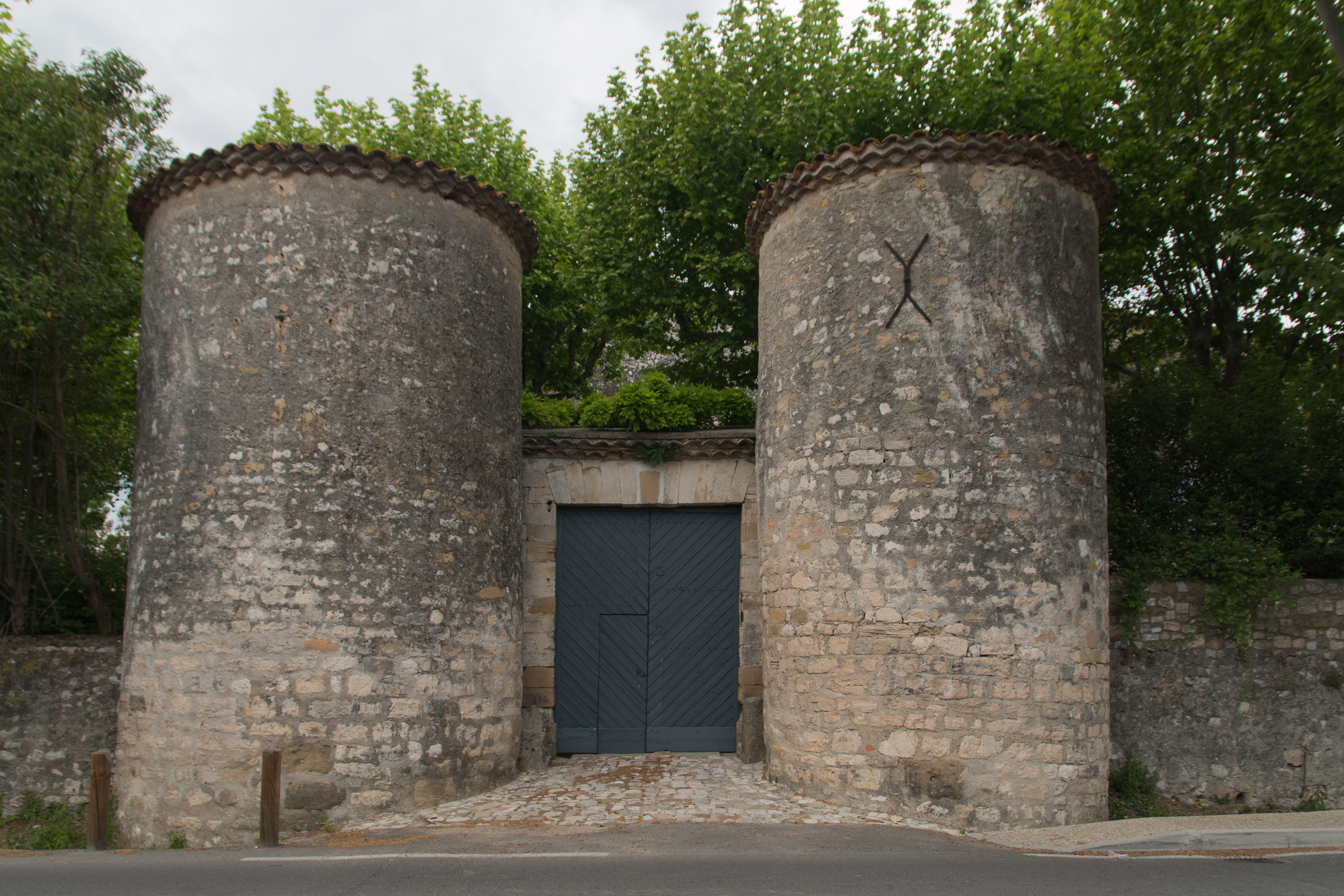
Door of the Castle of Saint-Chaptes

The Château de Saint-Chaptes is a modernised castle in the commune of Saint-Chaptes in the Gard département of France.

The medieval castle was built in the 13th century and modified in the 15th and 17th centuries. Protected by towers, it was surrounded by moats which have now been filled. The exact date of construction is unclear, but it is known that the castle was pillaged in 1217.

In 1623, it was enlarged for the stay of Louis XIII and Cardinal Richelieu to prepare for the Peace of Alais. In the 18th century, interior modification included the creation of a central access corridor and the creation of a grand staircase.

Under the First Empire, the building was updated in the current taste by the Countess de Brueys. The remains of the ramparts, dating back to the 14th century, include two towers whose height was halved during the Revolution, forming the entrance to the castle. The rampart itself was rebuilt in the 19th century.

Privately owned, the Château de Saint-Chaptes has been listed since 1998 as a monument historique by the French Ministry of Culture.

== See also ==
- List of castles in France
