= Sexarbores =

Ancient Celtic god

Sexarbores is an ancient Gallic god known only from inscriptions found in the Hautes-Pyrénées.

== Etymology ==
Sexarbores can be translated in Latin as 'six-trees'. It was probably originally a toponym.

Although cases of tree worshipping are attested in the Celtic world, the name may also have been used metonymically to denote an agrarian deity.

== Inscriptions ==
Sexarbores is only known from inscriptions found in the Pays d'Aspet, around Castelbiague and Arbas in France, whose forest probably fed the wood needs of the nearby city. Unlike most votive monuments of this region of Haute-Garonne, the altars in question give the names of divinities translated into Latin. Sexarbores seems to have been honored solely or mainly by Roman citizens, perhaps woodcutters.

- CIL, XIII, 129 (Arbas) : Sex/Arboribus, Q(uintus) Fufius / Germanus / u(otum) s(oluit)
- CIL, XIII, 132 (Castelbiague) : Ex uoto; / Sexarbori / deo L(ucius) Domit(ius) / Censorinus / u(otum) s(oluit) l(ibens) m(erito)
- CIL, XIII, 175 (Castelbiague) : Sexs / arbori deo / T(itus) P(ompeius)/ [Clampanus / u(otum) s(oluit) l(ibens) m(erito)]

== Bibliography ==
- Girardi, Cristina; Marchesini, Simona (2021). "Le forme della pluralità divina nell'Italia preromana. Prolegomena per una tipologia". In Tolosa, María José Estarán; Dupraz, Emmanuel; Aberson, Michel (eds.). Des Mots pour les Dieux: Dédicaces Cultuelles dans les Langues Indigènes de la Méditerranée Occidentale. Peter Lang. pp. 35–60. ISBN 978-3-0343-3401-3.
- Sablayrolles, R. (1992). Les dieux des bucherons à l'époque de la domination romaine, Protoindustrie et histoire des forêts, Actes du colloque (Loubière, 10-13 octobre 1990) dans Les Cahiers de l'Isard, Toulouse. pp. 15–26
