= Robert Massenet-Royer de Marancour =

Robert Leon Henri Massenet-Royer de Marancour
- Born: 14 January 1880; Chaumont
- Died: 6 August 1969 (aged 89); Paris, France
- Military career
- Allegiance: France
- Branch: Aviation
- Rank: Chef de Bataillon (later General)
- Commands: Escadrille BLC.5; Escadrille N.69; Groupe de Combat 14
- Awards: Chevalier de la Légion d'Honneur; Officier de la Légion d'Honneur; Croix de Guerre with eight palms.

Chef de Bataillon (later General) Robert Leon Henri Massenet-Royer de Marancour was a French World War I flying ace credited with eight aerial victories.

== Biography ==
See also Aerial victory standards of World War I

Robert Leon Henri Massenet-Royer de Marancour was born on 14 January 1880 in Chaumont, France.

=== Military service ===
By 1910, Massenet-Royer de Marancour was already a professional soldier. He was appointed Sous lieutenant on 1 October of that year. His interest in flying led to him gaining a Civil Pilot's Brevet on 6 February 1914, followed by his qualification for a Military Pilot's Brevet on 23 April. On 27 May 1914, he was sent to command Escadrille BLC.5. On 2 August 1914, he was promoted to Capitaine.

Massenet-Royer de Marancour was appointed to the Legion d'honneur on 13 July 1915.

Chevalier de la Légion d'Honneur

"Has always accomplished the missions assigned to him with courage and very intelligent discernment; he is an excellent pilot as well as an observer. Because of these two qualities, on 26 September 1914, under difficult circumstances, he provided information about the presence of considerable forces to the rear of the enemy armies and continued updating on a delicate situation. He has undertaken numerous reconnaissances over the enemy." Chevalier de la Légion d'Honneur citation, 13 July 1915

On 1 October 1915, he was entrusted with the command of a fighter squadron, Escadrille N.69. While with this squadron, he shot down his first German airplane on 22 September 1916, followed by two more the next day.

On 15 March 1917, he was appointed to command Groupe de Combat 14. Consonant with his greater responsibility in commanding a larger unit, Massenet-Royer de Marancour was promoted to Chef de bataillon. He managed his fourth victory on 24 April before taking a bullet through his right foot on 3 May 1917. He would not score again until September, when he shot down two reconnaissance airplanes to become a flying ace

He suffered injuries in a take-off accident on 5 March 1918. Nevertheless, he shot down another German airplane on 12 April.

On 27 May 1918, he was advanced within the Légion d'Honneur:

Officier de la Légion d'Honneur

"Commanding a groupe de combat since April 1917, thanks to his initiative and alacrity. Intelligent, he has made his groupe a fighting unit of the first order, gaining the confidence of his personnel by his ardor and skill in combat. Has downed seven enemy planes. Five citations." Officier de la Légion d'Honneur citation, 27 May 1918

Massenet-Royer de Marancour shot down a German airplane on 1 November for his eighth and final aerial victory.

In addition to the dual awards to the Légion d'Honneur, Massenet-Royer de Marancour was awarded the Croix de Guerre with eight palms.

Robert Massenet-Royer de Marancour was appointed to command Groupe de Chasse II on 3 March 1919.

Massenet-Royer de Marancour would eventually retire at the rank of General. He died in Paris on 6 August 1969.
