= William Otway Boger =

Canadian World War I flying ace

- Born: 19 June 1895; Brandon, Manitoba, Canada
- Died: 10 August 1918 (aged 23) † near Montdidier, France
- Burial place: Arras Flying Services Memorial, Pas de Calais, France
- Military career
- Allegiance: Canada; United Kingdom (Note: Canadian airmen were required to complete an Attestation Paper in which they declared an oath of allegiance to King George V and agreed to serve in any arm of the service for the duration of the war between Great Britain and Germany.)
- Branch: Canadian Expeditionary Force; British Army; Royal Flying Corps
- Rank: Captain
- Units: Lord Strathcona's Horse (Royal Canadians); No. 11 Squadron RFC; No. 92 Squadron RAF; No. 93 Squadron RAF; No. 56 Squadron RAF
- Conflicts: World War I; Western Front
- Awards: Distinguished Flying Cross

Captain William Otway Boger DFC (19 June 1895 – 10 August 1918) was a Canadian World War I flying ace credited with five aerial victories.

== Early life and background ==
Boger was the son of Henry Western Otway Boger and his wife Sarah Elizabeth, of Winnipeg, and attended the Royal Military College of Canada at Kingston, from August 1913 to November 1914.

== Military service ==
In February 1916 Boger reported for duty at Fort Osborne, Winnipeg, where in July 1916, the first draft of reinforcements to serve in the Canadian Expeditionary Force overseas were called for. Boger volunteered, and was selected. He attested at Canterbury on 26 July 1915, and was sent to France to serve as a lieutenant in Lord Strathcona's Horse (Royal Canadians), part of the Canadian Cavalry Brigade.

Boger was seconded the Royal Flying Corps on 15 November 1916, to serve as a flying officer (observer), with seniority from 18 September 1916, in No. 11 Squadron RFC, flying in a F.E.2b.

He was wounded on 20 December 1916 and was back in England by the end of the year. After recovering he trained as a pilot, and was appointed a flying officer on 20 September 1917. He served for a time as an instructor in Scotland, before being posted to No. 92 Squadron RAF on 25 April 1918. On 10 May he was posted to No. 93 Squadron RAF, with promotion to the temporary rank of captain to serve as a flight commander.

Boger joined No. 56 Squadron RAF on 24 May. to fly the S.E.5a single-seat fighter. He scored his first victory on 13 June, driving a Fokker Dr.I down out on control over Le Sars. His second come on 30 June, destroying an LVG two-seater east of Legast Wood. On 24 July he accounted for two Pfalz D.III fighters in 20 minutes, and gained his fifth and final victory on 8 August, driving down a Fokker D.VII north-east of Chaulnes.

On 10 August 1918 Boger was leading a patrol of three aircraft over Montdidier when they observed a lone enemy two-seater about 2,000 to 3,000 feet below. Only when Boger led his aircraft down to attack did he realize that it was a decoy for a swarm of Fokker aircraft above him. In the ensuing dogfight Boger and H. Allen, an American, were shot down. Initially listed as missing, he was later confirmed to have been killed in action. German ace Josef Veltjens claimed a kill on a S.E.5a that same day, and is usually considered the victor over Boger.

As a Commonwealth airman with no known grave Boger is commemorated on the Arras Flying Services Memorial at Arras, Pas de Calais, France, and also on Page 370 of the First World War Book of Remembrance.

Boger's award of the Distinguished Flying Cross was gazetted posthumously on 2 November 1918. His citation read:

Lieutenant (Temporary Captain) William Otway Boger (Strathcona's Horse).

"This officer has taken part in twenty-eight offensive patrols and twelve combats, accounting for four enemy aeroplanes—two destroyed in flames and two driven down out of control. As a leader he shows marked coolness and bravery, notably on a recent patrol when, as he was leading his four machines, he saw nine Pfalz scouts. Unable to rise to their height he led his patrol just beneath them in order to tempt them to attack. As the enemy did not respond he repeated the manoeuvre; the scouts then came down, and in the engagement one was shot down out of control. Reforming his patrol he met two more scouts, one of which, he destroyed in flames."

=== List of aerial victories ===
Combat record
No.	Date/Time	Aircraft/ Serial No.	Opponent	Result	Location
1	13 June 1918 @ 1115	S.E.5a (C9567)	Fokker Dr.I	Out of control	Le Sars
2	30 June 1918 @ 1045	S.E.5a (C9567)	LVG C	Destroyed	East of Legast Wood
3	24 July 1918 @ 2020–2050	S.E.5a (D6096)	Pfalz D.III	Out of control	Méricourt
4	24 July 1918 @ 2020–2050	S.E.5a (D6096)	Pfalz D.III	Destroyed in flames	Cappy
5	8 August 1918 @ 1905	S.E.5a (D6096)	Fokker D.VII	Out of control	North-east of Chaulnes
