= Frank Douglas Stevens =

British First World War flying ace

- Born: 7 April 1893; Kingston upon Thames, Surrey, England
- Died: 31 March 1977 (aged 83); Delgany, County Wicklow, Ireland
- Military career
- Allegiance: United Kingdom
- Branch: British Army; Royal Air Force
- Service years: 1914–1919
- Rank: Captain
- Nickname: "Inky"
- Units: Suffolk Regiment; Motor Machine Gun Service; Royal Flying Corps
- Conflicts: World War I • Western Front
- Awards: Order of the British Empire
- Other work: Brewing engineer, Guinness Brewery, Dublin

Captain Frank Douglas Stevens OBE (7 April 1893 – 31 March 1977) was a British First World War flying ace credited with five aerial victories.

== Military service ==
Stevens was commissioned as a temporary second lieutenant in the infantry on 22 September 1914. He served briefly in the 9th (Service) Battalion, Suffolk Regiment, before being seconded for service with the Motor Machine Gun Service on 21 November 1914, and was later transferred to the General List. He was promoted to lieutenant on 1 March 1915.

Stevens joined the Royal Flying Corps to serve as a gunner/observer, being appointed a flying officer (observer) on 21 June 1916, but soon trained a pilot, and was appointed a flying officer on 21 November 1916. He was posted to No. 20 Squadron RFC, to fly the F.E.2d two-seater fighter, where he gained his first victory on 3 May 1917 by driving down "out of control" an Albatros D.III. On 9 June 1917 he was appointed a flight commander, with the acting rank of captain, and gained his remaining four victories, all D.IIIs driven down, between 17 May and 16 August 1917. His observer/gunners included fellow ace Lieutenant William Cambray.

On 1 April 1918, the Army's Royal Flying Corps and the Royal Naval Air Service were merged to form the Royal Air Force, and Stevens was appointed a captain in the new service that day. On 21 July 1918 he was appointed an acting-major.

=== List of aerial victories ===
Combat record
No.	Date/Time	Aircraft/ Serial No.	Opponent	Result	Location
1	3 May 1917 @ 1715	F.E.2d (A6444)	Albatros D.III	Out of control	Westrozebeke
2	3 July 1917 @ 1600	F.E.2d (A6516)	Albatros D.III	Out of control	Becelaere
3	6 July 1917 @ 1830	F.E.2d (A6516)	Albatros D.III	Out of control	Comines
4	17 July 1917 @ 1955	F.E.2d (A6516)	Albatros D.III	Out of control	Polygon Wood
5	16 August 1917 @ 1100	F.E.2d (A6516)	Albatros D.III	Out of control	South-east of Polygon Wood

== Post-war career ==
After the end of the war, on 21 March 1919, Stevens was transferred to the RAF unemployed list, and on 3 June, in the King's Birthday Honours, he was made an Officer of the Order of the British Empire "in recognition of distinguished services rendered during the War".

On 7 July 1921 he married Eva May, youngest daughter of William Gore of Sandymount, Dublin, at Sandymount Presbyterian Church.

== Bibliography ==
- Shores, Christopher F.; Franks, Norman & Guest, Russell F. (1990). Above the Trenches: a Complete Record of the Fighter Aces and Units of the British Empire Air Forces 1915–1920. London, UK: Grub Street. ISBN 978-0-948817-19-9.
