= Homos =

Homos may refer to:

- Hummus, a Middle Eastern chickpea puree dish
- Homo (slang) (plural), a homophobic slur against gay men
- Homos (footballer) (born 1979), Egyptian footballer

== See also ==
- Homo (disambiguation)
