= Homo (surname) =

Homo occurs as a surname. Notable people with the surname include:

- Amandine Homo (born 1980), French athlete
- Léon Homo (1872–1957), French historian
- Paul Homo (1892–1968), French military aviator
- Sandra-Hélèna Homo (born 1982), Portuguese pole vaulter
- Sébastien Homo (born 1982), French athlete
