= Charles Pickthorn =

British World War I flying ace

Charles Edward Murray Pickthorn
- Born: 20 September 1896; Ilford, Essex, England
- Died: 3 March 1938 (aged 41); Orford, Suffolk, England
- Relatives: Kenneth Pickthorn (brother)
- Military career
- Allegiance: United Kingdom
- Branch: British Army; Royal Air Force
- Service years: 1915–1920
- Rank: Major
- Units: No. 8 Squadron RFC; No. 32 Squadron RFC
- Commands: No. 84 Squadron RAF
- Conflicts: World War I • Western Front
- Awards: Military Cross; Medal of Merit, 2nd class (Chile)

Major Charles Edward Murray Pickthorn MC (20 September 1896 – 3 March 1938) was a British World War I flying ace credited with five aerial victories. His fourth victory resulted in the death of Prince Friedrich Karl of Prussia.

== Family background ==
Pickthorn was born in Ilford, Essex, the second son of Charles Wright Pickthorn and Edith Maud Berkeley Murray. He was educated at Aldenham School, Hertfordshire. His older brother was Sir Kenneth William Murray Pickthorn, Bt, PC, MP, .

== World War I ==
Pickthorn was commissioned as a second lieutenant (on probation) in the Army Service Corps on 8 February 1915, and was confirmed in his rank on 20 March 1916.

He was seconded to the Royal Flying Corps with the temporary rank of lieutenant on 1 June 1916, and appointed a flying officer (observer) on 25 June. He was posted to No. 8 Squadron to serve as an observer/gunner in the B.E.2c two-seater reconnaissance aircraft and light bomber. On 29 June his pilot, Lieutenant Vaisey, was badly wounded in combat and lost consciousness; Pickthorn managed to fly them back to base while also sending a message in morse requesting medical aid be ready when they landed. On 13 November he received a mention in despatches for his "distinguished and gallant services and devotion to duty" from Sir Douglas Haig, Commander-in-Chief of the British Armies in France.

Pickthorn then trained as a pilot, being appointed a flying officer on 31 October 1916, and was posted to No. 32 Squadron to fly the DH.2 single-seat fighter. His first aerial victory came on 27 January 1917 when he shared in the destruction of a Type C reconnaissance aircraft between Courcelles and Achiet with Captain James Robb, Lieutenants Frank Billinge, T. A. Gooch, C. G. Eccles, and Second Lieutenant H. D. Davies. On 26 February he drove down out of control a Type D aircraft over Bucquoy, and on 6 March he destroyed an Albatros D.I east of Bapaume, also being wounded.

On 21 March 1917 Pickthorn was appointed a flight commander with the temporary rank of captain. The same day he forced down an Albatros D.I bearing skull and crossbones insignia behind the British lines at Lagnicourt. The pilot attempted to evade capture, but was shot and wounded by Australian troops. He turned out to be Prince Friedrich Karl of Prussia, who died from his wounds two weeks later.

Pickthorn was awarded the Military Cross which was gazetted on 26 April 1917. His citation read:

Second Lieutenant (Temporary Lieutenant) Charles Edward Murray Pickthorn, Army Service Corps, Special Reserve, and Royal Flying Corps.

"For conspicuous gallantry and devotion to duty in attacking hostile aircraft, and in carrying out difficult reconnaissances. On one occasion, although wounded, he continued his combat and brought down a hostile machine. On two other occasions he brought down hostile machines in flames."

Pickthorn received a regimental promotion to lieutenant in the Army Service Corps on 1 July 1917, and on 8 January 1918 he received a special appointment as a flight commander, though graded as a squadron commander, with the temporary rank of major. He was again appointed a temporary major on 30 April 1918.

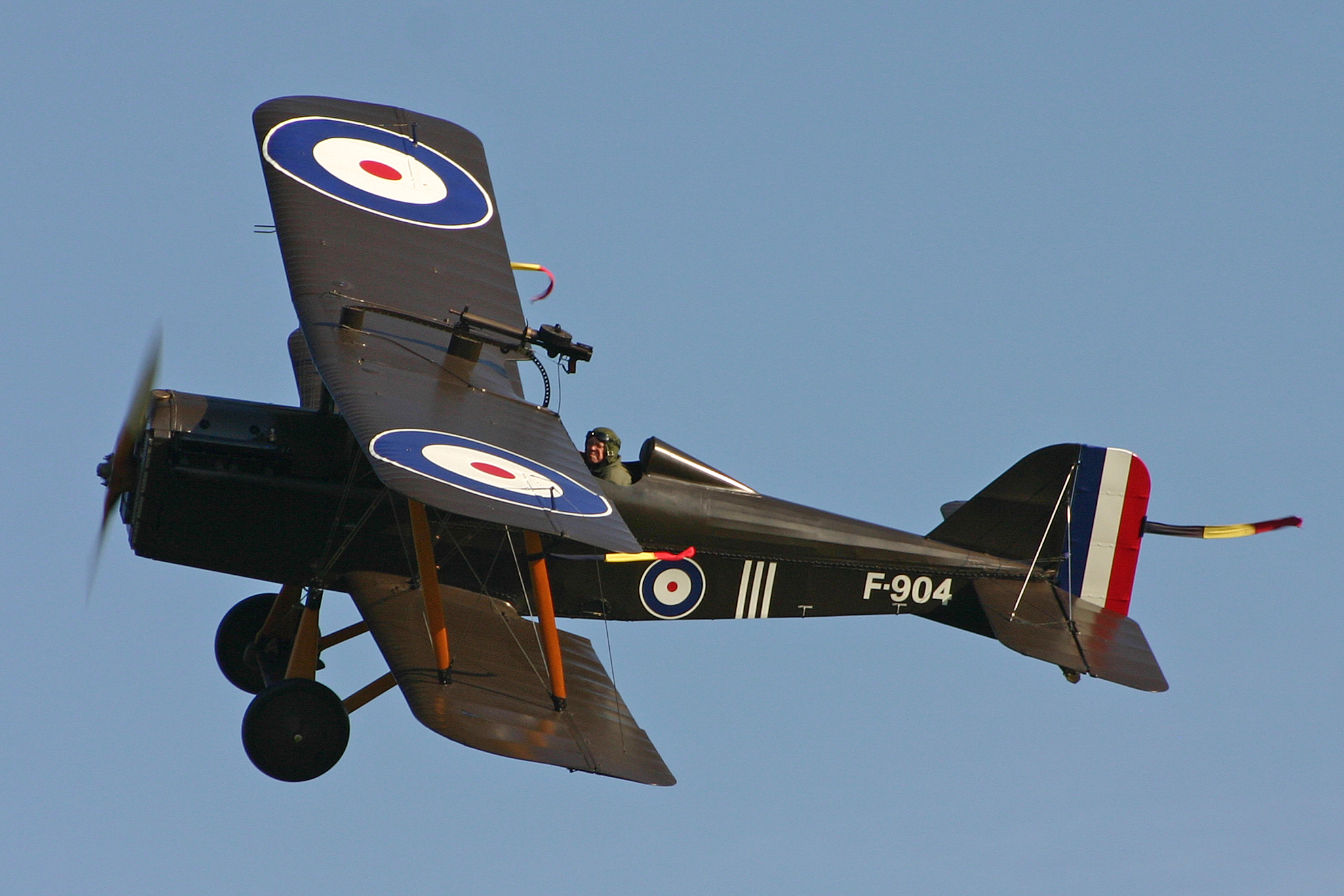
Pickthorn's aircraft F904 in flight in 2011.

On 8 November 1918, Pickthorn took command of No. 84 Squadron. Two days later, flying a Royal Aircraft Factory SE.5a, serial number F904, he destroyed a Fokker D.VII east of Mutagne. The following day, 11 November, the armistice came into effect, ending the fighting. Pickthorn's S.E.5a eventually became part of the Shuttleworth Collection based at Old Warden Aerodrome, Bedfordshire, where it remains in flyable condition.

== Post-war career ==
Pickthorn continued to command No. 84 Squadron as part of the British Forces of Occupation in Germany until 5 April 1919, and on 1 May 1919 he was transferred to the RAF's unemployed list.

On 12 December 1919 Pickthorn was granted a short service commission in the RAF with the rank of flight lieutenant, but this was cancelled on 6 January 1920. He finally relinquished his commission in the Army Service Corps on 1 April 1920.

From October 1920 Pickthorn was in Chile, serving as one of the flying instructors under Major Frank Pilkington Scott contracted to instruct fliers of the Servicio de Aviación Militar en Chile ("Chilean Military Aviation Service") at the Escuela de Aviación Militar ("Military Aviation School"), eventually returning to England in 1921. He was subsequently awarded the Chilean Medal of Merit (2nd class) in 1925.

Pickthorn was commissioned as flying officer on probation (Class A) in the Reserve of Air Force Officers on 23 March 1926, and was confirmed in his rank on 23 September. On 31 July 1928 he was promoted to flight lieutenant, before finally relinquishing his commission on the completion of his period of service on 23 March 1934, and was permitted to retain the rank of squadron leader.

In early June 1928 Pickthorn was elected a member of the Royal Aero Club, and also received Aviators' Certificate No. 8276. At the end of the month, during the ninth annual Royal Air Force Display, Pickthorn took part in a race between instructors from the Reserve of Air Force Officers training centres, representing the North Sea Aerial & General Transport Company Ltd., based in Leeds. Flying Avro 504N aircraft over a 14-mile (23 km) course the five competitors all finished with eight seconds of each other, with Pickthorn just in front.

In November 1928, Pickthorn was one of the founders of the Brooklands School of Flying alongside Captain H. D. Davis, which was formed following the retirement of Lieutenant-Colonel G. L. P. Henderson from the Henderson Flying School. Davis, Henderson's former Chief Instructor took over the business and renamed it. Pickthorn served as a flying instructor at Brooklands, and represented the school in the 1930 King's Cup race, flying the streamlined Gipsy Moth G-AAWR. With Captain Jones as his navigator, he flew at an average speed of 106.2 miles per hour (170.9 km/h), and come in 22nd place.

On 5 August 1932 a partnership between Pickthorn and John Hastings Bartlett, as Aeroplane & Motor Engineers & Dealers and Garage Proprietors in London, was dissolved by mutual consent.

Pickthorn died in March 1938.

== Personal life ==
Pickthorn first married Bessie Dorothy Batten Bell, elder daughter of the late William Bell, of Belfast, and Mrs. Batten Bell, Wimbledon, on 28 April 1917 at St Mary's Church, Wimbledon. On 2 March 1932 he married Hilda Pyper, daughter of George Pyper, and they had a daughter Catherine, born in 1936.
