= Fernand Bonneton =

French flying ace

- Born: 10 May 1890; La Coucourde, Drôme department, France
- Died: 24 June 1922 (aged 32); Brussels, Belgium
- Military career
- Allegiance: France
- Branch: Cavalry; infantry; aviation
- Rank: Commandant
- Units: 82e Regiment d'Infanterie, Escadrille 69
- Commands: 1e Fighter Groupe
- Awards: Legion d'honneur, Croix de Guerre, Mentioned in Dispatches six times, plus five foreign decorations

Commandant Fernand Bonneton was a French World War I flying ace credited with nine confirmed aerial victories. He would survive the war, only to die in an aviation accident on 24 June 1922.

== Early life ==
Fernand Bonneton was born in La Coucourde, north of Montelimar, on 10 May 1890.

== World War I ==
In the beginning of World War I, Bonneton served in the cavalry until he was wounded twice. After a voluntary transfer to the infantry, he was wounded twice more and invalided out of ground service in May 1916. He then volunteered for transfer to aviation duty. After training at Juvisy, he was stationed on the Eastern Front; in Spring 1917, he was in Romania. He was credited with his first aerial victory there on 8 August; there may have been a second, but details are not available. At any rate, he earned two Mentions in Dispatches and five foreign decorations before moving south to Italy, where he scored again on 30 October 1917.

In May 1918, he was moved back to France to join Escadrille Spa69 (the 'Spa' denoting the squadron's use of Spads). On 10 July 1918, Bonneton shot down his third enemy airplane. He then began a career as a balloon buster, running off a string of five wins over them, along with another win over an enemy plane, by 22 October 1918.

== Postwar ==
Bonneton commanded a squadron in Poland at war's end. Then he became Commandant of 1e Fighter Groupe. While serving in this capacity, he died in a flying accident at Brussels on 24 June 1922.
