= William Cambray =

British WWI flying ace

William Charles Cambray
- Born: 12 November 1894; Camberwell, London, England
- Died: 1978 (aged 83–84); Queensland, Australia
- Military career
- Allegiance: United Kingdom
- Branch: British Army; Royal Air Force
- Rank: Lieutenant
- Unit: No. 20 Squadron RFC
- Awards: Military Cross

Lieutenant William Charles Cambray MC (12 November 1894 – 1978) was a World War I flying ace credited with six aerial victories won while flying as an observer/gunner in two-seater aircraft.

== Early life and ground service ==
William Charles Cambray was from Herne Hill, London. From 1912 to 1914, he worked in insurance. He first served with the London Regiment, and went into action with them in France at the beginning of World War I.

== Aerial service during World War I ==
Cambray transferred into the Royal Flying Corps in 1916. He qualified as an observer on 13 June with seniority reckoned from 26 March. He flew in 20 Squadron's Royal Aircraft Factory FE.2d pusher two-seater airplanes in the first part of 1917. Cambray scored his first aerial victory on 31 May 1917 when piloted by Donald Cunnell; they destroyed an Albatros D.III northwest of Seclin. He went on to destroy three more Albatroses, and drive two down out of control by 21 September 1917. He was piloted by other aces such as Frank Stevens and Harry G. E. Luchford. His final win was from the back seat of a Bristol F.2 Fighter.

He had been promoted to Lieutenant in the London Regiment, effective 1 July 1917, and remained seconded to the RFC. He also earned a Military Cross, which was gazetted to him on 17 September 1917. He was returned to Home Establishment on 9 October 1917. He would not return to combat. He left the Royal Air Force on 22 April 1919.

== Post World War I ==
Cambray surrendered his commission in the 2nd Battalion, London Regiment on 30 September 1921. On 3 November 1922, Cambray took a leasehold on 78 Fawnbrake Avenue, London; his occupation was given as clerk.

Cambray returned to duty during World War II; he was commissioned a second lieutenant in the infantry on 30 January 1944. On 5 November 1945, he was placed on the unemployed list with the honorary rank of Lieutenant.

On 9 November 1956, Cambray was Chairman of H. F. G. Ross and Son (Builders) Ltd when it liquidated.

== Honors and awards ==
Military Cross

2nd Lt. William Charles Cambray, R.F.C.

Awarded for gallantry and devotion to duty as observer on offensive patrols. He confirmed four enemy aircraft destroyed and participated in numerous aerial engagements.
