= Sydney Dalrymple =

Australian fighter pilot

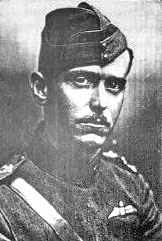
- Born: 11 May 1885; Ballarat, Colony of Victoria
- Died: 12 July 1969 (aged 84); Toorak, Victoria, Australia
- Spouse: Nancy Moule (m. 1921)
- Military career
- Allegiance: United Kingdom
- Branch: Royal Flying Corps; Royal Air Force
- Service years: 1915–1919
- Rank: Captain
- Units: No. 27 Squadron RFC; No. 24 Squadron RFC; No. 139 Squadron RAF
- Conflicts: World War I; Western Front; Italian Front
- Awards: Distinguished Flying Cross

Captain Sydney Dalrymple DFC (11 May 1885 – 12 July 1969), was an Australian First World War flying ace, credited with five aerial victories while serving in the British Royal Flying Corps and Royal Air Force.

== Background and early life ==
Dalrymple was born in Ballarat, Colony of Victoria, one of three children, and the younger son, of William Dalrymple, and his wife Alice Kate (née Hodgson) of Geelong. His grandfather, Alexander Dalrymple, owned Lexington Station, near Ararat, and his father became a prominent pastoralist in Queensland, owning Portland Downs on the Barcoo in partnership with his step-father W. D. Clarke, and later Llanrheidol Station, near Winton, which he eventually sold in March 1918 for £120,000 — equivalent to £12,145,000 today. Dalrymple's mother was a granddaughter of Dr. James Ross, of Edinburgh, who had travelled to Tasmania with Governor Arthur, where he farmed and also wrote a well-regarded history of the colony. Dalrymple grew up in the family residence "Stranraer", a large 23-room mansion, standing in three acres (1.2 ha) of grounds in the prestigious suburb of Toorak. He played Australian rules football with Melbourne in the Victorian Football League (VFL)in 1902.

== World War I ==
In June 1915 Dalrymple left Australia, sailing for England aboard the liner RMS Medina to join the Royal Flying Corps. He learned to fly at the London and Provincial School at Hendon, and on 4 October 1915 was granted Royal Aero Club Aviators' Certificate No. 1815 after soloing the L & P biplane.

Dalrymple was commissioned as a second lieutenant (on probation) in the RFC on 11 October 1915, appointed a flying officer on 21 December, and confirmed in his rank on 8 January 1916. On 22 May he was posted to No. 27 Squadron in France to fly the Martinsyde G.100 "Elephant" single-seat day bomber, and on 12 June was appointed a flight commander with the temporary rank of captain. He gained his first aerial victory on the morning of 1 July, destroying a Roland two-seater near Cambrai. He was soon after transferred to No. 24 Squadron, and was promoted to lieutenant on 1 July 1917. In mid-1918 Dalrymple was transferred again, to No. 139 Squadron in Italy to fly the Bristol F.2b two-seater fighter.Despite being assigned to reconnaissance patrols, he found himself engaged in dogfights, where he downed four additional enemy aircraft, securing double victories on both August 8 and September 13.

On 1 November 1918 he was awarded the Distinguished Flying Cross. His citation read:

Captain Sydney Dalrymple.

"A gallant and skilful leader who has been instrumental in destroying at least five enemy machines. He has carried out many reconnaissances under very difficult circumstances and brought back most valuable information, including photographs of the enemy's position."

Dalrymple remained in Italy with No. 139 Squadron after the armistice, taking the Prince of Wales on a flight over the front lines in March 1919. He was eventually transferred to the RAF's unemployed list on 9 April 1919.

=== List of aerial victories ===
Combat record
No.	Date/Time	Aircraft/ Serial No.	Opponent	Result	Location	Notes
No. 27 Squadron RFC
1	1 July 1916 @ 0930–1130	Martinsyde G.100	Roland C	Destroyed	Near Cambrai	
No. 139 Squadron RAF
2	8 August 1918	Bristol Fighter (D8084)	Berg D.I	Destroyed	Levico	Observer: Lieutenant H. Baldwin
3	8 August 1918	Bristol Fighter (D8084)	Berg D.I	Destroyed in flames	Caldonazzo	Observer: Lieutenant H. Baldwin
4	13 September 1918	Bristol Fighter (D8081)	Albatros D.III	Destroyed in flames	Trento	Observer: Lieutenant G. Beagle
5	13 September 1918	Bristol Fighter (D8081)	Albatros D.III	Destroyed in flames	Trento	Observer: Lieutenant G. Beagle

== Post-war life ==
Dalrymple sailed back to Australia, arriving in Adelaide in late September 1919. In March 1920 he bought a 3,000-acre (1,200 ha) estate at Point Cook from the Chirnside family, who had owned it since 1837. The estate contained a notable homestead, stabling, a reservoir, and over five miles of sea frontage around Port Phillip.

In February 1921 he became engaged to Nancy Moule, also from Toorak, and they were married at St. John's Church, Toorak, on 18 October, in front of about 300 guests. After honeymooning in Sydney, they returned to Point Cook.

In 1924 Dalrymple sold the northern section of his estate to the Cheetham Salt Company for the construction of salt lagoons, and in April 1925 the Dalrymples left Point Cook to live in a house in South Yarra. They eventually sold the entire property in 1939.

Dalrymple's father had died in November 1923, and his mother in February 1931, leaving him in possession of the family home. In October 1935 it was sold for £16,000 to a syndicate, the land to be divided into 12 building plots and auctioned off. Before being demolished much of the mansion was sold off piece-meal at auction, the Dalrymples raising another £750 for the hot water system, panelling, staircase, landing gallery and roof timbers.

While his wife was a staple of the Melbourne social scene, Dalrymple concerned himself with "golf, making and designing golf clubs, driving high-powered cars, flying and stunting aircraft, sketching and caricaturing other golfers, and arguing golf and golfers." On 7 August 1927 he crashed his de Havilland Moth light aircraft into the concrete wall of an empty reservoir near the North Essendon Aerodrome, completely wrecking it, although he and his passenger escaped with only minor injuries.

He and his wife also had three children, Sheila, and twins June and John, who became a pilot for Australian National Airways. By 1946 the Dalrymples were living in Sandringham.
