= John Womersley =

John Herbert Greenwood Womersley
- Born: 1 April 1896; Halifax, Yorkshire, England
- Died: 23 January 1962 (aged 65); Hastings, Sussex, England
- Military career
- Allegiance: United Kingdom
- Branch: British Army; Royal Air Force
- Service years: 1915–1919; 1940–1945
- Rank: Lieutenant
- Units: Royal Garrison Artillery; No. 43 Squadron RFC; Pioneer Corps
- Conflicts: World War I • Western Front; World War II
- Awards: Military Cross

Lieutenant John Herbert Greenwood Womersley MC (1 April 1896 – 23 January 1962) was a World War I flying ace credited with five aerial victories.

== World War I ==
Womersley trained as a cadet in the Leeds University Officers' Training Corps, and was commissioned as a second lieutenant in the East Riding Fortress Company, Royal Garrison Artillery (Territorial Force) (Note: As part of the North Eastern Coastal Defences, it consisted of a Headquarters, No. 1 Works Company, and No. 2 Electric Light (i.e. searchlight) Company, based at Hull.) on 27 October 1915. On 7 July 1916 he was one of a number of junior officers seconded for duty with the Regular Royal Garrison Artillery.

Womersley later transferred to the Royal Flying Corps, being appointed a flying officer on 1 April 1917, and was assigned to No. 43 Squadron to fly the Sopwith 1½ Strutter two-seater fighter. On 16 June, he was part of a multi-aircraft assault on an Albatros D.III; he shared credit for the victory with his observer Air Mechanic 2nd Class J. M. O'Shea and ten squadron-mates. On 1 July 1917 he was promoted to lieutenant. Womersley gained a second victory on 23 July, driving down an Albatros D.V with his observer Second Lieutenant Cyril Agelasto. His squadron was then re-equipped with the single-seater Sopwith Camel; in which he gained two more victories on 24 October. His fifth and final victory came on 12 November 1917. That same day, he crashed during a practice flight and was severely injured.

He was awarded the Military Cross on 18 January 1918. His citation read:

Lieutenant John Herbert Greenwood Womersley, Royal Garrison Artillery and Royal Flying Corps.

"For conspicuous gallantry and devotion to duty in aerial fighting. He brought down four enemy machines and forced others to land. He also carried out reconnaissances at a low altitude."

Womersley was transferred to the RAF unemployed list on 16 April 1919.

=== List of aerial victories ===
Combat record
No.	Date/Time	Aircraft/ Serial No.	Opponent	Result	Location	Notes
1	16 July 1917 @ 0830	Sopwith 1½ Strutter (A8244)	Albatros D.III	Destroyed	North of Lens	Observer: AM2 J. M. O'Shea. Shared with other members of No. 43 Squadron.
2	23 July 1917 @ 1745	Sopwith 1½ Strutter (A8247)	Albatros D.V	Out of control	North-east of Lens	Observer: Second Lieutenant Cyril Agelasto.
3	24 October 1917 @ 0800	Sopwith Camel (B6365)	DFW C	Destroyed	North of Loison-sous-Lens	
4	24 October 1917 @ 1100	Sopwith Camel (B6365)	DFW C	Out of control	Haubourdin	
5	12 November 1917 @ 1215	Sopwith Camel (B2437)	Albatros D.V	Out of control	East of Annay	

== Inter-war career ==
Womersley returned to the East Riding Fortress Company, Royal Garrison Artillery, on 18 November 1920, transferring to the Territorial Army Reserve on 24 June 1922.

== World War II ==
Womersley returned to military service on 21 February 1940 when he was transferred from the Territorial Army Reserve of Officers to the Auxiliary Military Pioneer Corps. He served with the British Expeditionary Force up until the battle of France, receiving a mention in despatches "in recognition of distinguished services in connection with operations in the field March–June 1940" in December 1940. Womersley served in the Pioneer Corps throughout the war, but his career ended in disgrace when he was cashiered by sentence of a Field General Court Martial on 29 May 1945.
