= Escadrille Spa.69 =

- Active: 1915–1918
- Country: France
- Branch: French Air Service
- Type: Fighter Squadron
- Battle honours: Twice Mentioned in dispatches; Fourragere of the Croix de Guerre

Escadrille Spa.69 (originally named Escadrille N.69) was a French fighter squadron derived from one of its military's oldest aviation units. Active from September 1915 until the 11 November 1918 Armistice, the escadrille campaigned on both the Western and Italian Fronts with X Armee. It was credited with 38 aerial combat victories.

== History ==
Escadrille Spa.69 had its origins in one of France's oldest military aviation units; BL C5 was an observation unit flying Bleriots that was attached to the cavalry. Personnel were drawn from BL C5 in September 1915 to form Escadrille N. 69, which was equipped with Nieuport fighters.

The squadron was posted to X Armee. On 28 February 1916, the escadrille moved to the Battle of Verdun. They returned to X Armee in July.

When the squadron had notched 20 aerial victories, it was Mentioned in dispatches. On 28 October 1917, the squadron accompanied X Armee to the Italian theater of operations. While in Italy, the squadron was re-equipped with SPAD fighters, changing its name to Escadrille Spa.69.

The newly outfitted squadron accompanied X Armee in its return to the Western Front, transferring on 26 March 1918. On 30 September 1918, Escadrille Spa.69 was Mentioned in dispatches a second time, credited with destruction of 34 enemy aircraft. This second citation gave the unit the right to display the Fourragere of the Croix de Guerre.

By the Armistice, Escadrille Spa.69 was credited with destroying 38 enemy aircraft.

== Commanding officers ==
- Capitaine Robert Massenet-Royer de Marancour: Until 25 January 1917.
- Lieutenant Paul Malavialle: 25 January 1917 until war's end.

== Notable members ==
- Major Fernand Bonneton
- Capitaine Paul Malavialle
- Lieutenant Honoré de Bonald
- Sergeant Paul Rodde

== Aircraft ==
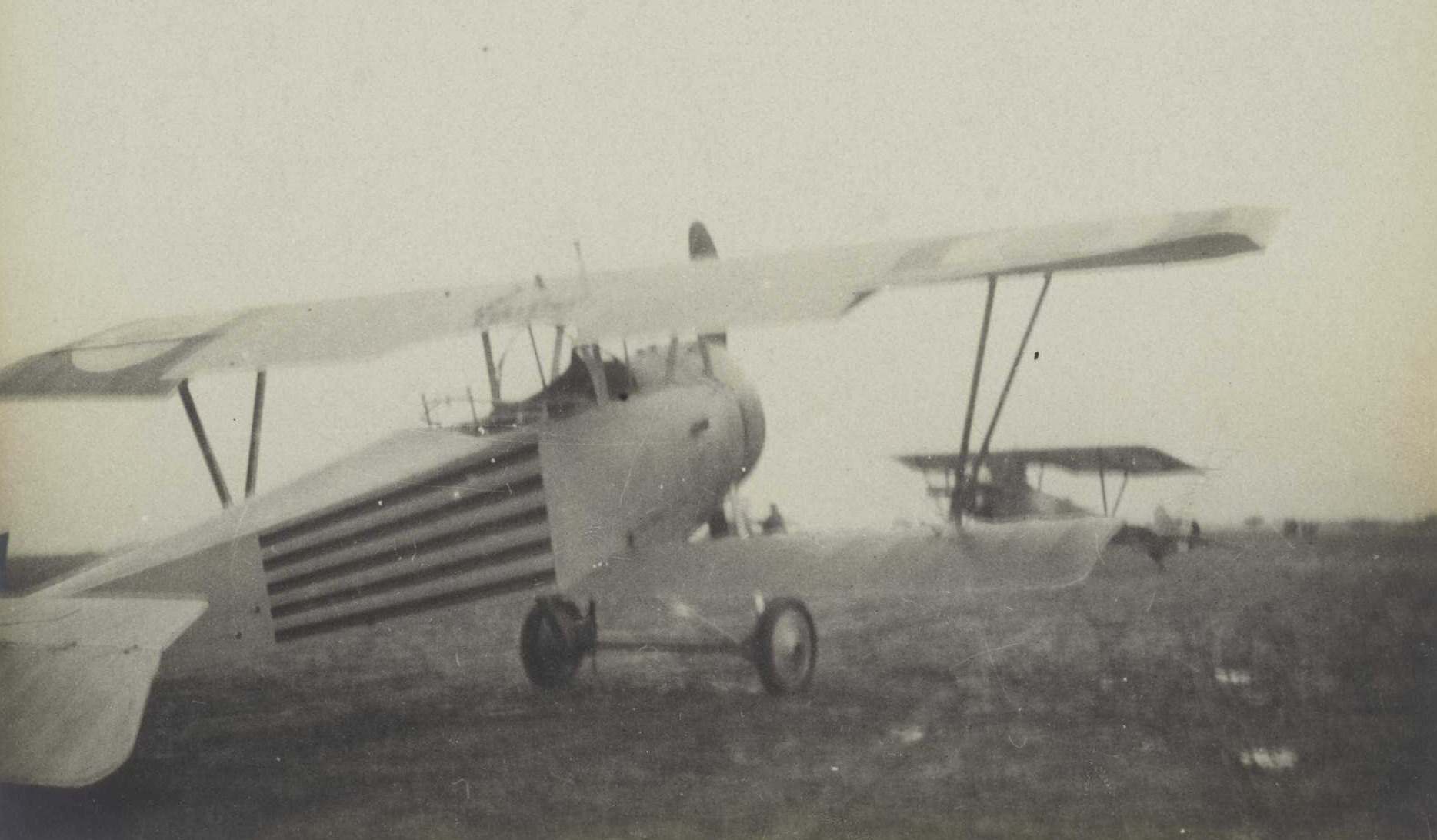
French Nieuport 12 of Escadrille N.69 at the Somme.

- Blériot observation aircraft while still BL C5
- Nieuport fighters: September 1915
- SPAD fighters: c. November 1917 until war's end
