= Frederick J. Gibbs =

British flying ace (1894–1979)

Frederick John Gibbs
- Born: 8 September 1894; Walsall, Staffordshire, England
- Died: 1979 (aged 84–85); Skelmersdale, Lancashire, England
- Military career
- Allegiance: United Kingdom
- Branch: British Army; Royal Air Force
- Service years: 1914–1918
- Rank: Captain
- Units: No. 23 Squadron RFC; No. 64 Squadron RAF
- Awards: Military Cross

Captain Frederick John Gibbs MC (8 September 1894 – 1979) was a British World War I flying ace credited with 11 official victories. Post-war, he went into teaching.

== World War I ==
Frederick John Gibbs was an old boy of Queen Mary's Grammar School, Walsall and a member of the Officers' Training Corps. When the First World War broke out he was a student at Saltley Teacher Training College and was mobilised with the Royal Warwickshire Regiment. In June 1915 he was granted a commission in the South Staffordshire Regiment and in April 1916 he went to Egypt where he served in the desert before El Arish, attached to the Royal Welsh Fusiliers. He then trained in Egypt and secured his pilot's certificate. On 29 November 1916, temporary second lieutenant F. J. Gibbs of the South Staffordshire Regiment was appointed a flying officer in the Royal Flying Corps.

By mid-1917, he had been trained as a SPAD pilot and was posted with No. 23 Squadron in France. On 2 June 1917, he opened his victory roll when he drove down a German Albatros D.III fighter out of control. Later that month, on the 17th, he destroyed a DFW two-seater reconnaissance plane. On 27 July 1917, he scored twice, driving down an Albatros D.V fighter on one patrol and sharing in the destruction of an Aviatik recon plane with Roger Neville on another. The destruction of another DFW on 13 August made him an ace.

On 18 August 1917, he scored again, driving down an Albatros D.V. Four days after that, he destroyed a DFW over Wervicq, Belgium. On 25 August, he drove down an Albatros D.V over Langemarck. A month would pass before his next win; on 25 September, he set a German two-seater recon plane afire in the sky north of Wervicq.

On 26 September 1917, Frederick John Gibbs of the South Staffordshires and RFC was awarded the Military Cross for his valor. It would not be gazetted until 9 January 1918; the text of the accompanying award citation read:

"For conspicuous gallantry and devotion to duty in attacking enemy aircraft and engaging hostile troops from the ground. He has in all driven down five enemy machines which were destroyed, and one other completely out of control. He has also attacked and silenced a hostile battery with machinegun fire, displaying on every occasion the same dash and determined offensive spirit."

Gibbs would score once more while with 23 Squadron, destroying a Rumpler on 2 October 1917 for his tenth victory.

By February 1918, Gibbs had been promoted to captain.

After a year's lapse, Gibbs scored one final victory while flying a Royal Aircraft Factory SE.5a for 64 Squadron. On 29 October 1918, he destroyed an LVG reconnaissance craft over Estreux, France.

== After the War ==
After the War, Frederick Gibbs gained the teacher training certification that the war had interrupted. He became a headteacher from 1928 -1932 at Werrington Council School, Launceston, Cornwall. From 1932 – 1936 he was headteacher at the Priory Boys School, Great Yarmouth and from 1936 -1940 headteacher at Eccleshall Senior School, Staffordshire.

Gibbs ended his teaching career at Cheadle Secondary School, Staffordshire before retiring to Bridgnorth, Shropshire, in 1959. After he was widowed he moved to Skelmersdale, Lancashire, where he died in 1979.
