= Albert Mezergues =

Albert Edmond Mezergues
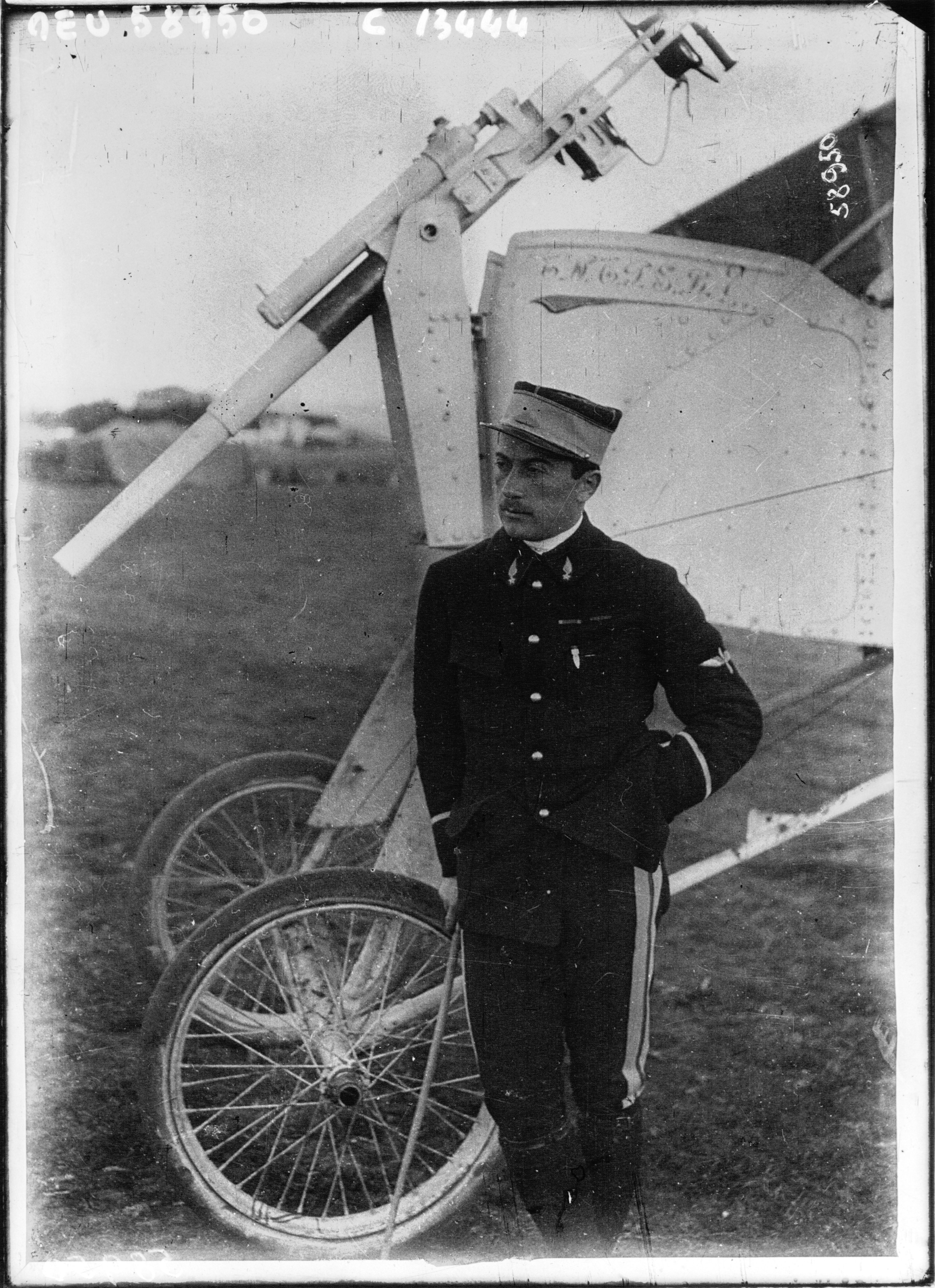
- Born: 5 November 1886; Saint-Chaptes, France
- Died: 15 May 1925 (aged 38); Spanish Morocco
- Military career
- Allegiance: France
- Branch: Hussars; aviation
- Service years: 1904 - 1925
- Rank: Capitaine
- Units: Escadrille ESC.21; Escadrille N.79; Escadrille Sop129
- Commands: Escadrille BR.131
- Awards: Legion d'Honneur; Médaille Militaire; Croix de Guerre; Romanian Order of the Crown

Albert Edmond Mezergues was a French professional soldier who became a flying ace during World War I by scoring six aerial victories. Highly decorated during the war, he continued in military service postwar until his death in 1925.

== Biography ==
See also Aerial victory standards of World War I

Albert Edmond Mezergues was born in Saint-Chaptes, France on 5 November 1886.

He began his military service on his 18th birthday, 5 November 1904, as a Hussar. He remained in service when his initial term of service expired. While being promoted through the enlisted ranks, he attended Service Corps Schools in 1910 and cavalry training in 1912. However his interest in aviation saw him sent for instruction as a pilot in December 1913. He graduated with his Military Pilot's Brevet on 7 August 1914.

On 1 September 1914, he received his first flying assignment, to Escadrille ESC.21. Sixteen days later, he was promoted to Adjutant. After that, on 5 May 1915, he was raised to the officer's ranks as a Sous lieutenant.

Despite not flying a fighter airplane, Mezergues scored his first two aerial victories in March 1916. On 27 June, he was promoted to Lieutenant. On 27 January 1917, he was transferred to Escadrille N.79. From there, he was shifted to Escadrille Sop.129. His tenure with this unit ended when he was shot down and captured on 22 August 1917. On 26 February 1918, Mezergues escaped from captivity. With his return to French hands, he was given command of Escadrille BR.131 on 22 May 1918.

He was badly wounded on 25 June 1918. On 14 August 1918, he was promoted to Capitaine. On 14 September 1918, he would score his fifth victory to become a flying ace; details of wins three and four have been lost to time. He would also score another victory whose details are unknown, his sixth and final one.

Albert Edmond Mezergues remained in service to his country after the First World War ended. He died on 15 May 1925 while on a mission to Spanish Morocco, which was then involved in the Rif War.

== Honors and awards ==
- Legion d'Honneur: Awarded 17 April 1916
- Médaille Militaire : Awarded 24 October 1914
- Croix de Guerre with seven palms
- Romanian Order of the Crown
