= Paul Malavialle =

Paul Louis Malavialle
- Born: 15 May 1888; Saint Jean de la Blaquere
- Died: 20 December 1919 (aged 31); Constantinople
- Military career
- Allegiance: France
- Branch: Flying service
- Rank: Capitaine
- Units: Escadrille N.57; Escadrille N.69
- Awards: Legion d'Honneur; Croix de Guerre; Italian Medal for Military Valor; British Military Medal

Capitaine Paul Louis Malavialle was a French World War I flying ace credited with five aerial victories.

== Biography ==
See also Aerial victory standards of World War I

Paul Louis Malavialle was born in Saint Jean de la Blaquere, France on 15 May 1888.

He began his required military service 31 May 1906, as a Hussar. It is not known if he was released into the reserves at the end of his mandatory stint, nor his actions in the early days of World War I, other than the award for valor of the Médaille Militaire.

Having earned Military Pilot's Brevet No. 520, he was posted to Escadrille N.69 as a Nieuport fighter pilot on 11 October 1915. On 8 March 1916, he shot down a LVG reconnaissance airplane for his first victory. On 1 April 1916, he was made a Chevalier of the Legion d'Honneur; three days later, he was promoted to Lieutenant.

After two more victories in September 1916, he was appointed to command the squadron on 25 January 1917. He scored his final two victories on 25 July and 24 October 1917, respectively. On 8 November 1917 Malavialle was promoted to Capitaine. Under his leadership, his escadrille was twice Mentioned in dispatches.

Paul Louis Malavialle survived the First World War, only to die of Spanish flu in Constantinople on 20 December 1919.

== Honors and awards ==
- Chevalier de la Légion d'Honneur

"A model of courage and devotion. Ever since the war started he has been an example of the highest military qualities. On 13 March 1916, he showed no hesitation in descending to 100 meters altitude over enemy lines to disengage a bombing aircraft from being attacked by an enemy plane. He forced the enemy plane to abandon the fight. Already cited twice in orders." Chevalier de la Legion d'Honneur citation

- Médaille Militaire
- Croix de Guerre with seven palms.
- British Military Medal
- Italian Medal for Military Valor

== Bibliography ==
- Franks, Norman; Bailey, Frank (1993). Over the Front: The Complete Record of the Fighter Aces and Units of the United States and French Air Services, 1914–1918 London, UK: Grub Street Publishing.
