= Paul Homo =

French flying ace

Paul Constant Homo
- Born: 10 April 1892; Arbas, France.
- Died: 20 April 1968 (aged 76)
- Military career
- Allegiance: France
- Branch: Flying service
- Service years: 1913 - 1954
- Rank: Capitaine (later Colonel)
- Units: Escadrille C.202; Escadrille C.225
- Commands: Escadrille BR.235
- Conflicts: Battle of Verdun
- Awards: Legion d'Honneur; Croix de Guerre with three palmes and an etoile de vermeil Medal for Military Valor (Italy)
- Other work: Service during World War II

Capitaine (later Colonel) Paul Constant Homo was a French World War I flying ace noted for his prowess as an aerial observer directing artillery fire, as well as being credited with five aerial victories. During World War II, he served as a Lieutenant colonel. In 1954, he retired at the rank of Colonel.

== Biography ==
=== Early life and First World War service ===
Paul Constant Homo was born in Arbas, France on 10 April 1892.

He began his military service just prior to the start of World War I, on 11 December 1913. He was an artilleryman, and was promoted through the enlisted ranks in the early months of the war. On 6 April 1915, he was raised into the officer's ranks when he was commissioned a Sous lieutenant.

During 1916, he began flying as an aerial observer with Escadrille C.202, directing French artillery fire on the Germans. As he was armed with a machine gun in the Caudron's rear seat to defend himself, he engaged in combats, shooting down his first German opponent on 29 July 1916.

By mid-1917, he had moved to Escadrille C.225, to continue his artillery direction duties, and to defend his aircraft against attack. On 2 May 1917, he scored a double victory. He received the Legion d'honneur on 11 June 1917. The citation for it read:

"Excellent observer for heavy artillery. Conscientious and skillful. Called upon to regulate firing of long duration on distant objectives, he has acquitted himself remarkably in delicate missions, in spite of enemy planes and guns. During the course of regulating artillery, on 2 May 1917, he was attacked by six German planes, but put them to flight after downing two, returning with his plane riddled by bullets. Three German planes downed to his account. Already cited in orders."

Shortly after that, on 6 July 1917, he was promoted to Lieutenant. On 12 August, he was shipped off to pilot training. He was breveted as a pilot on 11 October 1917. He was then posted to command Escadrille BR.235. A temporary promotion to Capitaine followed on 9 July 1918. His fifth and final aerial victory came three days later.

=== Postwar ===
Homo remained in service postwar. On 28 August 1923, he was confirmed in his rank of Capitaine.

=== World War II and beyond ===
Homo was called out of the reserves for service in World War II. He reached the rank of Lieutenant colonel on 2 September 1944. He continued in service after the war, being promoted to Colonel in 1950. He retired from military service in 1954. By that time, he had progressed to Commandeur in the Legion d'honneur.

Paul Constant Homo died on 20 April 1968.
