= Harold Molyneux =

Canadian World War I flying ace

Harold Arthur Sydney Molyneux
- Born: 14 March 1896; Toronto, Ontario, Canada
- Died: 30 January 1985 (aged 88)
- Military career
- Allegiance: George V of the British Empire
- Branch: Infantry; aviation
- Rank: Lieutenant
- Units: No. 60 Squadron RFC, No. 56 Squadron RAF
- Awards: Distinguished Flying Cross

Lieutenant Harold Arthur Sydney Molyneux was a World War I flying ace credited with five aerial victories. During World War II, he returned to service in the Royal Canadian Air Force.

Molyneux originally served with the Canadian Expeditionary Force. He suffered a head wound on 9 April 1917 during the Battle of Vimy Ridge. After recovery, he joined the Royal Flying Corps and received his pilot's certificate in October 1917. He was assigned to 56 Squadron on 4 April 1918. He flew a Royal Aircraft Factory SE.5a to five wins over German Fokker D.VIIs between 12 August and 24 September 1918; his final total was three destroyed, two driven down out of control. He was sent back to Home Establishment on 8 November, three days before the armistice.

== Honors and awards ==
Distinguished Flying Cross (DFC ) Lieut. Harold Arthur Sydney Molyneux (Canadian Forces and 56th Squadron). (FRANCE)

"During the August operations this officer rendered conspicuous good service on low-flying patrols, causing much damage and inflicting heavy casualties, showing brilliant dash and resolution. He is a bold fighter in the air, and has accounted for two enemy aeroplanes." Supplement to the London Gazette, 3 December 1918 (31046/14324)
