= Pierre Violet-Marty =

Pierre Augustin François Violet-Marty
- Born: 3 October 1894; Thuir, France
- Died: 27 December 1916 (aged 22)
- Military career
- Allegiance: France
- Branch: Artillery; aviation
- Rank: Adjutant
- Units: Escadrille 55; Escadrille 57
- Awards: Médaille militaire Croix de Guerre with five Palmes and an étoile de vermeil British Military Medal; Mentioned in Dispatches three times

Adjutant Pierre Augustin François Violet-Marty (1894-1916) was a World War I flying ace credited with five aerial victories.

== Biography ==
See also Aerial victory standards of World War I

Pierre Augustin François Violet-Marty was born in Thuir, France on 3 October 1894.

Violet-Marty joined the artillery at the beginning of the war on 7 September 1914, but soon switched to aviation as a pilot trainee on 24 December 1914. His Military Pilot's Brevet was awarded on 11 March 1915. On 4 May 1915, he was posted to Escadrille 55, which was equipped with Maurice Farman bombers. He won the Médaille militaire for valor on 17 September 1916, then requested transfer to fighters. He shifted to Nieuports with Escadrille 57 on 29 September 1916. Between 6 October and 17 December 1916, he downed three enemy airplanes; he claimed three other victories that went unconfirmed. On 27 December, he downed two more German planes and was killed in the process.

== Honors and awards ==
Médaille militaire

During his medal citation the following remarks were given about him: "Remarkable pilot, admired by both his leaders and his comrades for his courage, strength and coolness. On 6 August 1916 he put a Fokker to flight during a combat in which his plane was hit by two bullets. On 11 August he calmly carried out an artillery spotting mission amidst heavy shelling, until his observer was wounded. Then on 26 August he flew over attacking troops at low altitude in spite of the most unfavourable atmospheric circumstances. Already cited in orders three times."

Croix de Guerre with five Palmes and an étoile de vermeil

British Military Medal

Mentioned in Dispatches three times
