= Alois Rodlauer =

Austro-Hungarian World War I flying ace

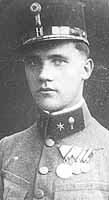
- Born: 15 July 1897; Urfahr, Upper Austria, Austro-Hungarian Empire
- Died: 26 April 1975 (aged 77); Linz, Upper Austria, Austria
- Military career
- Allegiance: Austro-Hungarian Empire; Nazi Germany
- Branch: Austro-Hungarian Army, Austro-Hungarian Aviation Troops, Luftwaffe
- Service years: 1915-1918, 1939-1945
- Rank: Leutnant (later Major)
- Units: Flik 60J, Flik 9J
- Conflicts: World War I, World War II
- Awards: Order of the Iron Crown, Military Merit Cross, Medal for Bravery (2 awards), Military Merit Medal; Prussian War Merit Medal

Lieutenant Alois Rodlauer (1897-1975) was an Austro-Hungarian World War I flying ace credited with five aerial victories. Originally a valorous infantry officer in 1915, 1916 and 1917, he turned to aviation in mid-1917. After pilot training, he managed to score five aerial victories between March and October 1918, despite two spells in hospital. Rodlauer returned to civilian life postwar, but returned to serve in the Luftwaffe from 1939 to 1945. He died a natural death in 1975. In 1983, aviation historians pieced together Rodlauer's combat record and realized he was an ace.

== Early life and entry into military ==
Alois Rodlauer was born on 15 July 1897 in Urfahr, Austria. He was a science student in school. He joined the Austrian Army in 1915, being Commissioned into the 12th Infantry Regiment. His valorous service with the infantry gained him the Silver Medal for Bravery, First Class, the Bronze Military Merit Medal, and the Prussian War Merit Medal. On 1 February 1917, he was promoted to Leutnant.

== Aviation career ==
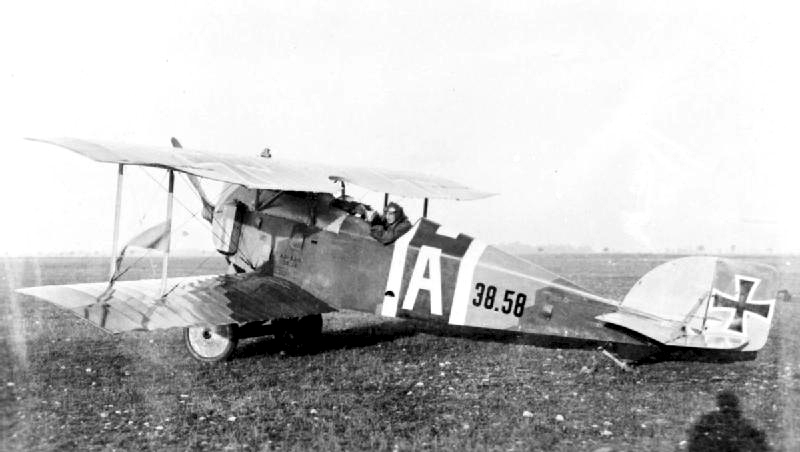
A typical 1917 Aviatik D.I.

Rodlauer applied for transfer to the Austro-Hungarian Aviation Troops in early 1917. He was accepted in July and was sent for training. He did not qualify as a pilot until 20 December 1917, being granted Austrian Pilot Certificate No. 934. On 17 March 1918, he was posted off to Flik 60J at Feltre in northern Italy, under command of Oberleutnant Frank Linke-Crawford; the unit was equipped with a mix of Aviatik and Phönix D.I fighters. Rodlauer's aircraft were distinguished by a large white letter 'R' painted on a black band encircling the fuselage. Only ten days after his arrival, a crash hospitalized Rodlauer until May. Still, by June, Rodlauer had managed to share three confirmed victories with other pilots, though at the time he was not credited with them. He was awarded the Military Merit Cross with War Decorations and Swords for this feat.

On 9 July 1918, Rodlauer transferred to Flik 9J; the unit not only had Aviatiks and Phönix D.Is, but also Albatros fighters. Flik 9J mostly flew defensive escort missions for two-seater reconnaissance planes, taking more casualties than they inflicted. Nevertheless, Rodlauer scored two more victories in October 1918. In late October, he was injured in a forced landing after being shot down. He was still in hospital when the war ended.

== Post World War I life ==
A postwar Orders Commission accepted a document from the Flik 9J commanding officer verifying Rodlauer's two October 1918 victories. He was awarded the Order of the Iron Crown with War Decorations and Swords.

Rodlauer returned to Linz postwar and set up in an electrical business. In 1939, as World War II began, he returned to service in the Luftwaffe. He was serving in the rank of major as a liaison officer in Belgrade, Yugoslavia when American forces captured him in 1945.

Alois Rodlauer died in Linz, Austria on 26 April 1975 of natural causes.

In 1983, aviation historians piecing together Austro-Hungarian records discovered a quirk. Until early 1918, Austro-Hungarian authorities had awarded a victory to all pilots involved in shooting down an enemy aircraft. Then, for about six to eight months, the requirements were tightened, and the rule became one victory, one victor. During this period, Rodlauer assisted in shooting down three enemy airplanes that were credited solely to other pilots. However, the policy switched back in latter 1918; as a result, Rodlauer was belatedly given his three early victories and was posthumously recognized as an ace.

== Sources ==
- Franks, Norman; Alegi, Gregory; Guest, Russell (2008), Above the War Fronts: A Complete Record of the British Two-seater Bomber Pilot and Observer Aces, the British Two-seater Fighter Observer Aces, and the Belgian, Italian, Austro-Hungarian, and Russian Fighter Aces, 1914-1918, London: Grub Street, ISBN 978-1898697565
- O'Connor, Dr. Martin (1995), Air Aces of the Austro-Hungarian Empire 1914-1918, Flying Machines Press, ISBN 978-0-9637110-1-4
