= Paul Rodde =

French aviator (1894–1917)

Paul Georges Alexandre Rodde
- Born: 17 May 1894; Fontainebleau, France
- Died: 29 October 1917 (aged 23)
- Military career
- Allegiance: France
- Branch: Hussars; aviation
- Service years: 1914–1917
- Rank: Sergent
- Units: Escadrille MF.55; Escadrille MF.32; Escadrille N.69

Paul Georges Alexandre Rodde (17 May 1894 – 29 October 1917) was a French World War I flying ace credited with five confirmed aerial victories.

== Biography ==
Georges Alexandre Rodde was born on 17 May 1894 in Fontainebleau, France.

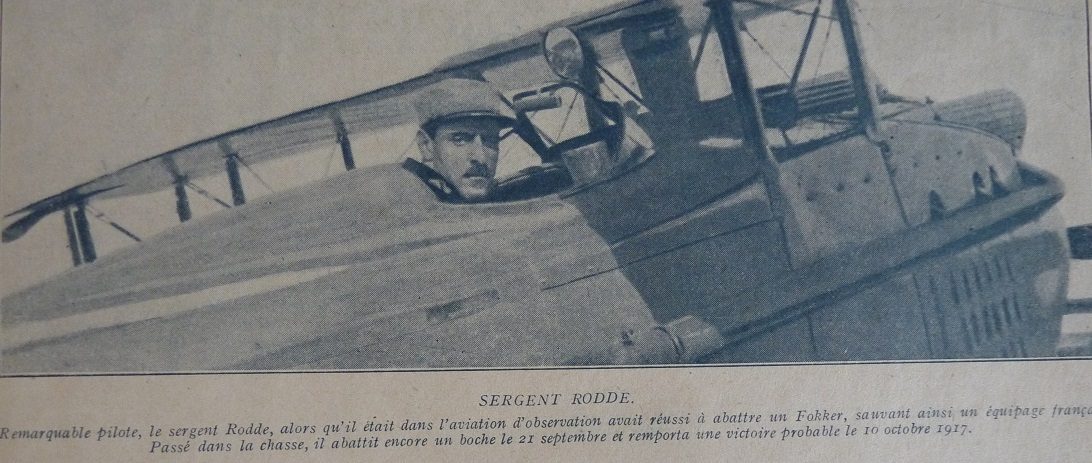
Paul Rodde in a SPAD VII fighter, approximate date October 1917.

His military service began on 4 September 1914 as an infantryman. On 6 December 1914, he was transferred to aviation duty. In May 1915, he reported for pilot training. His Military Pilot's Brevet was awarded to him on 23 September 1915. On 3 October, he was posted to a bombing squadron, Escadrille MF.55. He was promoted to Sergent on 21 January 1916. He scored his first victory with this unit on 28 May 1916 before transferring to another bombing squadron, Escadrille MF.23, on 3 March 1917. He shot down a second German airplane on 21 May 1917. Transferred on 30 July 1917 to a fighter unit, Escadrille Spa.69, he scored three more victories during September and October 1917, including an observation balloon. As his fifth victory, the destruction of the balloon made him an ace.

Paul Rodde perished in a flying accident in the line of duty on 29 October 1917.

== See also ==
- Aerial victory standards of World War I
