= Hetero (disambiguation) =

Hetero derives from the Greek word heteros meaning "different" or "other". It may refer to:

- Heterodoxy, belief or practice that differs from what is assumed as orthodoxy
- Heterosexuality, attraction towards the opposite sex
- Hetero Drugs, an Indian pharmaceutical company
