= 121st Infantry Regiment (France) =

- 121e régiment d'infanterie
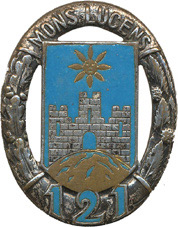
- Active: 1794–1945
- Country: France
- Branch: French Army
- Role: Infantry
- Size: Regiment
- Garrison/HQ: Montluçon, France
- Motto: Mons Lucens
- Engagements: French Revolutionary War; Napoleonic Wars; World War I World War II

The 121st Infantry Regiment (121e régiment d'infanterie de ligne) was a military unit in the French Army. It was formed in 1794 as the 121e Demi-Brigade de Bataille, merging the 1st battalion of the 62nd Infantry Regiment, the 1st battalion of volontaires de l'Union and the 7th battalion of the volontaires du Var. The 39e Demi-Brigade d'Infanterie de Ligne was merged into it in 1796.

It was re-formed in 1809 as the 121st Line Infantry Regiment, using the survivors from the 1st and 2nd reserve legions raised in 1807. It was disbanded in 1814, but was reformed again in 1914 and went on to fight in World War I. It was disbanded after the end of the First World War in 1918, only to be re-raised again in 1940. In 1940 it became attached to the 25th Motorized Infantry Division, which was itself attached to the 1st Army Corps which was integrated into General Henri Giraud's 7th Army. The regiment was disbanded after the Fall of France. In January 1945, it was re-established with men from the FFI de l'Allier in the Montluçon region. After the World War II on 4 July 1945, it was disbanded for the final time at Moulins.

== See also ==
- List of French Army regiments

== Bibliography ==
- Recueil d'Historiques de l'Infanterie Française (Général Andolenko - Eurimprim 1969)
