= Wilhelm Thöne =

German flying ace

- Born: 22 January 1893; Hattenbach, Germany
- Died: 17 January 1974 (aged 80); Mülheim, Germany
- Military career
- Allegiance: Germany
- Branch: Aviation
- Rank: Vize-Flugmeister der Reserve
- Nickname: Willy
- Unit: Marine-Feld Jagdstaffel 1
- Awards: Iron Cross

Vize-Flugmeister der Reserve Wilhelm Thöne was a German World War I flying ace credited with six aerial victories.

== Biography ==
See also Aerial victory standards of World War I

Wilhelm Thöne was a German naval pilot who flew for Marine-Feld Jagdstaffel 1 during the last year of the First World War. On 30 June 1918, he shot down two British Sopwith Camels—one from No. 204 Squadron RAF, the other from No. 213 Squadron RAF. On 31 July, he shot down a third Camel, also from 204 Squadron. However, he also took some bullets to his craft's engine, forcing him down behind German lines. Back in action, he shot down a pair of Camels to become an ace on 12 August 1918. Also in August, he was downed a second time. He swam ashore from the English Channel despite a bullet in his shoulder.

Thöne became an engineer postwar. He would also become a director of German Civil Aviation.
