= Gerald Pilditch =

- Born: 27 October 1892
- Died: November 1956 (age 64)
- Military career
- Allegiance: Union of South Africa
- Branch: Flying service
- Rank: Lieutenant
- Unit: No. 73 Squadron RAF
- Awards: Military Cross

Lieutenant Gerald Pilditch MC (27 October 1892-November 1956) was a South African World War I flying ace credited with five aerial victories. He won a Military Cross on 11 April 1918. On 11 June, he rescued American pilot Lieutenant J. H. Ackermann from six German fighters. Pilditch shot down one, and possibly two, of the three Germans who were on the wounded American's tail.
