= Jacques Victor Sabattier de Vignolle =

Reserve officer

- Born: 22 May 1888; Paris, France
- Died: 8 January 1968 (aged 81)
- Military career
- Allegiance: France
- Branch: Artillery; aviation
- Rank: Capitaine
- Units: Escadrille MF.36; Escadrille S.398; Escadrille N.48
- Commands: Escadrille S.398; Escadrille N.48; Groupe de Combat 18; Groupe de Combat 20
- Awards: Legion d'Honneur, Croix de Guerre; Mentioned in dispatches by Serbian Army

Capitaine Jacques Victor Sabattier de Vignolle was a reservist officer of the French Army called to the colors during the First World War. While serving in a succession of increasingly important commands, he also flew a SPAD fighter to shoot down five German airplanes and become a flying ace. Thrice wounded, he ended the war commanding an air wing.

== Biography ==
See also Aerial victory standards of World War I

Jacques Victor Sabattier de Vignolle was born in Paris on 22 May 1888.

At the start of World War I, on 2 August 1914, Sabattier de Vignolle was mustered from the reserves to serve on active duty as a lieutenant in an artillery regiment. On 17 March 1915, he was assigned to Escadrille MF.36 as an observer. On 16 June, he took shrapnel in the abdomen; in September, he was again wounded, in the right wrist.

On 18 May 1916, he was forwarded to pilot's training; on 2 August, he received his Military Pilot's Brevet. On the 24th, he joined Escadrille S.398 in Serbia. He took command of the squadron on 1 October 1916. On 14 November, he was promoted to Capitaine. The Serbian Army would mention him in dispatches for his efforts.

Recalled to France on 10 April 1917, he found himself reassigned to Escadrille N.48 on 20 June. On 11 September, he was raised to command the squadron. Later in September, he submitted two claims for aerial victories, but they went uncredited. Then he was grazed in the head by a bullet on 24 October 1917. On 3 December, he finally scored an aerial victory, teaming with Edmond Caillaux to shoot down an Aviatik two-seat reconnaissance craft. Then, on 15 December, aided by Robert Delannoy and Gilbert de Guingand, he shot down another two-seater.

On 25 January 1918, he was raised to the command of a larger unit, Groupe de Combat 18. He shot down at least one German plane while leading the Groupe, on 15 May 1918. He would subsequently shoot down two more German planes to become a flying ace.

On 19 September 1918, he was shifted to command of Groupe de Combat 20. He would retain that position through war's end on 11 November 1918. By then, Sabattier de Vignolle had been awarded the Legion d'honneur, as well as the Croix de Guerre with seven palms, to go with his Serbian commendation.

Jacques Victor Sabattier de Vignolle died on 8 January 1968.
