= Osborne Orr =

Canadian WWI flying ace

Osborne John Orr
- Born: 15 July 1895; Nanaimo, British Columbia, Canada
- Died: 23 October 1918 (aged 23); Vicinity of Termonde
- Burial place: Pas de Calais, France
- Military career
- Allegiance: British
- Branch: Flying service
- Rank: Lieutenant
- Unit: No. 204 Squadron RAF
- Awards: Distinguished Flying Cross

Lieutenant Osborne John Orr DFC (15 July 1895 – 23 October 1918) was a Canadian World War I flying ace credited with five aerial victories.

He was posthumously awarded the Distinguished Flying Cross in the 1919 New Year Honours.
