= Roger Neville =

British World War I flying ace (1895–1986)

Roger Henry Gartside Neville
- Born: 8 March 1895; St. Pancras, London, England
- Died: May 1986 (aged 91); Uckfield, Surrey, England
- Spouses: Marion A. Chorlton (m. 1918–1942) Joyce E. Oulton (m. 1943)
- Relatives: Henry Gartside Neville (grandfather)
- Military career
- Branch: British Army; Royal Air Force
- Service years: 1915–c.1946
- Rank: Group Captain
- Units: Duke of Cornwall's Light Infantry; No. 21 Squadron RFC; No. 23 Squadron RFC
- Commands: No. 29 Squadron RAF; No. 60 Squadron RAF
- Conflicts: World War I • Western Front; World War II
- Awards: Military Cross; Order of the British Empire

Group Captain Roger Henry Gartside Neville, OBE, MC (8 March 1895 – May 1986) was a British World War I flying ace credited with five aerial victories. He remained in the RAF post war serving as a squadron commander, and then as a staff officer, until after the end of the World War II.

== Biography ==
=== Family background ===
Roger Neville was born in St. Pancras, London, the son of John Ernest Gartside Neville, a stockbroker, and his wife Jane (née Gartside). His grandfather was the actor and theatrical manager Henry Gartside Neville.

=== First World War ===
After attending the Royal Military College, Sandhurst, as a "gentlemen cadet", Neville was commissioned as a second lieutenant in the Duke of Cornwall's Light Infantry on 14 July 1915. He was soon seconded to the Royal Flying Corps, and appointed a flying officer on 18 November. He joined No. 21 Squadron in early 1916, to fly a Royal Aircraft Factory B.E.12 single-seat bomber. On 21 July 1916 he was appointed a flight commander with the temporary rank of captain.

Neville scored his first aerial victory on 14 September 1916, destroying a German LVG two-seater reconnaissance aircraft south-west of Vélu. Eight days later, he was wounded in action. In November he was awarded the Military Cross. His citation read:

Second Lieutenant (Temporary Captain) Roger Henry Gartside Neville, Duke of Cornwall's Light Infantry and Royal Flying Corps.

"For conspicuous skill and gallantry. He is a fine leader of patrol work, and has done much to keep enemy machines away from our lines. On one occasion, flying in a rainstorm, after nearly colliding with an enemy machines he pursued it and brought it down half a mile from an enemy aerodrome."

Neville returned to duty, assigned to No. 23 Squadron, to fly a Spad VII single-seat fighter. He received a regimental promotion, to lieutenant in the DCLI on 1 July 1917. He gained a double aerial victory on 6 July 1917, destroying and driving down out of control two Albatros D.Vs over Tourcoing, and on 11 July he drove down another D.V out of control over Westrozebeke. His fifth and final victory came on 27 July, when he and Second Lieutenant Frederick J. Gibbs shared in the destruction of an Aviatik C over Kezelberg.

=== Postwar career ===
Neville remained seconded to the RAF after the end of the war, and his period of service was extended for two years on 1 August 1919, again on 1 August 1921, and for a third time on 1 August 1923, by which time he held the rank of flight lieutenant.

Neville was eventually granted a permanent commission in the RAF on 5 March 1924, and was promoted to squadron leader on 1 July. On 12 August he was appointed commanding officer of No. 29 Squadron RAF, based at RAF Duxford, and the following year lead his squadron in the 1925 Air Defence Manoeuvres, as part of the defending forces of "Westland" against the attackers from "Eastland". On 3 July 1926 he took part in an exhibition of close formation flying by nine aircraft from six fighter squadrons — 54 in all — as part of the seventh RAF Aerial Pageant at Hendon Aerodrome, at which time No. 29 Squadron were flying Gloster Grebes.

On 2 September 1927 he took command of No. 60 Squadron RAF, based in India. On 26 June 1931 he was made an Officer of the Order of the British Empire (Military Division) "for valuable services in connection with the operations on the North-West Frontier of India between 23 April and 12 September 1930".

On 1 July 1932 he was promoted to wing commander, and on 19 July took command of the RAF School of Photography at South Farnborough. He then served as Station Commander of RAF North Weald until 14 December 1933, when he was appointed a staff officer at the Headquarters of the Central Area, Air Defence of Great Britain, at RAF Abingdon. On 27 August 1936 he was posted to the Headquarters of the Armament Group at RAF Eastchurch. Neville was promoted to group captain on 1 July 1937.

Neville served in the RAF throughout the Second World War, receiving a mention in despatches on 1 January 1946.

== Personal life ==
Neville married Marion Aldyth Chorlton (1899–1942), of Prestwich, on 2 April 1918. They had one son, Christopher Roger Gartside Neville (1924–1998), who joined the RAF in 1944, and served until 1979, retiring with the rank of Air Commodore. After his first wife's death he married Joyce E. Oulton at Hove, Sussex, in December 1943.

== Bibliography ==
- Shores, Christopher F.; Franks, Norman & Guest, Russell F. (1990). Above the Trenches: a Complete Record of the Fighter Aces and Units of the British Empire Air Forces 1915–1920. London, UK: Grub Street. ISBN 978-0-948817-19-9.
