= Arbas =

Arbas Arbàs (Occitan)
- Commune
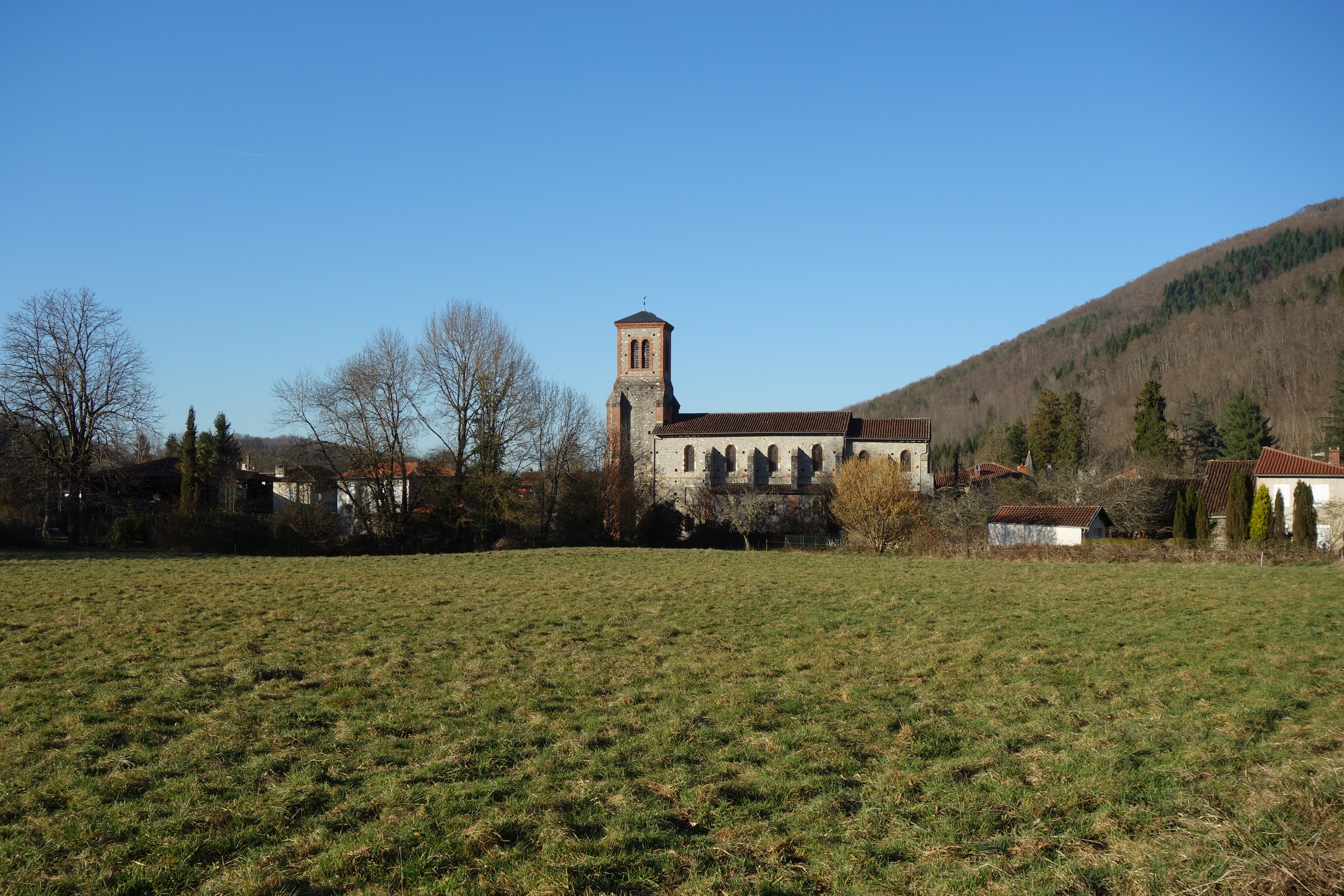
- A general view of Arbas
- Location of Arbas
- Location within France Location within Occitanie
- Coordinates: 42°59′48″N 0°54′24″E
- Country: France
- Region: Occitania
- Department: Haute-Garonne
- Arrondissement: Saint-Gaudens
- Canton: Bagnères-de-Luchon

Government
  - Mayor (2022–2026): Jean Cazes
- Area^{1}: 7.32 km^{2} (2.83 sq mi)
- Elevation: 405 m (1,329 ft)
- Highest elevation: 840 m (2,760 ft)
- Lowest elevation: 392 m (1,286 ft)
- Population (2023): 285
  - Density: 38.9/km^{2} (101/sq mi)
- Time zone: UTC+01:00 (CET)
  - Summer (DST): UTC+02:00 (CEST)
- INSEE/Postal code: 31011 /31160
- ^{1} French Land Register data, which excludes lakes, ponds, glaciers > 1 km^{2} (0.386 sq mi or 247 acres) and river estuaries.

Arbas (Arbàs in Occitan) is a commune in the Haute-Garonne department in southwestern France.

== Population ==
Historical population
Year	Pop.	±% p.a.
1968	213	—
1975	166	−3.50%
1982	180	+1.16%
1990	158	−1.62%
1999	186	+1.83%
2007	247	+3.61%
2012	227	−1.67%
2017	263	+2.99%
2023	285	+1.35%
Source: INSEE

== See also ==
- Communes of the Haute-Garonne department
