= Frank Billinge =

- Born: 19 December 1894; Manchester, England
- Died: 28 September 1928 (aged 33)
- Military career
- Allegiance: United Kingdom
- Branch: British Army; Royal Air Force
- Service years: 1914–1918
- Rank: Captain
- Nickname: Pongo
- Units: Manchester Regiment; No. 20 Squadron RFC; No. 32 Squadron RFC; No. 56 Squadron RAF
- Conflicts: World War I
- Awards: Distinguished Flying Cross

Captain Frank Billinge, DFC (19 December 1894 – 28 September 1928) was a World War I flying ace credited with five aerial victories.

== Military service ==
Billinge was commissioned as a probationary second lieutenant in the 3rd (Reserve) Battalion, Manchester Regiment, from the Officers' Training Corps on 15 August 1914, being confirmed in the rank in March 1915, and promoted to Lieutenant in April 1915.

Billinge was a founding member of No. 20 Squadron, in September 1915, flying as an observer/gunner in the front seat of a FE.2b. He scored his first victory there, on 13 February 1916. He was transferred back to Home Establishment in England for pilot training on 31 August 1916. His first posting as a pilot was to No. 32 Squadron, on 24 November 1916, to fly a DH 2. For his next two kills, of two-seater observation planes, he set his opponents on fire, on 23 and 27 January 1917. He was promoted to Flight Commander on 12 March 1917, and served in that capacity until 1 June 1917. He was then withdrawn from combat until he was assigned to No. 56 Squadron on 16 February 1918. Once again a Flight Commander, flying a Royal Aircraft Factory SE.5a, he drove down another observation plane on 19 February, and an Albatros D.V on 22 March 1918.

Billinge was promoted to captain in the 3rd Manchesters on 1 July 1921, with seniority from 31 March 1919.

== Honours and awards ==
Distinguished Flying Cross
Captain Frank Billinge (Manchester Regiment).
A gallant officer who displays determination and judgment. When on a night reconnaissance his engine suddenly failed and he was compelled to head for home. At this moment he was attacked by an enemy aeroplane. Owing to engine trouble he was forced to avoid an engagement, and only escaped by the exercise of marked skill and resource. With great difficulty he managed to cross our trenches at a height of 200 feet, crashing into the reserve trenches behind. Although considerably shaken and bruised he and his observer proceeded to the nearest signal station and sent in their reconnaissance report.

== Personal life ==
In August 1919, Billinge married Millicent Constance Grosvenor, daughter of Lord Henry George Grosvenor and Dora Mina Erskine-Wemyss. He died on 28 September 1928.
