= Saint-Chaptes =

- Commune
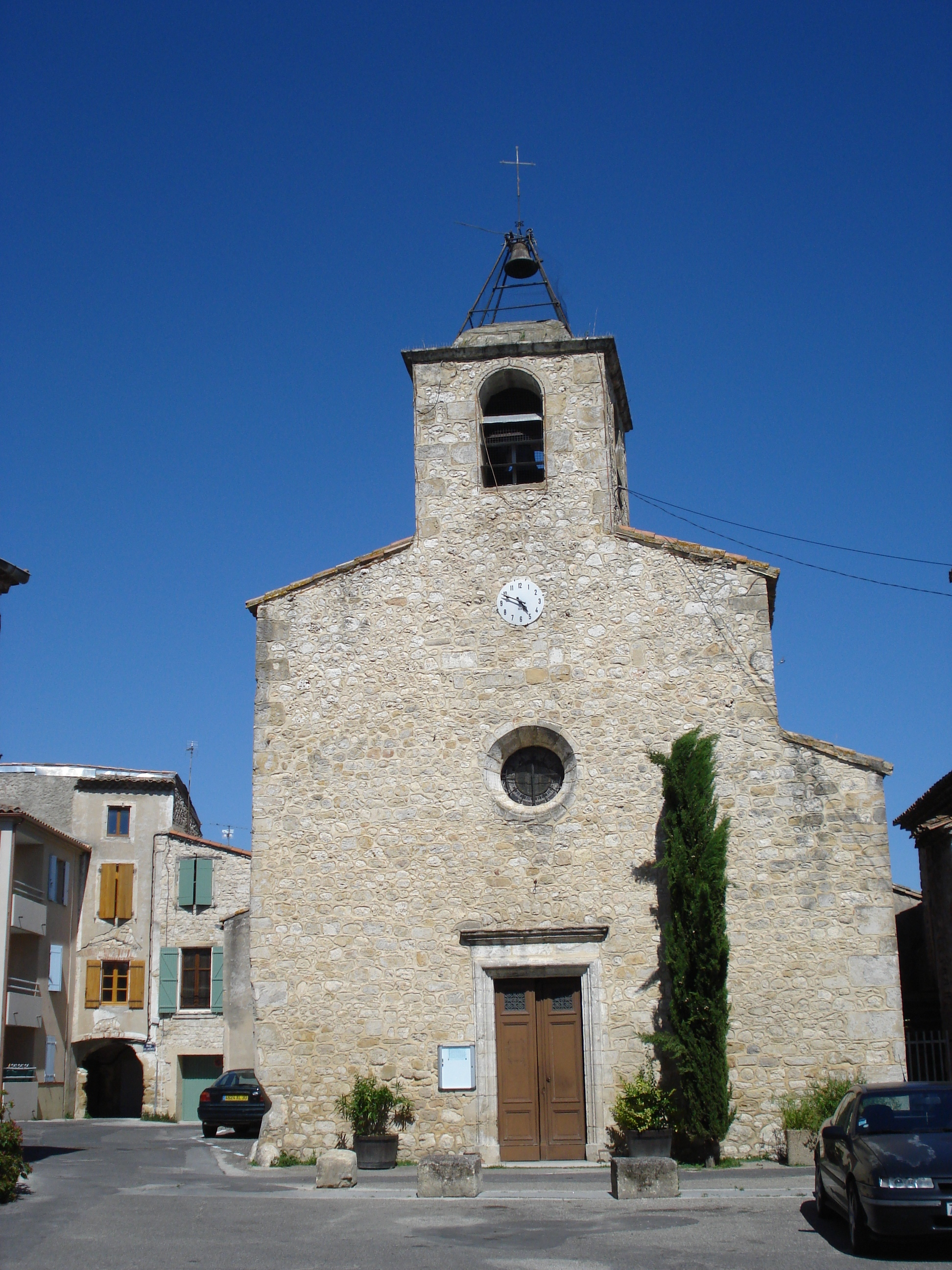
- The church of Saint-Chaptes

- Coat of arms
- Location of Saint-Chaptes
- Location within France Location within Occitanie
- Coordinates: 43°58′19″N 4°16′47″E
- Country: France
- Region: Occitania
- Department: Gard
- Arrondissement: Nîmes
- Canton: Uzès
- Intercommunality: CA Nîmes Métropole

Government
  - Mayor (2020–2026): Jean-Claude Mazaudier
- Area^{1}: 13.07 km^{2} (5.05 sq mi)
- Elevation: 76 m (249 ft)
- Highest elevation: 101 m (331 ft)
- Lowest elevation: 58 m (190 ft)
- Population (2023): 2,055
  - Density: 157.2/km^{2} (407.2/sq mi)
- Time zone: UTC+01:00 (CET)
  - Summer (DST): UTC+02:00 (CEST)
- INSEE/Postal code: 30241 /30190
- ^{1} French Land Register data, which excludes lakes, ponds, glaciers > 1 km^{2} (0.386 sq mi or 247 acres) and river estuaries.

Saint-Chaptes (French pronunciation: [sɛ̃ ʃapt]; Provençal: Sench Agde) is a commune in the Gard department in southern France.

== Population ==
Historical population
Year	Pop.	±% p.a.
1968	714	—
1975	652	−1.29%
1982	814	+3.22%
1990	889	+1.11%
1999	1,184	+3.24%
2007	1,520	+3.17%
2012	1,743	+2.78%
2017	1,865	+1.36%
2023	2,055	+1.63%
Source: INSEE

== See also ==
- Communes of the Gard department
