= Albert Chmielowski =

Polish noble and saint

Saint Albert Chmielowski TOSF
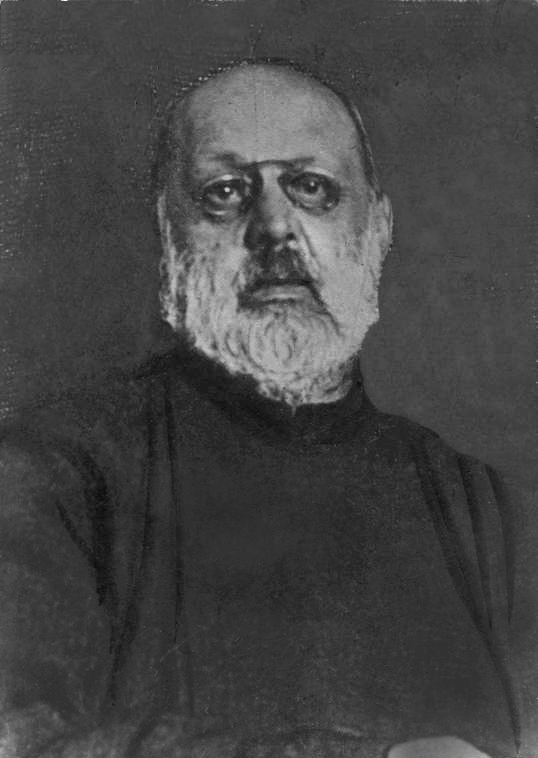
- Jastrzębiec coat of arms

Religious
- Born: Adam Hilary Bernard Chmielowski; 20 August 1845; Igołomia, Małopolskie, Congress Poland
- Died: 25 December 1916 (aged 71); Kraków, Kingdom of Poland
- Venerated in: Roman Catholic Church
- Beatified: 22 June 1983, Kraków, Poland by Pope John Paul II
- Canonized: 12 November 1989, Saint Peter's Square, Vatican City by Pope John Paul II
- Feast: 17 June
- Patronage: Painters; Servants of the Poor; Sisters Servants of the Poor; Franciscan tertiaries; Soldiers; Volunteers; Harvests; Travellers; Puławy; Diocese of Sosnowiec

Albert Chmielowski (20 August 1845 – 25 December 1916) – born Adam Hilary Bernard Chmielowski – was a Polish Franciscan tertiary, painter, and disabled veteran of the Uprising of 1863. He was founder of both the Albertine Brothers and Albertine Sisters who are servants of the homeless and destitute.

== Life ==
Chmielowski was born in Igołomia, on the outskirts of Kraków Congress Poland, into a szlachta family, the eldest of four to Wojciech Chmielowski, (1811–1853) and Józefa Borzysławska (1821–1859). His siblings were Stanisław Teodor (b. 1848), Jadwiga Modesta Szaniawska (b. 1850) and Marian Antoni (1852–1903). Due to the lack of a priest in turbulent times, Albert was baptised by a lay on 26 August 1845. A formal baptism followed on 17 June 1847.

He was orphaned at age 8 when his father died and, 10 years later, by the death of his mother. Guardianship and care of the family fell to their paternal aunt, Petronela. After home schooling Chmielowski went on to study agroforestry at the Puławy Polytechnic Institute with a view to managing his late parents' estate.

=== Insurgent for his country ===
He became involved in independence politics and joined the January Uprising. Chmielowski participated in a battle on 1 October 1863 in which a Russian grenade killed his horse and damaged his leg to the extent that it had to be amputated. The injured Chmielowski had been carried to a woodman's cabin where Finnish soldiers allied with Russia found him. The captain recognized him since there were persistent rumours that Chmielowski evaded all gunfire and was invulnerable, but told him his leg had to be removed, to which Chmielowski is believed to have said: "Give me a cigar – that will help me pass the time". The operation went ahead, successfully though without anesthesia. He offered his intense suffering to God as he endured the excruciating pain. Chmielowski was then taken to a hospital for a doctor to assess him – the soldiers then needed to decide what to do with their captive – but accomplices helped him to escape from the hospital hidden in a coffin. He was eventually fitted with a permanent wooden prosthesis. He offered up his loss of a limb to God and for the cause of Polish independence.

The vicious response of the Czarist authorities to this insurrection forced Chmielowski to leave Poland. He stopped in Ghent in Belgium where he resumed engineering studies. During this period he discovered he also had a talent for painting which he began to develop, despite the objections of family trustees at his change of direction.

=== Painting interlude ===
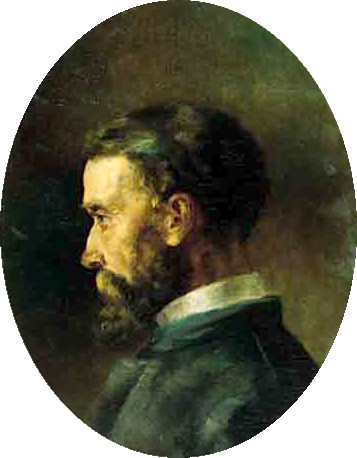
Adam Chmielowski by Aleksander Gierymski, oil

This was however short-lived and in 1870 he joined the Munich Art Academy, where he was befriended by some celebrated Polish artists, including Stanisław Witkiewicz, Józef Chełmoński, Aleksander Gierymski, and Leon Wyczółkowski. He was prolific and sent his work to exhibitions in Poland. He was for time a popular artist. Religious themes began to appear at this juncture such as his St. Margaret's vision and his most celebrated work, Ecce homo, currently in the chapel of the Albertine Sisters in Kraków.

Adam Chmielowski's extant artistic output includes 61 oils, 22 watercolours and 15 drawings. Among his better known works are: Po pojedynku ("After the duel"), Dziewczynka z pieskiem ("Little girl with a dog"), Cmentarz ("Cemetery"), Dama z listem ("Lady with a letter"), Powstaniec na koniu ("Insurgent on horseback"), Zachód słońca ("Sunset") and Amazonka ("The amazon"). In 1874 he became a well-known and popular artist in Kraków and worked as a painter until 1875. He first went back to Munich from Paris before returning to his homeland where he published an article asserting that art was to be "the friend of man". He lived in Warsaw for a time before settling in Kraków. He did not like the fame his works bought him and he was even hospitalized on one occasion for depression. His strong political convictions inspired his interest in the human condition and he developed a gentle and compassionate spirit which also made him aware of the suffering of the poor in the area. He felt compelled to help those in need and volunteered in the homeless shelters in Kraków. Years of deep reflection would cause Chmielowski to abandon his painting career in order to live among the poor and to accept a beggar's life. In 1879 he spent a brief period of time in Lwów with a friend.

=== Religious vocation ===
While working on an image of Christ, he had perceived a religious vocation and on 24 September 1880 he entered the novitiate of the Jesuits at Stara Wies but faced a terrible trial at a retreat where he became anxious about his decision, and he soon fell ill. His brother Stanisław came to retrieve him and take him to his home to recuperate, where he decided not to return to the Jesuits because that path was not for him. He soon discovered the Rule of Saint Francis of Assisi which inspired him and prompted him to seek them out with the intention of joining their order. It was around this time that his spiritual director was a Lazarist priest.

On 25 August 1887 he joined the Third Order of Saint Francis and took the religious name Albert. He made his first profession at the hands of the Cardinal Archbishop of Kraków Albin Dunajewski and took up residence in the public shelter where he had been volunteering. In 1888 he took his perpetual religious vows and on 25 August 1888 founded the Servants of the Poor and on 15 January 1891 – alongside Maria Jabłońska – founded a parallel women's congregation known as the Albertine Sisters who organized food and shelter for the homeless and destitute. Chmielowski was to spend a brief period at a Carmelite monastery where he came upon the works of John of the Cross who would be his favourite author. He also came to know the Carmelite superior Raphael Kalinowski, who suggested he might become a Carmelite. Chmielowski, however saw his path as that of a Franciscan.

== Death ==
He died at noon on 25 December 1916 from stomach cancer in the shelter that he had established. He had received the Anointing of the Sick on 23 December when his condition began to deteriorate. He was buried in the Rakowicki Cemetery. His remains were exhumed on 15 September 1932 and placed in a metal coffin. They were exhumed once again on 31 May 1949 and placed in a Discalced Carmelite church.

== Legacy ==
On 10 November 1938 he received a posthumous award in the form of the Order of Polonia Restituta.

Karol Wojtyła in 1949, then a simple priest in Poland, wrote a well-received play about Albert, entitled Brat naszego Boga which was made into a film with the same title in 1997. John Paul II later said that he found great spiritual support for his own vocation in the life of the Polish saint whom he saw as an example of leaving behind the world of the arts to make a radical choice in favour of the religious life.

== Sanctity ==
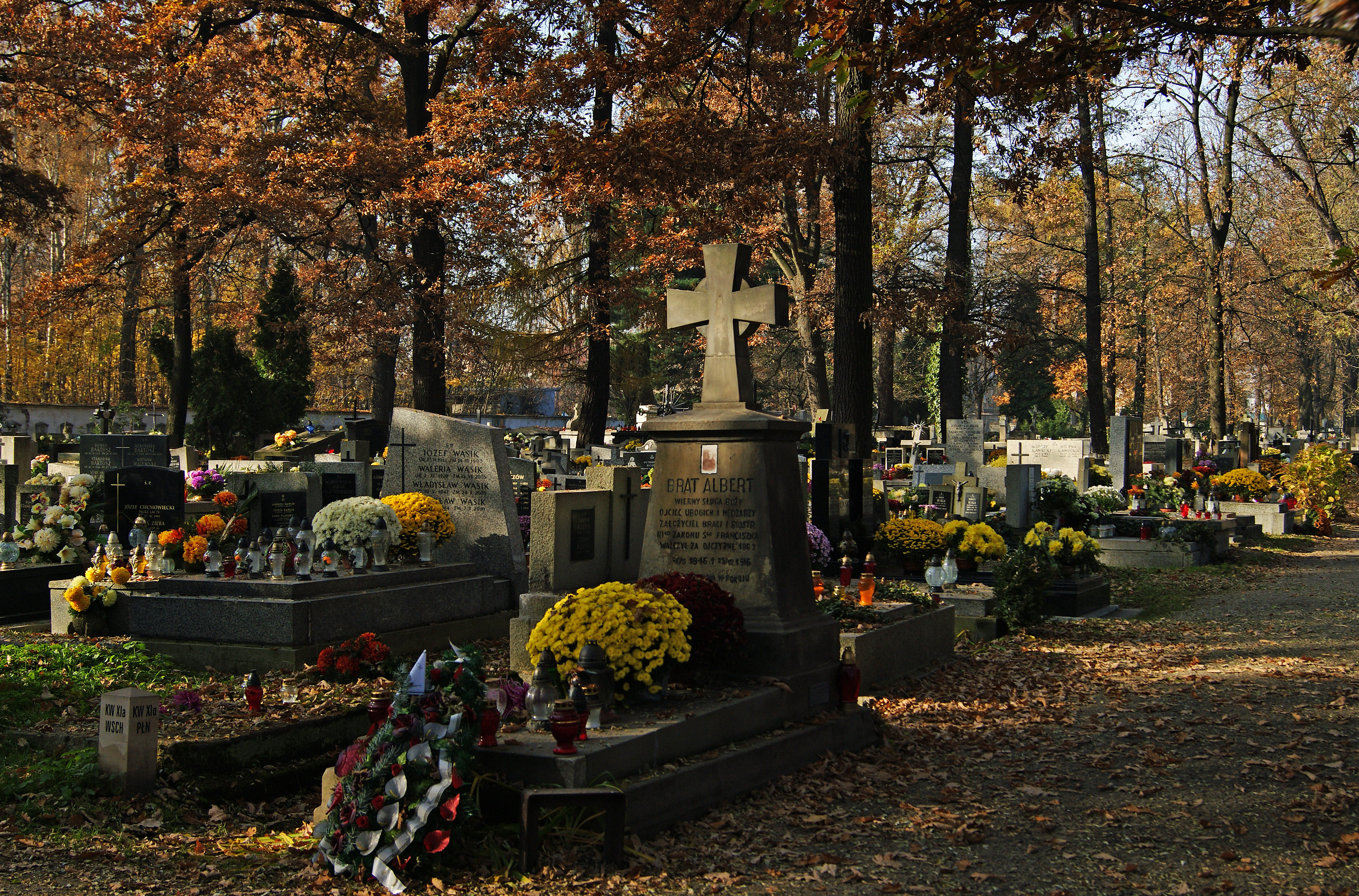
Chmielowski's now empty grave

The canonisation process started in 1966 under Pope Paul VI who later declared him Venerable in 1977 upon the confirmation that the late religious had lived a life of heroic virtue. Pope John Paul II – whom Chmielowski's example had influenced to a significant degree – beatified him in 1983 while in Kraków and later canonized him in 1989 in Saint Peter's Square. His liturgical feast is affixed to 17 June and not his death date, due to that date being Christmas.

The beatification process began with an information process which Cardinal Adam Stefan Sapieha oversaw from its inauguration in 1946, until its closure in 1947. Theologians approved all his spiritual writings as in line with the faith on 3 May 1956. While the formal introduction to the cause came on 27 January 1966 under Pope Paul VI in which he was announced a Servant of God. Cardinal Karol Józef Wojtyła – the future Pope John Paul II – oversaw the apostolic process from 15 September 1967 until 1968 while the Congregation for the Causes of Saints later validated the previous processes in Rome on 17 October 1970. The C.C.S. officials and their consultants approved the cause on 13 March 1976 as did the C.C.S. alone on 30 November 1976 while the confirmation of his life of heroic virtue allowed for Pope Paul VI to name him as Venerable on 20 January 1977.

The beatification miracle was investigated on a diocesan level where it occurred and it later received C.C.S. validation on 27 January 1983. A medical board of experts approved the healing as a miracle on 26 May 1983. Theologians followed up that June with the C.C.S. John Paul II approved the said miracle on 9 June 1983 and beatified Chmielowski while on a visit to Kraków on 22 June 1983.

The canonization miracle was investigated in the diocese of origin from 9 September to 24 November 1987 and this process was given its validation on 26 February 1988 before the medical board met to approve it, several months later, on 23 November 1988. Theological experts also assented to this miracle on 3 February 1989 as did the C.C.S. on 21 February 1989. Then John Paul II approved it on 24 February 1989, confirming that Chmielowski would be proclaimed as a saint in due course. John Paul II canonized Chmielowski on 12 November 1989 in Saint Peter's Square.

== Gallery ==
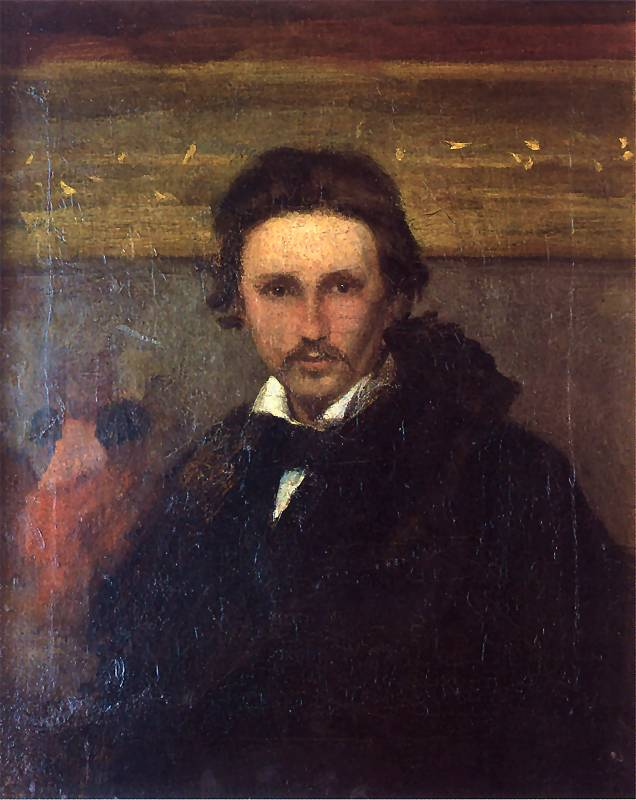
Portrait of Sygietyński

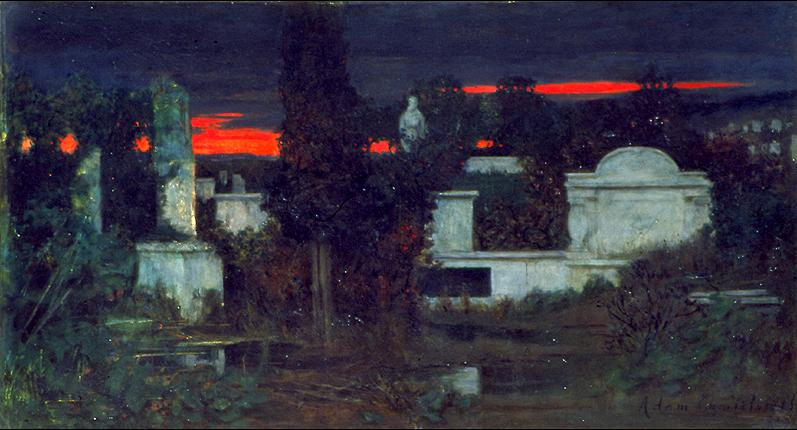
Cmentarz włoski - Italian cemetery at dusk

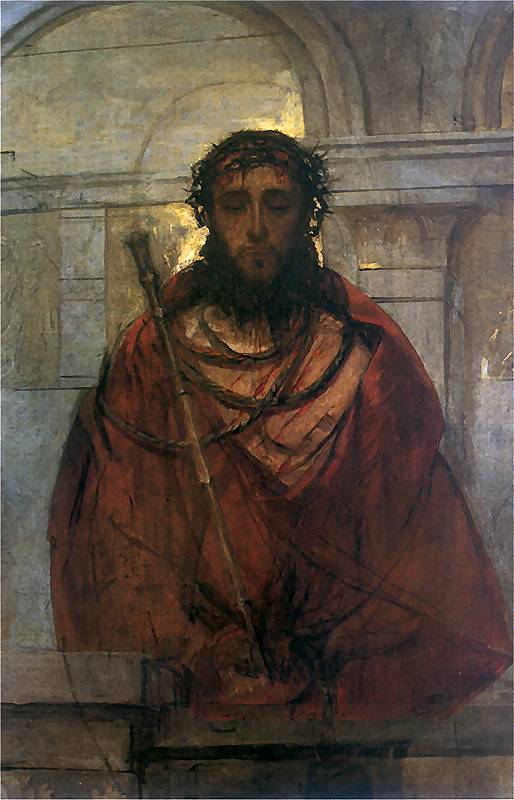
Chmielowski's Ecce Homo, 1879

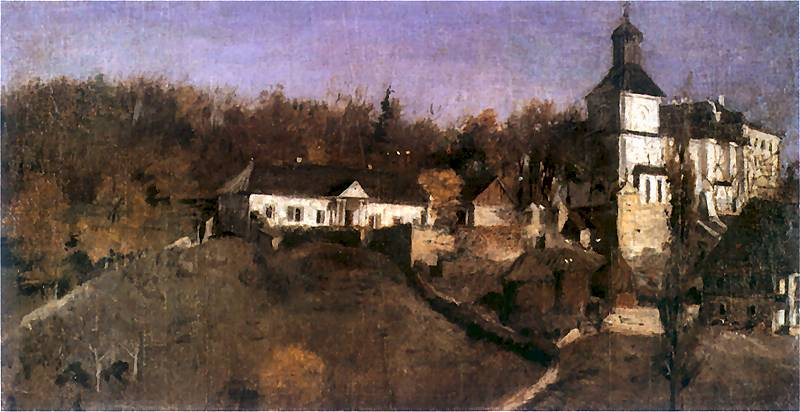
Czarnokozince

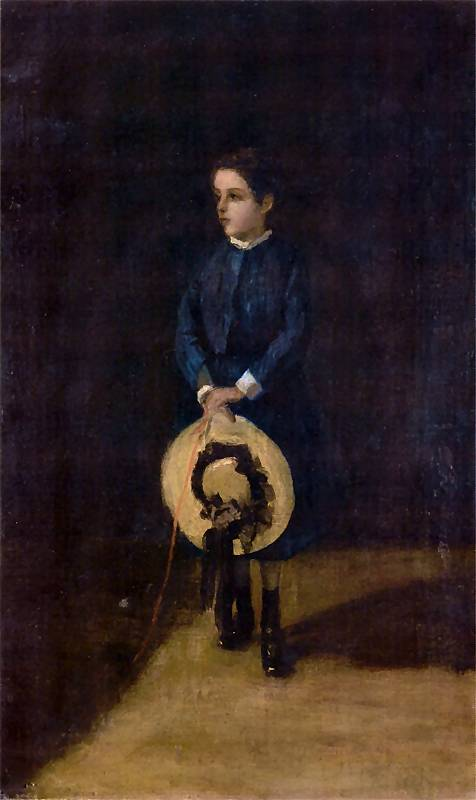
Girl with a hat

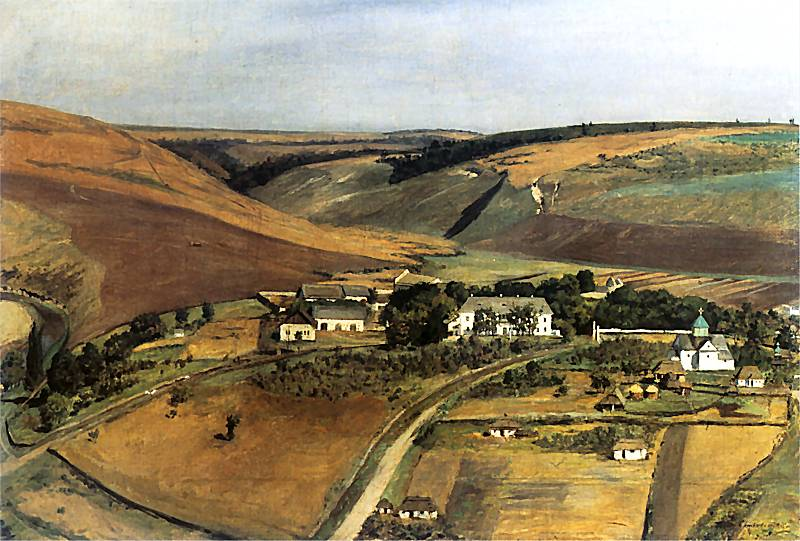
Zawale

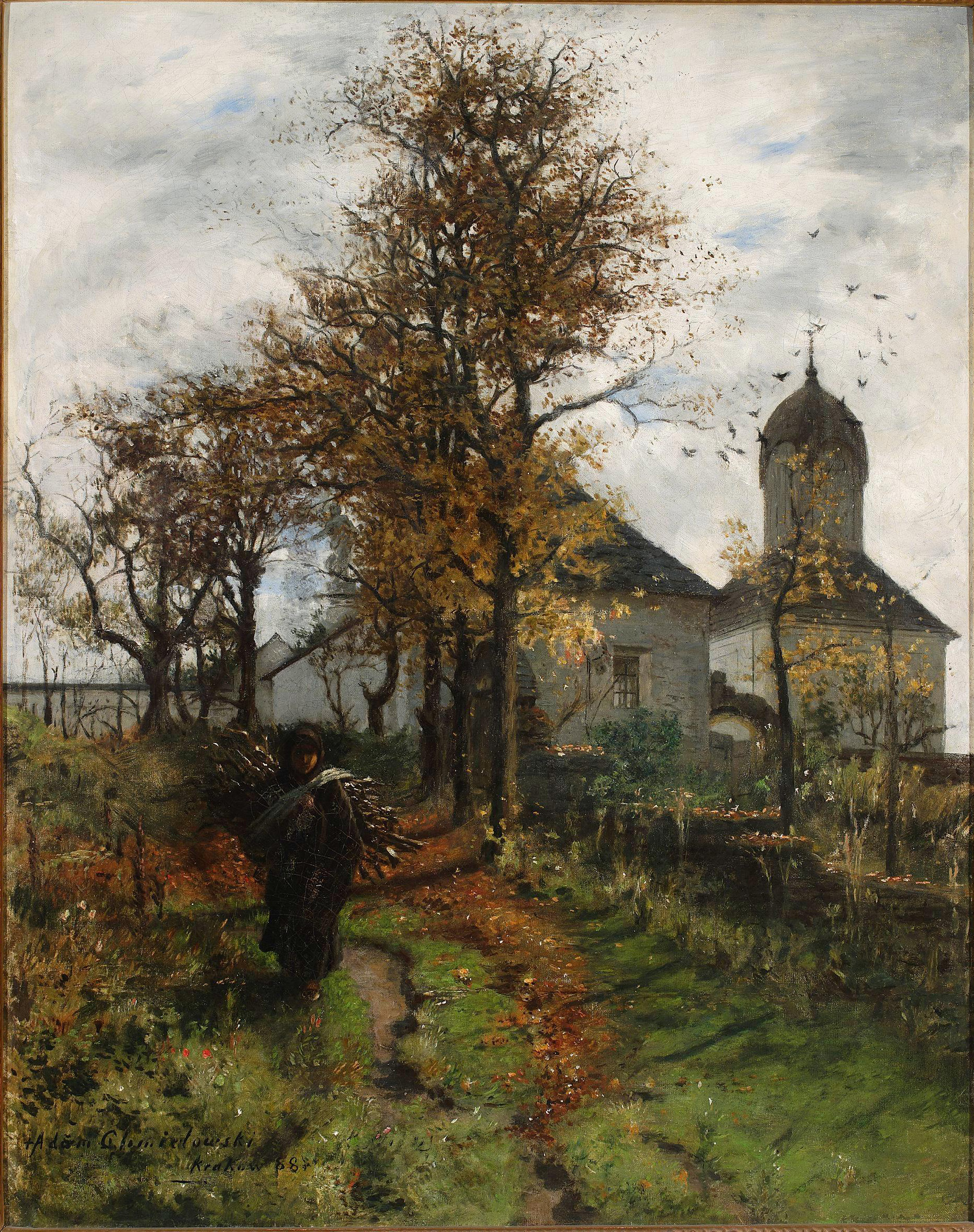
Abandoned parsonage
