= Albertine Brothers =

Roman Catholic religious order

- Abbreviation: C.F.A.P.U.
- Formation: c. AD 1888; 138 years ago
- Founder: Albert Chmielowski
- Type: Catholic religious order
- Headquarters: Poland
- Website: albertyni.opoka.org

The Albertine Brothers are a Catholic congregation of Religious Brothers of the Third Order Regular of St. Francis, called the Servants of the Poor. They were founded in 1888 by Albert Chmielowski in Kraków, Poland.

== History ==
=== Foundations ===
The founder, born Adam Chmielowski (1845-1916), came from an aristocratic Polish family. Orphaned at a young age, he grew up expecting to take responsibility for the family estates and studied agriculture to this end. The young student, however, was a strong Polish nationalist and took part in the January Uprising of 1863, in the course of which he lost a leg.

Chmielowski was forced to flee Poland due to the repressive response of the Czarist authorities and moved to Belgium to continue his studies. During that period, he discovered that he had artistic talent, and began to develop that ability. By the time of his return to Poland in 1874, he was an accomplished painter, who became successful in Kraków.

When he returned to his homeland, though, Chmielowski was struck at the degree of poverty he saw among the people of the country. He began to help at homeless shelters run by the city, where he grew to know the poorest segment of the population at first-hand. Over the next decade, he continued this service, while maintaining his artistic career, though he increasingly turned to religious themes.

By 1887, Chmielowski had decided to abandon his career, to live among the poor and needy and to accept a beggar's life and lifestyle. On 25 August of that year, the feast of the patron saint of the order, Louis, King of France, he became a member of the Third Order of St. Francis, publicly wearing the traditional gray habit of the order and took the name Brother Albert. He began to live in the shelters where he served, giving himself fully to the poor around him and working to give them hope.

=== Congregation ===
Upon the completion of his year of novitiate on the same feast in 1888, Chmielowski was allowed to profess religious vows. At that time, he gathered other men who had expressed interest in sharing his commitment and established the Brothers of the Third Order of St. Francis, Servants of the Poor. He encouraged each new Brother to see the face of Jesus in each one of the poor men and women they would meet in their service.

The Brothers established shelters to give warmth and shelter for the most vulnerable and soup kitchens for the hungry, as well as nurseries and institutions for homeless children and youth. They were joined in their work in January 1891, with the foundation of the companion congregation of Albertine Sisters. The two communities grew slowly, even after the founder's death in 1916. The Brothers were established as a religious congregation in 1928, when they were placed under the Rule of the Franciscan Third Order Regular, with their own Constitutions.

By the outbreak of World War II in 1939, they numbered some 100 members in about a dozen friaries. They were not spared the devastation of the Nazi occupation, however. Several of the houses were closed by the occupying forces, and many of the Brothers were arrested and sent to concentration camps. A large number did not survive, including the Superior General of the Congregation. Those Brothers who did survive did so only to face persecution under the Communist government which took over the country. The remaining institutions of the Congregation were taken over and used for services for which the Brothers were not trained, such as the severely mentally ill.

With the fall of Communism throughout Eastern Europe in 1989, the Brothers again found themselves free to pursue their commitment to needy, who again were increasing in the aftermath of the social changes which took place as a consequence of the political changes. In 2010, the Brothers served in six cities of Poland and one in Ukraine. The services they provide are: houses for homeless men, homes for the mentally and physically handicapped and community kitchens for feeding the poor.
