= Albertine Sisters =

- The Congregation of Albertine Sisters Serving the Poor
- Abbreviation: CSAPI (United States)
- Formation: 15 January 1891; 135 years ago
- Founder: St. Albert Chmielowski and Blessed Bernardyna Maria Jabłońska
- Founded at: Kraków, Poland
- Type: Roman Catholic religious institute
- Headquarters: Krakow, Poland
- Website: https://albertinesisters.org

The Congregation of Albertine Sisters Serving the Poor, or commonly known as the Albertine Sisters, are a Roman Catholic religious institute of sisters.

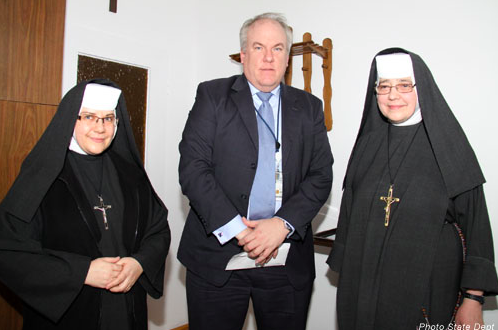
Jeffrey Vick, Consular Section Chief of the US Consulate in Kraków, Poland, with two Albertine Sisters.

== History ==
=== Foundations ===
The founder Adam Chmielowski (1845-1916), later known as Saint Brother Albert, came from an aristocratic Polish family. Orphaned at a young age, he grew up expecting to take responsibility for the family estates and studied agriculture. However, the young student was a strong Polish nationalist and participated in the January Uprising of 1863, during which he lost his leg.

Chmielowski was compelled to flee Poland due to the repressive response of the Czarist authorities and moved to Belgium to continue his studies. During this period, he discovered his artistic talent and began to develop it. By the time of his return to Poland in 1874, he had become an accomplished painter and achieved success in Kraków.

When he returned to his homeland, Chmielowski was struck at the degree of poverty he saw. He began to help at homeless shelters run by the city, where he grew to know the poorest segment of the population at first-hand. Over the next decade, he continued this service, while maintaining his artistic career, though he increasingly turned to religious themes.

By 1887, Chmielowski had made the decision to abandon his career and live among the poor and needy, adopting a beggar's life and lifestyle. On 25 August of that year, the feast of the patron saint of the Order, Saint Louis, King of France, he became a member of the Third Order of St. Francis. He publicly wore the traditional gray habit of the Order and took the name Brother Albert. He began to reside in shelters and dedicated himself entirely to serving the poor.

=== The Congregation ===
Upon the completion of his year of novitiate on the same feast in 1888, Albert Chmielowski was allowed to profess religious vows. At that time, he gathered other men who had expressed interest in sharing his commitment and established the Brothers of the Third Order of St. Francis, Servants of the Poor, in 1888. In the next couple of years, he worked on organizing a congregation for women to serve the poor in conjunction with his Brothers. The first woman to dedicate herself to the cause was Anna Lubańska of the Podlachia region of Poland, later known by her religious name as Sister Frances.

The founding date of the Albertine Sisters was 15 January 1891, when the first seven sisters, including Anna Lubańska, received their habits in the Kraków Bishops' Chapel, in the presence of Brother Albert Chmielowski and Cardinal Albin Dunajewski. Officially called the Sisters of the Third Order of St. Francis Serving the Poor, the first Sisters resided in a shelter for homeless women that they founded, located in Kraków on Skawinska Street.

Initially, Chmielowski had kept the congregation under his direct leadership. However, as both the Brothers and Sisters grew, it is likely that this method of leadership became inadequate. On 7 April 1902, he appointed Sister Bernardina the congregation's first Superior General. Born Maria Jabłońska, she was invested on March 6, 1897. She wrote the basis of the Constitution of the Albertine Sisters in 1917–1918, and presided over a time of significant growth. Sister Bernardina led the congregation for 38 years, until her death on September 23, 1940.

As the Sisters grew in number, they opened more homeless shelters. The oldest remaining is the shelter at 47 Krakowska Street, which Chmielowski had elevated to the main shelter in 1908. By 1916, they were active in the cities of Kraków, Jaroslaw, Przemyśl, Zakopane, and Kandielce in Poland, and Lviv and Sokal in Ukraine. At the time of Sister Bernardina's death, the Albertine Sisters numbered 500 and ran 56 institutions. On June 19, 1926, the Albertine Sisters' leadership met with Prince-Bishop Adam Stefan Sapieha as part of the approval process for the Congregation. Three days later, Sapieha approved the Sisters a congregation of diocesan right. On June 15, 1928, the Sisters established a new motherhouse in Kraków. It held a large chapel, and a postulate and novitiate for young entrants to the Congregation.

In 1947, the gradual socialization of private healthcare and other charitable institutions began. Soon, the Sisters in Poland were left with little control over many of their ministries. By now, the congregation had left Ukraine, which was much more hostile under Soviet rule than Poland, a very Catholic country. On September 17 1955, the Holy See approved the Albertine Sisters a congregation of pontifical right, moving them from under the authority of the Archbishop of Kraków to the direct authority of the Pope. Ten years later, the Holy See gave official approval of the Constitution of the Albertine Sisters.

=== Recent times ===
At the present time, the Albertine Sisters administer 69 foundations. Poland holds 53 of these, and the other 16 are distributed in Argentina, Bolivia, Italy, Russia (Siberia), the United States, Ukraine, and Vatican City.

=== Superior General ===
1. First Superior General: Blessed Sister Bernardina (1902–1940)
