= Leon Wyczółkowski =

Polish painter (1852–1936)

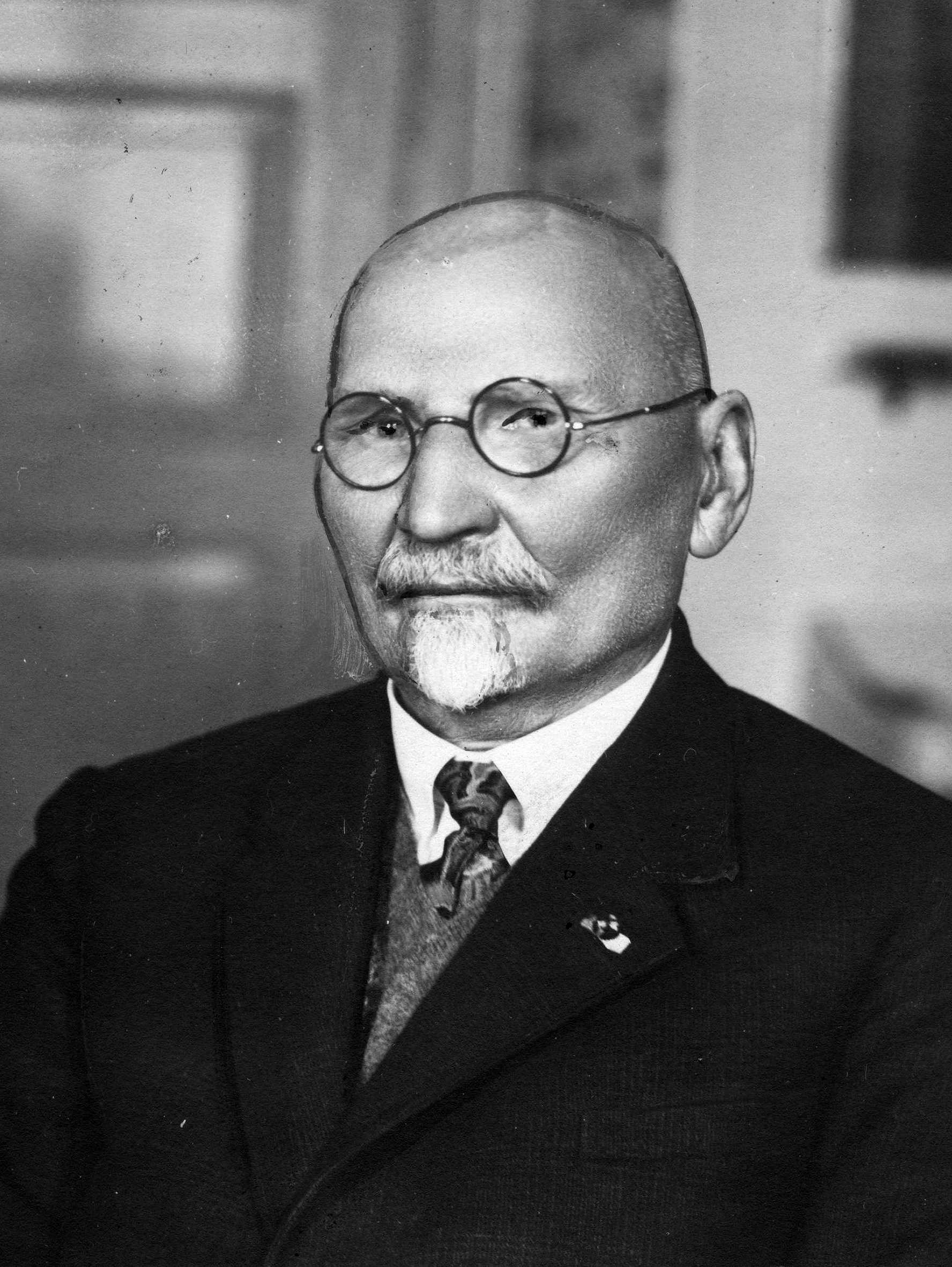
- Wyczółkowski in 1929
- Born: 11 April 1852; Huta Miastowska, Congress Poland, Russian Empire
- Died: 27 December 1936 (aged 84); Warsaw, Second Polish Republic
- Known for: Painting
- Movement: Realism; Impressionism

Leon Jan Wyczółkowski (Polish: [ˈlɛɔn vɨtʂuwˈkɔfskʲi]; 11 April 1852 – 27 December 1936) was a Polish painter and educator who was one of the leading painters of the Young Poland movement, as well as the principal representative of Polish Realism in art of the Interbellum. From 1895 to 1911 he served as professor at the Jan Matejko Academy of Fine Arts in Kraków, and from 1934, at the Warsaw Academy of Fine Arts. He was a founding member of the Society of Polish Artists "Sztuka" (Art, 1897).

== Work ==
Wyczółkowski was born in Huta Miastowska near Garwolin in Congress Poland. At first, in his artistic experience he aimed at devoting himself to the genre of historical painting with documentary realism in the detail. After his trip to Paris though, he changed his focus and began implementing solutions typical of the French Impressionists. He painted dramatic landscapes, nudes, and pastoral scenes with impasto and impressionist lighting effects (e.g., "Paddling Fishermen"). For a short while he came under the influence of Symbolism (e.g., "Fossilized Druid"), and around 1900 darkened his palette. His work is characterized by a richness of form and complex technical means. Thanks to a friendship with Feliks Jasieński (also called Manggha), he expanded his interests to include oriental scenes as well. Wyczółkowski was a master of flower arrangements and still life. He portrayed almost the entire art world of Kraków.

Wyczółkowski died 1936 in Warsaw. After the war, on the anniversary of his birthday (11 April 1946), the District Museum in Bydgoszcz took up his name in recognition of his outstanding achievements. His widow donated to the museum many of his works and belongings. The Bydgoszcz Museum owns one of the largest collections of Leon Wyczółkowski's paintings, drawings and graphics in Poland. The collection is complemented with numerous documents, a rich photographic archive, personal memorabilia, artistic workshop, and other original items from his mansion in Gościeradz. The collection, organized into a new department, consists of over 700 works of Leon Wyczółkowski. His most representative impressionist paintings can be found at the National Museum in Kraków, the National Museum in Warsaw, and at the Bydgoszcz Museum.

== Selected works ==
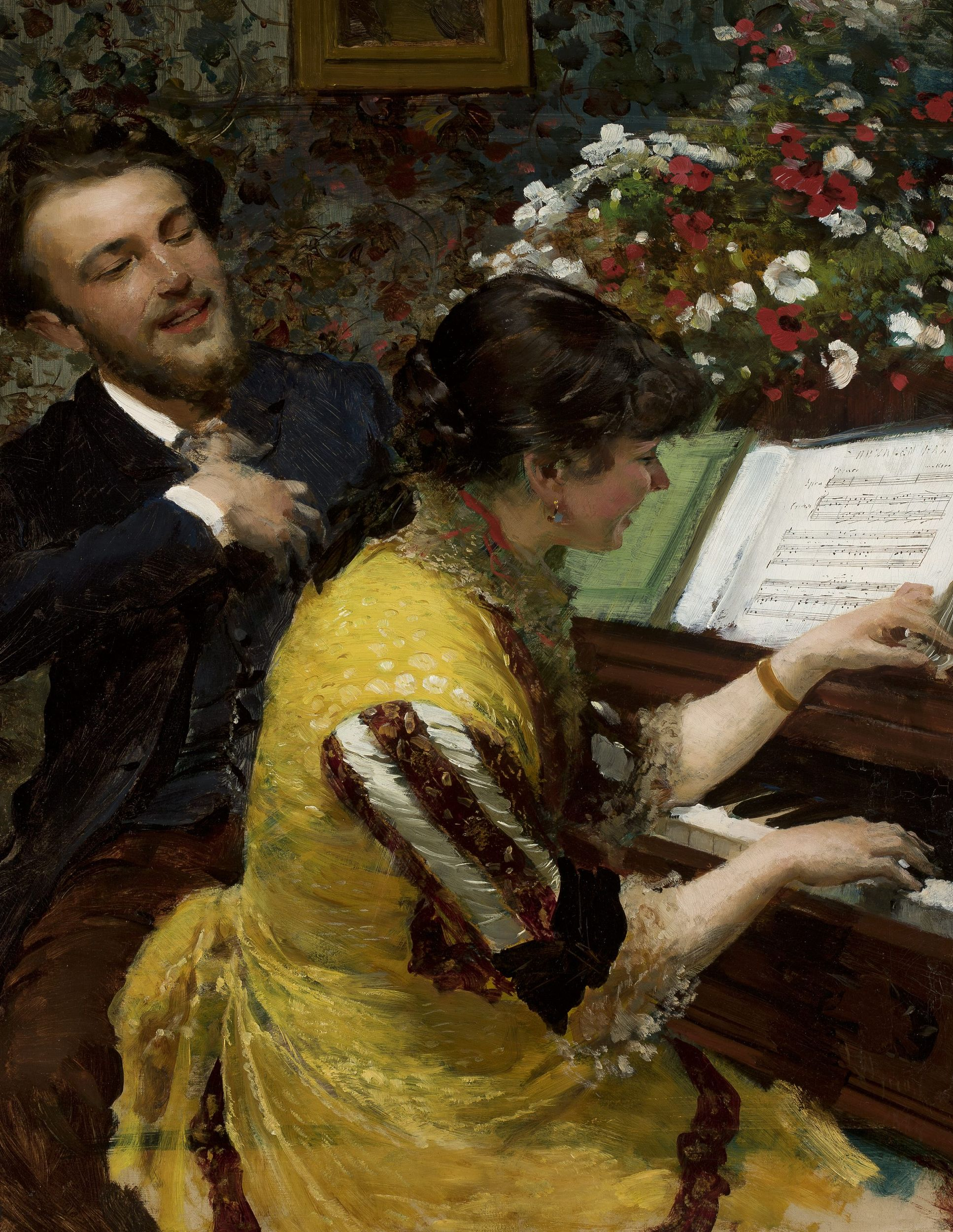
I have seen once - scene by the piano, 1884, National Museum in Warsaw

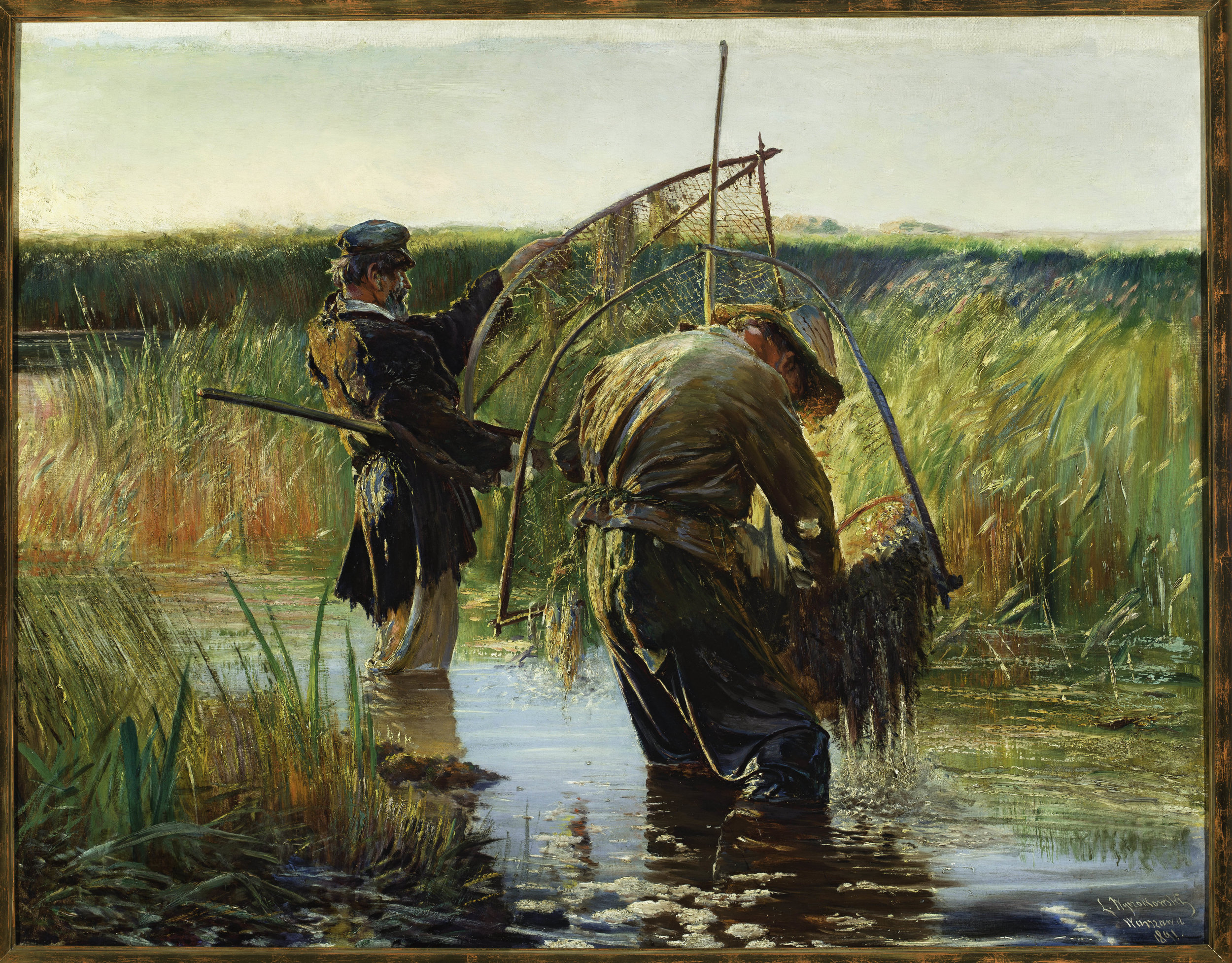
Fishermen, 1891, National Museum in Warsaw

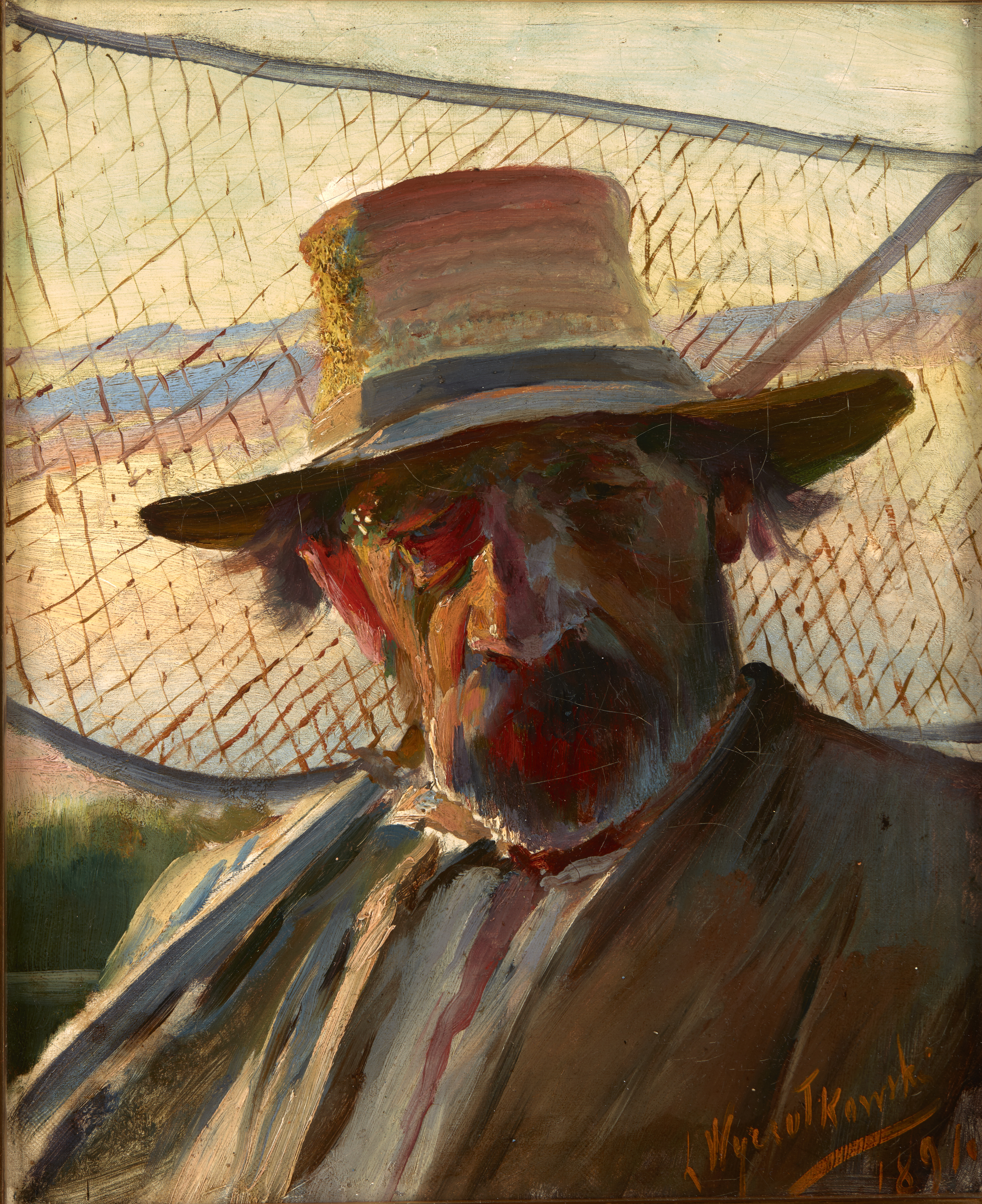
Fisherman with a Net 1891, National Museum in Kraków

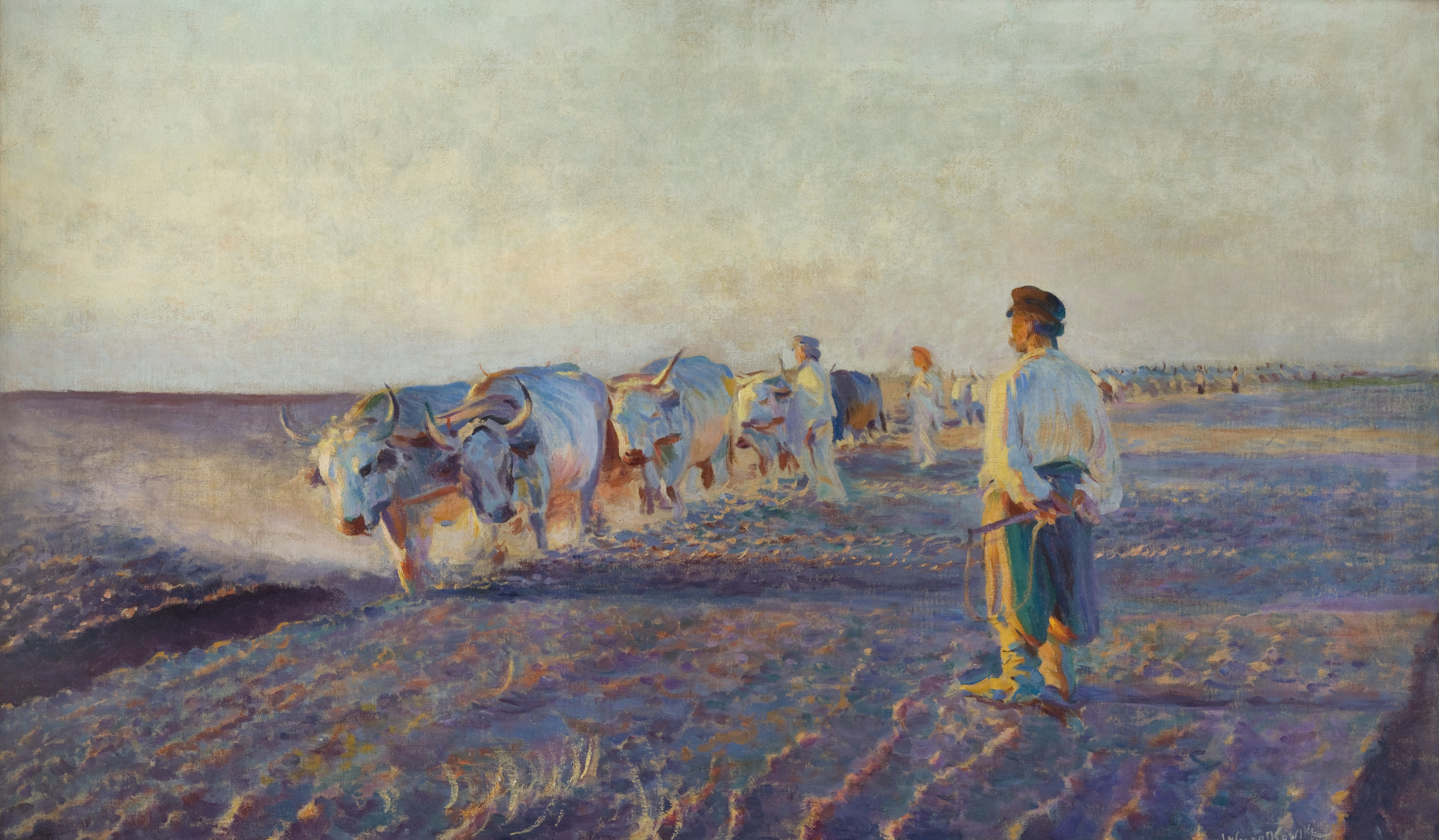
Plowing in the Ukraine, 1892, National Museum in Kraków

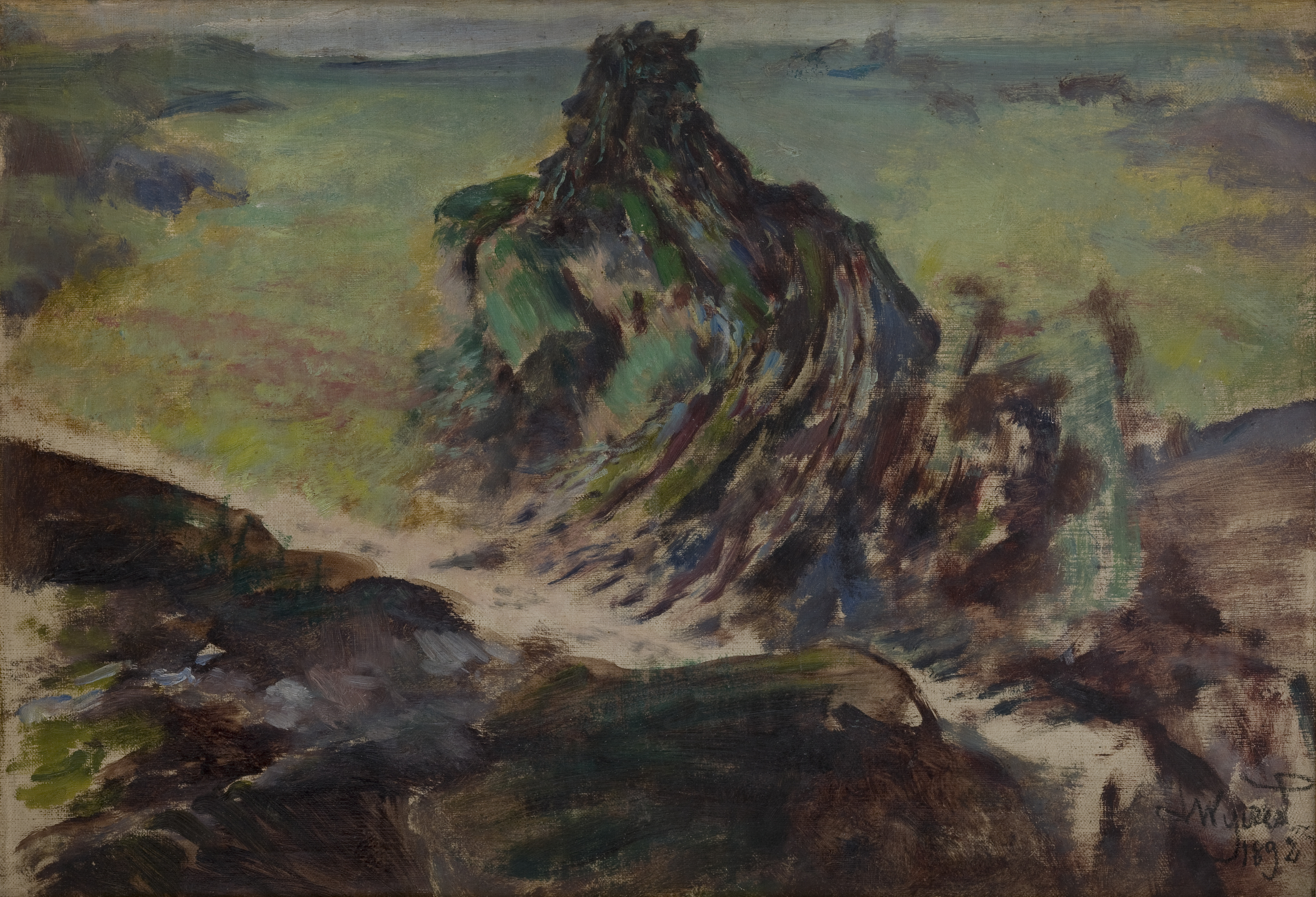
Petrified Druid, 1892, National Museum in Kraków

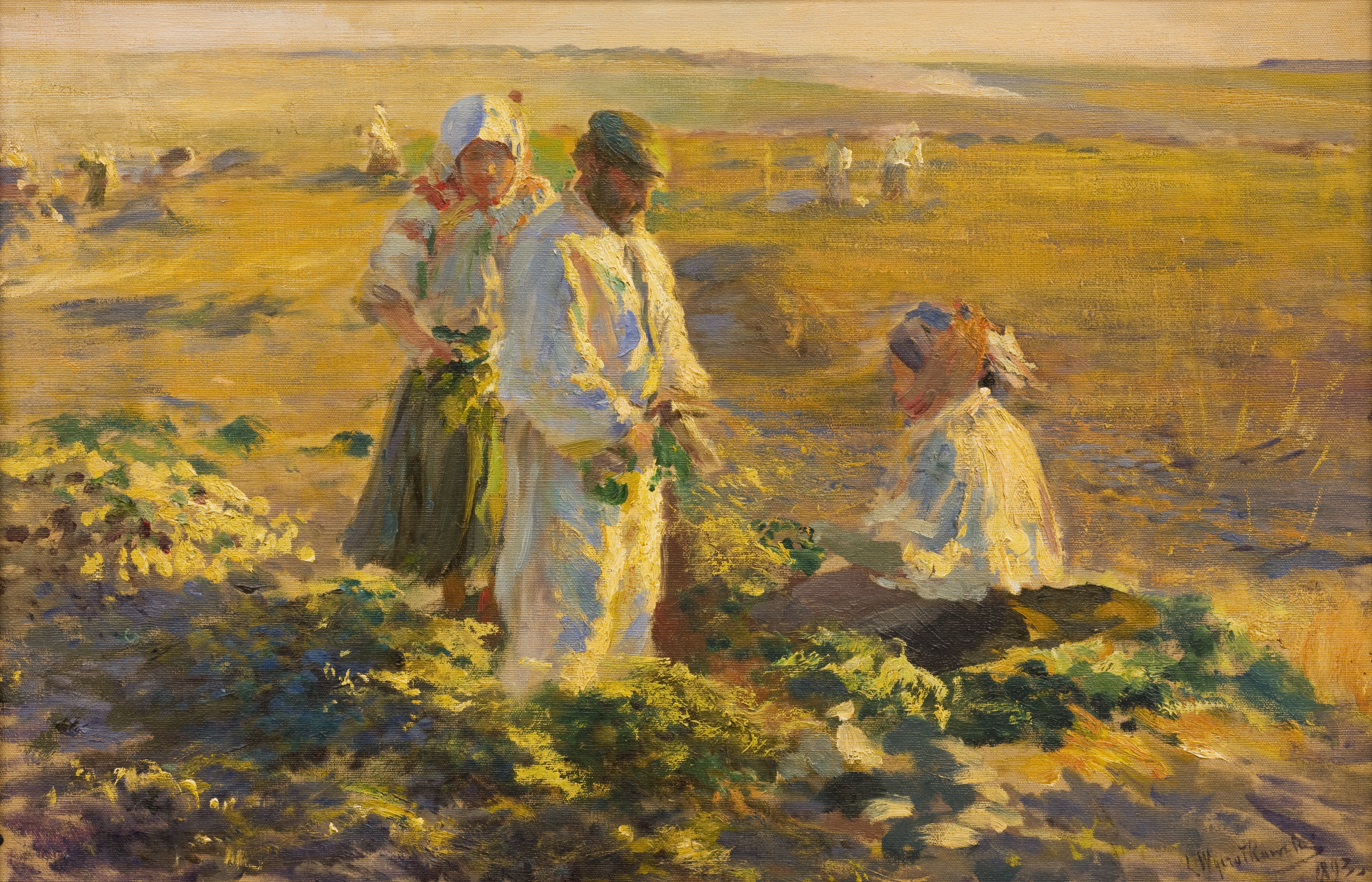
Beet-Lifting, 1893, National Museum in Kraków

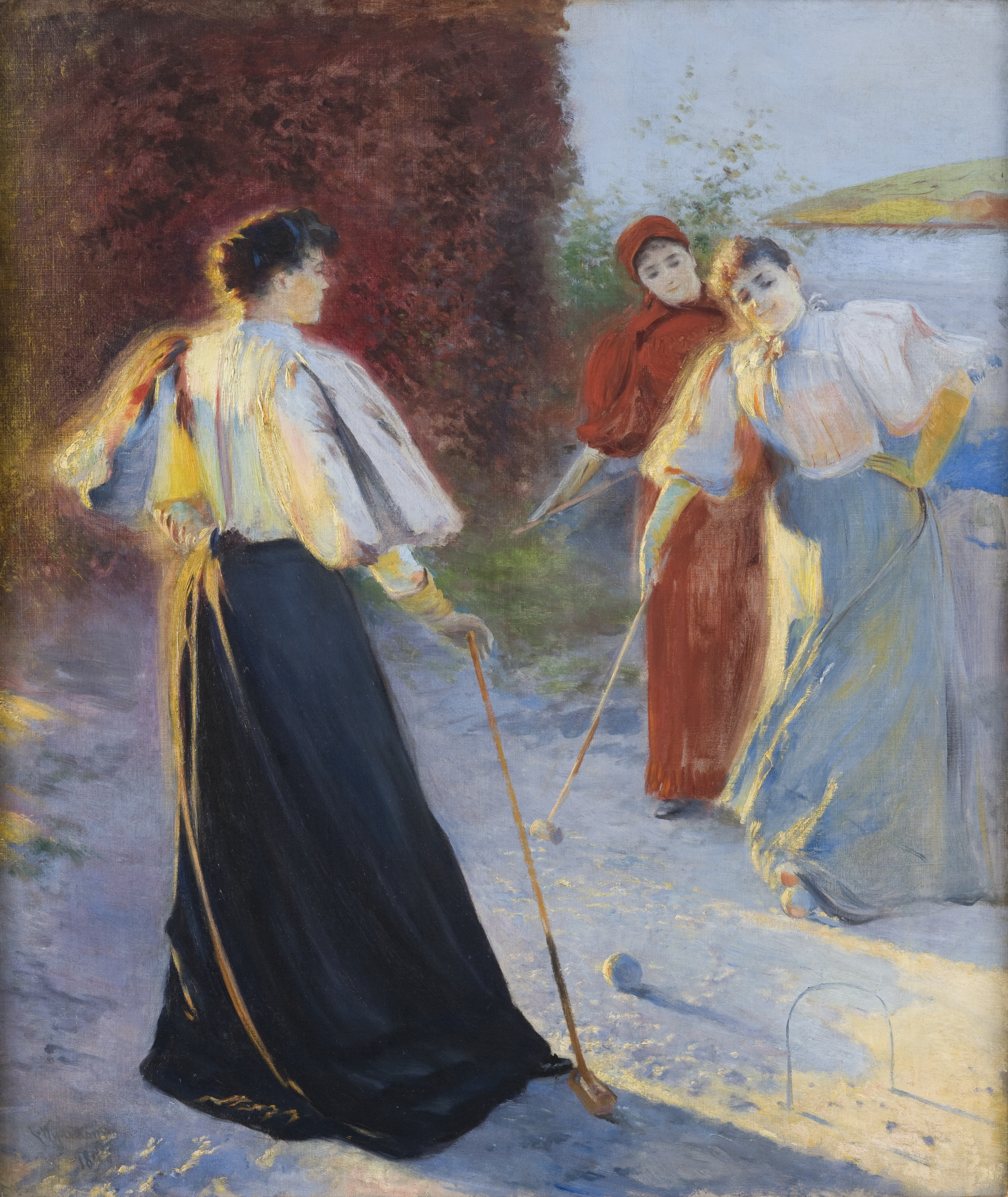
A Game of Crocquet, 1895, National Museum in Kraków

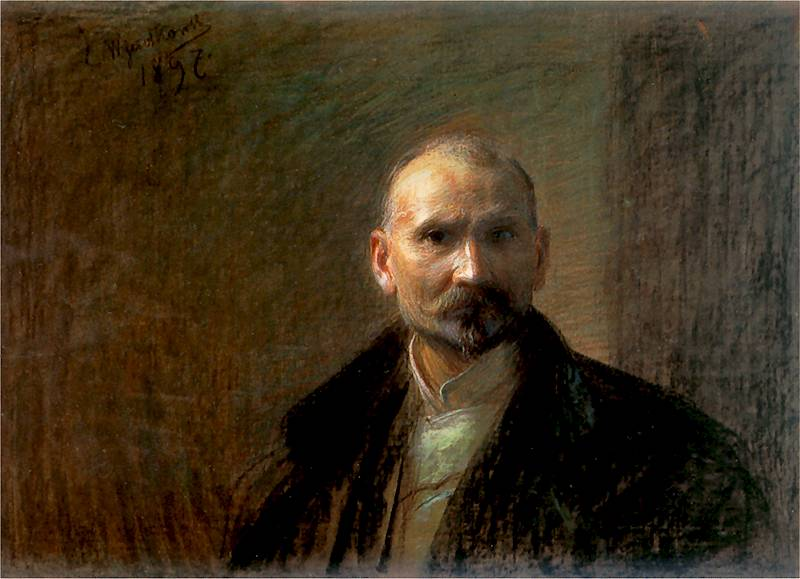
Self-Portrait at the Studio, 1897, National Museum in Kraków

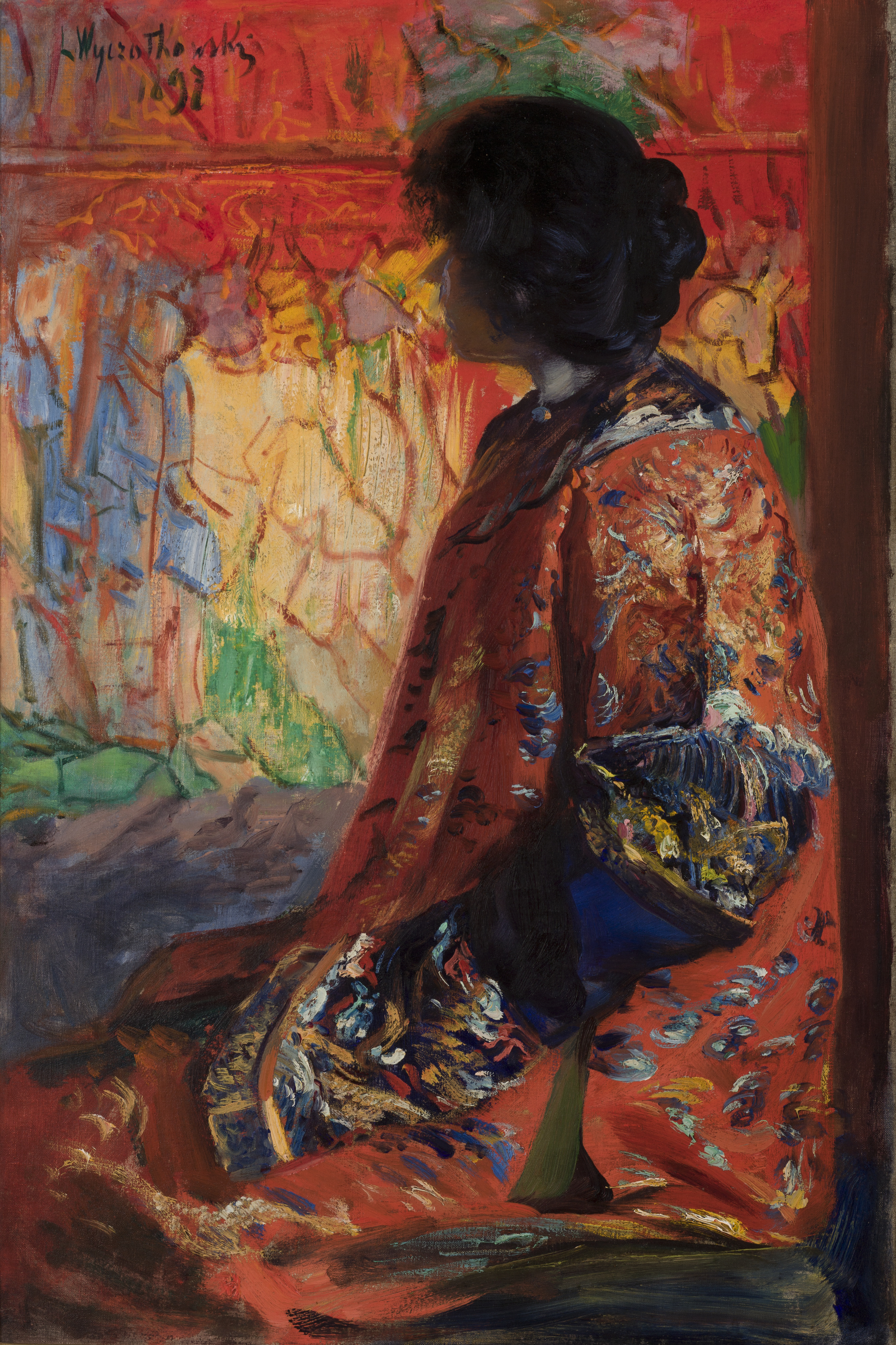
Japanese Woman, 1897, National Museum in Kraków

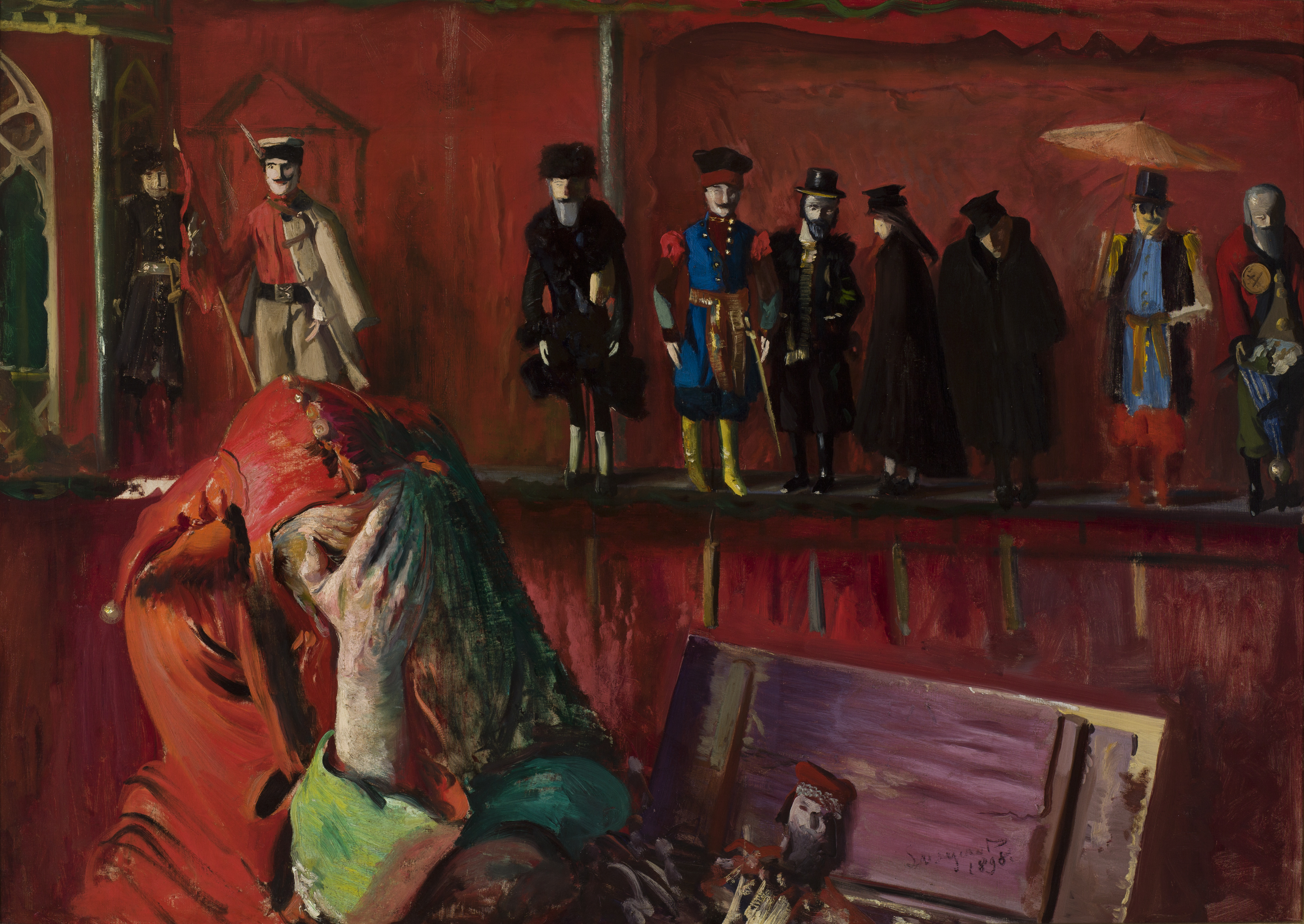
Stańczyk, 1898, National Museum in Kraków

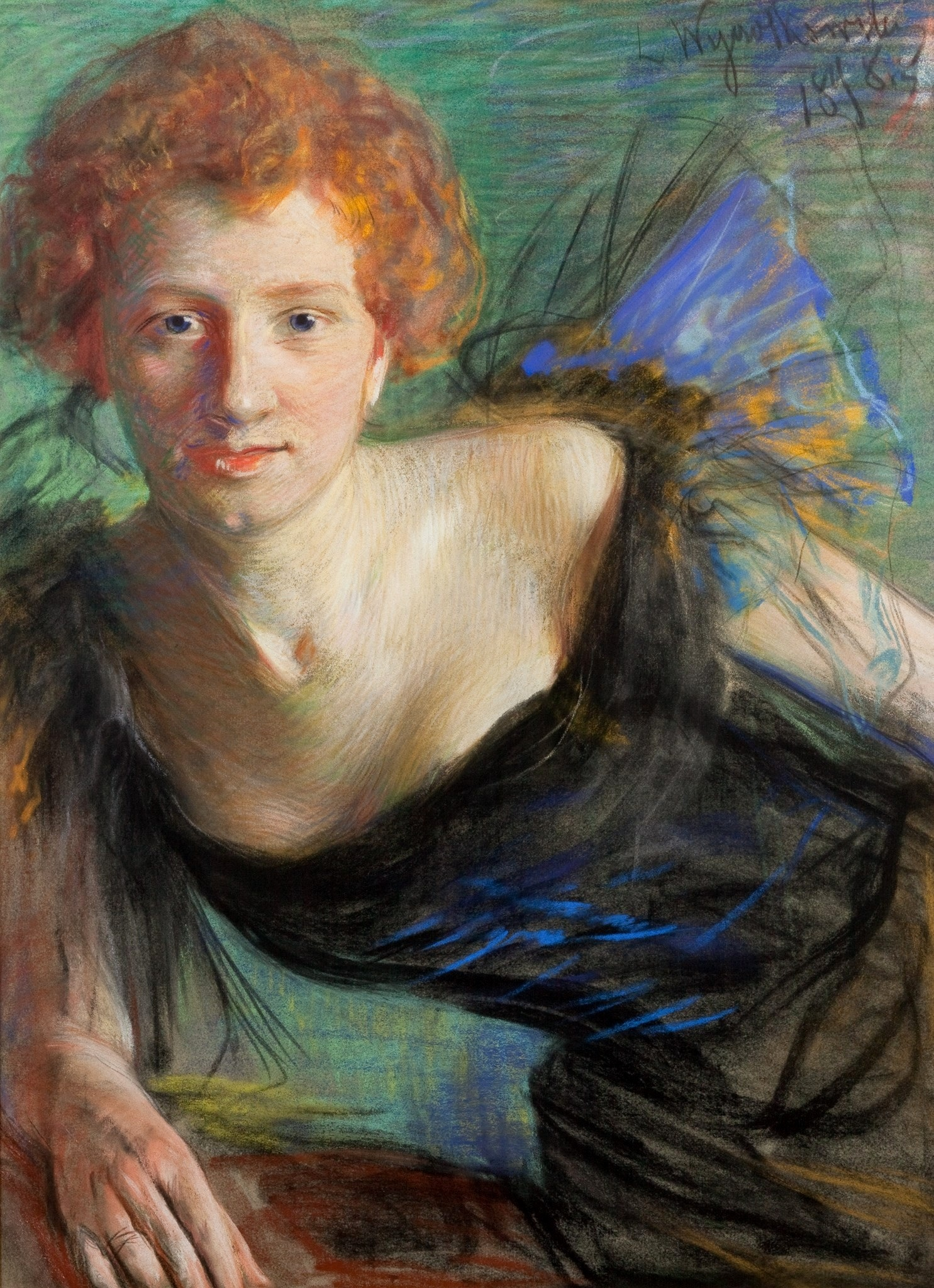
Irena Solska, 1899, National Museum in Kraków

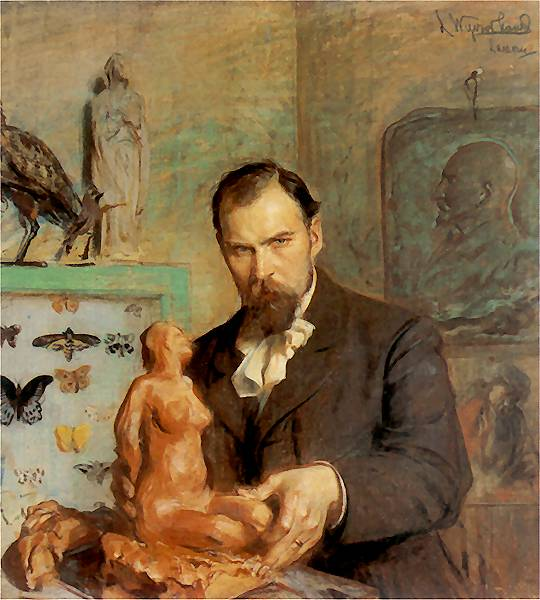
Portrait of Konstanty Laszczka, 1901–1902, Jan Matejko Academy of Fine Arts

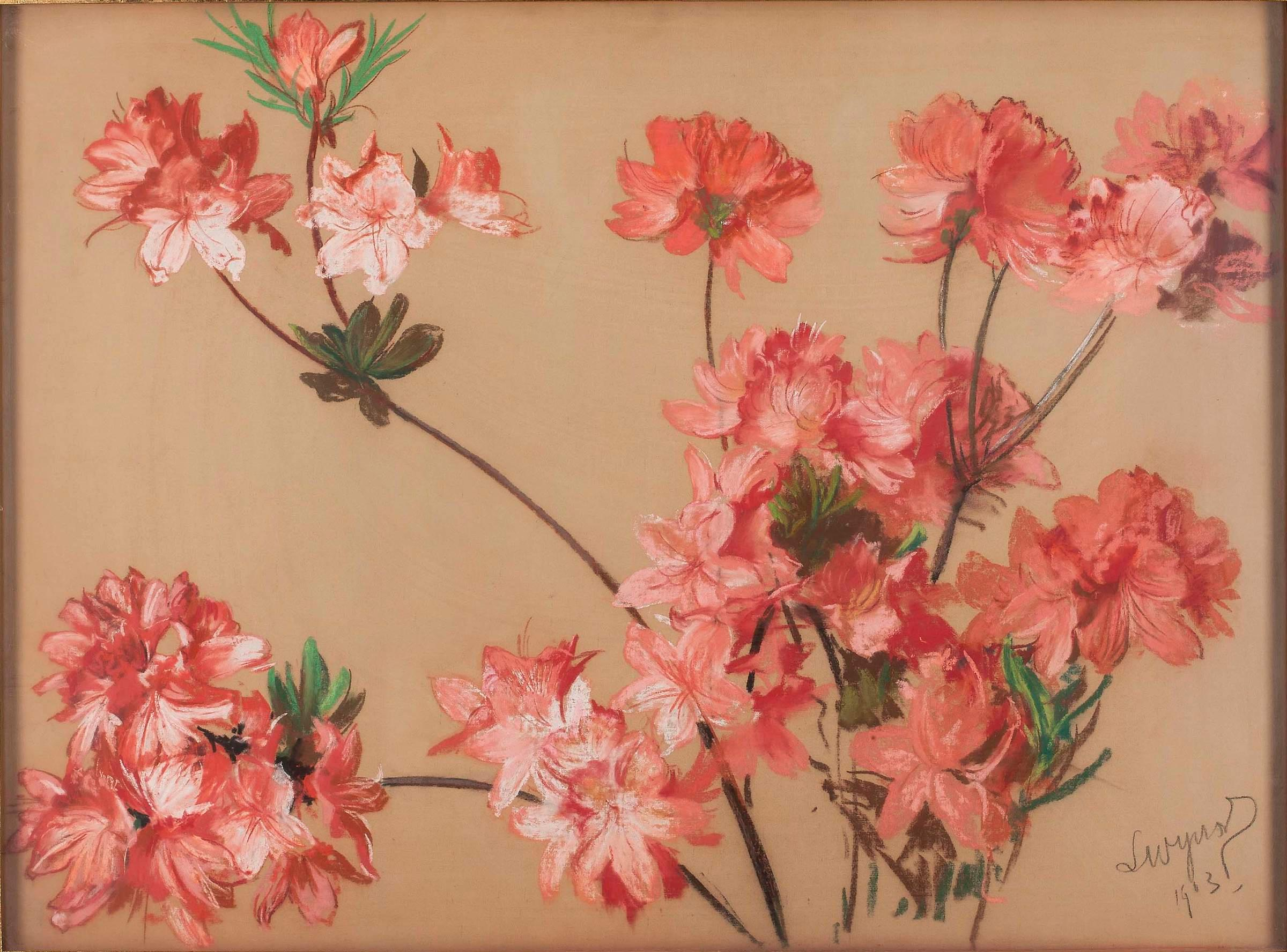
Pink Azaleas, pastel on canvas, 1903, National Museum in Warsaw

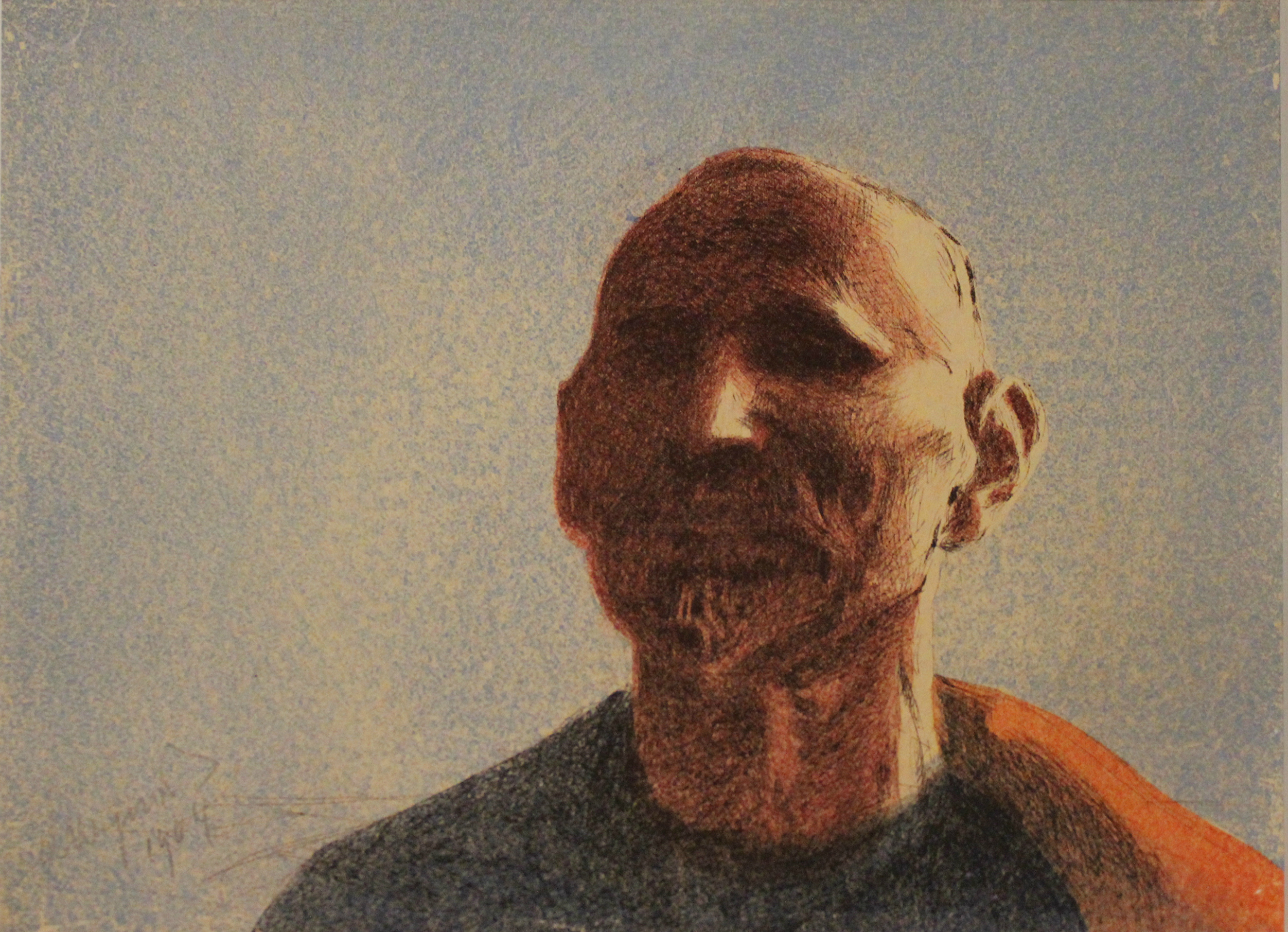
Self-Portrait, colour hydrogen fluoride etching, paper, 1904, National Museum in Warsaw

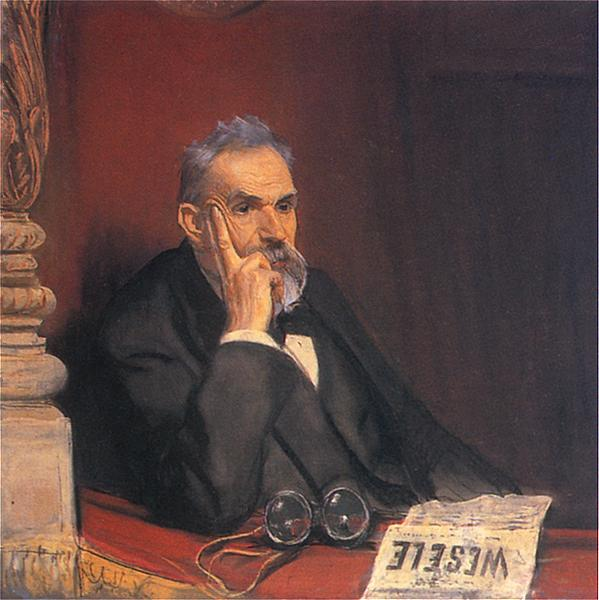
Portrait of Karol Estreicher, 1905, Jagiellonian University Museum

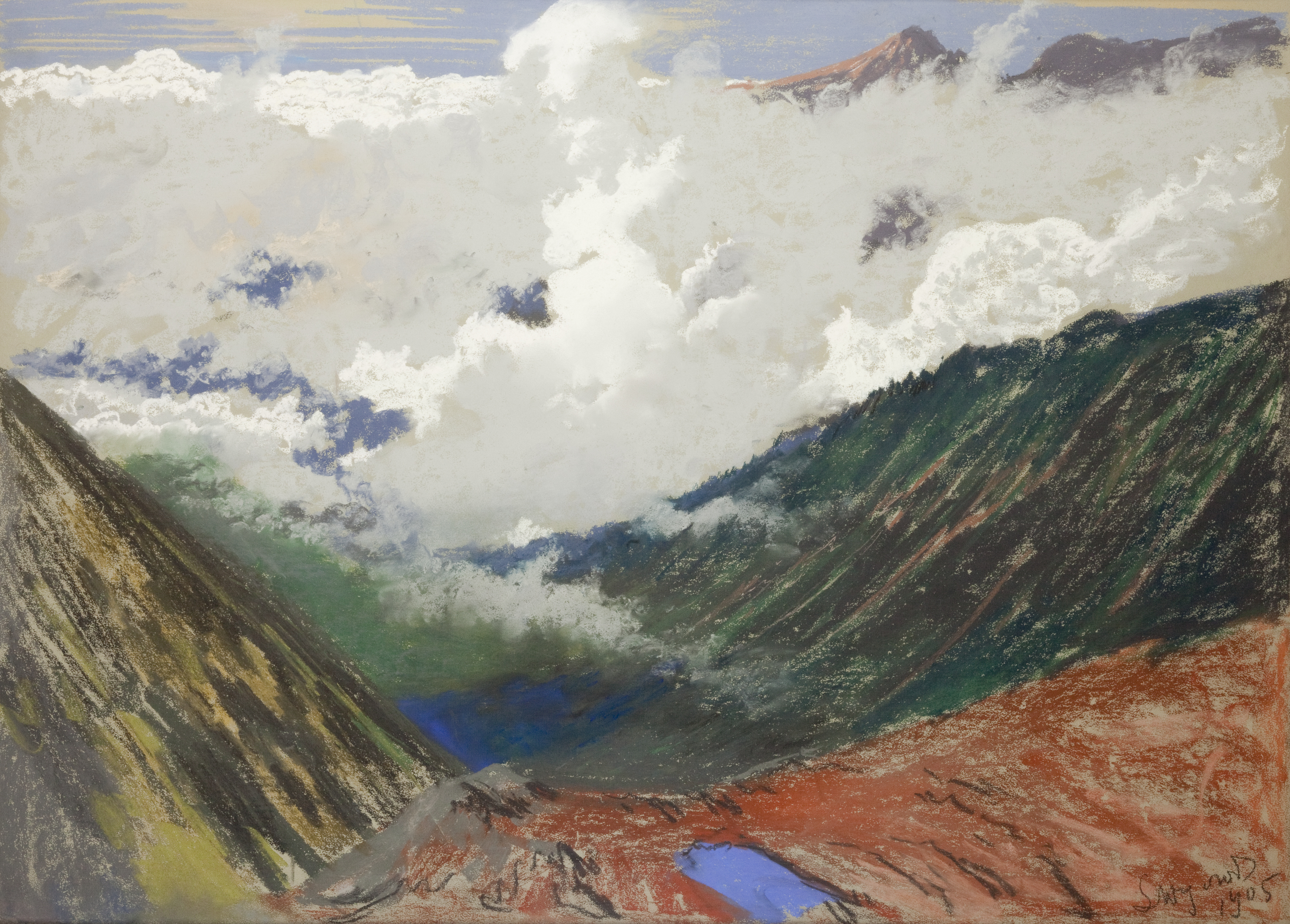
U Wrót Chałubińskiego, 1905, National Museum in Kraków

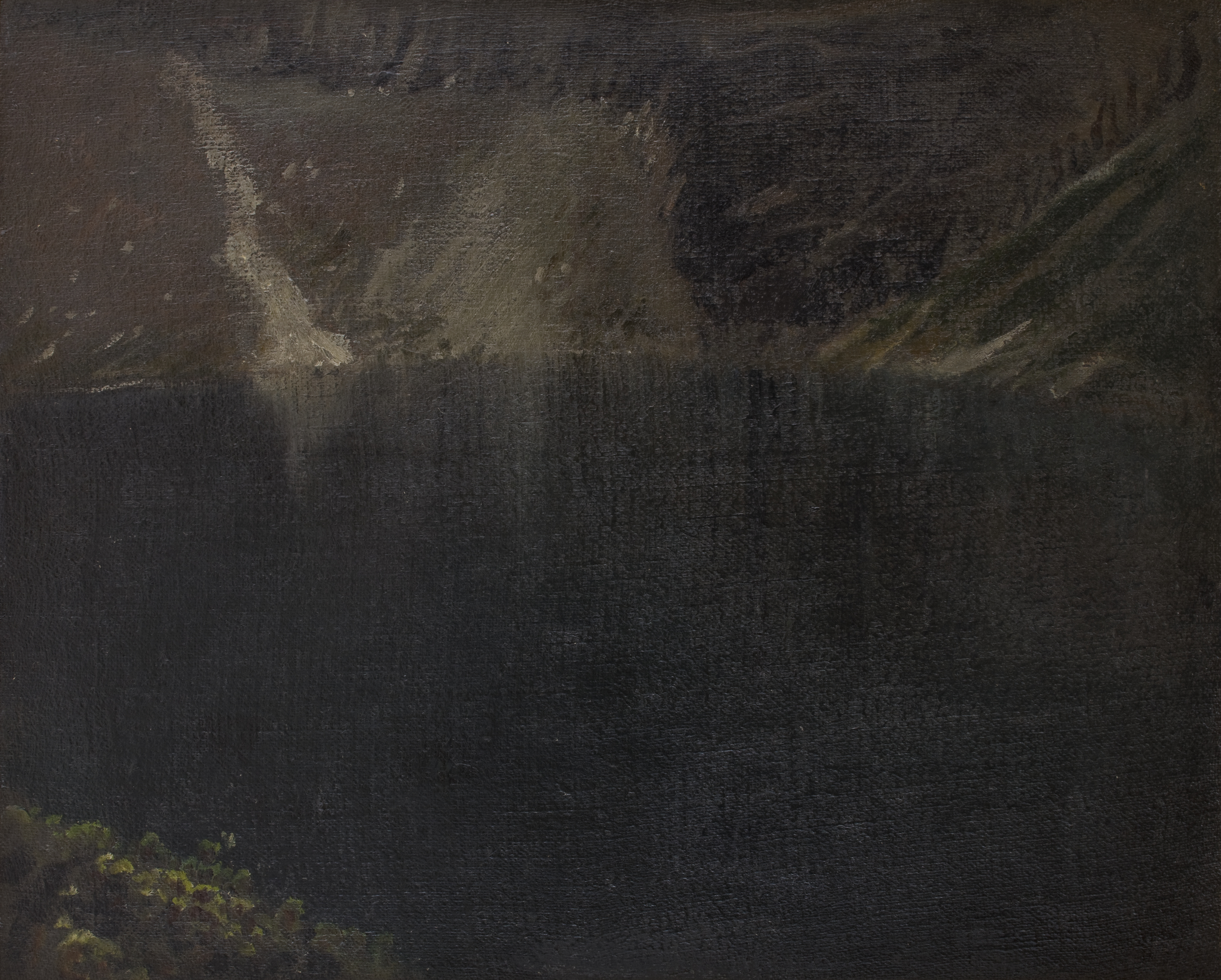
Black Lake, 1906, National Museum in Kraków

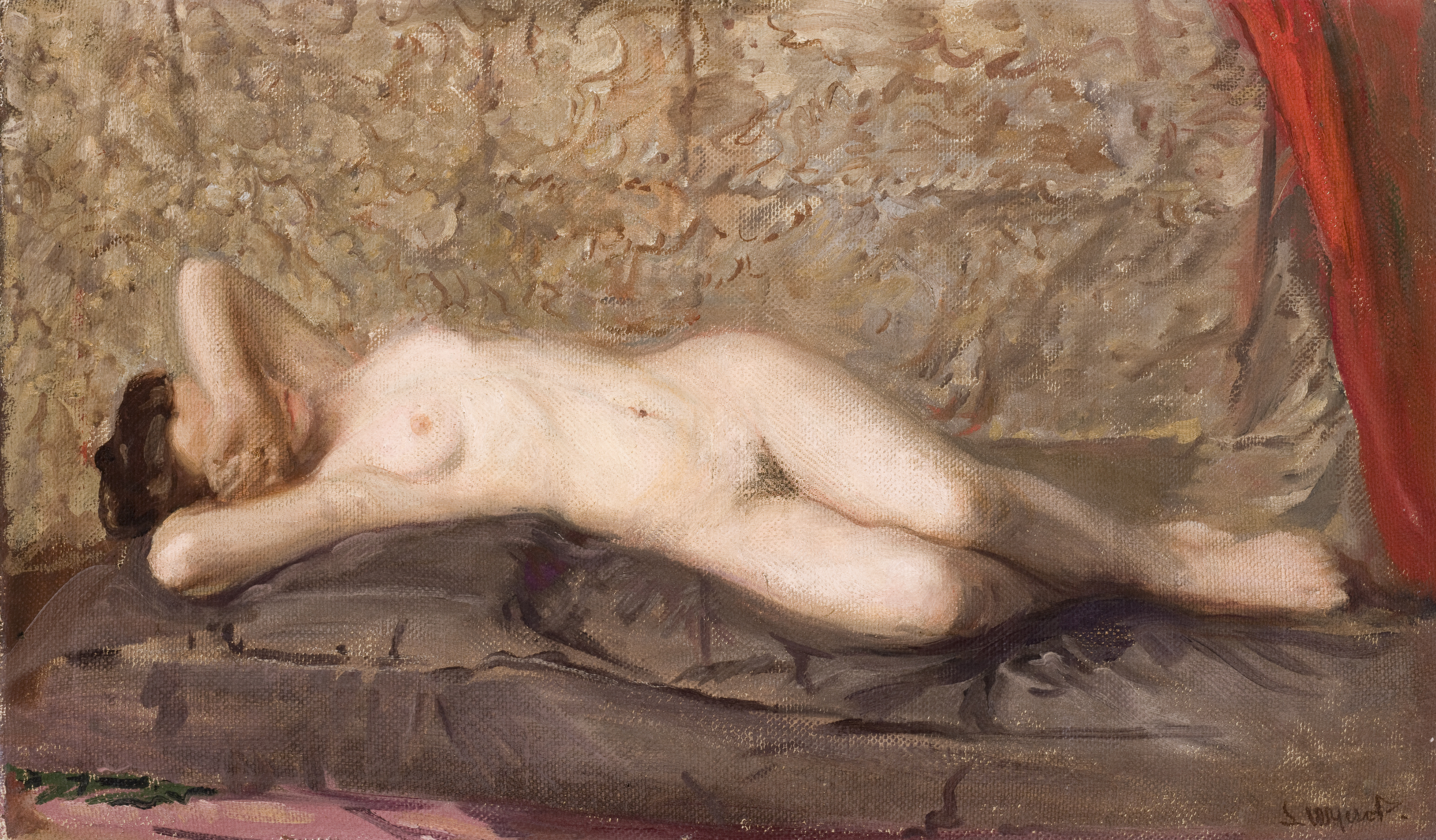
Nude, oil on canvas, 1908, National Museum in Kraków

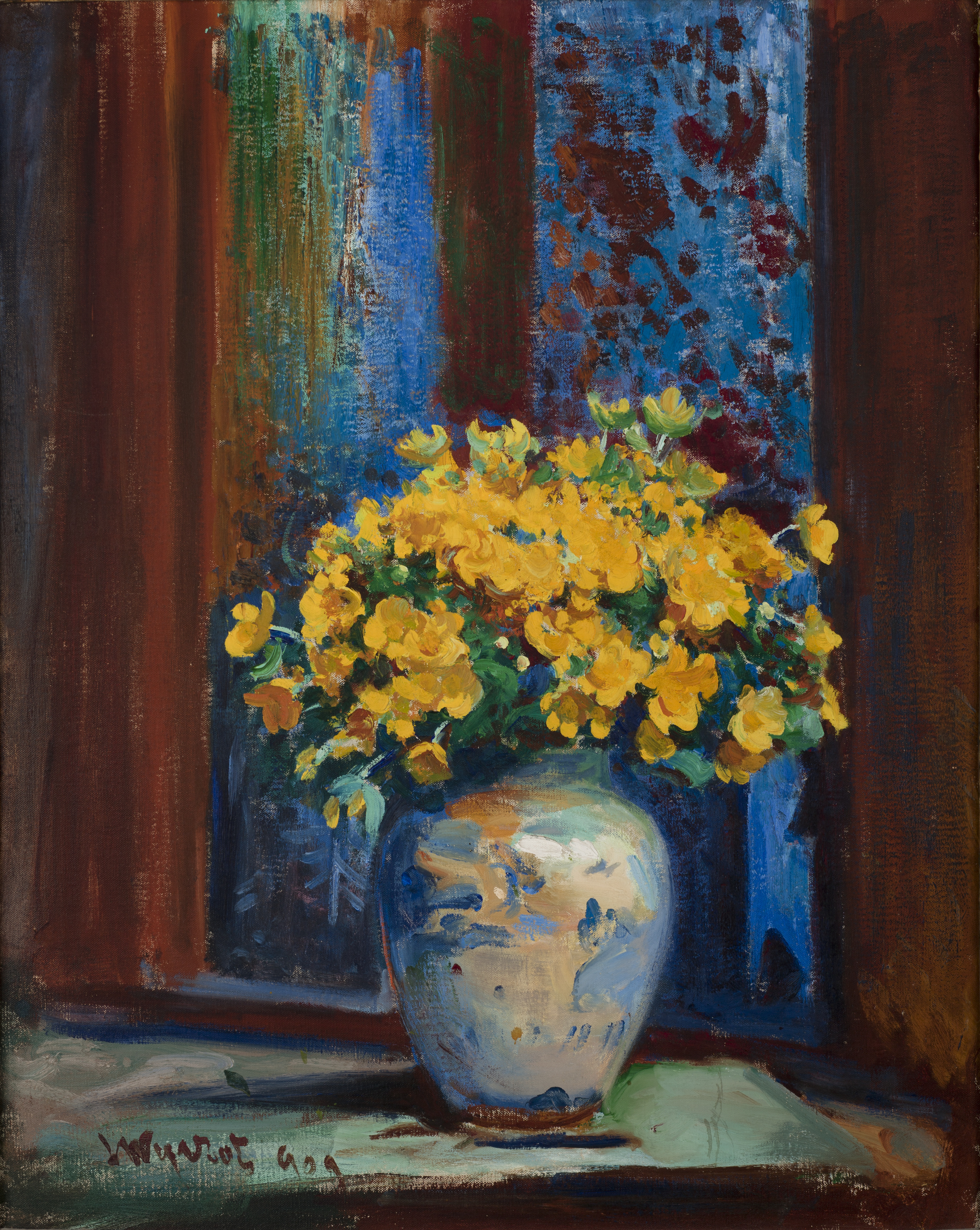
Marsh Marigolds, 1909, National Museum in Kraków

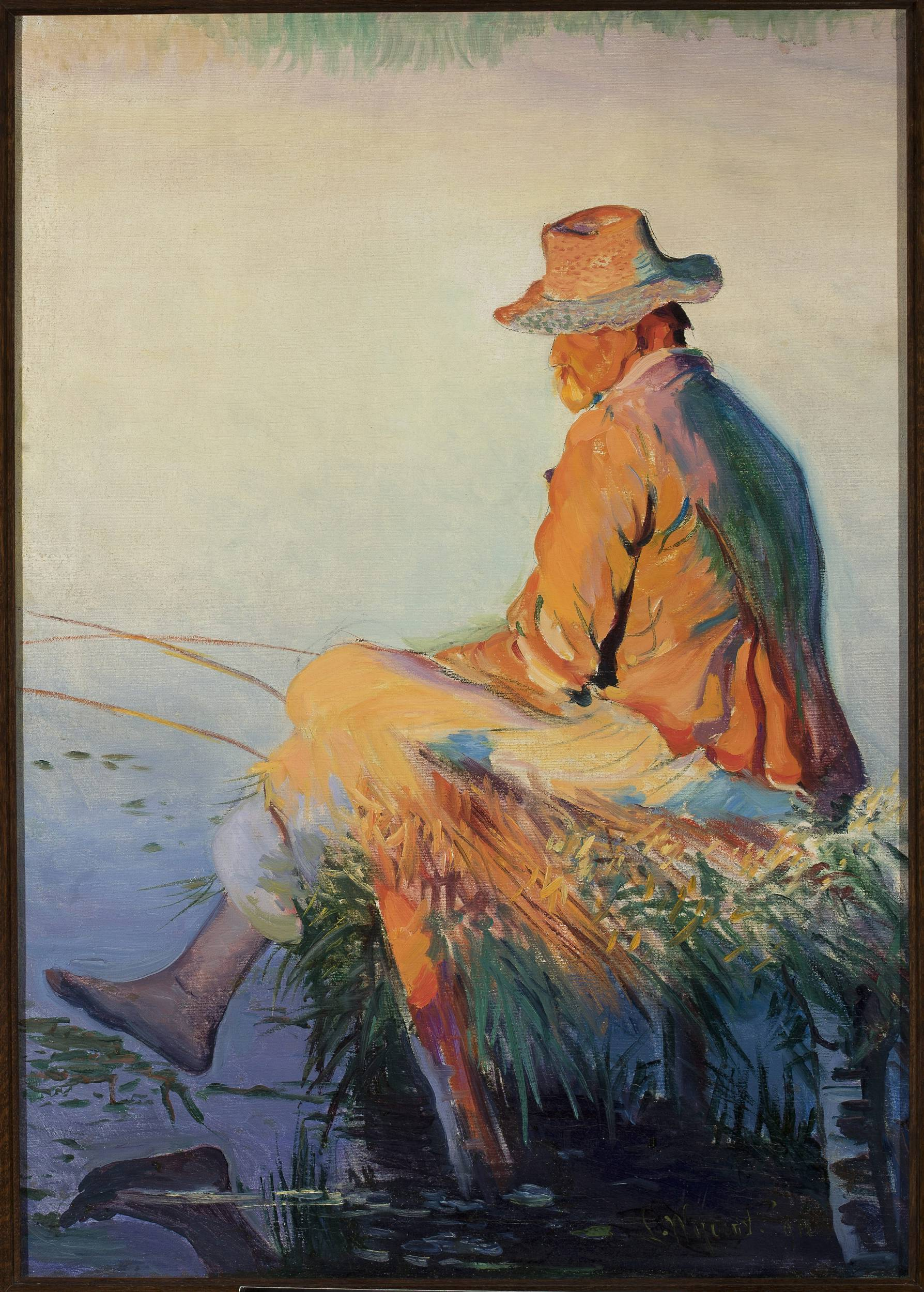
Fisherman, 1911, National Museum in Warsaw

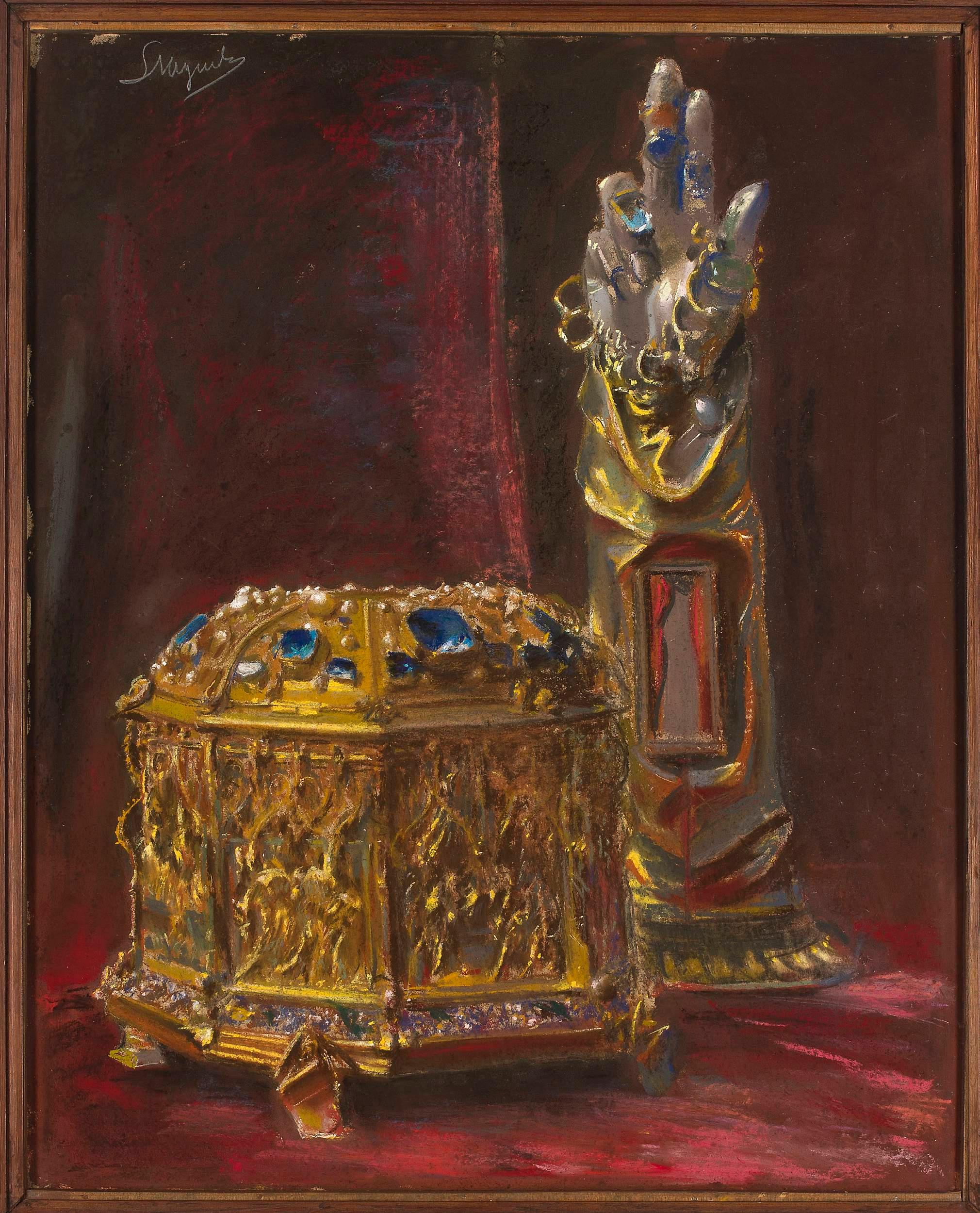
Skarbiec wawelski cycle, 1907, National Museum in Warsaw

== See also ==
- List of Polish painters
