= Igołomia =

- Village
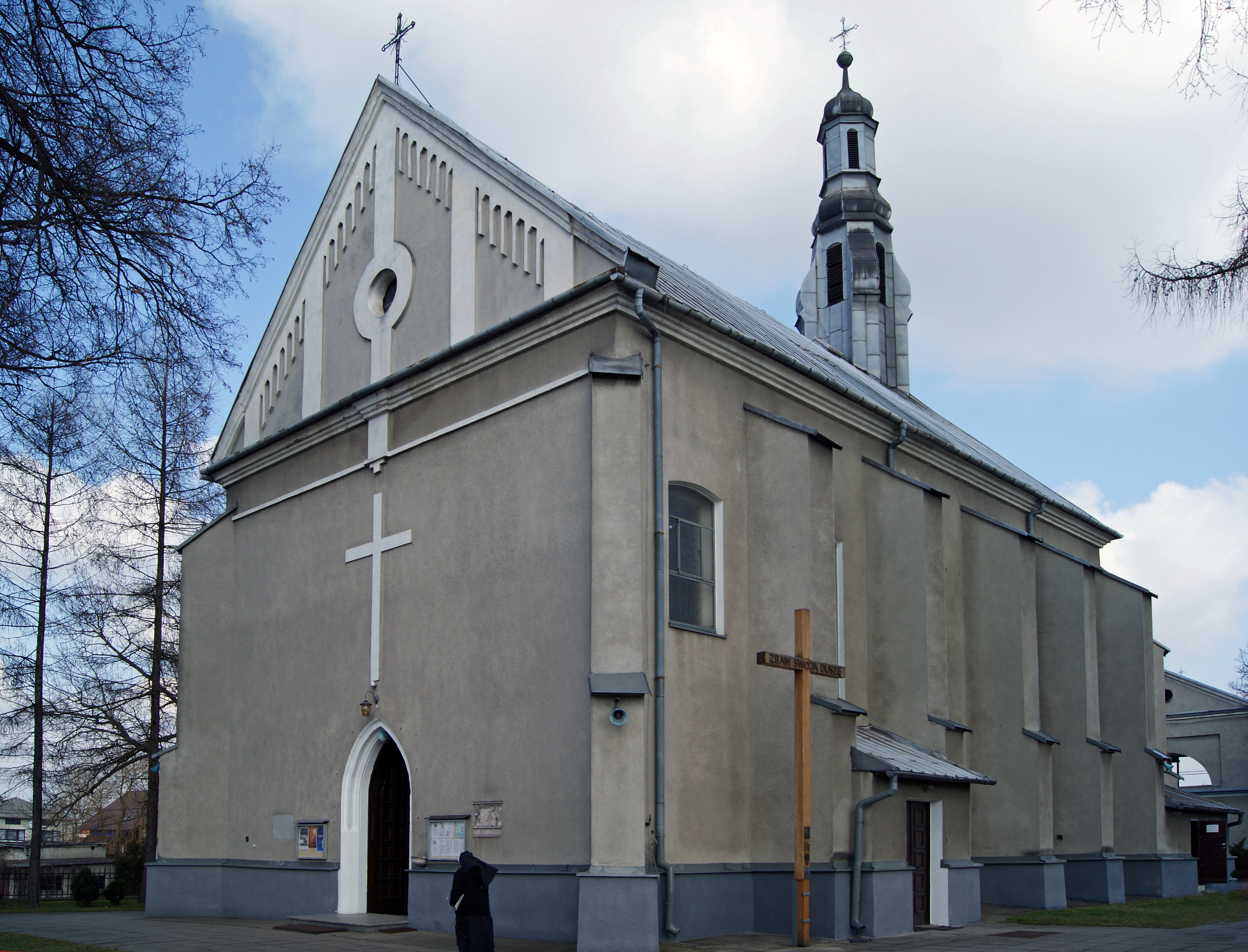
- Church of the Nativity of the Virgin Mary

- Location within Poland
- Coordinates: 50°5′20″N 20°14′22″E
- Country: Poland
- Voivodeship: Lesser Poland
- County: Kraków
- Gmina: Igołomia-Wawrzeńczyce

Population
  - Total: 1,100

Igołomia [iɡɔˈwɔmja] is a village in the administrative district of Gmina Igołomia-Wawrzeńczyce, within Kraków County, Lesser Poland Voivodeship, in southern Poland.

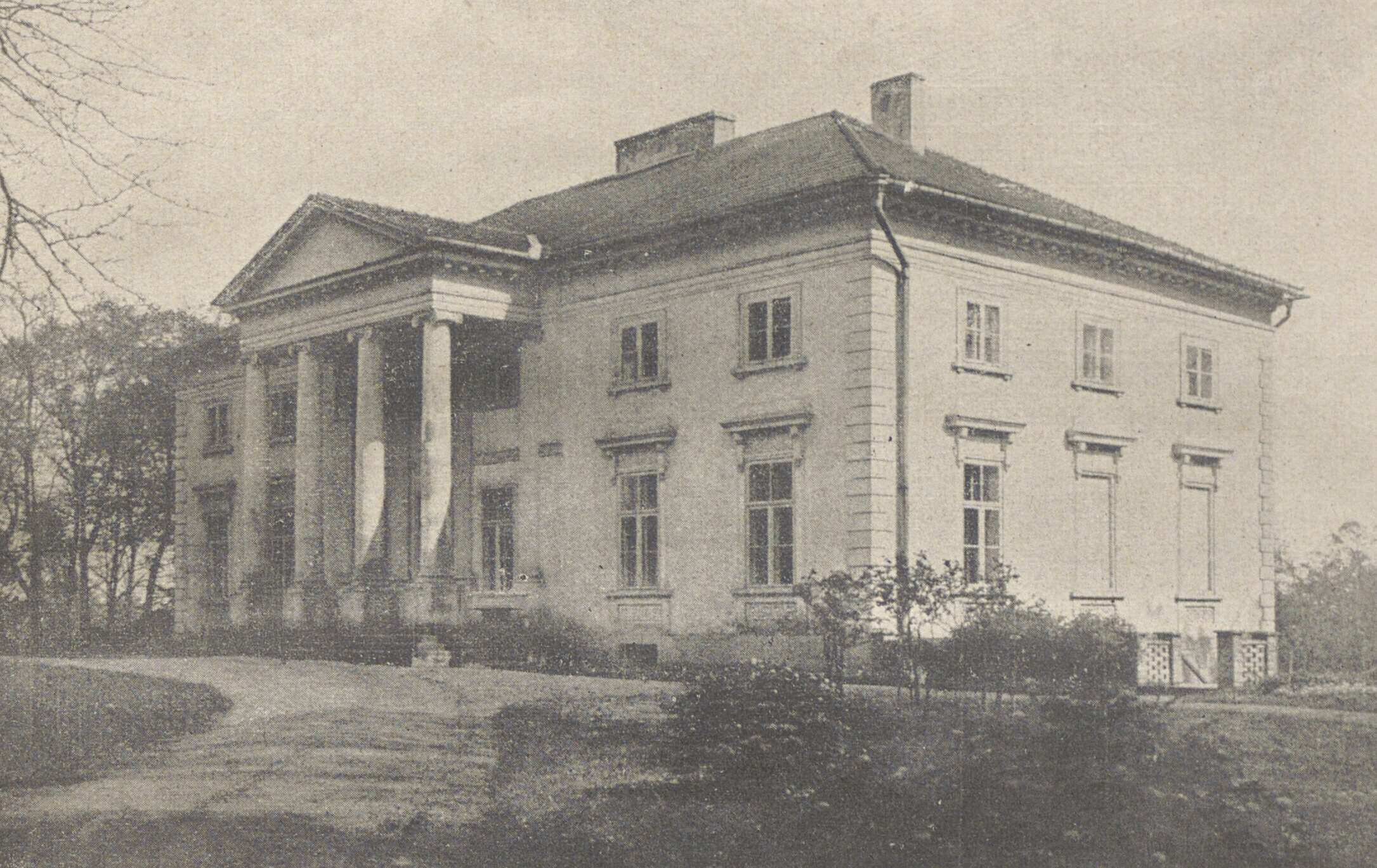
Palace in Igołomia before 1925

== Notable people ==
- Albert Chmielowski, painter, Catholic Saint
- Wincenty Wodzinowski, painter
