= Bernardyna Maria Jabłońska =

Polish Roman Catholic professed religious

Blessed Maria Jabłońska
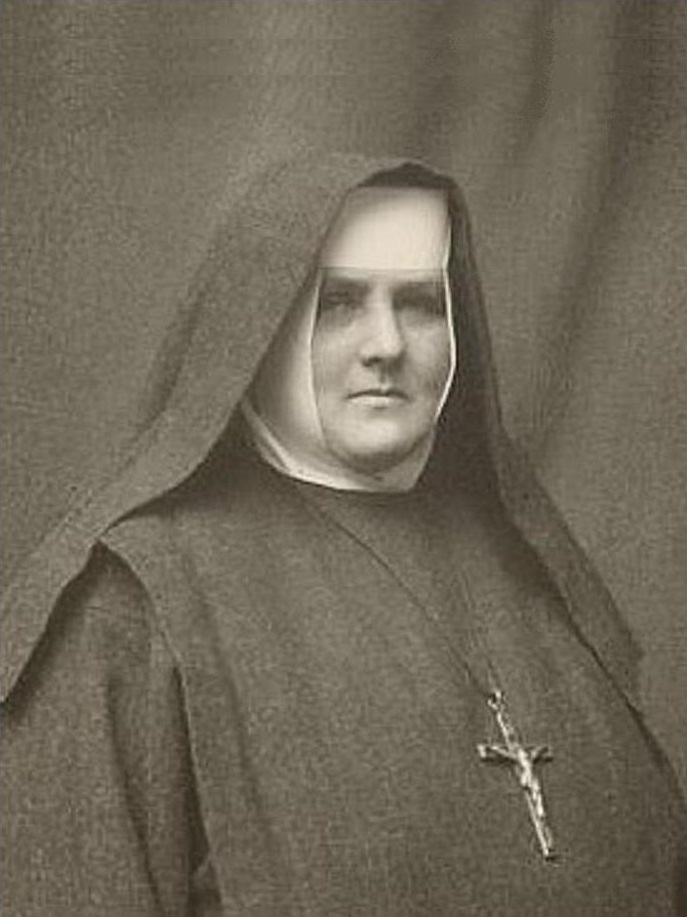

Religious
- Born: 13 June 1878; Pizuny, Galicia, Austria-Hungary
- Died: 23 September 1940 (aged 62); Kraków, General Government
- Venerated in: Roman Catholic Church
- Beatified: 6 June 1997, Zakopane, Poland by Pope John Paul II
- Feast: 23 September
- Attributes: Religious habit
- Patronage: Sisters Servants of the Poor

Maria Jabłońska (13 June 1878 – 23 September 1940) - in religious Bernardyna - was a Polish Roman Catholic professed religious and the co-founder of the Sisters Servants of the Poor (1891) that she founded alongside Albert Chmielowski.

Her beatification was celebrated on 6 June 1997 in Poland.

== Life ==
Maria Jabłońska was born on 13 June 1878 as one of four children to Grzegorz and Maria Jabłońska; she was baptized that same month. Her mother died suddenly in 1893. She received her education from a private tutor but her strong-willed nature made it hard for the tutor to control her so he resigned. She fostered an intense devotion for the Mother of God as a child.

Both Jabłońska and Chmielowski co-founded the Albertine Sisters on 15 January 1891 and he appointed her on 7 April 1902 as its Superior General - this was a post that she retained until her death. She made her solemn profession as a nun on 6 March 1897. Jabłońska dedicated her life to aid the poor and those who suffered which was something that intensified following her mother's death; she had become a nun despite the defiance of her protective father.

Jabłońska died on 23 September 1940.

== Beatification ==
The beatification process opened on 17 February 1984 after the Congregation for the Causes of Saints issued the official "nihil obstat" to the cause and titled her as a Servant of God; Cardinal Franciszek Macharski oversaw the diocesan process from 26 May 1984 to April 1986 and the C.C.S. later validated this process on 30 January 1987 before receiving the Positio in 1992. Theologians approved the cause on 26 April 1996 as did the C.C.S. on 15 October 1996; Pope John Paul II confirmed her heroic virtue and named her as Venerable on 17 December 1996.

The miracle for beatification was investigated and then validated on 30 January 1987; a medical board approved it on 20 November 1996 as did theologians on 7 February 1997 and the C.C.S. on 4 March 1997. John Paul II approved this healing to be a legitimate miracle on 8 March 1997 and then beatified the late nun on 6 June 1997 while on the occasion of his apostolic visitation to Poland.

The current postulator for this cause is Sister Renata Władysława Bobrowska.
