= Christ Crowned with Thorns =

Christ Crowned with Thorns may refer to:

- Christ Crowned with Thorns (Annibale Carracci), a 1598-1600 painting by Annibale Carracci
- Christ Crowned with Thorns (Bosch, London), a painting created after 1485 by Hieronymous Bosch
- Christ Crowned with Thorns (Bosch, El Escorial), a 1530s painting by a follower of Hieronymus Bosch
- Christ Crowned with Thorns (Bouts), a 1500 painting by Albrecht Bouts
- Christ Crowned with Thorns (Guercino), a 1647 painting by Guercino
- Christ Crowned with Thorns (Heemskerck), c. 1550 painting by Maarten van Heemskerck

== See also ==
- Crown of thorns
- The Crowning with Thorns (disambiguation)
