= 1647 in art =

Events from the year 1647 in art.

== Events ==
- Gianlorenzo Bernini begins work on his Memorial to Maria Raggi.

== Works ==
=== Paintings ===
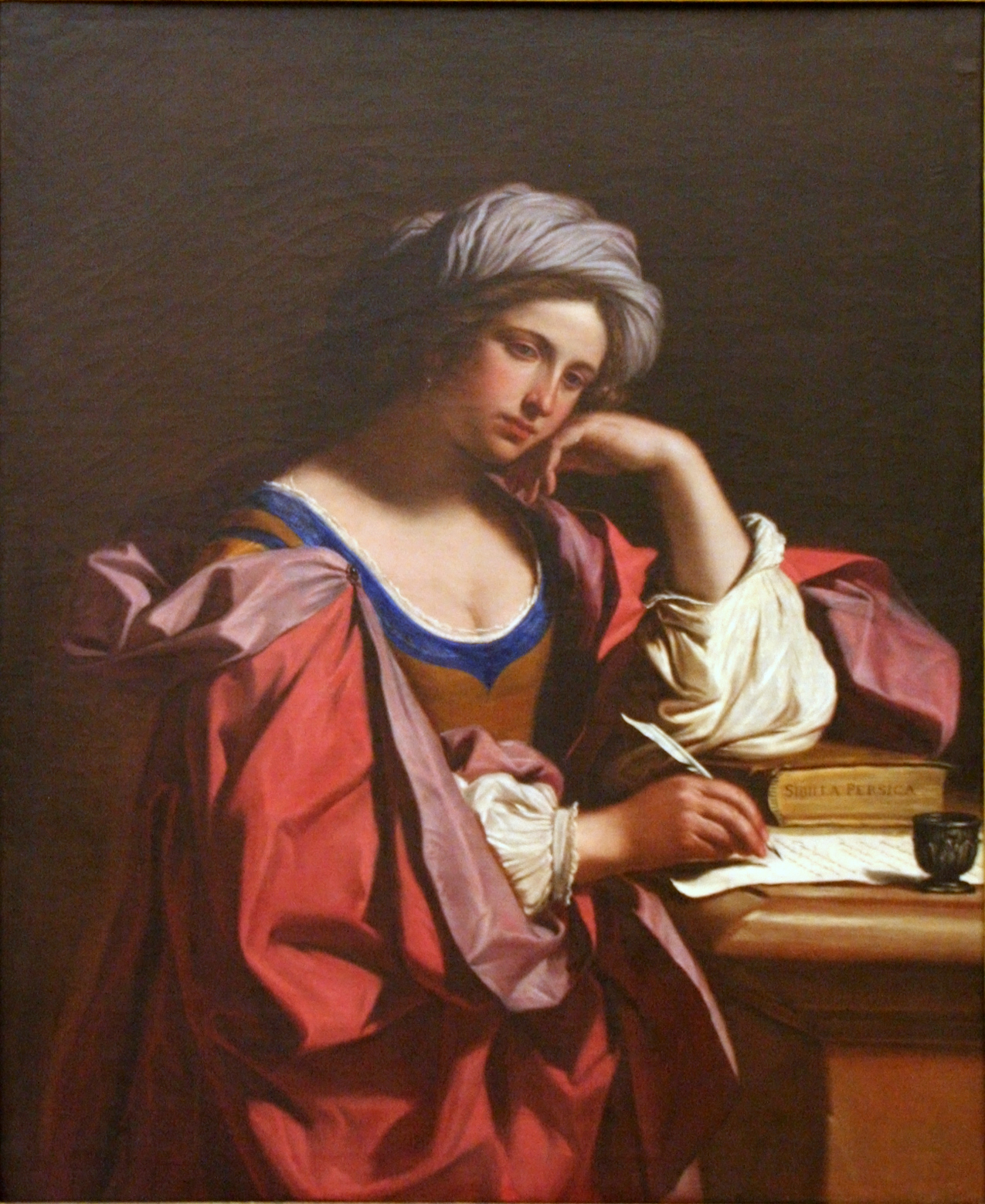
Persian Sibyl (1647) by Guercino

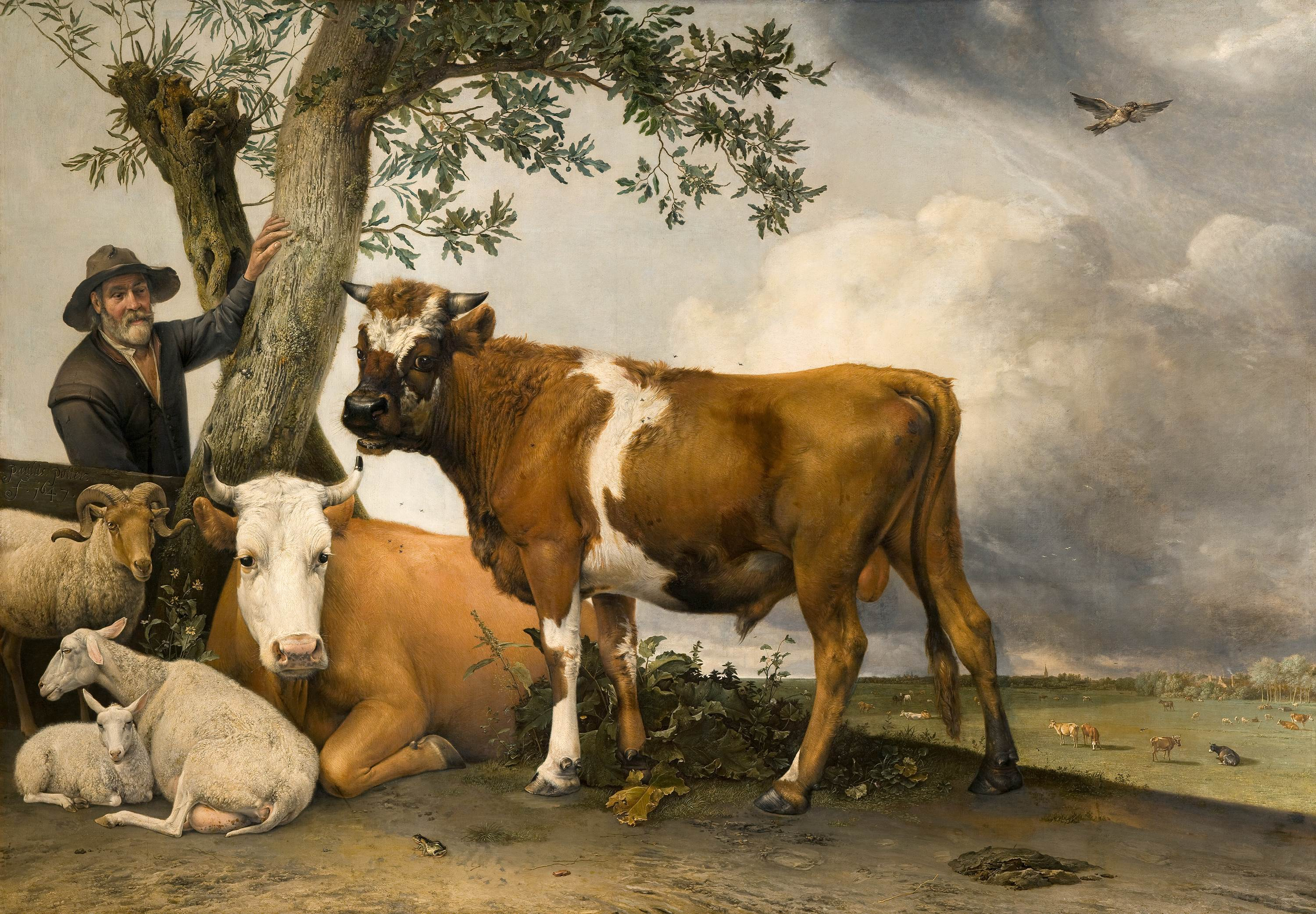
The Bull (1647) by Paulus Potter

- Guercino –
  - Persian Sibyl
  - Christ Crowned with Thorns
- Peter Lely – Portraits of:
  - James, Duke of York, Princess Elizabeth and Henry, Duke of Gloucester
  - Edward Massie
- Jan van Goyen – Landscape with Dunes
- Paulus Potter – The Bull

=== Other ===
- Francesco Grue - Altarpiece at the church of San Donato, Castelli, Abruzzo

== Births ==
- April 18 - Elias Brenner, Swedish painter and archeologist (died 1717)
- November - Jan van Huchtenburg, Dutch painter (died 1733)
- date unknown
  - Jan Baptist Brueghel, Flemish Baroque flower painter (died 1719)
  - Andrea López Caballero, Spanish painter (died unknown)
  - Angelo Everardi, Italian painter of battle scenes (died 1680)
  - Jan Jiří Heinsch, Czech-German painter of the Baroque style (died 1712)
  - Philippe Magnier, French sculptor (died 1715)
  - Francis Place, English gentleman draughtsman, potter, engraver and printmaker (died 1728)
- probable
  - Gregorio De Ferrari, Italian painter of the Genoese school (died 1726)
  - Pieter Xavery, Flemish sculptor (died 1674)
  - Yu Zhiding, Chinese landscape painter during the Qing Dynasty (died 1709)

== Deaths ==
- May 6 - Simon de Passe, Dutch royal engraver and designer of medals (born 1595/1596)
- May 19 - Sebastian Vrancx, Flemish Baroque painter and etcher of the Antwerp school (born 1573)
- May/June - Pieter Quast, Dutch painter (born 1606)
- August 24 - Nicholas Stone, English sculptor and architect (born 1586)
- August 27 - Pietro Novelli, Italian painter, architect and stage set designer (born 1603)
- November 30 – Giovanni Lanfranco, Italian painter (born 1582)
- date unknown
  - Pietro Desani, Italian painter (born 1595)
  - Zeng Jing, Chinese painter during the Ming Dynasty (born 1564)
  - Bartolomé Román, Spanish Baroque painter known for his series of archangels (born 1587)
- probable
  - Sisto Badalocchio, Italian painter and engraver of the Bolognese School (born 1585)
  - Daniël Mijtens, Dutch portrait painter (born 1590)
