= Crown of Thorns (disambiguation) =

The crown of thorns was worn by Jesus of Nazareth during the Passion.

Crown of Thorns may also refer to:

== Biology and botany ==
- Crown-of-thorns starfish
- Euphorbia milii (Euphorbiaceae), a species of spurge
- Koeberlinia (Koeberliniaceae), a species of shrub
- Paliurus spina-christi (Rhamnaceae), also known as Christ's Thorn or Jerusalem Thorn
- See also: Gundelia tournefortii (a thistle-like plant)

== Music ==
- Crown of Thorns (album), an album by Rakaa, a member of the Dilated Peoples
- The Crown (band), Swedish death metal band formerly known as Crown of Thorns
- "Chloe Dancer/Crown of Thorns", a 1990 song by Mother Love Bone
- "Crown of Thorns" (Clark Datchler song), 1990
- "Thorn of Crowns", a song by Echo & the Bunnymen from the 1984 album Ocean Rain
- "Crown of Thorns", a song by Erasure from the 1989 album Wild!
- "Crown of Thorns", a song by Social Distortion from the 1996 album White Light, White Heat, White Trash
- "Crown of Thorns", a song by Nebula from the 2009 album Heavy Psych
- "Crown of Thorns", a song by Black Veil Brides from the 2014 album Black Veil Brides

== Other ==
- Crown of Thorns' Church, an Anglican church in Hong Kong Sheng Kung Hui
- Crown of Thorns (woodworking), a technique of self-supported interlocking pieces
- "Crown of Thorns" (short story), a short story by Poppy Z. Brite

== See also ==
- Christ Crowned with Thorns (disambiguation)
- The Crowning with Thorns (disambiguation)
