= The Crowning with Thorns =

The Crowning with Thorns refers to the Crown of Thorns being placed on the head of Jesus, and is a common subject in art, examples including:

- The Crowning with Thorns (Titian, Paris) painted in 1542/1543 by Titian
- The Crowning with Thorns (Titian, Munich) painted in 1576 by Titian
- The Crowning with Thorns (Caravaggio, Vienna) painted c. 1602/1604/1607 by Michelangelo Merisi da Caravaggio
- The Crowning with Thorns (Caravaggio, Prato) painted c. 1604-1605 by Michelangelo Merisi da Caravaggio
- The Crowning with Thorns (van Dyck) painted from 1618–1620 by Anthony van Dyck

== See also ==
- Christ Crowned with Thorns (disambiguation)
- Crown of Thorns (disambiguation)
