= Ecce Homo (Caravaggio, Madrid) =

Painting by Caravaggio

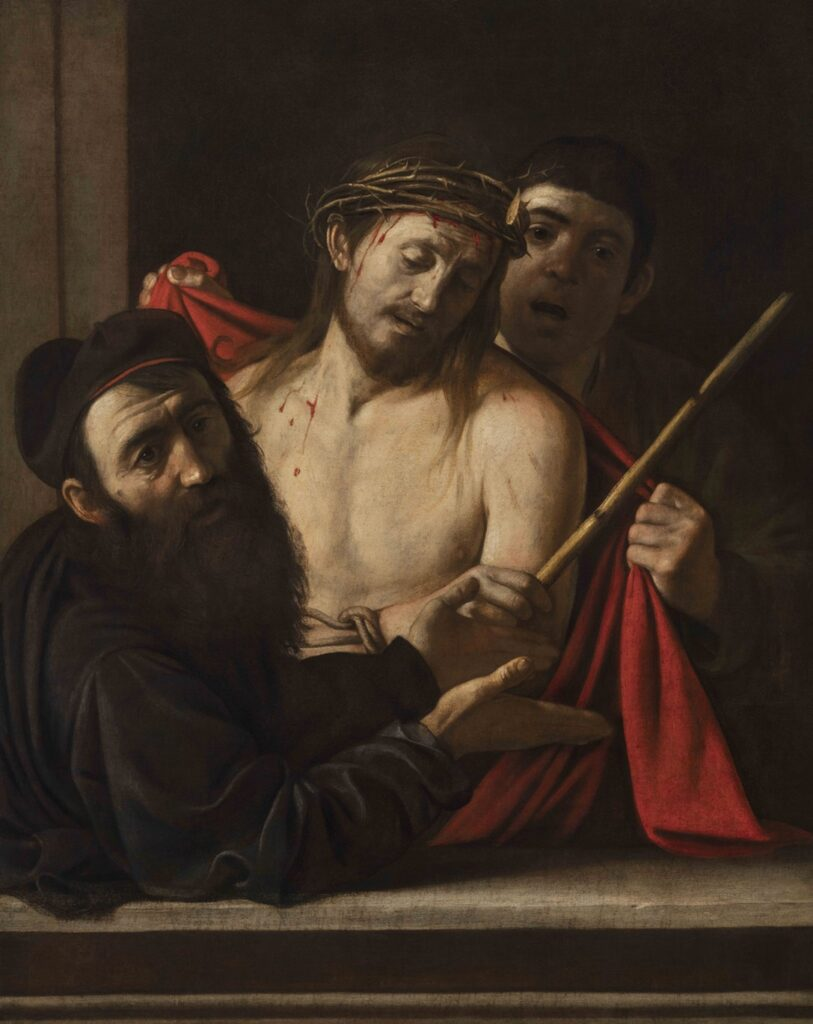
- Artist: Caravaggio
- Year: 1605–1609
- Dimensions: 86 cm × 111 cm (34 in × 44 in)
- Location: Museo del Prado; Madrid

Ecce Homo (c. 1605–1609) is a painting attributed to the Italian Baroque master Michelangelo Merisi de Caravaggio. It depicts the ecce homo. The artwork was brought from Italy to Spain and given to Evaristo Pérez de Castro, who kept it in his family's collection. At the beginning of an auction in April 2021, the painting was attributed to an associate of Jusepe de Ribera; the auction was halted after the Spanish government was notified of the possibility that the painting was by Caravaggio. It is now in the Museo del Prado in Madrid.

== Description ==
The artwork depicts Christ and Pontius Pilate in a scene of the ecce homo, a passage in the Bible during which Christ is presented to crowds before his crucifixion. Christ is shown bleeding and wearing a crown of thorns. Pilate is in front of him; another man holds a red robe behind Christ. The painting measures 86 cm (34 in) by 111 cm (44 in).

== History ==
The painting is believed to have been executed from 1605 to 1609. It was brought from Italy to Spain in the same century. The work is thought to have first appeared in 1631 as a belonging of Juan de Lezcano, a secretary of a Spanish viceroy. In 1657, it belonged to the Count of Castrillo. It stayed in the Spanish royal collection after being given to Philip IV of Spain; afterwards, it was owned by Manuel Godoy, the prime minister of Spain under Charles IV. The painting was then sold or given to the politician Evaristo Pérez de Castro during the French invasion of Spain in the Peninsular War; it remained in his family's collection in Madrid. The family put the painting up for auction in April 2021 for €1,500, where it was attributed to an associate of Jusepe de Ribera. The Spanish government then halted the auction after being notified by art experts of the possibility that the painting was the work of Caravaggio. It was placed on display in the Museo del Prado in Madrid on 27 May 2024.

== Attribution ==
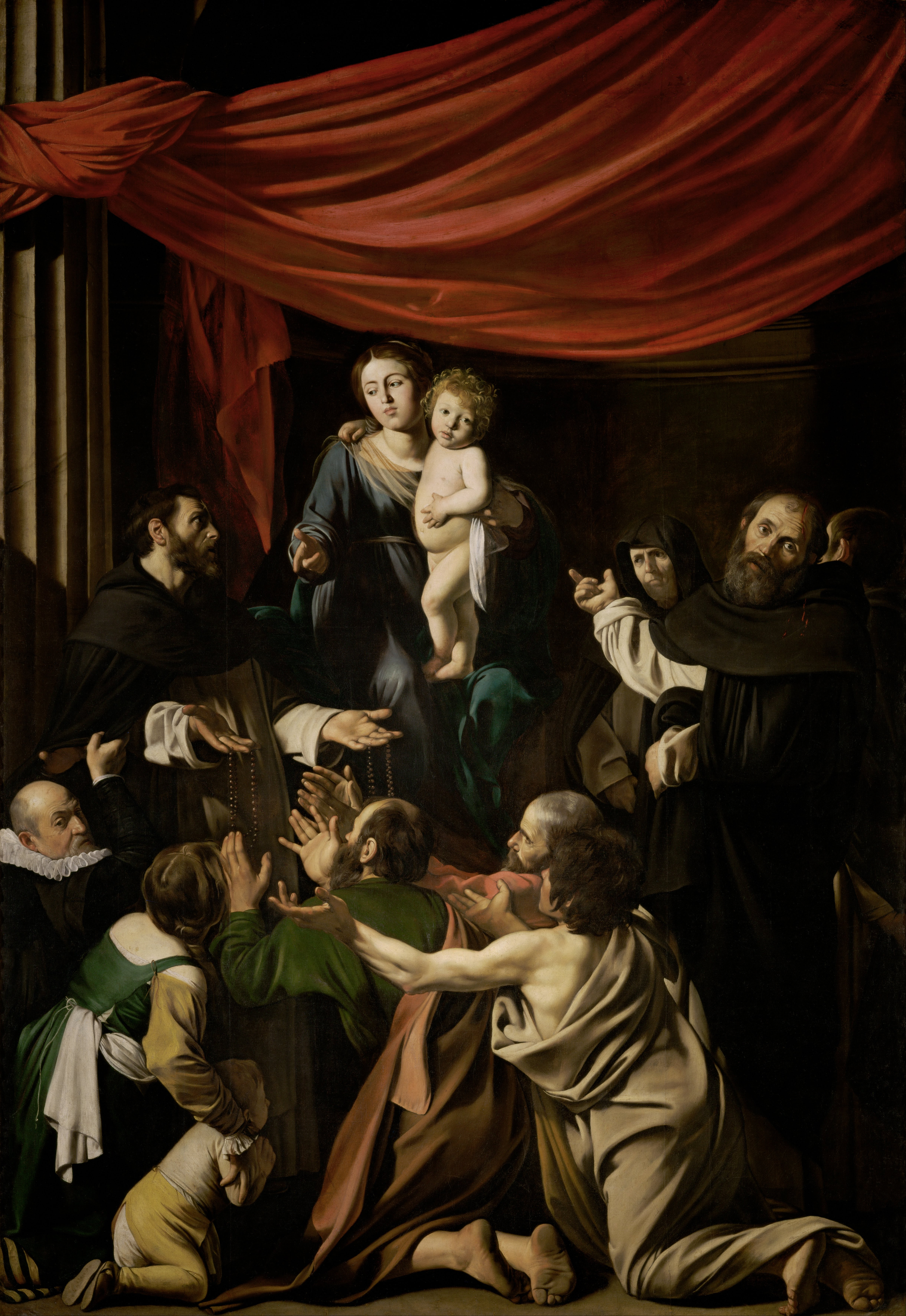
The Madonna of the Rosary has been compared to the Ecce Homo.

While it was being auctioned, the Ecce Homo was attributed to an unknown artist associated with Jusepe de Ribera, a Spanish artist who mimicked Caravaggio's style of painting. After certain details in the artwork were noticed by scholars, it has been mainly attributed to Caravaggio, an Italian painter who died in 1610. The artwork has been identified as his due to details such as brush strokes, the painting's size, and its similarity to other works by Caravaggio. Maria Cristina Terzaghi, an art history professor at Roma Tre University, cited Christ's head and torso and the "three-dimensional nature of the three figures" in the painting as evidence for Caravaggio's authorship. Terzaghi found the color of the robe in the painting to be similar to that in Caravaggio's Salome with the Head of John the Baptist; she also found the work similar to others by Caravaggio such as the Madonna of the Rosary. The Bologna Fine Arts Academy professor Massimo Pulini believed the work to be Caravaggio's based on "the inclination of Christ's face, the light, [and] the soldier's face," which he found similar to that of Bacchus in Young Sick Bacchus.

The painting's attribution has been disputed by scholars. Nicola Spinosa, a specialist in 17th-century Italian paintings, believes that the artwork was painted in Caravaggio's style, but is not an authentic work of his. In the journal Finestre sull'Arte, Camillo Mazitti opined that the artwork was "lacking in Caravaggio's dramatic vigour."

== See also ==
- Ecce Homo (Caravaggio, Genoa)
- List of paintings by Caravaggio
