= Palazzo degli Alberti =

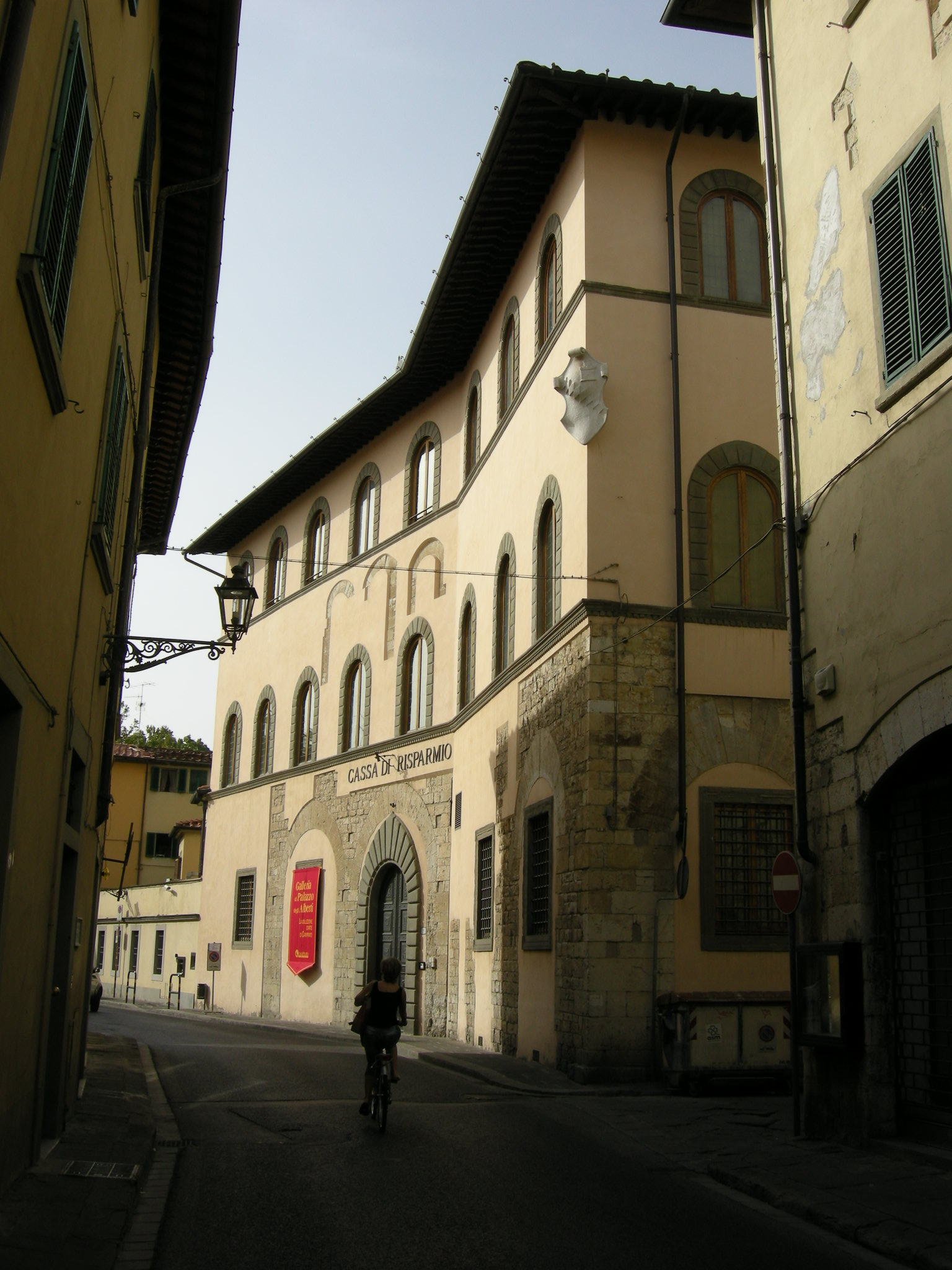
- Facade of the Palace
- Interactive map of the Palazzo degli Alberti area

General information
- Architectural style: Medieval architecture
- Location: Prato, via degli Alberti, 2
- Coordinates: 43°52′48.80″N 11°5′41.59″E
- Construction started: XII Century
- Completed: XVII Century

Palazzo degli Alberti (local: Casone degli Alberti) is a historical building in the center of Prato, Tuscany, central Italy (2, Via Degli Alberti). Originally the seat of Cassa di Risparmio di Prato (Cariprato), it long housed the bank’s most important art collection. In 2013 it was reported that Banca Popolare di Vicenza moved most of the collection to Vicenza after the liquidation of Cariprato.

The former owner of Cariprato, Fondazione Cassa di Risparmio di Prato, continued to use the building as its headquarters. Since 2022 the building — now owned by Intesa Sanpaolo — hosts the reopened Galleria di Palazzo degli Alberti, a public museum displaying many of the historic artworks.

== History ==
The palace originated in the 13th century, as evidenced by traces of loggiati and openings (later closed) in its façade, dating from that period and made of pietra alberese, a kind of Tuscan limestone.

The current appearance of the façade is from later restorations, performed in the late 15th-early 16th centuries. Features from this period include the portal, the windows and the two decorative frames. At the palace's corner is a stone coat of arms of the Bardi di Vernio family, to which, among the others, belonged Cosimo de' Medici's wife, Contessina de' Bardi.

In 1870, the Cassa di Risparmio di Prato, founded in 1830, moved its headquarters to the palace. The following year, the building was restored and enlarged, reaching its present size.

During 2020, the Intesa Sanpaolo (successor of Cariprato and Banca Popolare di Vicenza) separated the entrance to the bank branch and the entrance to the exhibition space. After further restoration and renovation, in 2022, the building was reopened as Galleria di Palazzo degli Alberti, a public museum with artworks including parts of the former bank's art collection.

== Art gallery ==
Palazzo degli Alberti currently houses the art gallery of the Cassa di Risparmio di Prato, with the most famous work of the collection being The Crowning with Thorns, attributed to Caravaggio (c. 1604).

The bulk of the collection is formed by Tuscan Baroque paintings from the 17th-18th century: the artists represented include Matteo Rosselli (Moses Saved from the Waters), Jacopo Vignali, Giovanni Battista Vanni, Francesco Furini (David and Goliath), Giovanni Bilivert (Angelica and Roger), Carlo Dolci, Cesare, Vincenzo and Pietro Dandini, Justus Sustermans (Portrait of Vittoria della Rovere, Livio Mehus, Francesco Conti, Giovanni Martinelli and Cosimo Salvestrini).

Renaissance paintings include a Madonna with Child (c. 1436) by a young Filippo Lippi, a Crucifixion(c. 1505) by Giovanni Bellini, as well as works by Santi di Tito. There is also a sculpture group by the Pratese artist Lorenzo Bartolini.

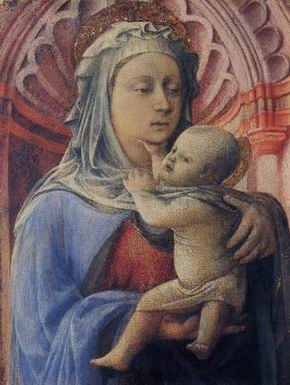
Madonna with Child (c. 1436), by Filippo Lippi.

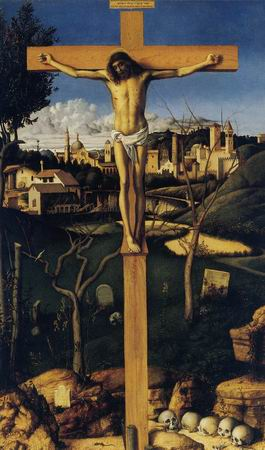
The rucifixion (Bellini, Prato)
by Giovanni Bellini
