= Ecce Homo (Caravaggio, Genoa) =

Painting by Caravaggio made during 1605/06 or 1609

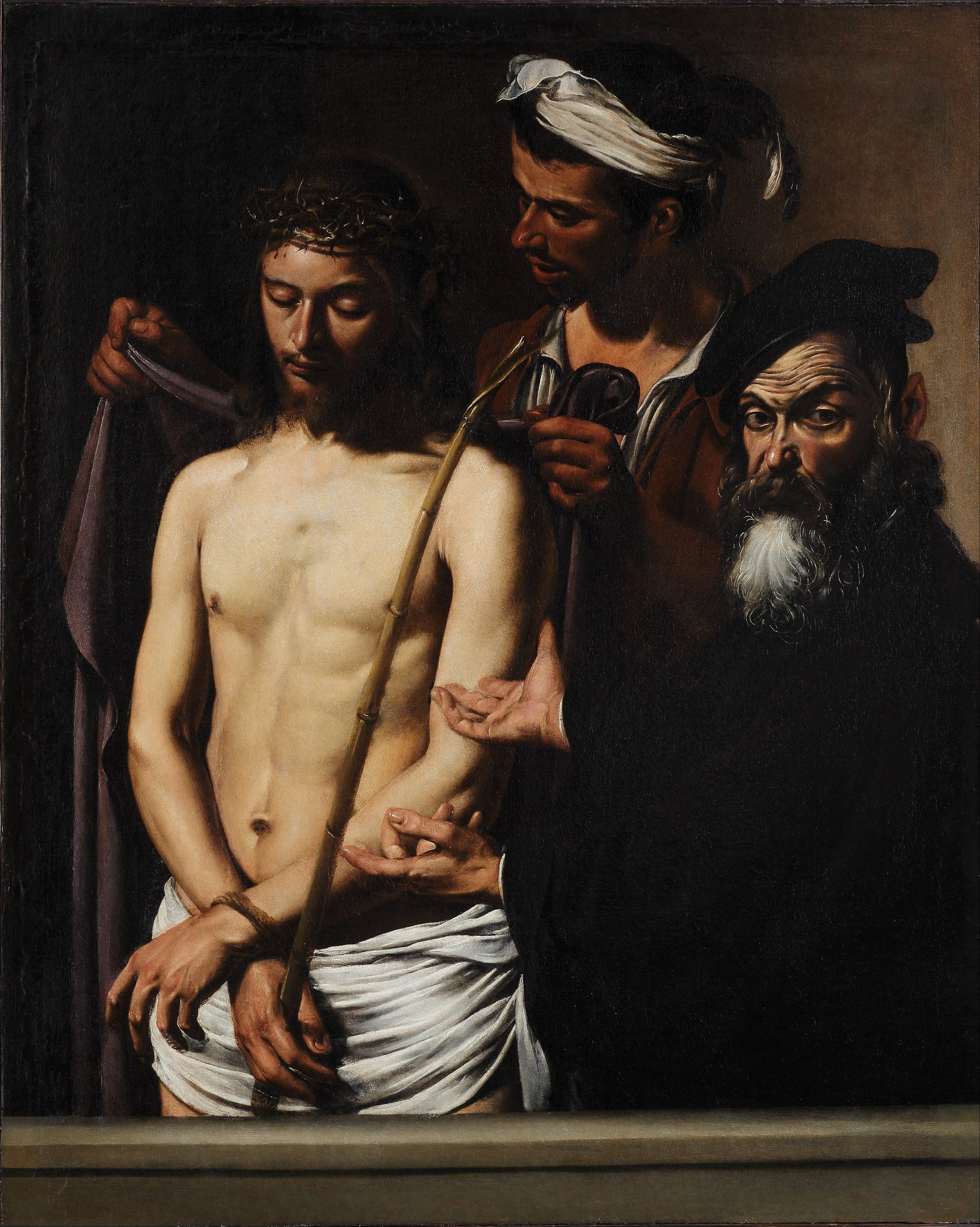
- Artist: Caravaggio
- Year: c. 1605
- Medium: Oil on canvas
- Dimensions: 128 cm × 103 cm (50 in × 41 in)
- Location: Palazzo Bianco; Genoa

Ecce Homo (c. 1605/06 or 1609 according to John Gash) is a painting of the moment from the Passion of Jesus by the Italian Baroque master Caravaggio. It is now in the Palazzo Bianco, in Genoa. Contemporary accounts claim the piece was part of an unannounced competition between three artists, and that the Caravaggio version was eventually sent to Spain.

Its attribution has been disputed, and a recently re-attributed version of the subject, now in Madrid, has been claimed to be the Caravaggio commissioned by Cardinal Massimo Massimi. The question remains unsettled.

== History ==
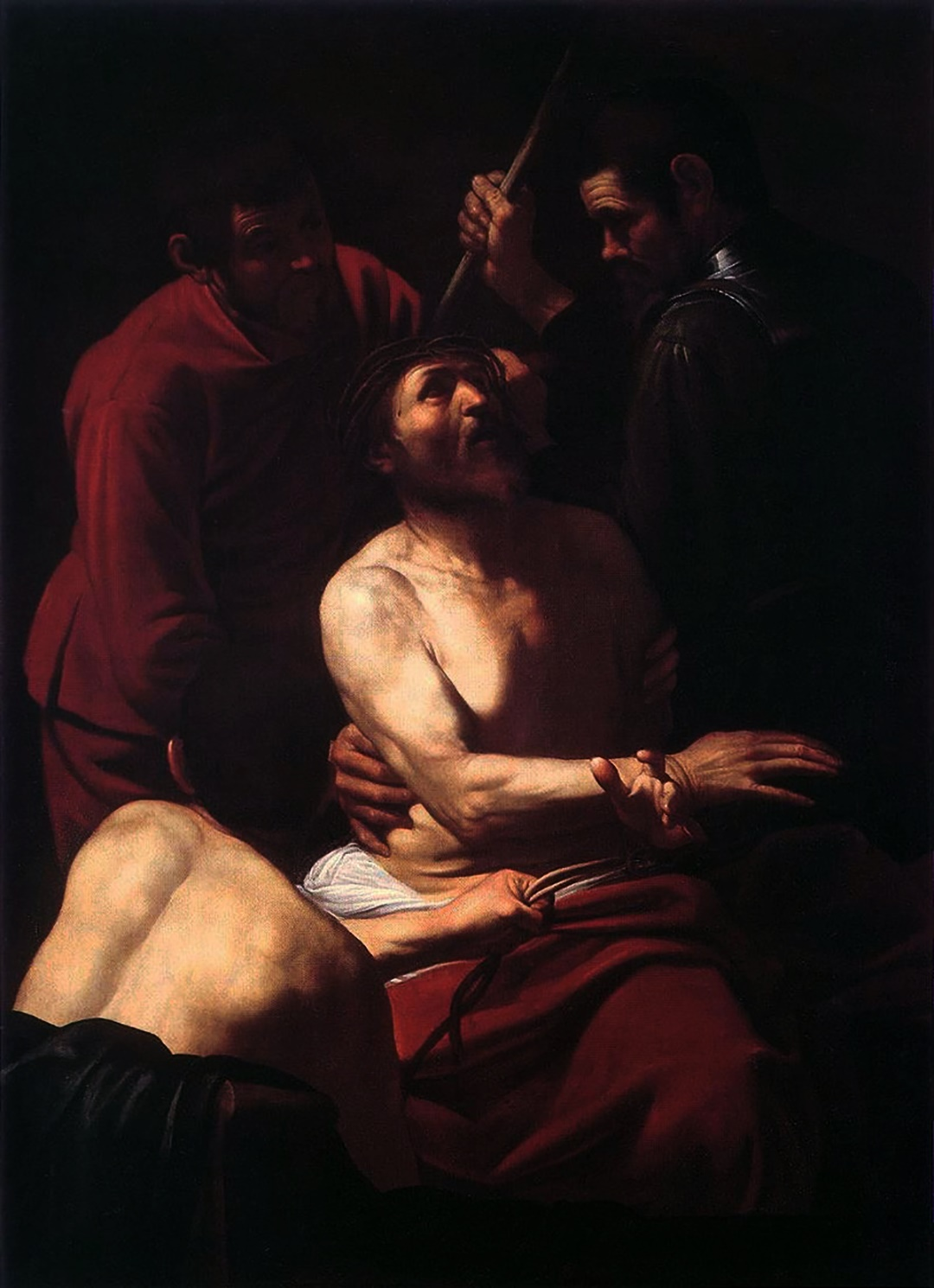
The Crowning with Thorns in Prato

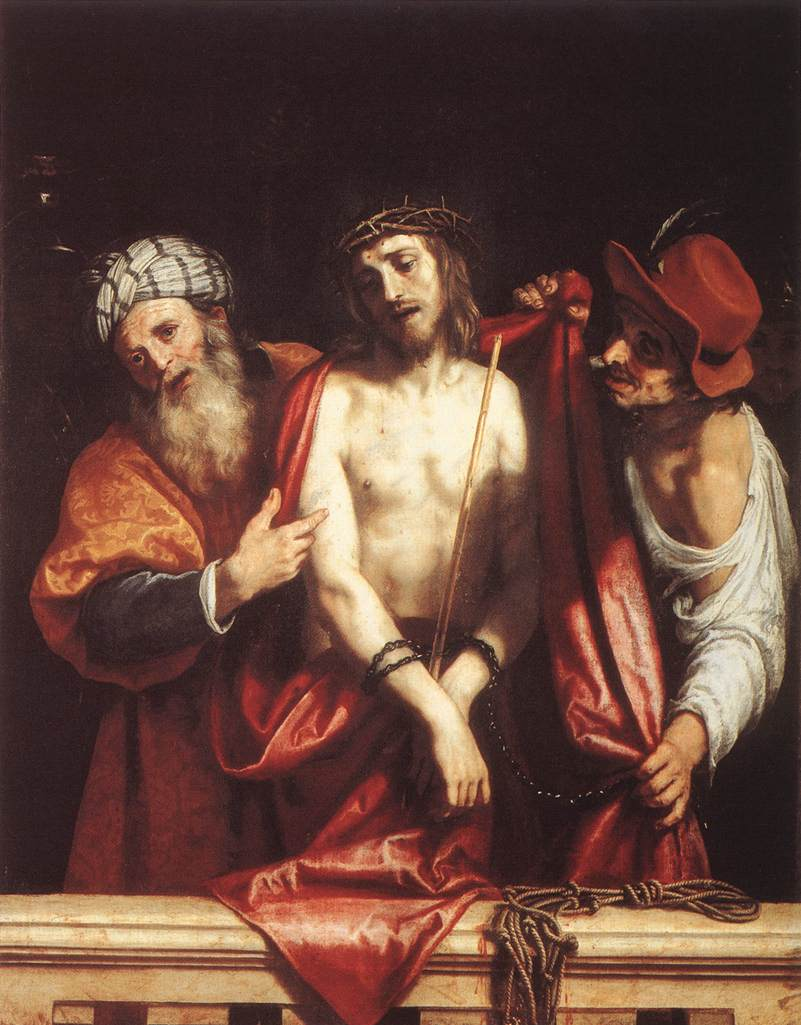
Ecce Homo, Cigoli, 1607. Pitti Palace

According to Giambatista Cardi, nephew of the Florentine artist Cigoli, Cardinal Massimo Massimi commissioned paintings of the Ecce Homo from three artists, Cigoli, Caravaggio, and Domenico Passignano, without informing the artists of the multiple commissions. Cardi claimed the cardinal preferred Cigoli's version. The Passignano painting has never resurfaced.

The scene is taken from the Gospel of John, 19:5. Pontius Pilate displays Christ to the crowd with the words, "Ecce homo!" ("Behold the man"). Caravaggio's version of the scene combined Pilate's display with the earlier moment of Christ, already crowned with thorns, mockingly robed like a king by his tormentors. Massimi already possessed a Crowning with Thorns by Caravaggio (thought to be the Crowning with Thorns in Prato), and Ecce Homo may have been intended as a companion piece. Stylistically, the painting displays characteristics of Caravaggio's mature Roman-period style. The forms are visible close-up and modelled by dramatic light, the absence of depth or background, and the psychological realism of, the torturer, who seems to mix sadism with pity. Pilate, in keeping with tradition, is shown as a rather neutral and perhaps almost sympathetic figure. He is also depicted wearing anachronistic clothing which was more contemporary to Caravaggio's time.

The contract for Ecce Homo was signed on 25 June 1605, with the painting to be delivered at the beginning August 1605. Whether Caravaggio met his deadline is uncertain, as by July he was arrested for attacking the house of Laura della Vecchia and her daughter, Isabella. Friends stood bail for him, but on 29 July he was in far more serious trouble for assaulting the notary Mariano Pasqualone over a well-known courtesan Lena and Caravaggio's model who is referred to by Pasqualone in the police complaint as "Michelangelo's (i.e. Caravaggio's) girl". Consequently, Caravaggio fled to Genoa until the end of August. He continued to be in trouble with the law throughout the year, with a complaint against him in September for throwing stones at his landlady's house, and a mysterious incident in October in which he was wounded in the throat and ear (Caravaggio claimed he had fallen on his own sword). In May 1606 he fled Rome again after killing Ranuccio Tomassoni in a duel, and he was not settled in Naples until the latter part of that year. Cigoli's Ecce Homo was not painted until 1607, and clearly attempts to mimic Caravaggio's style, suggesting that Massimi had not yet received his Caravaggio and was turning elsewhere. It is instructive to compare the two paintings: Caravaggio, unlike Cigoli, has dropped the convention of showing Christ's torturer as a grotesque, and has shown Pilate dressed as a 17th-century official.

Up until World War II the painting hung in a stairwell of the nautical school in Genoa, listed in the inventory as a copy by Leonello Spada. It was moved during the war, and for a time was considered lost. It was rediscovered in 1953 by the Genoa Director of Fine arts, Caterina Marcenaro, in the Palazzo Ducale.

The painting has twice been loaned for exhibitions in the United States. The most recent was for the bicentennial celebration of Genoa's sister city of Columbus, Ohio in 2012 at the Columbus Museum of Art.

== Restorations ==
Examinations after its rediscovery in 1953 revealed the painting was restored at some point during the eighteenth century. It was restored for its second time in 1954, by Pico Cellini in Rome. The painting was in very poor condition by 1954 and during the relining process Cellini had to add several inches of new cloth to all four edges of the canvas. The restoration is now thought to have been "particularly invasive" and may have gone so far as to have had "the addition of superficial shadows", leaving it "difficult to judge with certainty the autography of the underlying painting". This has led to many doubts about the autograph status of the work or even it could be attributed to Caravaggio.

The most recent restoration was carried out in Genoa by Cristina Bonavera Parodi in 2003. During this operation a full examination of the painting was made with new techniques including X-rays, Infrared reflectography, UV light reader, and optical microscopy. The curator who oversaw the process, Anna Orlando, believes a clear attribution of the work can be made to Caravaggio.

=== Disputed attribution ===
The painting was first attributed to Caravaggio in 1954 by noted art historian and Caravaggio scholar Roberto Longhi and Marcenaro. Other scholars, such as Sebastian Schutze, dispute the attribution of this work to Caravaggio, with Schutze noting that "the composition seems extremely cramped, and its narrative structure strangely fractured. The Roman governor seems to belong to a quite different plane of reality; he appears like the donor figure in an altarpiece and is painted in a different manner, with his facial features exaggerated almost to the point of caricature." Other scholars, including Anna Orlando (the curator who oversaw its most recent restoration) and Lorenzo Pericolo, believe it to be a genuine Caravaggio.

== See also ==
- List of paintings by Caravaggio
