= The Crowning with Thorns (Caravaggio, Prato) =

Painting by Caravaggio

The Crowning with Thorns I
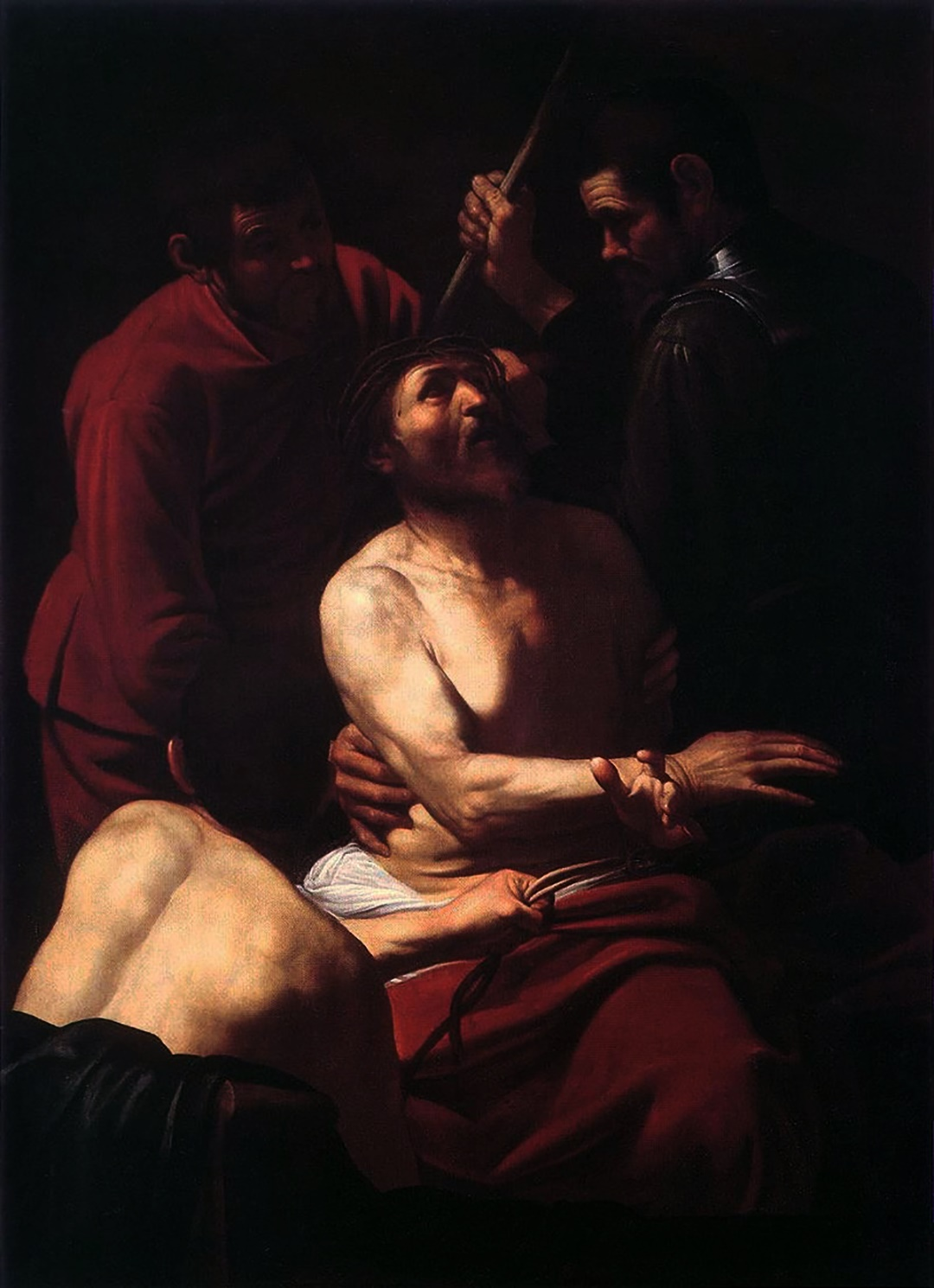
- Artist: Caravaggio
- Year: c. 1604
- Medium: Oil on canvas
- Dimensions: 178 cm × 125 cm (70 in × 49 in)
- Location: Palazzo degli Alberti; Prato

The Crowning with Thorns was the subject of two paintings by the Italian master Caravaggio. The first version, dated to around 1604–1605, is now in the Cassa di Risparmi e Depositi of Palazzo degli Alberti, Prato (Tuscany). The attribution to Caravaggio is disputed.

On June 25, 1605, Caravaggio wrote out, in his own hand, a contract to paint "a picture of the same size and value as the one I have already done for him of Christ's crowning", which restricts the Crowning to a period prior to this date. The recipient of both the Crowning with Thorns and the Ecce Homo—the painting to which the contract relates—was Massimo Massimi, a wealthy financier and art collector in the circle of Caravaggio's patron, marquis Vincenzo Giustiniani. The actual date is disputed—John Gash places it in 1601–1603.

Stylistically the painting is based on Rubens's altarpiece for the pose of Christ and on Titian's treatment of the same subject (now in the Louvre) for the soldier with the staff behind Christ. But Caravaggio has reverted to the compact, symmetrical approach employed by 15th-century artists, visible in, for example, the work of Hieronymous Bosch in Christ Mocked. The gestures which define the situation are restrained and understated—the almost imperceptible actions of the tormentors focus attention on Christ, who looks up, his bound hands slightly raised almost in forgiveness.

== See also ==
- List of paintings by Caravaggio

== Sources ==
- Gash, John (2003). Caravaggio. Chaucer. ISBN 1-904449-22-0.
- Robb, Peter (1998). M. Bloomsbury. ISBN 0-7475-4858-7.
