= Christ Crowned with Thorns (Bosch, El Escorial) =

Painting by a follower of Hieronymus Bosch

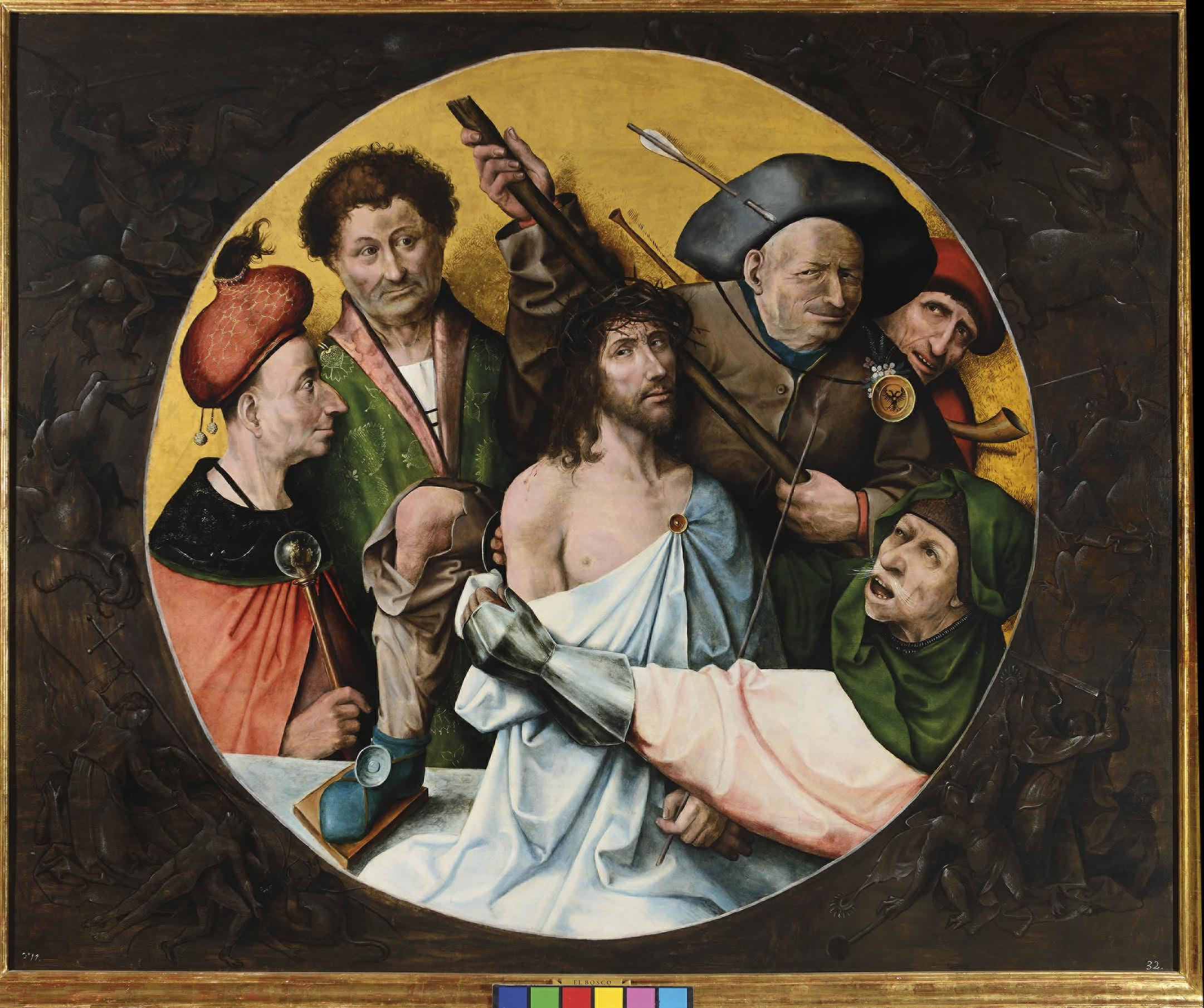
- Artist: follower of Hieronymus Bosch
- Year: 1530s
- Medium: Oil on oak panel
- Dimensions: 165 cm × 195 cm (65 in × 77 in)
- Location: El Escorial; Escorial

Christ Crowned with Thorns is an oil on panel painting made in the 1530s by a follower of Hieronymus Bosch. It is now in the Monasterio de San Lorenzo at El Escorial, near Madrid, in Spain.

The work is painted on a rectangular oak panel and measures 157 cm × 194 cm (62 in × 76 in). The main scene is set in a circular tondo with a gold background, surrounded by a grisaille painting of a battle between angels and demons.

It is an elaborated version of another Bosch's composition of the same subject, Christ Crowned with Thorns, held by the National Gallery, London, combining two events from Biblical account of the Passion of Jesus: the Mocking of Jesus and the Crowning with Thorns. As with the London version, this composition is centred on a half-length Jesus with a calm expression, accompanied by several other men, in this case, five others. The man to the far left, with a sceptre depicting Moses, is often identified as the High Priest Caiaphas, with the four others around Jesus interpreted as men obeying his orders. The calm expression of Jesus contrasts with the caricatured faces of the other men.

The painting was in the collection of Philip II of Spain by 1593. It may have been owned by Fernando de Toledo, former Viceroy of Catalonia, who fought in the Spanish Netherlands under his father Fernando Álvarez de Toledo, 3rd Duke of Alba.

It was formerly attributed to Bosch, but dendrochronological analysis of the panel in 2001 gave a date of the 1530s (or later), several years after Bosch's death in 1516, and it has been reattributed to a follower of Bosch, possibly Marinus van Reymerswaele. The version in London is securely attributed to Bosch.

The Prado holds a painting of the head of the man with a crossbow bolt through his hat.

The scene is similar to the central panel of the Passion Triptych in the Museu de Belles Arts de Valencia, circa 1530-1540, another painting by a follower of Bosch. The Christ Crowned with Thorns with Donor in the Royal Museum of Fine Arts Antwerp is also similar in composition but different in style. There are other examples by followers of Bosch in the Philadelphia Museum of Art, and the Kunstmuseum Bern, which are probably based on a second painting of the subject by Bosch which is now lost.

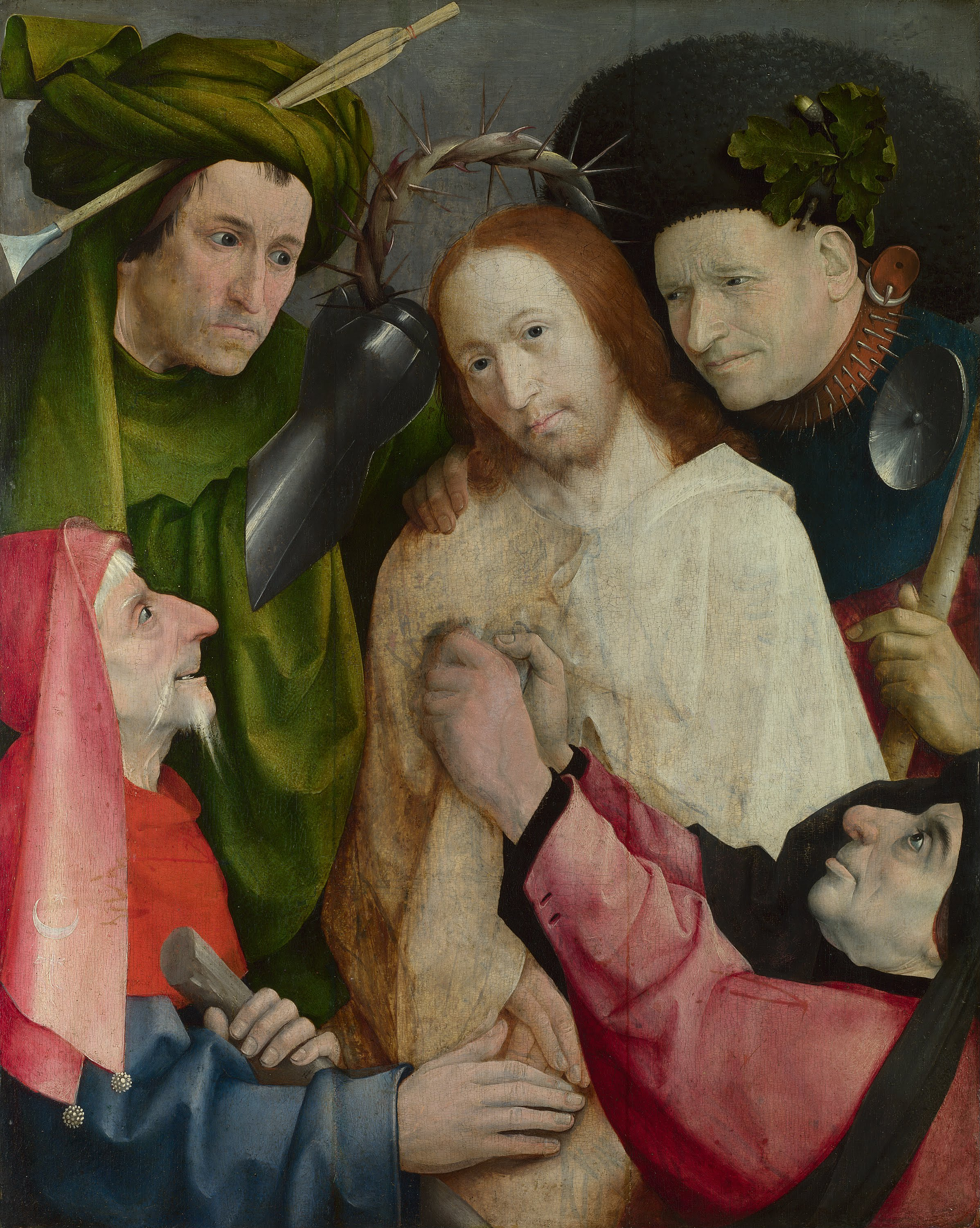
Christ Crowned with Thorns, by Bosch, c.1510, held by the National Gallery, London

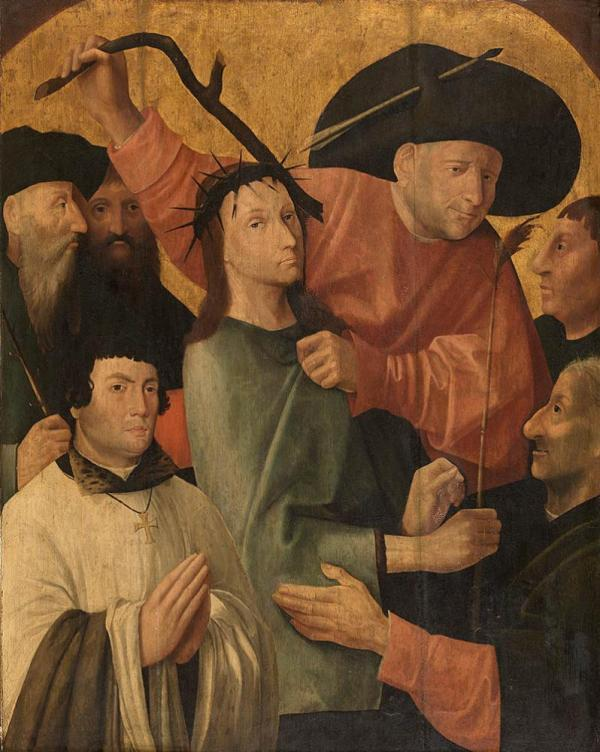
Christ Crowned with Thorns with Donor, by a follower of Bosch, in Antwerp

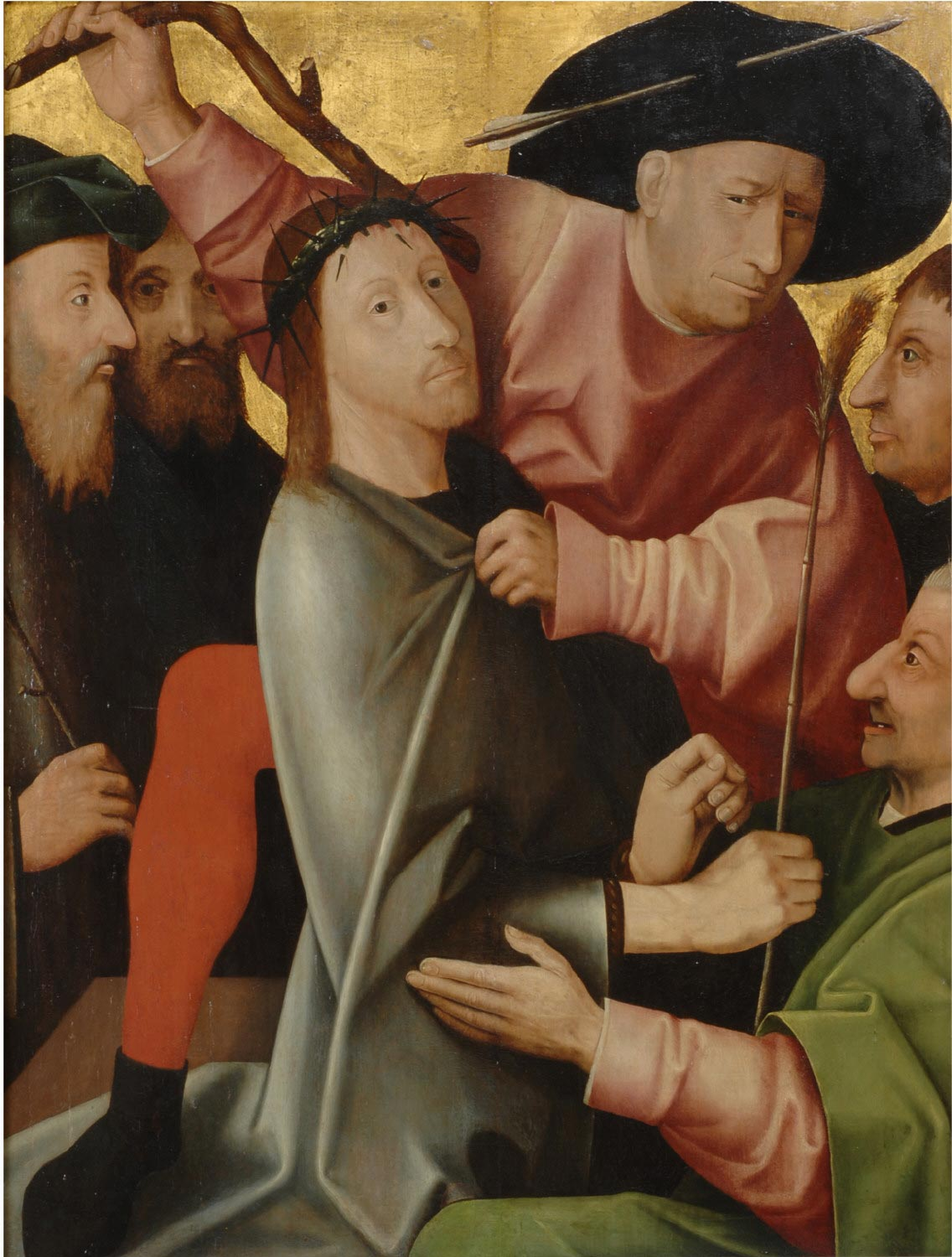
Version, by a follower of Bosch, after 1551, in the Philadelphia Museum of Art

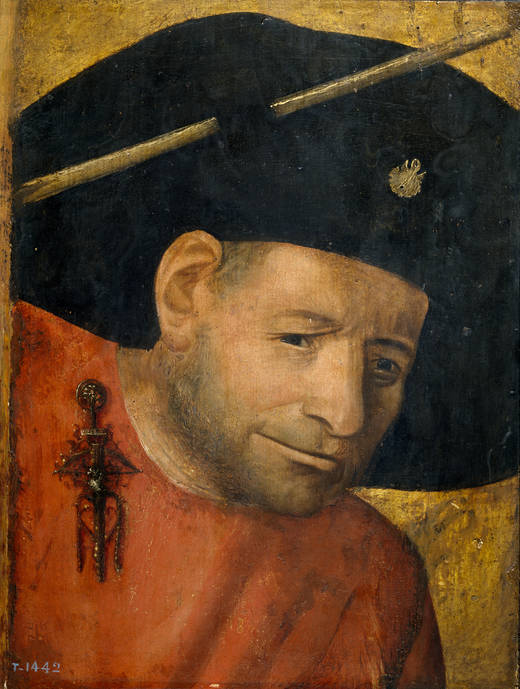
Head of a crossbowman, after 1549, Prado

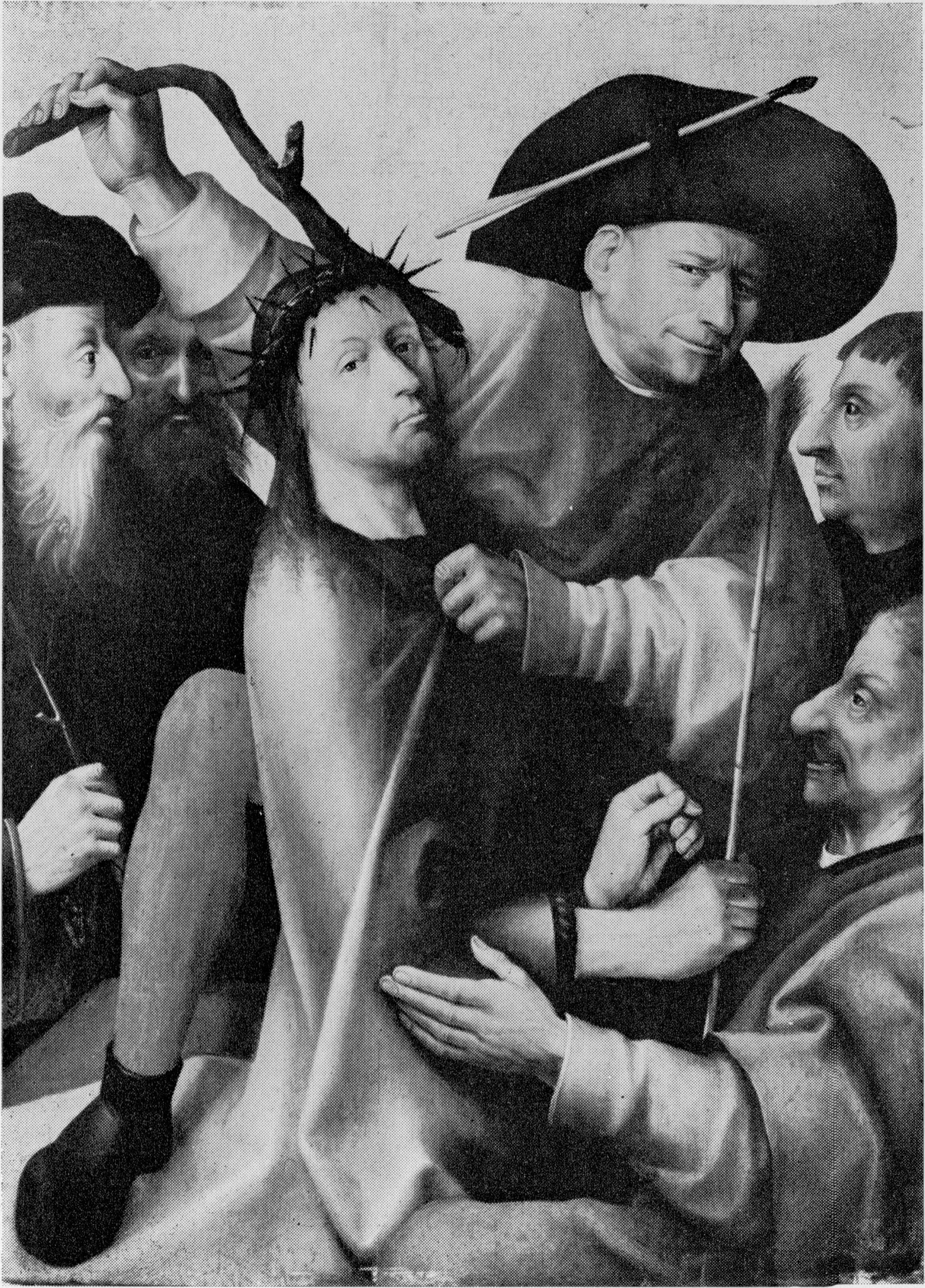
Crowning with Thorns, Museum of Fine Arts Bern (black and white photograph of colour painting)

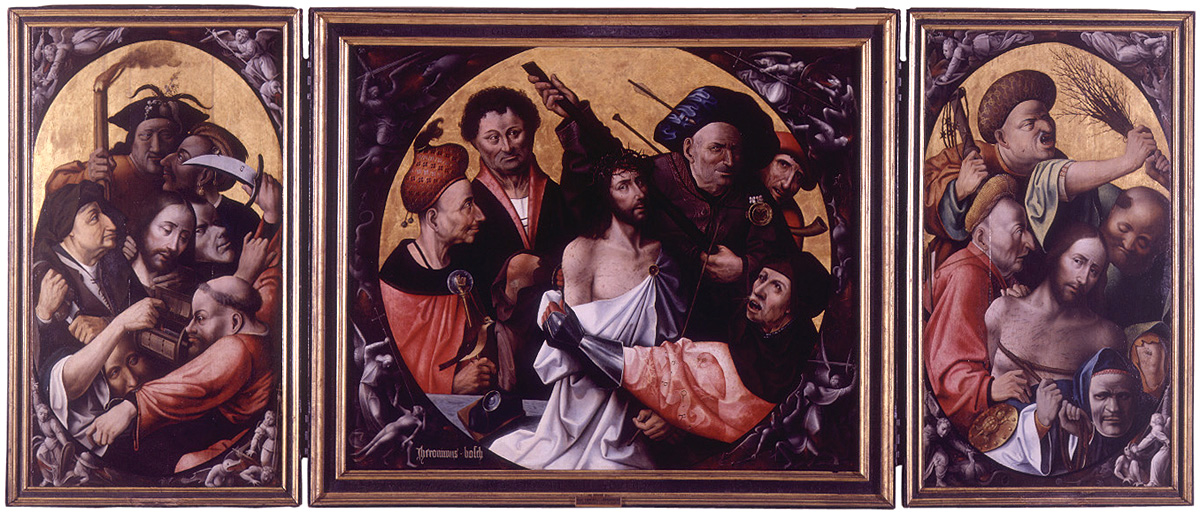
Passion Triptych, by a follower of Bosch, c.1530-1540, in the Museu de Belles Arts de Valencia
