= Christ Crowned with Thorns (Bouts) =

Painting by Aelbrecht Bouts

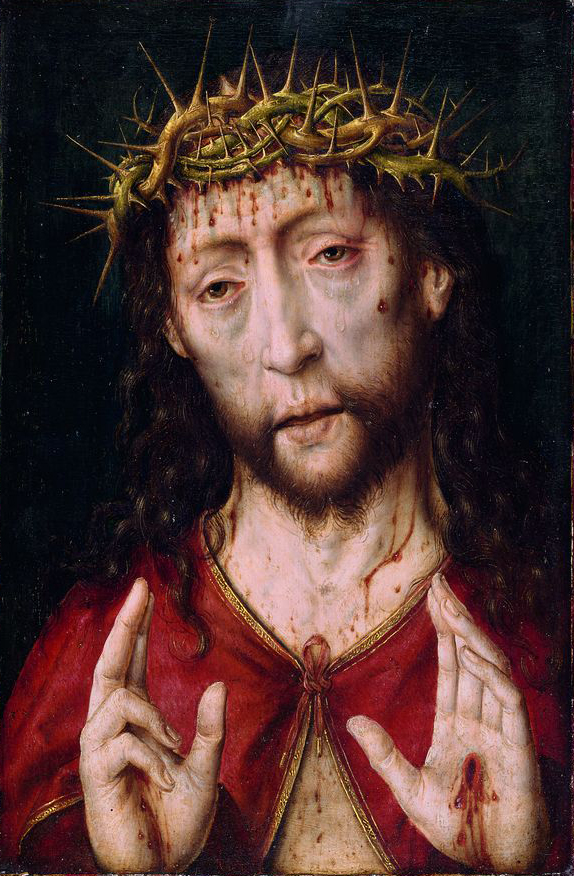
Christ Crowned with Thorns (c. 1500) by Albrecht Bouts

Christ Crowned with Thorns is a c.1500 oil on panel painting by Albrecht Bouts, now in the Musée des Beaux-Arts de Lyon, which acquired it in 2011.

== Sources ==
- http://www.culture.gouv.fr/public/mistral/joconde_fr?ACTION=CHERCHER&FIELD_1=REF&VALUE_1=000PE030019
