= Andrea López Caballero =

Spanish painter

Andrea López Caballero (born 1647) was a Spanish painter. He was born in Naples, but studied in Madrid under José Antolínez. He devoted himself chiefly to portrait painting, though in Madrid is a picture of Christ with Virgin Mother and Mary Magdalen.
