= Christ Crowned with Thorns (Bosch, London) =

Painting by Hieronymus Bosch

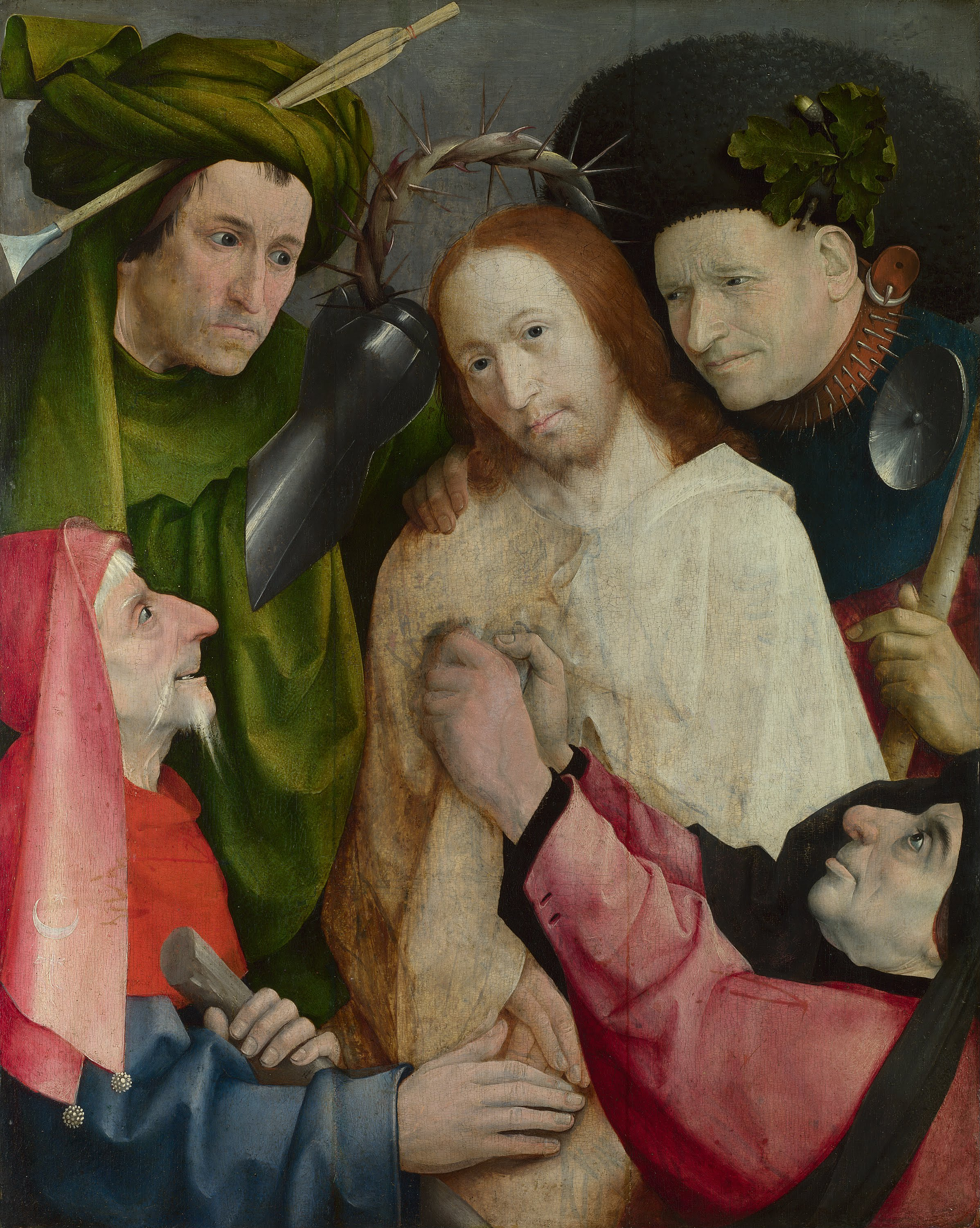
- Artist: Hieronymus Bosch
- Year: c. 1510
- Type: Oil on wood
- Dimensions: 73.8 cm × 59 cm (29.1 in × 23 in)
- Location: National Gallery, London

Christ Crowned with Thorns, sometimes known as Christ Mocked, is an oil on panel painting by Hieronymus Bosch. It is held in the National Gallery in London, which dates it to around 1510, though some art historians prefer earlier dates.

Another painting of the same subject in Bosch's style but with a different composition is held by the El Escorial near Madrid, Christ Crowned with Thorns; this is now usually attributed to a follower. Other paintings similar to the London version by followers of Bosch are held in several public collections, including in particular Christ Crowned with Thorns with Donor in the Koninklijk Museum in Antwerp, but also examples in the Philadelphia Museum of Art, and the Kunstmuseum Bern, which are probably based on another painting of the subject by Bosch, now lost. Similar scenes are also included in the Passion Triptych in the Museu de Belles Arts de Valencia, also by a follower of Bosch.

== Description ==
The oil painting combines two events from Biblical account of the Passion of Jesus: the Mocking of Jesus and the Crowning with Thorns. A serene Jesus, dressed in white at the centre of the busy scene, is gazing calmly from the picture, in contrast with the violent intent of the four men around him. Two armoured soldiers stand above and behind him, with two other spectators kneeling below and in front.

The soldier to the right, with oak leaves in his hat and a spiked collar, is grasping Christ's shoulder, while the other soldier to the left, dressed in green with a broad-headed hunting crossbow bolt through his headdress, holds the crown of thorns in a gauntleted hand, about to thrust it onto Christ's head. The position of the crown of thorns creates a halo above the head of Jesus. In front, the man the left has a blue robe and red head covering, and the man to the right in a light red robe is grasping Christ's cloak to strip it off. Examination of the picture has shown that in the preliminary sketch, the scene was more brutal, and the cruelty has been toned down in the final version, making the men's expressions more enigmatic. The four tormentors of Christ may show different aspects of the four humours, with phlegmatic and melancholic soldiers, and sanguine and choleric spectators. The figures are crowded together in a small space in a single plane, in a manner reminiscent of Flemish devotional art of the type popularized by Hans Memling and Hugo van der Goes.

The painting is on an oak panel and measures 73.8 cm × 59 cm (29.1 in × 23.2 in). It was painted on top of an unfinished painting of Saint Christopher, probably also by Bosch. It is in good condition, although some hues have faded, particularly red lakes, and the copper greens are turning brown. Thinning paint has revealed some of the underdrawing and pentimenti.

It was in the collection of Hollingworth Magniac, known as the Colworth collection, and then sold from the estate of his son Charles Magniac in 1892 and bought by Robert Thompson Crawshay (the fourth son of Robert Thompson Crawshay). It was later bought by an art dealer, the Galleria San Giorgio in Rome, and it was bought by the National Gallery in 1934.

== Interpretation ==
Christ Crowned with Thorns is both a departure from Bosch's usual style and from the way the Passion was customarily depicted at the time, with blood and violence. The painting is deceptively simple and has hidden symbolism. For example, the oak leaves in the hat of the figure at top right would have been understood at the time to refer to Pope Julius II, a member of the della Rovere family; and the other soldier, with the crossbow bolt in his hat, refers to the alliance between the pope and the Holy Roman Emperor Maximilian I and Louis XII of France in furtherance of the pope's militaristic ambitions. The lower figures represent the bourgeoisie and the peasantry; the lower figure on the right is identified as a Jew by his physiognomy, and the one on the left as a Turk by the crescent moon and star on his headdress; they refer to the fact that the pope was prepared to borrow money from Jews and even had dealings with the infidel Turks.

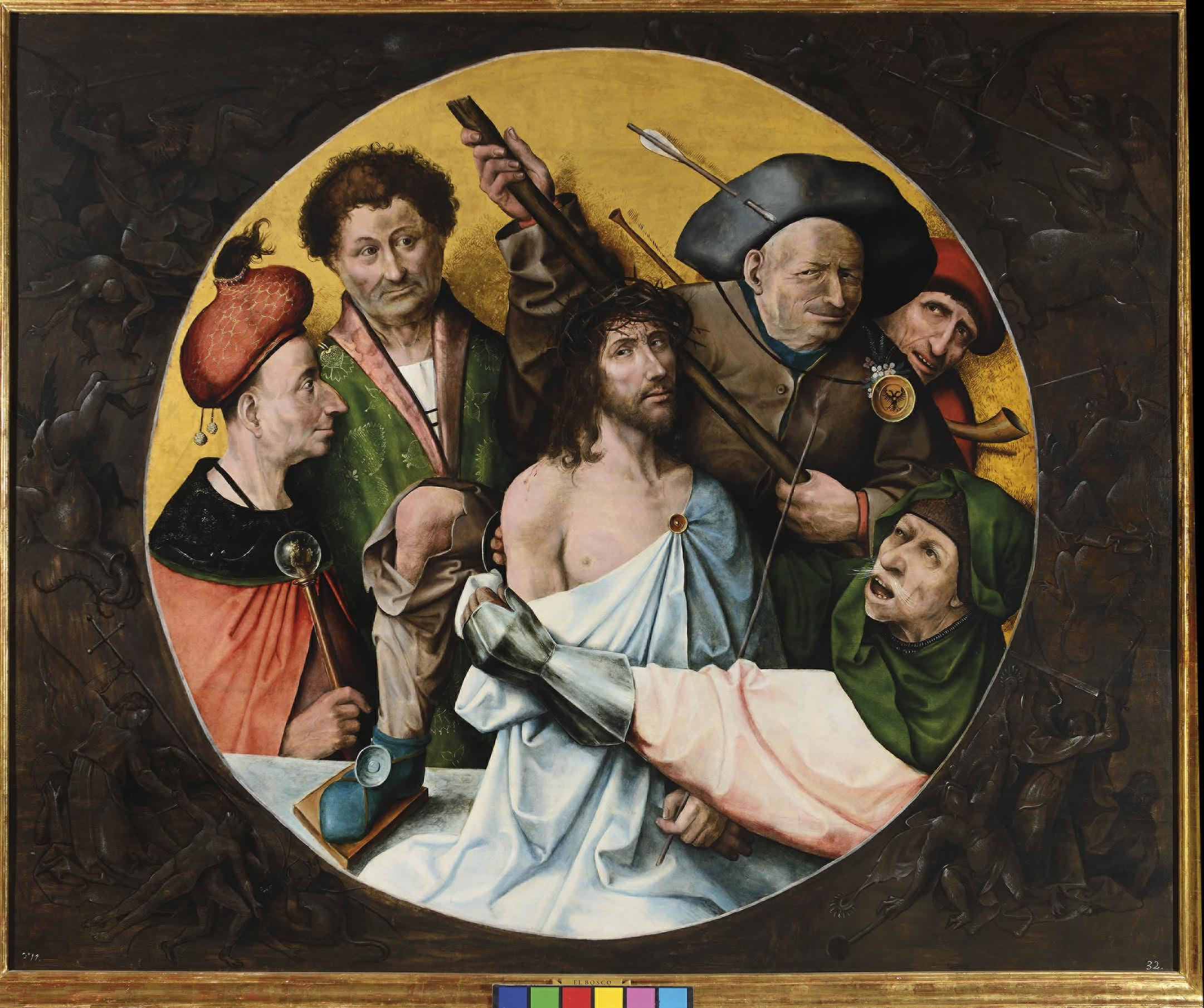
Christ Crowned with Thorns, by a follower of Bosch, in El Escorial

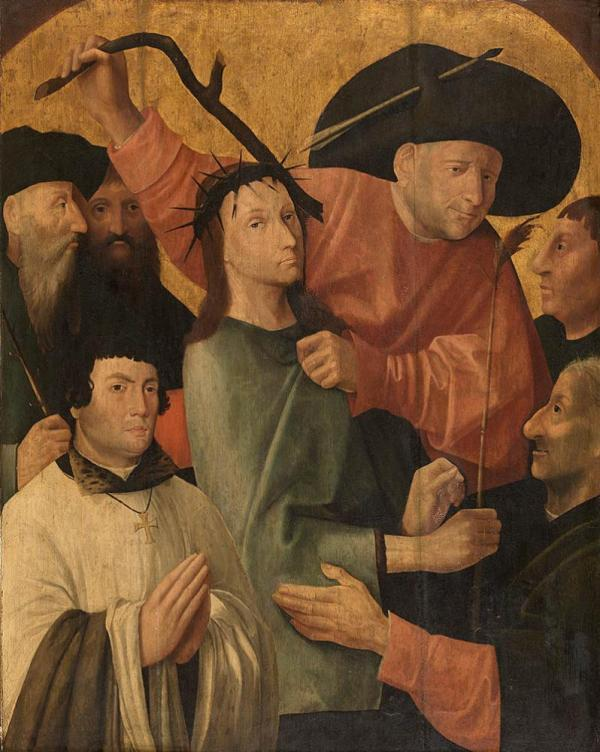
Similar painting, by a follower of Bosch, in Antwerp

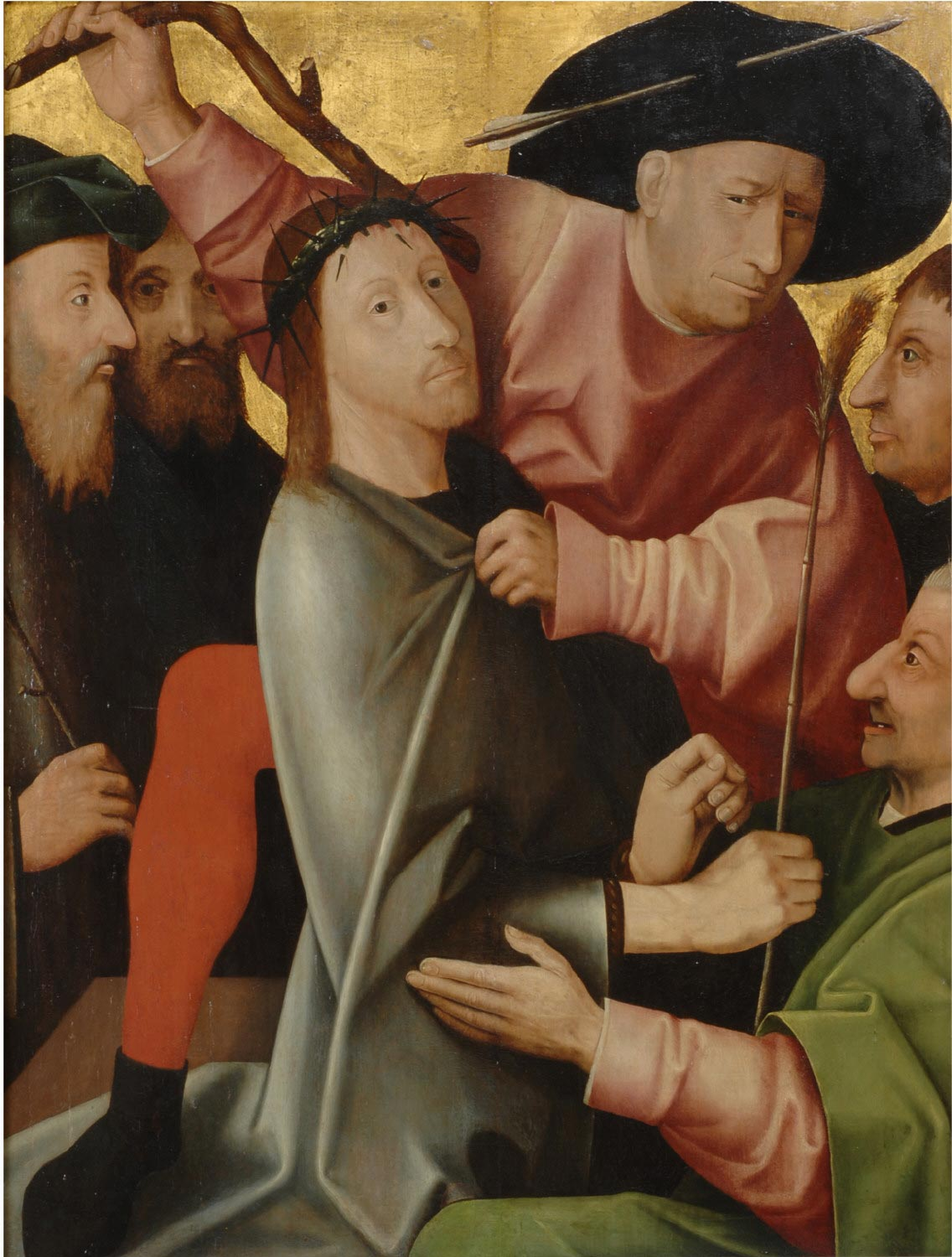
Version, by a follower of Bosch, in the Philadelphia Museum of Art

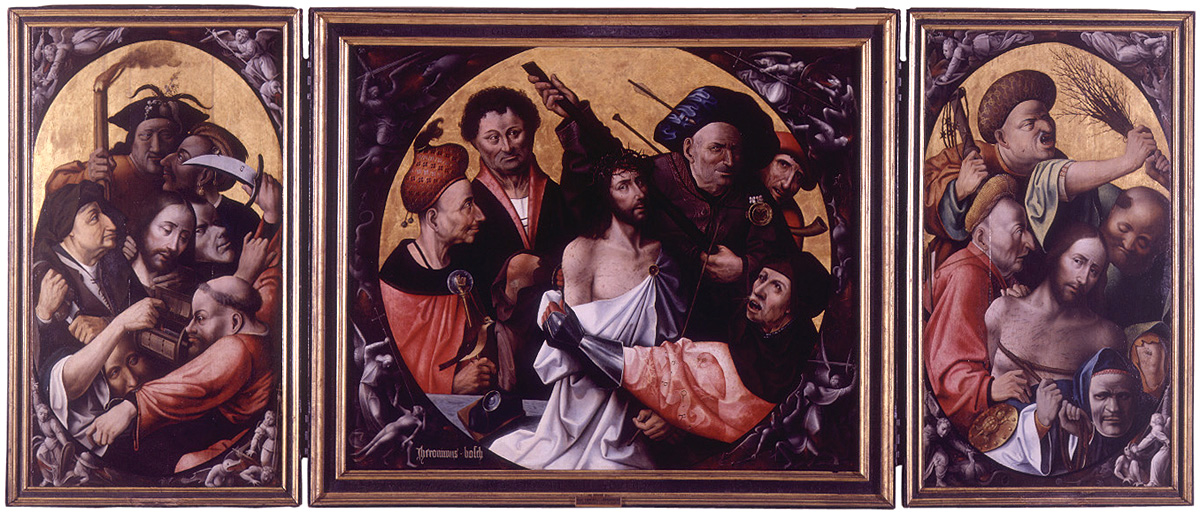
Passion Triptych, by a follower of Bosch, in the Museu de Belles Arts de Valencia

== See also ==
- List of paintings by Hieronymus Bosch
