= Christ Crowned with Thorns (Guercino) =

Painting by Guercino

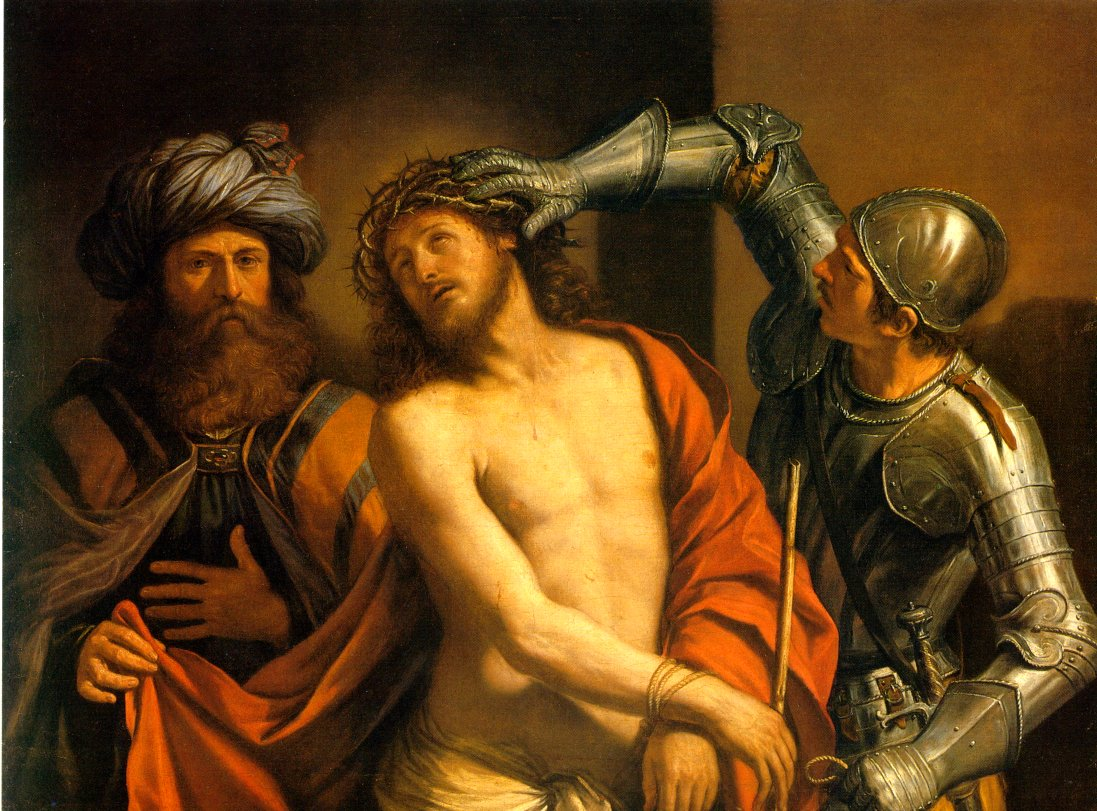
Christ Crowned with Thorns (1647) by Guercino

Christ Crowned with Thorns or Ecce Homo is a 1647 oil on canvas painting by Guercino, depicting Jesus with a crown of thorns. It was commissioned by Marchese Tanari and for which a preparatory drawing survives in the Morgan Library. The painting was bought by Maximilian I Joseph of Bavaria in 1819 or 1820 and is now in the Alte Pinakothek in Munich.
