= Gordon Apps =

Gordon Frank Mason Apps
- Born: 3 May 1899; Lenham, Kent, England
- Died: 24 October 1931 (aged 32); Peterboro, Ontario, Canada
- Military career
- Allegiance: England
- Branch: Aviation
- Rank: lieutenant
- Nickname: "Mable"
- Unit: No. 66 Squadron RAF
- Awards: Distinguished Flying Cross

Lieutenant Gordon Frank Mason Apps (3 May 1899 – 24 October 1931) was a British-born World War I flying ace credited with 10 aerial victories. After working for the Imperial Wireless Chain in England postwar, he returned to Canada and joined the nascent Royal Canadian Air Force. He performed pioneering aerial photography survey work while in the RCAF.

== Early life ==
Gordon Frank Mason Apps was born on 3 May 1899 in Lenham, Kent. He was the second oldest of the four sons of Kate Helena and Henry Apps, a sanitary inspector. Gordon Apps first attended the local Lenham School, then Sutton Valence School. Once educated, he worked for about a year and a half at the Tilling-Hastings munitions and engine factory.

== World War I ==
Gordon Apps followed his elder brother into the Artists Rifles in 1917; he transferred to the Royal Flying Corps in late August. His training took him successively through No. 2 Officer Cadet Wing and No. 2 School of Instruction at Oxford before he transferred to No. 9 Training Squadron at Norwich for flight training on Maurice Farman Shorthorns and Longhorns. After soloing, he shipped out to RAF Turnberry's Gunnery School, then to RAF Ayr's Fighting School. He then went on to Shawbury to polish his skills in both 67 and 10 Training Squadrons. On 22 November 1917, he was forwarded to Italy to join 66 Squadron, arriving 29 December 1917.

On 11 March 1918, he was on patrol at 14,000 feet (4,300 m) altitude with Alan Jerrard and Peter Carpenter when they attacked half a dozen enemy aeroplanes. Apps sent one down out of control; Carpenter saw it drop into a deep gully. Later that month, on the 28th, Apps fired 300 rounds of machine gun ammo into an enemy Albatros D.III, chasing it downwards from 10,000 feet (3,000 m) to just 400 feet (120 m); he was credited with its destruction over Spresiano.

On 4 May 1918, Apps set one opposing Albatros down in flames on the banks of the Piave River and downed another making headon firing passes on him. The latter foe crawled from the wreckage only to be strafed by another British pilot; this victim was probably Austro-Hungarian ace Andreas Dombrowski. On 24 May, Apps became an ace while flying as wingman to famed ace "Billy" Barker, being credited with another Albatros D.III destroyed.

Apps scored in both morning and evening of 21 June 1918, destroying an Albatros D.V and driving another down out of control. A week later, he destroyed an Albatros D.III. On 13 July, he destroyed an Austro-Hungarian Berg D.I fighter. On the 16th, he shared in driving down an enemy two-seater reconnaissance craft out of control for his tenth win.

The day after his last win, on 17 July 1918, Apps was wounded by anti-aircraft shrapnel. On 2 August, he was shipped to France for treatment at 62 General Hospital. When discharged as fit for duty on 5 September, he returned to duty with his home squadron. He spent a short spell with them, during which he claimed an unconfirmed win on 16 September.

He won a Distinguished Flying Cross for his exploits; it was promulgated in the London Gazette 21 September 1918:

A bold and skilful airman who in recent operations has destroyed six enemy aeroplanes, accounting for two in one flight. He displays marked determination and devotion to duty.

Apps returned to Home Establishment in England. His posting over the next month is uncertain, but he spent November and December 1918 in a wireless course at Penshurst. He then served with 50 Squadron until discharged on 19 March 1919.

== Post World War I ==
For about two and a half years postwar, Apps supervised a construction crew of approximately 100 in building the Imperial Wireless Chain. A short-term job in Canada followed. In the meantime, Apps applied to the Royal Canadian Air Force. He joined his old commander "Billy" Barker in the new air force on 19 March 1924. After a round of assignments to Winnipeg, Victoria Beach, Barrie, and Norway House, he was posted to an aerial survey project in 1926, tasked to photograph 25,000 square miles (65,000 km^{2}) in the Red Lake District.

Apps married Norma Clairs Kennedy at RCAF Station Winnipeg on 10 December 1927. Three years later, he was sent to RAF Calshot, England for a technical course. He spent 15 December 1930 through 19 January 1931 on leave in England. The course ran from 20 January until April, and Apps took another leave post-course. His father Henry Apps died during this time; this may have given reason for some of the leave. By 28 May 1931, Gordon Apps had returned to RCAF duty at Camp Borden.

On 24 October 1931, Apps was flying Fairchild 71 serial no. 114 with Sergeants John Pettit Hand, Humphrey Madden, Claude Keating and George Gillespie aboard. Apps fatally crashed while landing at Peterborough Airport. He and Hand died shortly afterwards in Hospital, the other passengers were injured but survived. His burial, accompanied by a RCAF military escort, was held in Winnipeg at the Chapel of Thompson Mortuary. He was buried at St. Johns.
