= William Carrall Hilborn =

Canadian World War I flying ace

William Carral Hilborn
- Born: 5 July 1898; Quesnel, British Columbia, Canada
- Died: 26 August 1918 (aged 20); Grosso, Italy
- Burial place: Plot 6, Row A, Grave 8, Montecchio Precalcino Communal Cemetery Extension, Montecchio Precalcino, Italy
- Military career
- Allegiance: Canada; United Kingdom
- Branch: Royal Flying Corps
- Service years: 1917-1918
- Rank: Captain
- Units: No. 66 Squadron RAF, No. 28 Squadron RAF, No. 45 Squadron RAF
- Awards: Distinguished Flying Cross

Captain William Carrall Hilborn (whose middle and last names are variously spelled Carroll and Hillborn) (5 July 1898 – 26 August 1918) was a World War I Canadian flying ace. He was raised as a western Canadian pioneer. He undertook his own aviation education in his eagerness to join the Royal Flying Corps. He overcame physical problems and a tendency toward airsickness to become a wingman to famed Canadian ace William George Barker. After scoring seven victories in Italy, Hilborn died on 26 August 1918, of injuries received in a flying accident.

== Early life ==
William Carrall Hilborn was born on 5 July 1898 in Quesnel, British Columbia, Canada; his middle and family names were later variously given as "Carroll" and "Hillborn". His parents were Josephine Elizabeth and Stephan Lundy Hilborn. William Carrall was the second son; he would come to have six younger siblings. He grew up on his family's ranch and was taught his primary education in a school built by his father. In later years, Stephen Lundy Hilborn would build an in-town house near the nearest high school for his children to live in while receiving their post-primary education.

In 1916, during World War I, William Carrall Hilborn and his older brother Clarence decided to learn to fly so they could join the Royal Flying Corps. They borrowed money towards fees of C$300 each and began training at British Columbia Aviation School Limited in October 1916. When they ran out of money, they returned home. However, they were called for training at Deseronto and graduated in Summer 1917. William enlisted on 23 July 1917, commissioned as a temporary second lieutenant on probation, and embarked on the troopship Scotian for England, all on the same day.

== World War I aviation service ==
Hilborn began advanced training in England at the Central Flying School on 15 August 1917. On 3 October 1917 he was appointed as a flying officer onto the General List, signifying his readiness for deployment as a pilot. He actually graduated from the Central Flying School on 14 October 1917. He was then supposed to have a nasal operation and spend two weeks recovering. He confided to his brother Clarence that he got airsick in anything but straight level flight, and that he expected to become an instructor at Upavon.

However, young William joined 66 Squadron in France on 10 November 1917 just before its transfer to Italy. By December, he was in action in Italy, crashing one of the squadron's Sopwith Camels upon landing because he had lost a wheel to antiaircraft fire. On 24 December, he broke his nose while scuffling with a messmate in a friendly boxing match.

On 1 May 1918 at 0850 hours, Hilborn scored his first aerial victory over Fonzano, Italy; he set an Austro-Hungarian Albatros D.III afire with a burst of machine gun fire at 14,000 feet for his first kill. The Albatros plummeted about 1,000 feet before it came apart. Three days later, Hilborn was one of a flight of four Sopwith Camel pilots who tackled a formation of 14 enemy fighters at 0945 hours. Hilborn destroyed another Albatros D.III, this time over Conegliano. On 11 May 1918 at 1050 hours, while flying as a wingman for famed ace William George Barker, Hilborn destroyed a third Albatros over Torre di Mosto. At noon on 20 May, again flying as Barker's wingman, the young British Columbian destroyed an Austro-Hungarian Berg D.I over Fontane, Italy.

Hilborn would not score his fifth victory until 18 July 1918. At 0807 hours, he destroyed an Albatros D.III over Stoccareddo. Eleven days later at 0740 hours, he would score his final triumph with 66 Squadron, destroying one more Albatros D.III, over Feltre.

On 2 August 1918, Hilborn transferred to 28 Squadron. At 1140 hours on the 12th, he fired 50 rounds into a D.III over Cessalto; the Albatros stalled, Hilborn pumped in another 50 rounds, and the enemy plane broke up at 14,000 feet for Hilborn's final kill. The next day, he transferred to 45 Squadron as the flight commander of C Flight. On 16 August, while practicing night flying, he smashed into a tree on his new home aerodrome of Grosso, fracturing his skull. He died of his injuries on 26 August 1918, and was buried in Plot 6, Row A, Grave 8, Montecchio Precalcino Communal Cemetery Extension, Italy.
