= Christopher McEvoy =

British aviator and flying ace

- Born: 2 January 1899; Hendon, Middlesex, England
- Died: 12 October 1953 (aged 54); Dorking, England
- Relatives: Sir Theodore McEvoy (brother)
- Military career
- Allegiance: United Kingdom
- Branch: British Army; Royal Flying Corps
- Rank: Flight Lieutenant
- Units: No. 66 Squadron RAF; No. 37 (Home Defence) Squadron RAF
- Conflicts: First World War; Second World War
- Awards: Distinguished Flying Cross

Christopher McEvoy, DFC (2 February 1899 – 12 October 1953) was a British aviator and flying ace, credited with nine aerial victories during the First World War.

== Early life ==
Christopher McEvoy was born in Cricklewood, North London on 2 February 1899. He was the first-born son of The Reverend Cuthbert McEvoy and his wife Margaret.

== First World War ==
When old enough, McEvoy joined the Royal Flying Corps. In January 1918, he was assigned to No. 66 Squadron in Italy as a pilot. He was slightly wounded the following month, and hospitalized for a short while. On 30 March 1918, he scored his first aerial victory; by 1 August, he had run his tally of victories to nine. Illness then removed him from the cockpit; he was medically evacuated back to England with dysentery. After recovery, he served in No. 37(Home Defence) Squadron. He was awarded Distinguished Flying Cross, gazetted on 23 September 1918:

A gallant pilot who has destroyed six enemy machines in a few months. He displays great determination in his attacks in high or low flying, and in bombing attacks over the enemy's lines.

== List of aerial victories ==
No.	Date/time	Aircraft	Foe	Result	Location	Notes
1	30 March 1918 @ 1315 hours	Sopwith Camel serial number B7389	Albatros D.III	Driven down out of control	Monte Melatta	
2	4 April 1918 @ 0920 hours	Sopwith Camel s/n B7389	Albatros D.III	Set afire; destroyed	Cismon del Grappa	
3	17 April 1918 @ 1420 hours	Sopwith Camel s/n B7389	Albatros D.III	Destroyed	South of Giacomo	
4	26 May 1918 @ 0615 hours	Sopwith Camel s/n B7353	Reconnaissance plane	Destroyed	Salina	Victory shared with Harold Koch Boysen
5	21 June 1918 @ 0805 hours	Sopwith Camel s/n B5180	Albatros D.V	Driven down out of control	Feltre	
6	4 July 1918 @ 0815 hours	Sopwith Camel s/n D8235	Pfalz D.III	Set afire; destroyed	Northwest of Asiago	
7	21 July 1918 @ 1915 hours	Sopwith Camel s/n B2433	Albatros D.V	Destroyed	Motta di Livenza	
8	1 August 1918 @ 1155 hours	Sopwith Camel s/n B2433	Albatros D.V	Destroyed	South of Mareno-C Tron	
9	1 August 1918 @ 1210 hours	Sopwith Camel s/n B2433	Albatros D.V	Destroyed	Fontaneletto	

== Second World War and beyond ==
McEvoy returned to service in the Second World War, being appointed a temporary pilot officer on probation on 1 September 1939. He served in the rank of flight lieutenant as a codes officer for RAF Coastal Command. It seems likely he got in some cockpit time, as he was still serving as a pilot officer when he surrendered his commission because of illness on 7 September 1940.

Christopher McEvoy died at Dorking, England on 12 October 1953 following a prolonged illness.
