= Walbanke Ashby Pritt =

British flying ace

- Born: 31 January 1897; Leamington Spa, Warwickshire, England
- Died: 27 January 1928 (aged 30); Bagby, Yorkshire, England
- Burial place: Thrickleby, Yorkshire. England
- Military career
- Allegiance: United Kingdom
- Branch: British Army; Royal Air Force
- Service years: 1916–1920
- Rank: Lieutenant
- Units: No. 66 Squadron RFC; No. 44 Squadron RFC
- Conflicts: World War I • Western Front
- Awards: Military Cross

Lieutenant Walbanke Ashby Pritt, MC (31 January 1897 – 27 January 1928) was a British First World War flying ace credited with five aerial victories.

== Early life ==
Pritt was born and grew up in Leamington Spa, Warwickshire, the son of Walter Charles Ashby Pritt, a cotton factor (commission merchant), and his wife Marguerite Bianca Selina Pritt. His army records indicate that he attended St Peter's School in York from September 1909 to February 1916. He passed the entrance exams for Sandhurst in February 1916, but was rejected for officer training as being too small.

== First World War ==
After being rejected by Sandhurst he opted to try flying. On 16 September 1916 Pritt passed his Royal Aero Club flying test and was awarded Aviators' Certificate No. 3564, after soloing a Caudron at the Wallisdown School in Bournemouth, and was then accepted by the Royal Flying Corps for flying training as a cadet. He underwent training at the Cadet School at Denham and No. 2 School of Military Aeronautics at Oxford.

Commissioned as a temporary second lieutenant (on probation) on the General List for service on the RFC on 4 March 1917. he was then posted to No. 41 Reserve Squadron and No. 15 Reserve Squadron where he gained his RFC wings, and was appointed a flying officer on 2 June 1917. He was then posted to No. 40 Reserve Squadron, and on 4 July 1917 was sent to France where he joined No. 66 Squadron.

During the five-month period, 4 July to 14 November 1917, while flying Sopwith Pups with No. 66 Squadron Pritt became an ace, officially credited with five aircraft destroyed; there is evidence of a possible sixth victory. He was also awarded the Military Cross on 26 September 1917. His citation read:

Temporary Second Lieutenant Walbanke Ashby Pritt, General List and Royal Flying Corps.

"For conspicuous gallantry and devotion to duty in attacking a hostile aerodrome with exceptional dash and determination. Having reached his objective and dropped bombs from a very low altitude, he then attacked and destroyed two hostile machines almost as soon as they had left the ground. A machine-gun then opened upon him from the aerodrome, which he immediately attacked. Both on his outward and homeward journey he was under very heavy machine-gun and anti-aircraft fire. On another occasion he attacked a motor-car, and shot one of the occupants from about 50 feet, afterwards attacking infantry on the march and inflicting severe casualties upon them. He has at all times shown constant gallantry and fine offensive spirit."

On 15 February 1918 Pritt was injured while flying Sopwith Camel (B7332) of No. 44 Squadron; he had an engine failure at 500 feet over Hainault Farm, flying downwind he stalled and spun in.

== Post war ==
On 19 April 1920 Pritt was granted a Short Service Commission in the RAF with the rank of flying officer. In August 1920, he failed the RAF Flight Instructor Course at the Central Flying School. The accompanying note states "did not take exams, absent sick, CFS cat B, graded unsuitable as instructor at present". He resigned his commission on 8 December 1920, but was denied permission to retain his rank because of "unsatisfactory dealings with cheques".

On 15 April 1921 Pritt was commissioned as a temporary lieutenant in the 5th Battalion, West Yorkshire Regiment, part of the Territorial Army.

Pritt was married in 1925. There is no record of any children and his wife was still referred to as Mrs. Pritt until her death in 1965. Records indicate Pritt was a commercial artist and poultry farmer until his death on 27 January 1928 at the age of 30 in an automobile accident near Bagby in North Yorkshire.
