= Harold Eycott-Martin =

British pilot

- Born: Harold Ross Eycott-Martin; 2 January 1897; Upper Norwood, London, England
- Military career
- Allegiance: United Kingdom
- Branch: British Army; Royal Air Force
- Service years: 1915–1920
- Rank: Captain
- Units: Royal Engineers; No. 41 Squadron RFC; No. 66 Squadron RFC/RAF
- Awards: Military Cross

Captain Harold Ross Eycott-Martin MC (2 January 1897 – date of death unknown) was a British pilot in the First World War. He began and ended his military career in the Royal Engineers. While seconded for duty with the Royal Air Force, he would win a Military Cross in the well-known air action in Italy in which Alan Jerrard won his Victoria Cross. Eycott-Martin would end the war as a flying ace credited with eight aerial victories. In the aftermath of the war, he would fall into disgrace. After being declared bankrupt, he would desert the Engineers and be ejected from the army.

== Early life ==
Harold Ross Eycott-Martin was born in Upper Norwood, London. He was the eldest son. His father was a civil servant in Bechuanaland. His mother's home residence in England was Lindfield, West Sussex, near Haywards Heath.

== World War I ==
Eycott-Martin was commissioned on 27 October 1915, at the age of 18, as a second lieutenant in the Royal Engineers from the Royal Military Academy, Woolwich. After being seconded to the Royal Flying Corps, he was appointed a flying officer on 29 March 1917. In May 1917, he was posted to 41 Squadron in northern France. A week after joining the squadron, he crashed a Royal Aircraft Factory FE.8 during takeoff. On 24 May 1917, Flight Newsletter reported Eycott-Martin had wounded, but no date was given for the wounding. It seems likely he was injured in the takeoff accident. On 1 July 1917, Eycott-Martin was promoted to lieutenant in his home unit, the Royal Engineers.

On 7 February 1918, he was reassigned to 66 Squadron in Italy. In short order, he won his first two aerial victories. Then, on 30 March 1918, he and Alan Jerrard were wingmen to Peter Carpenter on the well-known occasion when Jerrard won his Victoria Cross. In that same action, Eycott-Martin was credited with two victories; on 5 April 1918, he was subsequently awarded a Military Cross for his role in this combat.

Eycott-Martin's victory string culminated at eight on 22 June 1918. On 13 July, he was temporarily promoted to captain; he almost certainly simultaneously became a flight commander.

Eycott-Martin's MC was finally gazetted on 16 September 1918. His citation read:

Lt. Harold Ross Eycott-Martin, R.E., R.A.F.
For conspicuous gallantry and devotion to duty. In a patrol with two other machines he attacked nineteen of the enemy. Of the six enemy aircraft destroyed on this occasion he destroyed two. On two other occasions he destroyed an enemy machine.

List of aerial victories
No.	Date/time	Aircraft	Foe	Result	Location	Notes
1	21 February 1918 @ 0710 hours	Sopwith Camel; Serial number B5623	Aviatik two-seater	Destroyed	Northeast of Motta, Italy	
2	21 March 1918 @ 1255 hours	Sopwith Camel s/n B7283	Berg D.I	Destroyed	Portobuffolé Aerodrome, Italy	
3	30 March 1918 @ 1140 hours	Sopwith Camel s/n B7283	Albatros D.III	Destroyed	Mansuè, Italy	Alan Jerrard won VC on this occasion
4	30 March 1918 @ 1151 hours	Sopwith Camel s/n B7283	Albatros D.III	Destroyed	Mansuè, Italy	Eycott-Martin also won the MC on this occasion
5	10 May 1918 @ 1050 hours	Sopwith Camel s/n B7283	Albatros D.V	Destroyed	Southwest of Caldonazzo, Italy	
6	26 May 1918 @ 0925 hours	Sopwith Camel s/n B7283	Berg D.I	Destroyed	Southwest of Feltre, Italy	
7	15 June 1918 @ 0820 hours	Sopwith Camel s/n D9390	Hansa-Brandenburg C.I	Set afire in midair; destroyed	Feltre Aerodrome	
8	22 June 1918 @ 1555 hours	Sopwith Camel s/n B7283	Hansa-Brandenburg C.I	Set afire in midair; destroyed	Bassano, Italy	

== Post World War I ==
Eycott-Martin remained in the Royal Air Force post-war, but had a turbulent career. On 17 January 1919, he reverted from temporary captain back to lieutenant. From 27 January to 30 April, he was re-employed as a temporary captain. On 27 June 1919, he was re-rated from lieutenant (Ad.) to lieutenant (A.) On 14 October 1919, he gave up his commission in the Royal Air Force; however, he retained his commission in the Royal Engineers.

In the midst of this career turmoil, on 10 April 1919, it was announced that he was engaged to marry Muriel Horner. They were married at the parish church of St George Hanover Square on 12 June 1919.

On 14 May 1920, Harold Ross Eycott-Martin—mistakenly characterised as still an RAF officer—was reported as residing at 9 Trebovir Road, Earls Court, London, as well as the Maiden Head Hotel, Uckfield, Sussex. This information was contained in a declaration of bankruptcy.

On 10 May 1920, he arrived at New York City aboard the Philadelphia.

On 5 August 1920, Lieutenant Eycott-Martin was removed from the rolls of the Royal Engineers for being absent without leave. He then disappeared into the mists of history.

== Bibliography ==
- Shores, Christopher F.; Franks, Norman & Guest, Russell F. (1990). Above the Trenches: a Complete Record of the Fighter Aces and Units of the British Empire Air Forces 1915–1920. London, UK: Grub Street. ISBN 978-0-948817-19-9.
