= Augustus Paget (RAF officer) =

British flying ace

- Born: 1898; Bromham, Wiltshire, England
- Died: 30 October 1918 (aged 19–20) †; Fontanafredda, Italy
- Burial place: Fontanafredda Communal Cemetery, Pordenone, Italy; 45°58′46″N 12°34′50″E
- Military career
- Allegiance: United Kingdom
- Branch: British Army; Royal Air Force
- Rank: Second Lieutenant
- Unit: No. 66 Squadron RAF
- Conflicts: World War I • Italian front
- Awards: Distinguished Flying Cross

For the British diplomat, see Augustus Paget.

Second Lieutenant Augustus Paget DFC (1898 – 30 October 1918) was a British World War I flying ace credited with six aerial victories.

== Biography ==
=== Early life ===
Augustus Paget was one of 13 children born to George Lewis Paget (1848-1931), of Kenilworth Farm, Bromham, Wiltshire, and his wife Harriet Miriam.

=== Military service ===
Paget served in the 27th Territorial Reserve Battalion, before transferring to the Royal Flying Corps. On 10 September 1917 he was sent to the 1st Officer Cadet Wing for basic military training. He attended No. 1 School of Military Aeronautics from 13 October, and No. 2 School of Military Aeronautics from 2 November. From cadet he was commissioned as a temporary second lieutenant (on probation) on 1 January 1918.

On 2 February 1918, he was assigned to No. 35 Wing, and posted to No. 1 Training Depot Station. He was transferred to No. 63 Training Depot Station on 20 March, and was confirmed in his rank on 25 May. Paget was posted to No. 2 Flying School on 24 June, and on 10 August was assigned to No. 14 Wing, and on 15 August to No. 66 Squadron in Italy.

He gained his first aerial victory on 15 September when he destroyed a Berg D.I north-east of Feltre. On 25 October he was credited with two Hansa-Brandenburg C.I reconnaissance aircraft driven down out of control west of Feltre, one solo, and one shared with Lieutenant Darrell Joseph Tepoorten. On 27 October he destroyed an observation balloon, and the next day shot down in flames two Albatros D.V fighters over Godega aerodrome. On 30 October his aircraft was shot down over Fontanafredda by anti-aircraft fire, and he was killed.

=== Legacy ===
Paget is buried in the Communal Cemetery in Fontanafredda, and is also commemorated, alongside his older brothers Edwin and Colin, on a memorial plaque at Saint Nicholas' Church at Bromham.

Paget's award of the Distinguished Flying Cross was gazetted posthumously on 1 January 1919.
