= Sutton Valence School =

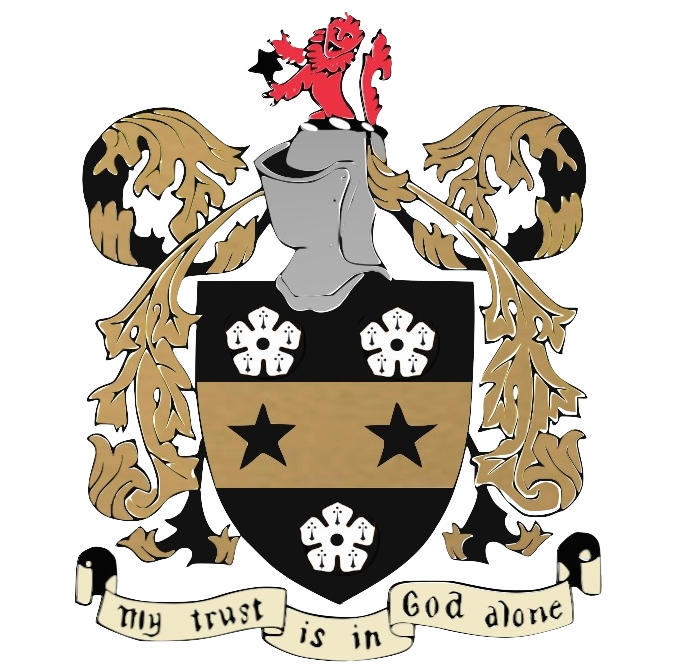

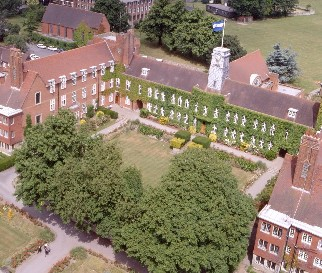

Location
- Maidstone, Kent, ME17 3HL; England; 51.2145°N 0.5935°E

Information
- Type: Independent school
- Motto: My trust is in God alone
- Religious affiliation: Anglican
- Established: 1576; 450 years ago
- Founder: William Lambe
- Chair: Gillian Swaine
- Headmaster: James Thomas
- Gender: Coeducational
- Age: 2 to 18
- Houses: 3 boarding houses
- Colours: Blue, black and silver
- Publication: The Suttonian; The Young Suttonian; The Old Suttonian
- Alumni: Old Suttonians
- Expired Motto: Latin: Floreat Suttona (Let Sutton flourish)
- Website: www.svs.org.uk

Sutton Valence School (SVS) is a private school near Maidstone in southeast England. It has 560 pupils. It is a co-educational day and boarding school. There are three senior boarding houses: Westminster, St Margaret's and Sutton.

== History ==
The school was founded in 1576 as the Free Grammar School of William Lambe in Sutton Valence, by William Lambe, Master of the Worshipful Company of Clothworkers and a member of the Chapel Royal of Henry VIII. It remained under the control of the Worshipful Company of Clothworkers until 1910 when it was taken under the control of United Westminster Schools, a charitable trust which also incorporates Emanuel School and Westminster City School in London and more recently combined with Grey Coat Hospital and Queen Anne's School as The United Westminster and Grey Coat Foundation.

In 1983, the school became co-educational and in 1995 it incorporated Underhill Preparatory School. It is now a co-educational day and boarding school catering for pupils from two to eighteen years of age. It has local and overseas pupils.

The school has gone through renovation and expansion, building a new maths block, theatre, indoor swimming pool, second astro pitch and an all-weather track and field facility. The sports hall is dedicated to Sydney Wooderson, a former pupil and Olympic athlete who held the world record for the mile.

== Boarding houses ==
On 21 July 1911, the Archbishop of Canterbury, Randall Davidson, opened the new buildings, comprising the Main School and the St Margaret's, or Headmaster's Wing. The Westminster Wing was still under construction. The site had previously been leased to the school by the Filmer family as a playing field before the acquisition of the 'Upper' and subsequently used as the village recreation ground. It has been purchased outright by a Master of the Clothworkers’, W. E. Horne, and presented to the new governing body.

Upper School houses derive their names from the City of Westminster Schools Association. Leslie Bridges, the first housemaster of Westminster lent his name to the nickname of "Ponts". St Margaret's is named after the Westminster Parish Church, dedicated to St Margaret of Antioch.

House name	House colour	Colours
Westminster		Black and silver
St Margarets		Black and maroon
Sutton		Black and gold

== CCF ==
The CCF and the Duke of Edinburgh's Award Scheme (DofE) are for pupils in Year 9 and above. CCF courses are supplemented by termly field days offering overnight camps, exercises and adventure training. DofE members undertake service in the community and expeditions. Pupils in Year 10 and Year 11 can opt out of this provision and study for a creative subject in GCSE. The CCF meets on a Wednesday afternoon. Each afternoon is started by a Contingent parade outside the School's Cornwallis Building. The CCF train on Field Days at military bases. Sutton Valence School CCF is affiliated to the Princess of Wales's Royal Regiment.

== Coat of arms ==
School uses coat of arms of the founder William Lambe and the motto of the Worshipful Company of Clothworkers.

- Coat of arms blazoned: Sable, on a fess Or, between three pierced cinquefoil ermine, two mullets sable.
- Motto: My Trust is in God Alone

== Buildings ==
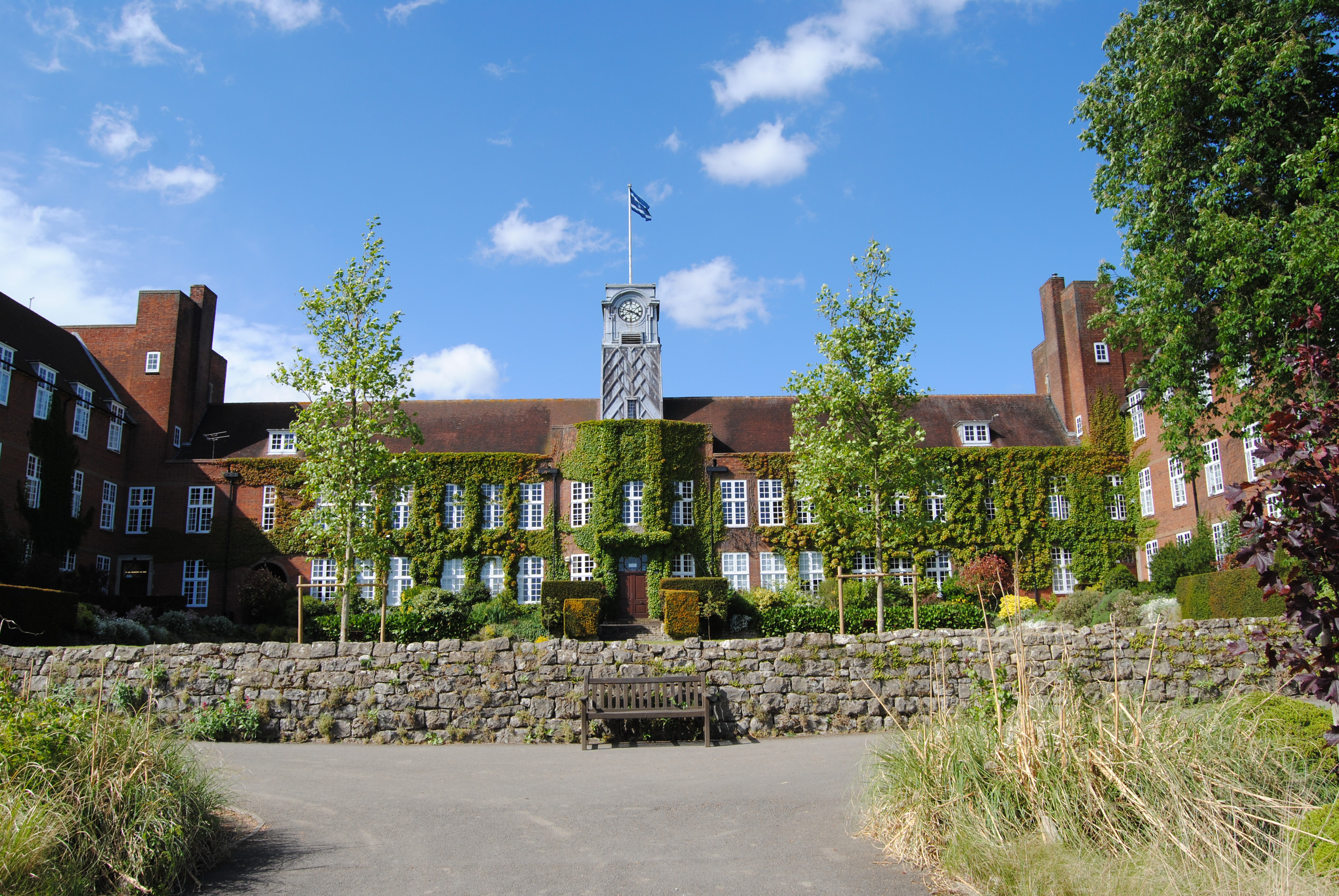
Centre block

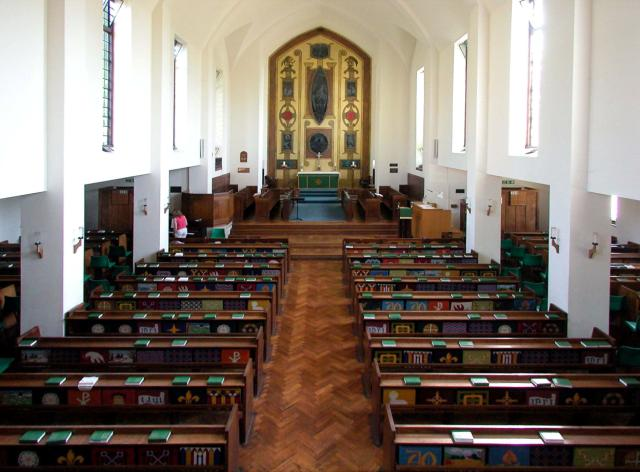
School Chapel inside

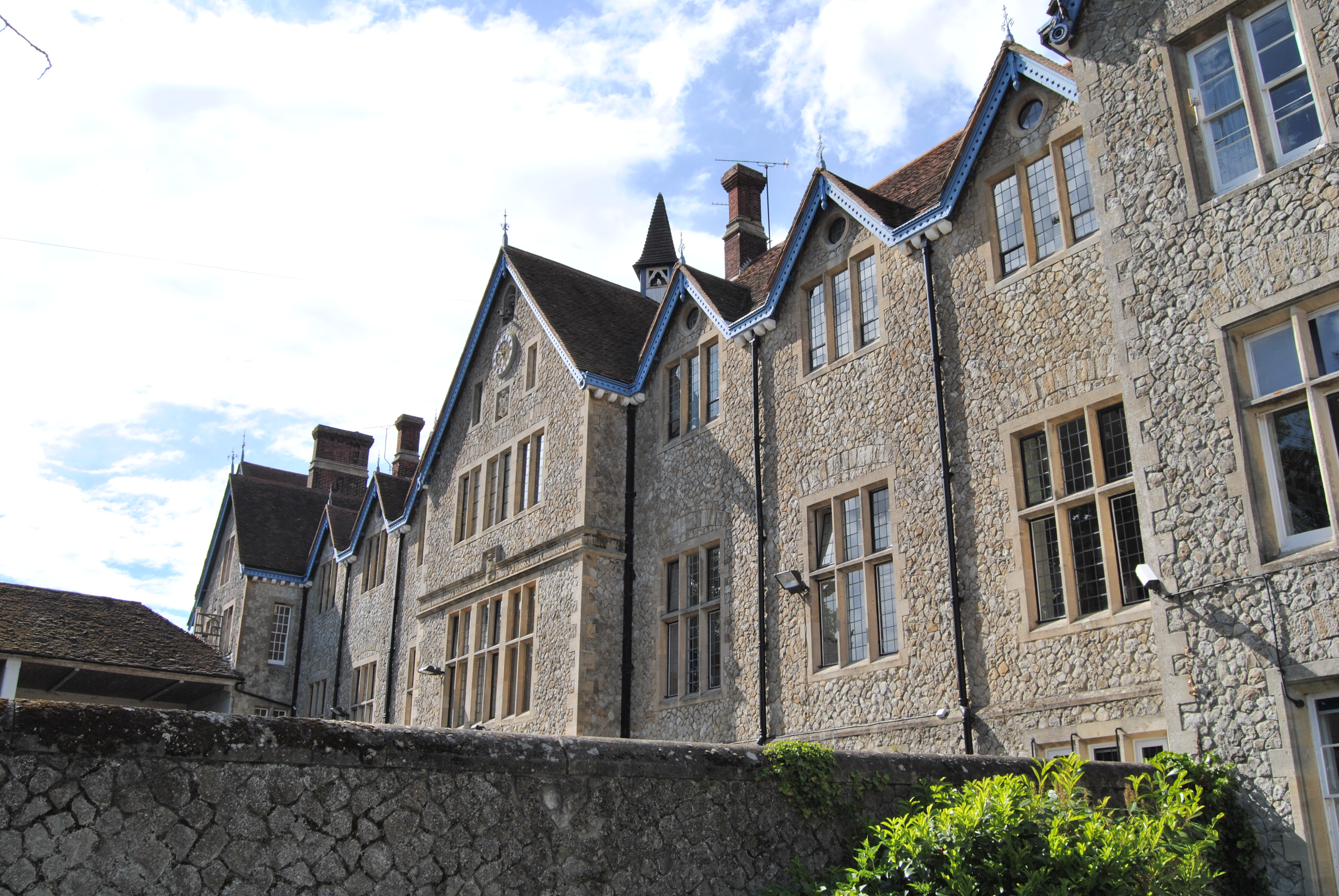
The Lambe's building

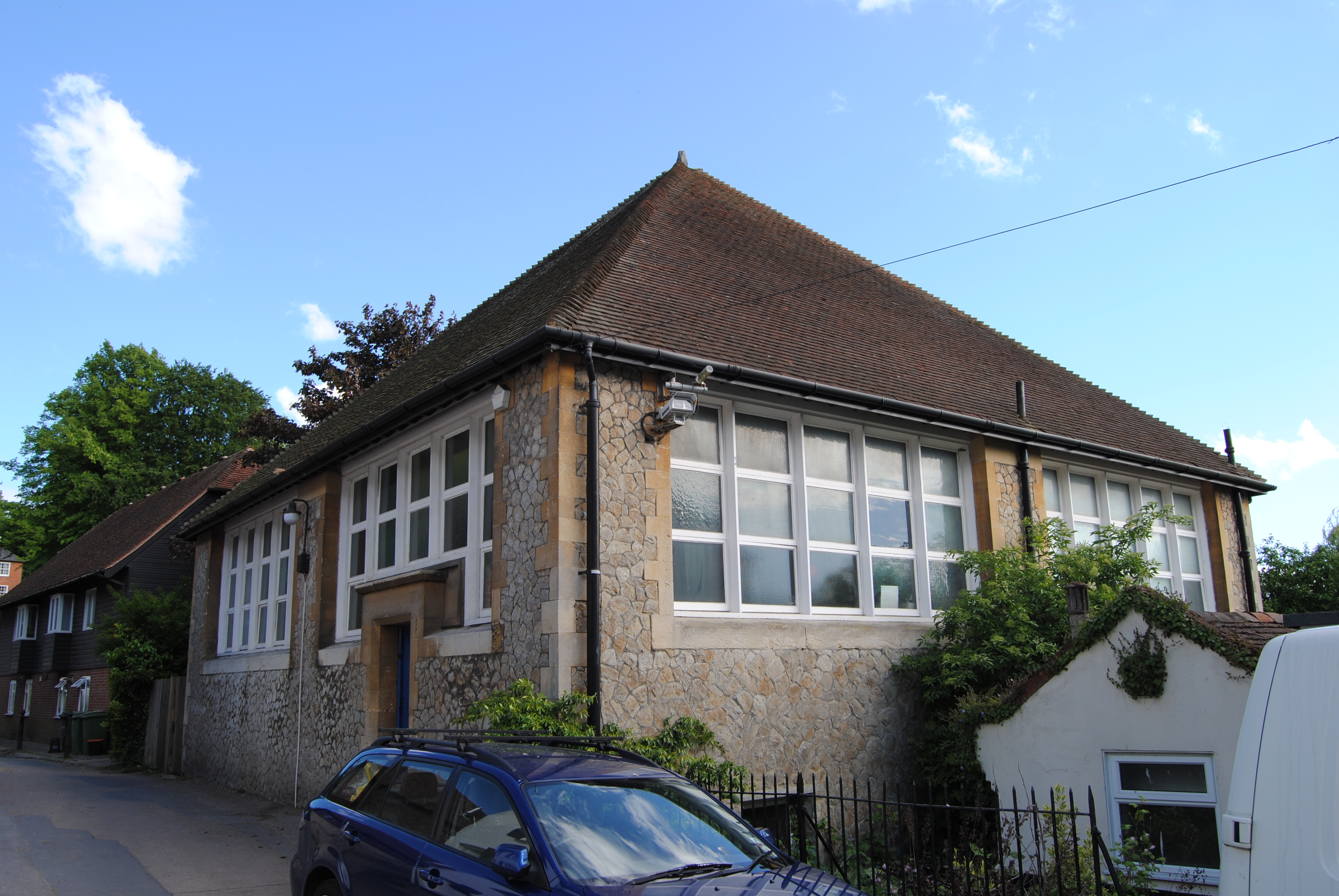
Design and Technology Centre

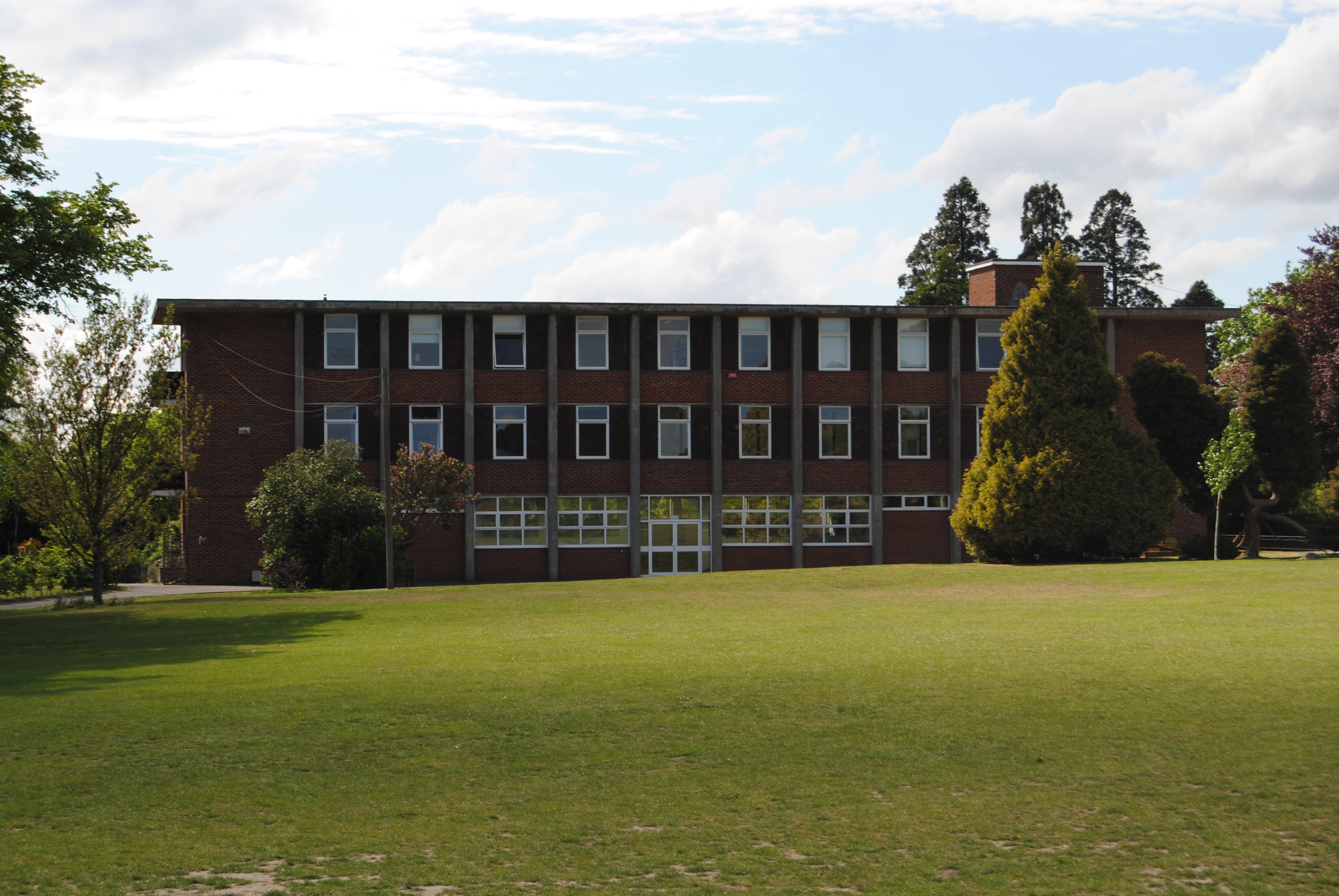
Baron Cornwallis building

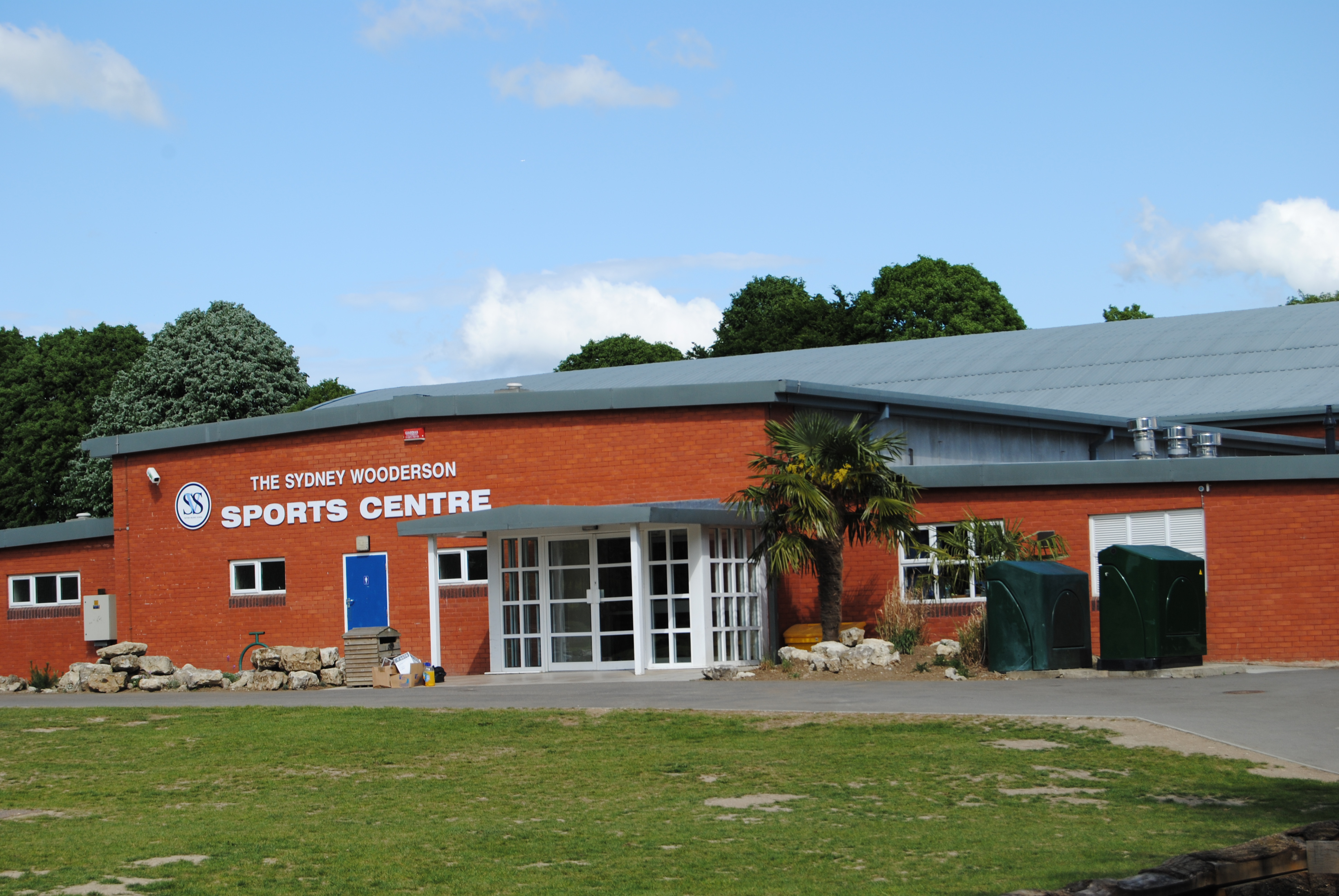
Sydney WoodersonSport Centre

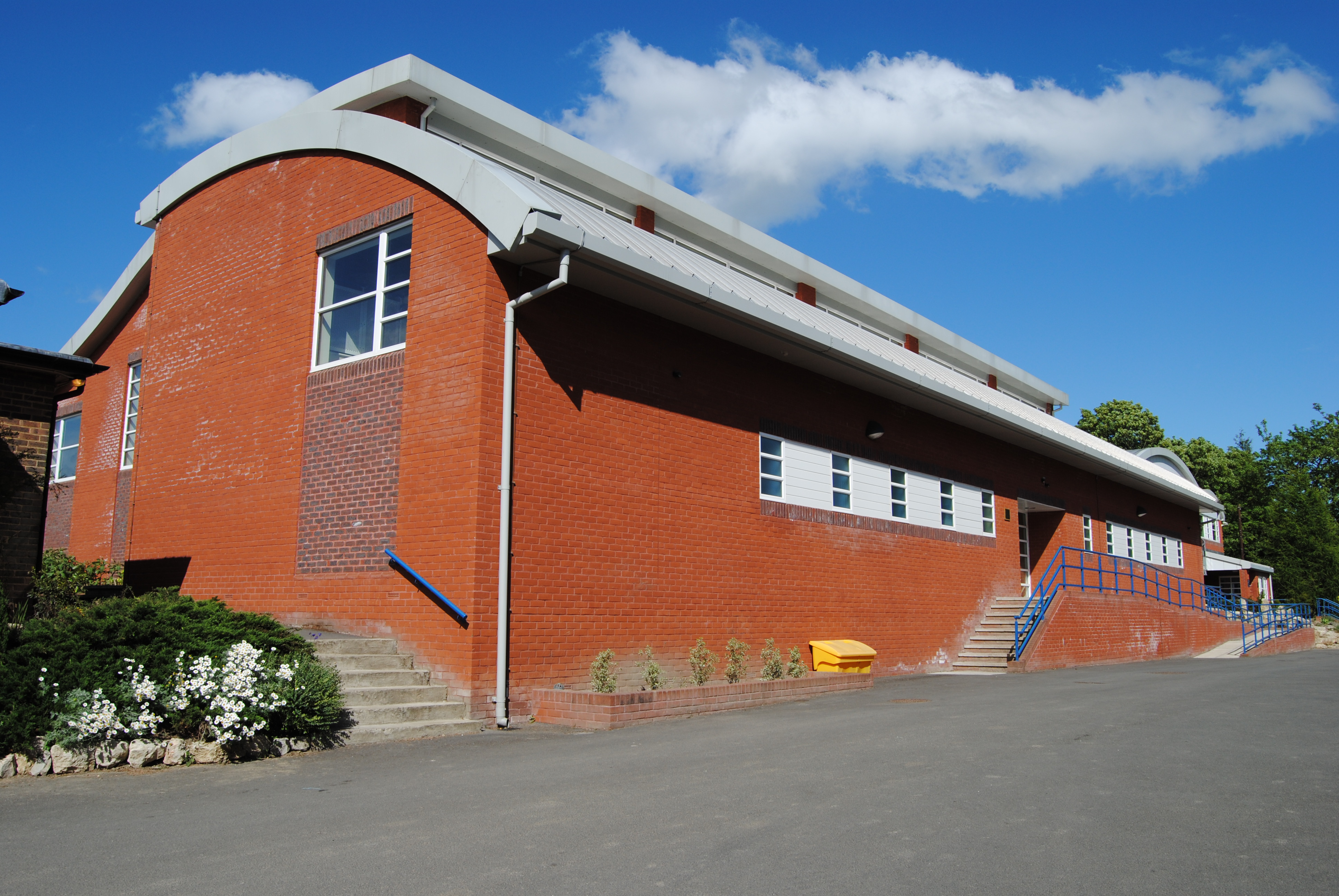
Swimming pool

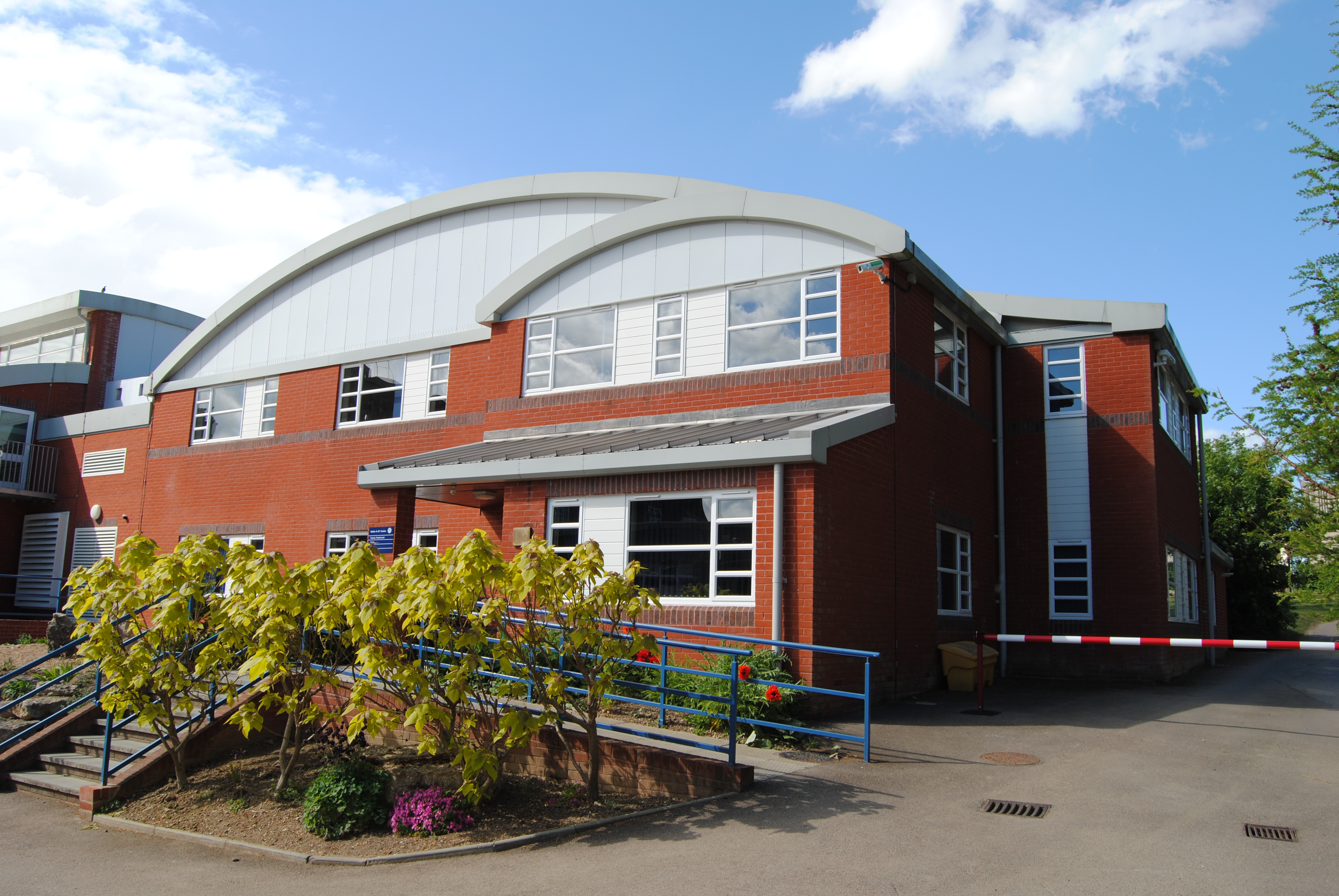
Maths and ICT block

== Notable alumni ==
- Jon Brewer English documentary director and producer who was formerly a manager of rock music acts and artists
- Terence Cuneo CVO, OBE, RGI, FGRA painter
- Sir Charles Groves, CBE conductor
- Rev Alec Vidler, Anglican priest, theologian and Dean of King's College, Cambridge
- Paul Anderson, OBE, GB Olympic sailor
- Gordon Apps, DFC, World War I flying ace
- Ajahn Amaro (Jeremy Horner), Abbot, Amaravati buddhist monastery
- Cecil W Bacon, illustrator
- Ali Bongo, magician
- Ashley Jackson, GB Olympic hockey player Member of Bronze medal-winning England men's hockey team, Commonwealth Games 2014
- Ben Brown, BBC journalist
- Joseph Friedman, inventor of the flexible drinking straw
- John Howard Churchill, Dean of Carlisle (1973–1987)
- Mark Benson, England and Kent County cricket captain and ICC Elite umpire
- Sir Reginald Champion, Governor of Aden
- John Ellis, a flying ace of the Second World War
- Peter Fairley, TV science journalist
- Peter Polycarpou, actor and musician
- Robbie Joseph, Kent cricket player
- Robert Fisk, journalist
- Sydney Wooderson, Olympic athlete and world record holder
- Susannah Townsend, GB hockey player, member of Gold medal-winning GB women's hockey team, Rio Olympic Games 2016
- Reginald Fulljames, aviator, cricketer, Military Cross recipient
- Jack Gannon, cricketer and British Army officer
- David Foster, cricketer
- James Friend, cinematographer
