= Gallio, Veneto =

Gallio
- Comune
- Comune di Gallio
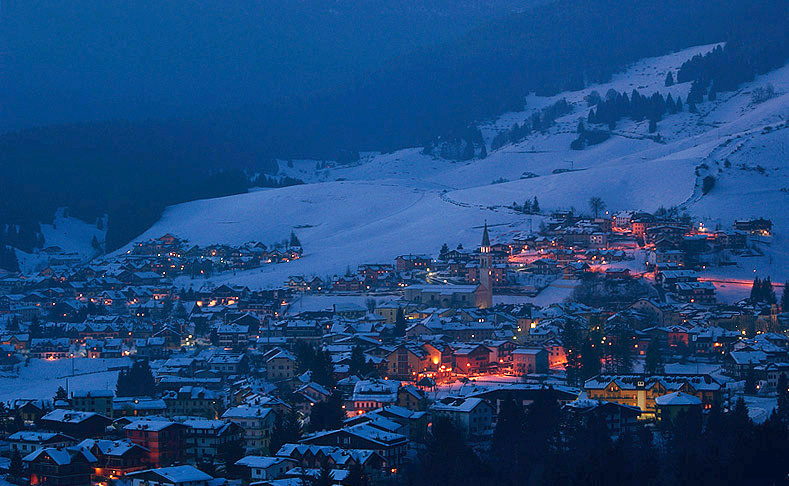
- Gallio in winter

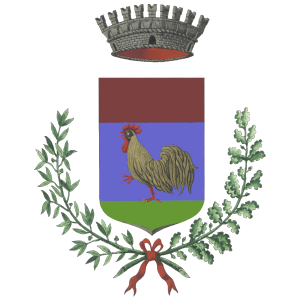
- Coat of arms

- Location within Italy Location within Veneto
- Coordinates: 45°53′N 11°33′E
- Country: Italy
- Region: Veneto
- Province: Vicenza (VI)
- Frazioni: Stoccareddo

Area
  - Total: 47 km^{2} (18 sq mi)
- Elevation: 1,093 m (3,586 ft)

Population (2018-01-01)
  - Total: 2,331
  - Density: 50/km^{2} (130/sq mi)
- Time zone: UTC+1 (CET)
  - Summer (DST): UTC+2 (CEST)
- Postal code: 36032
- Dialing code: 0424
- ISTAT code: 024042
- Website: Official website

Gallio (Cimbrian: Ghèl) is a town in the province of Vicenza, Veneto, Italy. It is on SP76. As of 2007 Gallio had an estimated population of 2,454.

The town is home to mountain slopes popular with skiers, and a 70-meter ski jump, which has been used in international ski jumping competitions.

== Sources ==
- (Google Maps)
