= No. 66 Squadron RAF =

Defunct flying squadron of the Royal Air Force

- Active: 30 June 1916 – 25 October 1919; 20 July 1936 – 30 April 1945; 1 Sept 1946 – 30 September 1960; 15 Sept 1961 – 20 March 1969
- Country: United Kingdom
- Branch: Royal Air Force
- Mottos: Latin: Cavete praemonui ("Beware, I have warned")
- Battle honours: Western Front, 1917*; Arras 1917; Messines, 1917; Ypres, 1917; Italian Front & Adriatic, 1917–18*; Channel & North Sea, 1939–44*; Dunkerque; France & Low Countries, 1940*; Battle of Britain 1940*; Home Defence, 1940–44; Fortress Europe 1940–44*; Dieppe; Normandy, 1944*; France & Germany, 1944–45*; Walcheren; The honours marked with an asterisk (*) are emblazoned on the Squadron Standard.

Insignia
- Squadron Badge: A rattlesnake The rattlesnake typifies aggressive spirit and striking power
- Squadron Codes: RB (Sept 1938 – Sept 1939); LZ (1939–1945 and 1949–1951); HI (1946–1949)
- Roundel (1950–)

No. 66 Squadron was a Royal Flying Corps and eventually Royal Air Force aircraft squadron.

== History ==
=== World War I ===
The squadron was first formed at RAF Filton, Bristol, on 30 June 1916 as a training squadron equipped with Royal Aircraft Factory BE2, BE12s and the Avro 504. The squadron received its first Sopwith Pup on 3 February 1917, and deployed to Vert Galant aerodrome (between Talmas and Beauval) in the Somme département, France on 12 March 1917. The Pups were exchanged for Sopwith Camels during October 1917 and the squadron moved to join No. 14 Wing on the Italian front.

During twelve months of fighting in Italy the squadron destroyed 172 enemy aircraft. On 13 March 1918 Lieutenant Alan Jerrard engaged nineteen enemy aircraft on his own; he managed to destroy three before he was forced to land and taken prisoner. He was awarded the squadron's only Victoria Cross for his efforts.

At the end of the war the squadron stayed on in Italy for a few months, returning to the United Kingdom in March 1919 and was disbanded on 25 October 1919.

=== Flying aces ===
The 21 aces who had served with the squadron during the Great War were: William George Barker VC, Alan Jerrard VC, Peter Carpenter, Harry King Goode, Francis S. Symondson, Gerald Alfred Birks, Charles M. Maud, Gordon Apps, Hilliard Brooke Bell, Christopher McEvoy, Harold Ross Eycott-Martin, William Myron MacDonald, Augustus Paget, John Oliver Andrews, Harold Koch Boysen, William Carrall Hilborn, Thomas Hunter, James Lennox, Walbanke Ashby Pritt, Patrick Gordon Taylor and, John (Jack) Wallis Bishop.

=== Second World War ===
The squadron was reformed on 20 July 1936 from 'C' Flight, No. 19 Squadron RAF at RAF Duxford, initially being equipped with Gloster Gauntlets, before a slow conversion to Supermarine Spitfires from August 1938. The squadron was part of No. 12 Group RAF in Fighter Command and was on readiness from the start of the war in September 1939. The first contact with the enemy was an attack on a Heinkel He 111 of the Norfolk coast near Cromer, the German aircraft subsequently crashed in Denmark. The squadron moved to RAF Horsham St. Faith after Germany's invasion of Belgium and the Netherlands, the squadron destroyed its first enemy aircraft on 12 May 1940 over the Hague. At the end of August the squadron moved to the south of England as part of the Battle of Britain, it operated from RAF Kenley, RAF Gravesend, RAF West Malling and by November to RAF Biggin Hill. By the time the Germans had stopped daylight bombing the squadron had destroyed 20 aircraft with another 17 probables and also damaged another fifteen.

It conducted the first of the Rhubarb operations on 20 December 1940, with two Spitfires over Le Touquet.

On the 24th of February 1941 the squadron moved to RAF Exeter, before moving again in April to RAF Perranporth in Cornwall to operate fighter sweep missions over the Channel. It moved to Portreath in December 1941 and re-equipped with the Spitfire V. In April 1942 the squadron moved to RAF Ibsley and was involved in the support for the combined operations at Dieppe. By October 1942 the squadron was based at RAF Zeals in Wiltshire. It moved to RAF Sumburgh in the Shetland Isles in April 1943 to provide fighter cover for the British fleet based at Scapa Flow before returning to the West Country, firstly at RAF Church Stanton in Somerset and then back to Perranporth in Cornwall in October 1943.

In November 1943 the squadron moved to RAF Hornchurch and converted to the Spitfire IX and then moved to North Weald airfield in Essex at the end of February 1944. The squadron became part of the Second Tactical Air Force and provided air cover for the invasion forces in Normandy, being based in France from 22 June. After a break in South Wales the squadron continued to support the advancing allied forces being based at Abbeville in September 1944 and then on to Grimbergen in Belgium. In November the squadron converted to the Spitfire XVI before moving the Twente in the Netherlands where it disbanded on 30 April 1945.

=== Post-war ===
The squadron was reformed at Duxford on 1 September 1946, by renumbering No. 165 Squadron RAF, initially flying Spitfires. The following year, the squadron converted to Meteors, which it flew for six years before re-equipping with Canadair Sabres. At RAF Linton-on-Ouse in March 1956 it acquired Hawker Hunters, which it flew before being disbanded again on 30 September 1960 at RAF Acklington.

=== On helicopters ===
The squadron reformed at RAF Odiham on 15 September 1961, from the Belvedere Trials Unit equipped with Bristol Belvedere helicopters. In June 1962 it left the UK for Seletar in Singapore, where it provided heavy lift helicopter support for forces operating in Malaya. The squadron finally disbanded on 17 March 1969.
