= James Lennox =

British World War I flying ace

James Scott Lennox
- Born: 21 April 1899; Chryston, Lanarkshire, Scotland
- Died: 10 April 1944 (aged 44); Newton Mearns, Strathclyde, Scotland
- Military career
- Allegiance: United Kingdom
- Branch: British Army; Royal Air Force
- Service years: 1917–1919
- Rank: Lieutenant
- Unit: No. 66 Squadron RAF
- Conflicts: World War I • Italian Front
- Awards: Croce di Guerra (Italy)

Lieutenant James Scott Lennox (21 April 1899 – 10 April 1944) was a British World War I flying ace credited with five aerial victories.

== Military service ==
Lennox was commissioned from cadet to second lieutenant (on probation) on the General List for service on the Royal Flying Corps on 2 August 1917, and was appointed a flying officer and confirmed in his rank on 12 October 1917.

Lennox was assigned to No. 66 Squadron in Italy on 12 March 1918, flying the Sopwith Camel. He gained his first aerial victory on 20 May, by driving down out of control an Albatros D.V over Alano di Piave. The next day he destroyed another over Moriago. On 15 July he destroyed an Albatros D.III over Levico-Marter, and another D.V south of Biago on 26 August. Finally, on 27 October, he drove down a Type C reconnaissance aircraft south of San Polo di Piave, for a total of three aircraft destroyed and two driven down two others out of control. He then returned to England to serve in the Home Establishment.

Lennox was awarded the Croce di Guerra by the Italian government in February 1919.
