= William Myron MacDonald =

Canadian military pilot

- Born: 3 November 1890; Connecticut, U.S.
- Died: 8 May 1958 (aged 67); San Diego, California, U.S.
- Military career
- Allegiance: Canada; United Kingdom
- Branch: Canadian Expeditionary Force; Royal Flying Corps
- Rank: Lieutenant
- Unit: No. 66 Squadron RAF
- Awards: Distinguished Flying Cross

Lieutenant William Myron MacDonald was an American-born Canadian flying ace. He was credited with eight confirmed victories during World War I while flying as a wingman to Victoria Cross winner William George Barker.

== Early life ==
William Myron MacDonald was born in Connecticut, USA on 3 November 1890. His family moved to Vancouver, British Columbia in 1893. MacDonald was working as a marine motor engineer in Vancouver when he enlisted in the Canadian Expeditionary Force. Upon enlistment, he was a bachelor; his next of kin was Catherine MacDonald. However, as his attestation paper is missing, his actual date of enlistment is unknown; his Canadian citizenship also becomes questionable, as he is not known to have sworn allegiance to the Crown.

== World War I ==
MacDonald began his military hitch in the motor transport segment of the Army Service Corps. He served in this mundane assignment for more than two years, most of it overseas duty. In August 1917, he was commissioned into the Royal Flying Corps. By March 1918, he was trained as a fighter pilot and posted to No. 66 Squadron in Italy as a Sopwith Camel pilot. While assigned to 66 Squadron, MacDonald flew as a wingman for William George Barker, the great Canadian ace. MacDonald was credited with destroying eight enemy airplanes between 24 May and 15 August 1918. This feat earned him the Distinguished Flying Cross, awarded on 20 August 1918 and gazetted on 2 November 1918:

"Lt. William Myron Macdonald.

"A very gallant and determined officer, who never hesitates to attack the enemy however superior in numbers the latter may be. On a recent occasion he engaged, single-handed, five scouts, destroying two, both of which crashed. In all he has accounted for seven machines."

== List of aerial victories ==
No.	Date/time	Aircraft	Foe	Result	Location
1	24 May 1918, 1905 hours	Sopwith Camel serial number B7358	LVG two-seater	Destroyed	Stradatta aerodrome
2	31 May 1918, 0930 hours	Sopwith Camel s/n B6424	Berg D.I fighter	Destroyed	Southeast of Nerversa
3	10 June 1918, 0610 hours	Sopwith Camel s/n D1913	Berg D.I fighter	Destroyed	Between Giaron and Cismon del Grappa
4	10 June 1918, 0625 hours	Sopwith Camel s/n D1913	Albatros D.III fighter	Destroyed	Seren
5	5 August 1918, 1310 hours	Sopwith Camel s/n E1496	Enemy two-seater	Destroyed	Maria
6	11 August 1918, 1945 hours	Sopwith Camel s/n E1499	Enemy two-seater	Set afire in midair; destroyed	East of Cassotto
7	15 August 1918, 1010 hours	Sopwith Camel s/n E1499	Albatros D.III fighter	Set afire in midair; destroyed	South of Fonzano
8	15 August 1918, 1015 hours	Sopwith Camel s/n E1499	Albatros D.III fighter	Destroyed	Southwest of Fonzano

== Post-war ==
On 20 April 1919, MacDonald was transferred to the unemployed list of the Royal Air Force, ending his term of service. In 1930, he was known to be living in San Diego, California. He died there on 8 May 1958.

== See also ==
- Aerial victory standards of World War I
