= Harold Koch Boysen =

World War I flying ace

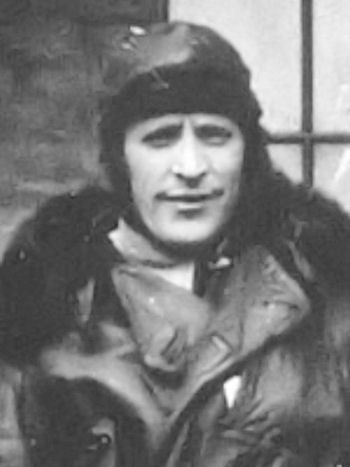
- Harold Koch Boysen, 1918
- Born: 2 November 1891; Lake Benton, Minnesota, United States
- Died: 20 February 1963 (aged 71); Harris County, Texas, USA
- Military career
- Allegiance: United States
- Branch: Royal Air Force (United Kingdom)
- Service years: 1917 - 1918
- Rank: Lieutenant
- Unit: Royal Air Force: No. 66 Squadron RAF
- Conflicts: World War I
- Awards: Silver Medal for Military Valor

Lieutenant Harold Koch Boysen was a World War I flying ace credited with five aerial victories.

Boysen joined the Royal Flying Corps in June 1917. After training, he was assigned to 66 Squadron to fly a Sopwith Pup. He would not have any success until the unit re-equipped with Sopwith Camels and transferred fronts from France to northern Italy. He scored a victory in December 1917. In January 1918, he crashed while landing in a fog, and was injured. Upon recovery, he then scored four more times in May 1918, including one win shared with Lieutenant Christopher McEvoy.

== See also ==
- List of World War I flying aces from the United States
