= David Foster (cricketer, born 1959) =

English cricketer

Personal information
- Full name: David Charles Geoffrey Foster
- Born: 19 September 1959 (age 67); Holbeach, Lincolnshire, England
- Batting: Left-handed
- Bowling: Slow left-arm orthodox

Domestic team information
- Years: Team
- 1980: Oxford University

Career statistics
Competition	First-class
Matches	4
Runs scored	124
Batting average	24.80
100s/50s	–/1
Top score	67
Catches/stumpings	–/–
- Source: Cricinfo, 21 April 2020

David Charles Geoffrey Foster (born 19 September 1959) is an English former first-class cricketer.

Foster was born at Holbeach, Lincolnshire. He was educated at Sutton Valence School, before going up to Christ Church, Oxford. While studying at Oxford, he played first-class cricket for Oxford University in 1980, making four appearances. He scored 124 runs in his four matches, at an average of 24.60 and a high score of 67. After graduating from Oxford he became a solicitor, being admitted in November 1984.
