= Stoccareddo =

- Frazione
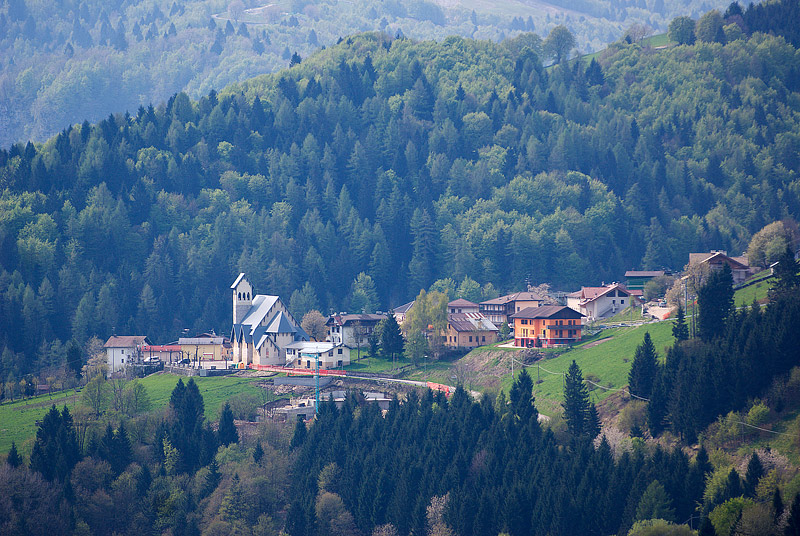

- Location of Stoccareddo in Italy
- Coordinates: 45°52′00″N 11°36′00″E
- Country: Italy
- Region: Veneto
- Province: Vincenza
- Comune: Gallio (VI)
- Elevation: 981 m (3,219 ft)

Population
  - Total: 400
- Time zone: UTC+1 (CET)
  - Summer (DST): UTC+2 (CEST)
- Postal code: 36032
- Dialing code: (+39) 0424
- Patron saint: San Bartolomeo
- Website: Official website

Stoccareddo is a village in the comune of Gallio, Province of Vicenza, Italy. It is known for its 400 villagers (380 of them with the surname Baù) with great health who tend to be able to consume fatty foods without the consequences of strokes and heart attacks. Informally, Stoccareddo is known as "Il paese dei Baù", meaning "The Country of the Baù".

== History and geography ==
Stoccareddo is a secluded village in the Italian Alps that was, until the late 20th century, very isolated. Stoccareddo was first inhabited by a family with the surname Baù about 800 years ago. It was destroyed during World War I, but was rebuilt during the early 1920s by its citizens. Because of its location, the villagers, mainly Baùs, were not able to mingle with any outside citizens. The continuous centuries of seclusion created a gene pool of Baùs that had good health.

== Health phenomenon ==
Almost all of Stoccareddo's villagers have the surname Baù (pronounced [baˈu]), and are all from the same family. Most of Stoccareddo's villagers have phenomenally good health, despite their diet of fried cheeses and other unhealthy Italian delicacies. According to The Independent, 38% of Stoccareddo's men have high cholesterol, as opposed to the Italian average of 21%. However, about 23% of Italian men have low levels of HDL cholesterol as opposed to 5.4% of men in Stoccareddo. Also, hypertension (high blood pressure) affects about 33% of Italian men, but only 6.5% of Stoccareddo men.

== Inbreeding ==
The villagers of Stoccareddo are prominent for inbreeding. Although many Baùs have children with other Baùs, they tend to marry more distant relatives and not first cousins, which can cause genetic defects. There is a local saying, "Only a Baù can understand a Baù." Their inbreeding over a period of over eight centuries is likely to be the reason why many citizens of Stoccareddo are so healthy, despite their unhealthy diet.
