= Peter Carpenter =

Welsh fighter ace in WW I

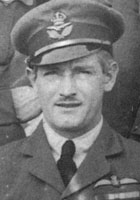
- Born: 6 December 1891; Cardiff, Wales
- Died: 21 March 1971 (aged 79); Golders Green, Middlesex, England
- Military career
- Allegiance: United Kingdom
- Branch: British Army; Royal Air Force
- Service years: 1915–1918
- Rank: Captain
- Units: Public Schools Royal Fusiliers; No. 45 Squadron RAF; No. 66 Squadron RAF
- Awards: Distinguished Service Order; Military Cross & Bar; Bronze Medal for Military Valour (Italy)

Captain Peter Carpenter DSO, MC* (6 December 1891 – 21 March 1971) was a Welsh fighter ace in World War I credited with 24 victories.

== Early life ==
Peter Carpenter was born in Cardiff, Wales, to Peter S. and Jane Carpenter, who had eight other children. The elder Peter Carpenter was a ship's pilot who owned his own boat and worked the Bristol Channel and Western Approaches. Carpenter attended the National School in Grange Town, Cardiff, until age 14. He was a rugby union star at school. He apparently worked for a printer immediately after leaving school. At age 17, he joined Spillers & Baker Company as a clerk; around 1910, he became a representative for them at their Stockport office.

== Infantry service ==
He joined the Public Schools Royal Fusiliers in 1915 and was assigned to 24 Training Battalion as an instructor. He played rugby on his battalion team. He transferred to 19 Battalion and went to France with them as a sergeant on 14 November 1915. He also played for this battalion's rugby team until he broke his leg during a match. He was then transferred to the Home Establishment. From there, he transferred to the Royal Flying Corps, being appointed a probationary temporary second lieutenant on 17 March 1917.

== Flying service ==
Carpenter began his flying career with 5 Reserve Squadron; his first flight was on 21 March 1917. He soloed on 7 April after five hours dual instruction. He moved on to advanced training after accumulating another seven hours 40 minutes stick time. In this phase of training, with 34 Reserve Squadron, he crashed on 11 June after engine failure. He was unhurt. He graduated advanced training with 84 hours flying time, and was assigned to fly a Sopwith Camel with 45 Squadron on 14 September 1917.

On 20 September, he dove on four Albatros D.Vs near Ypres, Belgium, fired 30 rounds at one, and drove it down out of the fight. After a short fight with the other three, he made his exit.

He destroyed his next four opponents, becoming an ace on 15 November.

45 Squadron was then transferred to the Italian Front. Carpenter went with it, and destroyed three more enemy aircraft during January 1918. On 29 January, three days after win number eight, he went on home leave until 20 February.

Upon his return, he was transferred to 66 Squadron as "B Flight" leader, effective 27 February. He marked his first day as a flight leader with his ninth triumph.

On 30 March 1918 his flight, consisting of himself, Harold Ross Eycott-Martin and Alan Jerrard, was involved in the combat that resulted in the Victoria Cross award to Jerrard; Carpenter claiming one of the six Albatros fighters claimed destroyed in this fight (although Austro-Hungarian records indicate three aircraft were only damaged).

His 24 claims consisted of 15 destroyed, 2 shared destroyed, and 7 'out of control'.

== Military honours ==
Military Cross (MC)

T./2nd Lt. Peter Carpenter, Gen. List and R.F.C.

For conspicuous gallantry and devotion to duty. Within a period of the last three months he has brought down six enemy machines, four of which were observed to crash to the ground, the remaining two being shot down completely out of control. The offensive tactics pursued by this daring and skilful officer have produced most successful results.

(M.C. gazetted 4 March 1918.)

Bar to Military Cross

T./Capt. Peter Carpenter, M.C., Gen. List and R.F.C.

For conspicuous gallantry and devotion to duty. He led an offensive patrol against seven of the enemy; three were destroyed. Again he led a patrol of three machines against six of the enemy; two of them were destroyed and one driven down out of control. Later, with two other pilots he engaged twelve hostile machines, of which three were destroyed and one driven down out of control. He shot down several machines himself.

Distinguished Service Order (DSO)

T./Capt. Peter Carpenter, M.C., R.A.F.

For conspicuous gallantry and devotion to duty. He has destroyed nine enemy machines, and driven three down out of control. He has led forty-six offensive patrols. On one occasion twelve enemy aircraft were attacked, and on another he led two other machines against nineteen of the enemy, destroying six of them. He has at all times shown a magnificent example.

Bronze Medal for Military Valour

Lieut. (T./Capt.) Peter Carpenter, D.S.O., M.C.

Conferred by the Government of Italy.

== Post-war career ==
Carpenter founded a shipping company after the war, but it fell victim to the Great Depression, and he took a position as general manager at the London office of the Metropolitan Life Company of New York, later taken over by Legal & General. Carpenter stayed with the company until he retired. During World War II he served in No.13 Company, 20th Battalion, Middlesex Home Guard.

Carpenter died on 21 March 1971.

== Bibliography ==
- Franks, Norman (2003). Sopwith Camel Aces of World War I. London, UK: Osprey Publishing. ISBN 978-1-84176-534-1.
- Shores, Christopher F.; Franks, Norman & Guest, Russell (1990). Above the Trenches: A Complete Record of the Fighter Aces and Units of the British Empire Air Forces 1915–1920. London, UK: Grub Street. ISBN 0-948817-19-4.
