= Alan Jerrard =

English aviator and recipient of the Victoria Cross

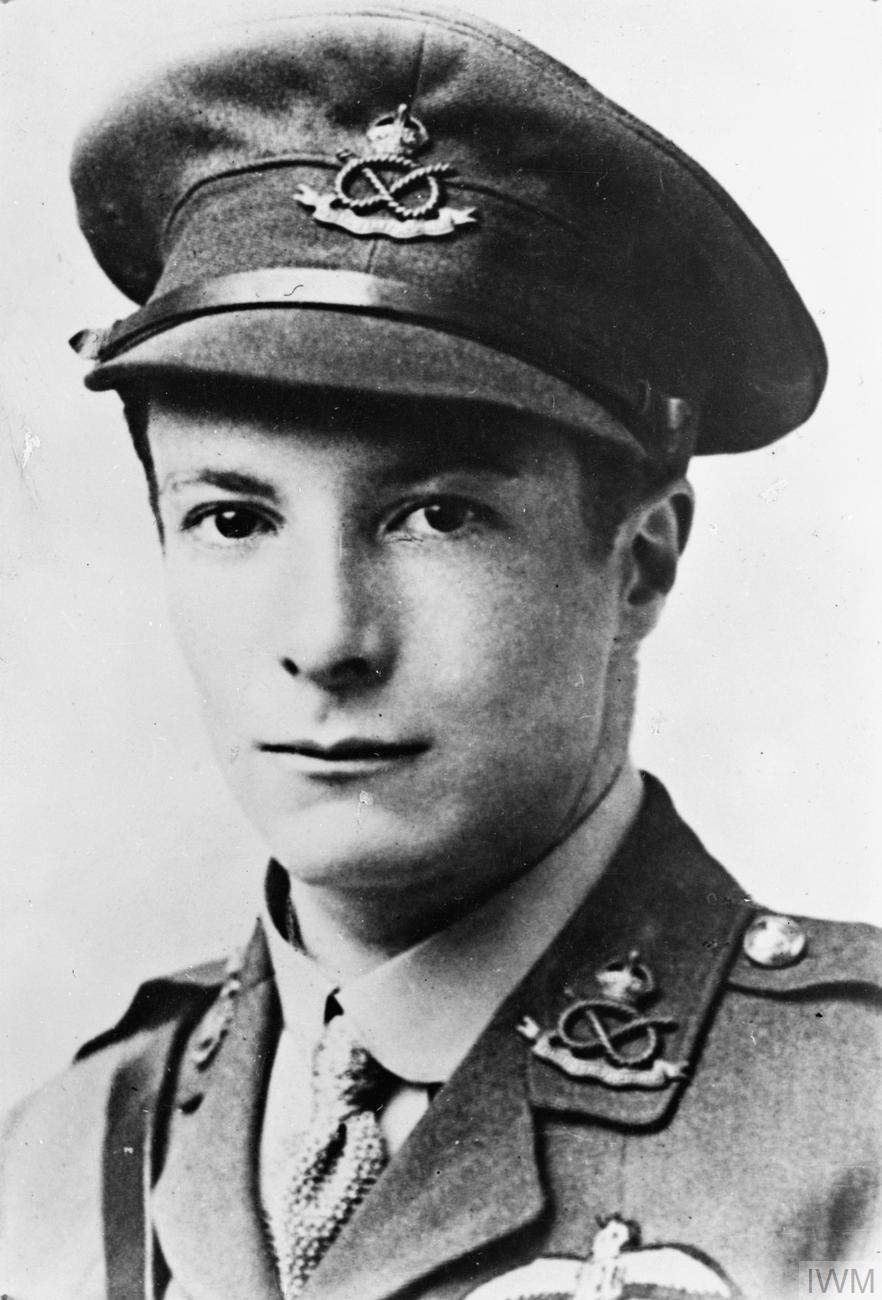
- Jerrard as an officer of the South Staffordshire Regiment
- Born: 3 December 1897; Lewisham, London
- Died: 14 May 1968 (aged 70); Lyme Regis, Devon
- Burial place: Exeter & Devon Crematorium; Headstone at Hillingdon Churchyard
- Military career
- Allegiance: United Kingdom
- Branch: British Army; Royal Air Force
- Service years: 1916–1933
- Rank: Flight Lieutenant
- Units: 5th South Staffordshire Regiment; No. 19 Squadron RFC; No. 66 Squadron RFC
- Conflicts: First World War; Russian Civil War
- Awards: Victoria Cross; Mentioned in Despatches; Bronze Medal of Military Valour (Italy); Order of Saint Anna, 3rd Class (Russia)

Alan Jerrard, VC (3 December 1897 – 14 May 1968) was an English aviator and a recipient of the Victoria Cross, the highest award for gallantry in the face of the enemy that can be awarded to British and Commonwealth forces.

An officer of the South Staffordshire Regiment he was 20 years old when, attached as a lieutenant in No. 66 Squadron of the Royal Flying Corps during the First World War, he performed an act of bravery for which he was awarded the Victoria Cross.

== Early life ==
Jerrard was born in Lewisham in 1897 and moved in 1902 with his family to Sutton Coldfield where his father was headmaster of Bishop Vesey's Grammar School for 24 years . Later Jerrard attended Oundle School in Northamptonshire and Birmingham University.

== First World War ==
Jerrard volunteered for the British Army and served with the 5th South Staffordshire Regiment before transferring to the Royal Flying Corps in 1916, where he trained as a fighter pilot.

From mid-1917, he served in No. 19 Squadron RFC in France, but he was injured in an air crash on 5 August 1917, flying a SPAD VII. From 22 February 1918, he served in No. 66 Squadron RFC in Italy, as a lieutenant, flying Sopwith Camels. Between 27 February and 21 March he scored four aerial victories, including one balloon.

=== Victoria Cross ===
Jerrard was awarded the VC for the following deed:

On 30 March 1918 near Mansuè, Italy, Lieutenant Jerrard, with two other officers, Peter Carpenter and Harold Ross Eycott-Martin, on offensive patrol, shot down one of five enemy aircraft. Then flying at 50 ft. he attacked an aerodrome with some 19 machines either landing or attempting to take off. After destroying one of these he was attacked by more enemy aircraft but, seeing a brother-officer in difficulties, went to assist him, destroying a third enemy machine, then continued his attacks, only retreating, with five machines in pursuit, on the orders of the patrol leader. Even then, he repeatedly turned to beat off the enemy until finally forced down.

After the war records revealed that the Camel's opponents were four Austrian Albatros D.III (Oef) fighters, one of which was damaged and had to land, while another pilot was injured by a bullet. Jerrard was shot down by the ace Benno Fiala von Fernbrugg from Flik 51/J, and became a prisoner of war. Although the RFC credited Jerrard with 3 claims on this date, Jerrard himself did not claim to destroy any planes in that skirmish, only that he claimed to shoot one up. He was the only Camel pilot to be awarded a VC.

Jerrard remained a prisoner until the end of 1918, when he managed to escape and reach Allied lines. He later served in Russia in 1919 and achieved the rank of flight lieutenant.

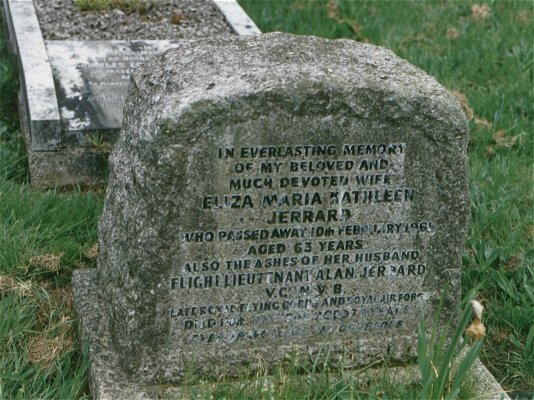
Gravestone of Jerrard's wife and Jerrard's ashes

Jerrard's VC and other medals are displayed on rotation in the Imperial War Museum.
