= List of World War I aces credited with 8 victories =

Eight victory ace Leutnant Otto Parschau was one of two German aces who began the "Fokker Scourge" in 1915. He was awarded the Pour le Mérite shortly before being killed in combat

The term ace (now commonly flying ace) was first used by French newspapers during World War I, describing Adolphe Pégoud as l'as ('the ace'), after he downed five German aircraft. When aircraft began to shoot or force down other aircraft, systems to count "air victories" were subsequently developed. The American qualification of five victories eventually became the standard, even though other air services had previously used differing figures.

While "ace" status was most often won by fighter pilots, bomber and reconnaissance crews, and observers in two-seater aircraft such as the Bristol F.2b ("Bristol Fighter"), also destroyed enemy aircraft. If a two-seater aircraft destroyed an aircraft, both crew members were credited with a victory. Because pilots usually teamed with differing observer/gunners in two-seater aircraft, an observer might be an ace when his pilot was not, and vice versa. The few aces among combat aviators have historically accounted for the majority of air-to-air victories in military history.

Loss of records by mischance and the passage of time complicates reconstructing the actual count for given aces. The scores presented in the list cannot be definitive, but are based on itemized lists that are the best available sources of information. Aces are listed after verifying the date and location of combat, and the foe vanquished, for every victory accredited by an aviator's home air service using their own aerial victory standards. Those victories for which the evidence is unavailable or fragmentary have been excluded from the victory count.

== Aces ==
This list is complete. Notable aces are linked to their biographies.

This along with the symbolic dagger †, indicates that the pilot was known to be either killed in action, missing in action, died of wounds, or killed in a flying accident during World War I.

Name	Country	Air service(s)	Victories
Paul Achilles	German Empire	Luftstreitkräfte	8
John William Aldred	United Kingdom	Royal Flying Corps, Royal Air Force	8
Gerald Frank Anderson	South Africa	Royal Flying Corps, Royal Air Force	8
Flaminio Avet	Italy	Corpo Aeronautico Militare	8
Geoffrey Bailey	United Kingdom	Royal Flying Corps, Royal Air Force	8
Paul Barbreau	France	Aéronautique Militaire	8
Charles Bartlett	United Kingdom	Royal Naval Air Service, Royal Air Force	8
Bernard Beanlands	Canada	Royal Flying Corps, Royal Air Force	8
Donald Beard	United Kingdom	Royal Flying Corps. Royal Air Force	8
Ludwig Beckmann	German Empire	Luftstreitkräfte	8
Edwin Benbow	United Kingdom	Royal Flying Corps, Royal Air Force	8
Maurice Benjamin	South Africa	Royal Flying Corps, Royal Air Force	8
Henry Biziou	United Kingdom	Royal Flying Corps, Royal Air Force	8
Gregory Blaxland	Australia	Australian Flying Corps	8
Giles Blennerhasset	United Kingdom	Royal Flying Corps, Royal Air Force	8
Karl Bohny	German Empire	Luftstreitkräfte	8
Aloys Freiherr von Brandenstein	German Empire	Luftstreitkräfte	8
Clive Brewster-Joske	Australia	Royal Flying Corps, Royal Air Force	8
Edric Broadberry	United Kingdom	Royal Flying Corps, Royal Air Force	8
Alfred John Brown	United Kingdom	Royal Flying Corps, Royal Air Force	8
Howard Burdick	United States	United States Army Air Service	8
Ernesto Cabruna	Italy	Corpo Aeronautico Militare	8
Alvin Callender	United States	Royal Flying Corps, Royal Air Force	8
James Martin Child	United Kingdom	Royal Flying Corps, Royal Air Force	8
Henry Clay	United States	Royal Flying Corps, United States Army Air Service	8
Robert David Coath	United Kingdom	Royal Flying Corps, Royal Air Force	8
Edwin Cole	United Kingdom	Royal Flying Corps, Royal Air Force	8
Hamilton Coolidge	United States	United States Army Air Service	8
James Geoffrey Coombe	United Kingdom	Royal Flying Corps, Royal Air Force	8
Dieudonné Costes	France	Aéronautique Militaire	8
Leslie Court	United Kingdom	Royal Flying Corps, Royal Air Force	8
William Craig	Canada	Royal Naval Air Service, Royal Air Force	8
Otto Creutzmann	German Empire	Luftstreitkräfte	8
Henry Crowe	United Kingdom	Royal Flying Corps, Royal Air Force	8
James Dawe	United Kingdom	Royal Flying Corps, Royal Air Force	8
Gilbert de Guingand	France	Aéronautique Militaire	8
John D. De Pencier	Canada	Royal Flying Corps, Royal Air Force, Royal Canadian Air Force	8
Gunther Dobberke	German Empire	Luftstreitkräfte	8
Percy Douglas	United Kingdom	Royal Flying Corps, Royal Air Force	8
Peter Roy Maxwell Drummond	Australia	Royal Flying Corps, Royal Air Force	8
Gordon Duncan	United Kingdom	Royal Flying Corps, Royal Air Force	8
William Durrand	Canada	Royal Flying Corps, Royal Air Force	8
Harold E. Easton	United Kingdom	Royal Flying Corps, Royal Air Force	8
Friedrich Ehmann	German Empire	Luftstreitkräfte	8
Leonard Herbert Emsden	United Kingdom	Royal Flying Corps, Royal Air Force	8
William Portwood Erwin	United States	United States Army Air Service	8
Walter Ewers	German Empire	Luftstreitkräfte	8
Harold Ross Eycott-Martin	United Kingdom	Royal Flying Corps, Royal Air Force	8
Garfield Finlay	Australia	Australian Flying Corps	8
Desmond Fitzgibbon	United Kingdom	Royal Naval Air Service, Royal Air Force	8
Georges Flachaire	France	Aéronautique Militaire	8
Austin Lloyd Fleming	Canada	Royal Flying Corps, Royal Air Force	8
Jean Alfred Fraissinet	France	Aéronautique Militaire	8
Hans-Eberhardt Gandert	German Empire	Luftstreitkräfte	8
Jacques Gerard	France	Aéronautique Militaire	8
Cyril Gladman	United Kingdom	Royal Flying Corps, Royal Air Force	8
Clive Glynn	United Kingdom	Royal Flying Corps, Royal Air Force	8
Max Gossner	German Empire	Luftstreitkräfte	8
James Grant	United Kingdom	Royal Flying Corps, Royal Air Force	8
Gilbert W. M. Green	United Kingdom	Royal Flying Corps, Royal Air Force	8
Eustace Grenfell	United Kingdom	Royal Flying Corps, Royal Air Force	8
Victor Groom	United Kingdom	Royal Flying Corps, Royal Air Force	8
Louis Prosper Gros	France	Aéronautique Militaire	8
Julien Guertiau	France	Aéronautique Militaire	8
Wolfgang Güttler	German Empire	Luftstreitkräfte	8
Adolf Gutknecht	German Empire	Luftstreitkräfte	8
Hans von Häbler	German Empire	Luftstreitkräfte	8
Reuben Hammersley	United Kingdom	Royal Flying Corps, Royal Air Force	8
Frederick Harlock	United Kingdom	Royal Flying Corps, Royal Air Force	8
Herbert George Hegarty	United Kingdom	Royal Flying Corps, Royal Air Force	8
Alfred Hemming	South Africa	Royal Flying Corps, Royal Air Force	8
Heinrich Henkel	German Empire	Luftstreitkräfte	8
George Hicks	United Kingdom	Royal Air Force	8
D'Arcy Fowlis Hilton	Canada	Royal Flying Corps, Royal Air Force	8
Ivan F. Hind	South Africa	Royal Flying Corps, Royal Air Force	8
Wilhelm Hippert	German Empire	Luftstreitkräfte	8
William Norman Holmes	United Kingdom	Royal Flying Corps, Royal Air Force	8
Thomas Stanley Horry	United Kingdom	Royal Air Force	8
Richard Howard	Australia	Australian Flying Corps	8
Hans Hoyer	German Empire	Luftstreitkräfte	8
Paul Hüttenrauch	German Empire	Luftstreitkräfte	8
Hubert Hunt	United Kingdom	Royal Flying Corps, Royal Air Force	8
Frank Hunter	United States	United States Army Air Service	8
Michael Hutterer	German Empire	Luftstreitkräfte	8
Fritz Jacobsen	German Empire	Luftstreitkräfte	8
Clinton Jones Jr.	United States	United States Army Air Service	8
Ernest Graham Joy	Canada	Royal Flying Corps, Royal Air Force	8
Kenneth William Junor	Canada	Royal Flying Corps, Royal Air Force	8
Willi Kampe	German Empire	Luftstreitkräfte	8
Karl Kaszala	Austria-Hungary	Luftfahrtruppen	8
Fritz Kieckhäfer	German Empire	Luftstreitkräfte	8
Franz Kirchfeld	German Empire	Luftstreitkräfte	8
Robert Kirby Kirkman	United Kingdom	Royal Flying Corps, Royal Air Force	8
Arthur Gerald Knight	Canada	Royal Flying Corps	8
Sidney Knights	United Kingdom	Royal Flying Corps, Royal Air Force	8
Arthur Korff	German Empire	Luftstreitkräfte	8
Heinrich Kostrba	Austria-Hungary	Luftfahrtruppen	8
Fritz Krebs	German Empire	Luftstreitkräfte	8
Antoine Laplasse	France	Aéronautique Militaire	8
Kenneth Leask	United Kingdom	Royal Flying Corps, Royal Air Force	8
Forde Leathley	United Kingdom	Royal Flying Corps, Royal Air Force	8
Alvaro Leonardi	Italy	Corpo Aeronautico Militare	8
Cecil Arthur Lewis	United Kingdom	Royal Flying Corps, Royal Air Force	8
Alan Light	United Kingdom	Royal Flying Corps, Royal Air Force	8
George Lloyd	South Africa	Royal Flying Corps, Royal Air Force	8
Dudley Lloyd-Evans	United Kingdom	Royal Flying Corps, Royal Air Force	8
Ivan Loiko	Russia	Imperial Army Air Service	8
Carlo Lombardi	Italy	Corpo Aeronautico Militare	8
William Myron MacDonald	Canada	Royal Flying Corps, Royal Air Force	8
William John MacKenzie	United States	Royal Naval Air Service, Royal Air Force	8
Donat Makijonek	Russia	Imperial Army Air Service	8
Reginald Malcolm	Canada	Royal Flying Corps, Royal Air Force	8
George Ivan Douglas Marks	Canada	Royal Naval Air Service, Royal Air Force	8
Andre Martenot De Cordou	France	Aéronautique Militaire	8
Robert Massenet-Royer de Marancour	France	Aéronautique Militaire	8
Ernest Masters	United Kingdom	Royal Flying Corps, Royal Air Force	8
M. B. Mather	United Kingdom	Royal Flying Corps, Royal Air Force	8
Hugh Maund	United Kingdom	Royal Naval Air Service, Royal Air Force	8
John McCudden	United Kingdom	Royal Flying Corps	8
James McDonald	United Kingdom	Royal Flying Corps, Royal Air Force	8
Roderick McDonald	Canada	Royal Naval Air Service, Royal Air Force	8
Henry Meintjes	South Africa	Royal Flying Corps, Royal Air Force, South African Air Force	8
James Meissner	United States	United States Army Air Service	8
Alexander W. Merchant	United Kingdom	Royal Flying Corps, Royal Air Force	8
Karl Meyer	German Empire	Luftstreitkräfte	8
Leslie Mitchell	United Kingdom	Royal Flying Corps, Royal Air Force	8
Kurt Adolf Monnington	German Empire	Luftstreitkräfte	8
Henry Moody	United Kingdom	Royal Flying Corps, Royal Air Force	8
Joseph Michael John Moore	United Kingdom	Royal Flying Corps, Royal Air Force	8
Keith K. Muspratt	United Kingdom	Royal Flying Corps, Royal Air Force	8
Thomas Nash	United Kingdom	Royal Naval Air Service, Royal Air Force	8
Gastone Novelli	Italy	Corpo Aeronautico Militare	8
Luigi Olivari	Italy	Corpo Aeronautico Militare	8
Eric Olivier	United Kingdom	Royal Flying Corps, Royal Air Force	8
William O'Toole	United Kingdom	Royal Flying Corps, Royal Air Force	8
Otto Parschau	German Empire	Luftstreitkräfte	8
Edwin C. Parsons	United States	United States Army Air Service	8
Eric Pashley	United Kingdom	Royal Flying Corps	8
Arthur Peck	United Kingdom	Royal Flying Corps, Royal Air Force	8
Edmond Pillon	France	Aéronautique Militaire	8
Friedrich Poeschke	German Empire	Luftstreitkräfte	8
Roger Poupon	France	Aéronautique Militaire	8
Philip B. Prothero	United Kingdom	Royal Flying Corps	8
John Quested	United Kingdom	Royal Flying Corps, Royal Air Force	8
Lionel Rees	United Kingdom	Royal Flying Corps	8
Wolfram Freiherr von Richthofen	German Empire	Luftstreitkräfte	8
Claus Reimer	German Empire	Luftstreitkräfte	8
Karl Ritscherle	German Empire	Luftstreitkräfte	8
Charles Robson	United Kingdom	Royal Flying Corps, Royal Air Force	8
William Rooper	United Kingdom	Royal Flying Corps	8
Alexander Roulstone	United Kingdom	Royal Flying Corps, Royal Air Force	8
Richard Runge	German Empire	Luftstreitkräfte	8
William J. Rutherford	Canada	Royal Flying Corps, Royal Air Force	8
Harold Satchell	United Kingdom	Royal Flying Corps, Royal Air Force	8
Franklin Saunders	United Kingdom	Royal Flying Corps, Royal Air Force	8
Paul Sauvage	France	Aéronautique Militaire	8
Karl Scharon	German Empire	Luftstreitkräfte	8
Hans Schilling	German Empire	Luftstreitkräfte	8
Viktor Schobinger	German Empire	Luftstreitkräfte	8
Carl-August von Schoenebeck	German Empire	Luftstreitkräfte	8
Owen Scholte	United Kingdom	Royal Flying Corps, Royal Air Force	8
Wilhelm Schwartz	German Empire	Luftstreitkräfte	8
Walter Scott	United Kingdom	Royal Naval Air Service, Royal Air Force	8
Herbert Sellars	United Kingdom	Royal Flying Corps, Royal Air Force	8
John Edward Sharman	Canada	Royal Naval Air Service	8
Walter Simon	United States	Royal Flying Corps, Royal Air Force	8
George Simpson	United Kingdom	Royal Naval Air Service, Royal Air Force	8
Robert Sloley	South Africa	Royal Flying Corps	8
John Henry Smith	Canada	Royal Flying Corps, Royal Air Force	8
Langley Smith	Canada	Royal Naval Air Service	8
William Watson Smith	United Kingdom	Royal Flying Corps, Royal Air Force	8
Bertram Smyth	United Kingdom	Royal Flying Corps, Royal Air Force	8
Martinus Stenseth	United States	United States Army Air Service	8
Vladimir Strzhizhevsky	Russia	Imperial Russian Air Force	8
John Summers	United Kingdom	Royal Flying Corps, Royal Air Force	8
Leslie Sutherland	Australia	Australian Flying Corps, Royal Australian Air Force	8
Alexander Tahy	Austria-Hungary	Luftfahrtruppen	8
Fritz Thiede	German Empire	Luftstreitkräfte	8
Clifford Tolman	United Kingdom	Royal Flying Corps, Royal Air Force	8
Thomas Traill	United Kingdom	Royal Flying Corps, Royal Air Force	8
Del Vial	France	Aéronautique Militaire	8
Alexander Vlasto	United Kingdom	Royal Flying Corps, Royal Air Force	8
John Warner	United Kingdom	Royal Flying Corps, Royal Air Force	8
Leslie Warren	United Kingdom	Royal Naval Air Service, Royal Air Force	8
Wilbert White	United States	United States Army Air Service	8
Claude Melnot Wilson	Canada	Royal Flying Corps, Royal Air Force	8
William Wright	United Kingdom	Royal Flying Corps, Royal Air Force	8
Wilhelm Zorn	German Empire	Luftstreitkräfte	8
