= Rummell =

Rummell is a surname. Notable people with the surname include:

- Frances V. Rummell (1907–1969), American educator and columnist
- Leslie Jacob Rummell (1895–1919), American World War I flying ace
- Peter Rummell (born 1945), American real estate businessman
- Richard Rummell (1848–1924), American artist and illustrator
