= George Willard Furlow =

American World War I flying ace

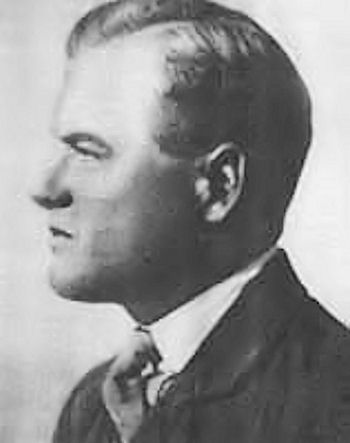
- George Willard Furlow, 1918
- Born: 24 March 1893; Rochester, Minnesota, USA
- Died: November 1959 (aged 66)
- Military career
- Allegiance: United States
- Branch: Air Service, United States Army
- Rank: Lieutenant
- Unit: Air Service, United States Army: 103d Aero Squadron
- Conflicts: World War I
- Awards: Distinguished Service Cross with Oak Leaf Cluster

Lieutenant George Willard Furlow (1893–1959) was a World War I flying ace credited with five aerial victories.

Furlow was posted to the 103rd Aero Squadron on 25 July 1918 as a Spad XIII pilot. On 11 August, he shared his first win over a German Albatros two-seater with Edgar Tobin. Over a month later, on 13 September, he shared a double triumph over Fokker D.VIIs with Charles R. d'Olive. He shot down another D.VII four days later, and finished out his victory string on 27 October 1918, when he teamed with Thomas Cassady and another pilot to destroy a Halberstadt reconnaissance machine.

== Citations of honors and awards ==
Distinguished Service Cross (DSC)

The Distinguished Service Cross is presented to George Willard Furlow, First Lieutenant (Air Service), U.S. Army, for extraordinary heroism in action near Charey, France, September 13, 1918. Lieutenant Furlow, while leading a patrol of three monoplace planes at an altitude of 400 meters, met and attacked an enemy patrol of seven monoplace planes. Despite numerical superiority, he destroyed two of the enemy's planes and with the aid of his companions forced the others to withdraw.

Distinguished Service Cross (DSC) Oak Leaf Cluster

The Distinguished Service Cross is presented to George Willard Furlow, First Lieutenant (Air Service), U.S. Army, for extraordinary heroism in action in the region of Vernéville, France, September 17, 1918. Lieutenant Furlow, while on a patrol with two companions, met and attacked an enemy formation of eight planes. In the course of the combat which ensued, Lieutenant Furlow's plane was severely damaged by the enemy's fire. Despite the damage, he continued the attack until he had destroyed one hostile aircraft, and with his patrol forced the remainder of the enemy to retire.

== Victory list ==
Date/time/unit/aircraft flown/aircraft downed/location

- - 11 Aug 1918, 1005 103rd SPAD XIII Albatros C.I Flirey
- - 13 Sep 1918, 1700 103rd SPAD XIII Fokker D.VII Charey
- - 13 Sep 1918, 1700 103rd SPAD XIII Fokker D.VII Charey
- - 17 Sep 1918, 1620 103rd SPAD XIII Fokker D.VII Vernéville
- - 27 Oct 1918, 1500 103rd SPAD XIII Halberstadt C Cumières-le-Mort-Homme

== See also ==
- List of American Aero Squadrons
- List of World War I flying aces
- List of World War I flying aces from the United States

== Bibliography ==
- American Aces of World War I. Norman Franks, Harry Dempsey. Osprey Publishing, 2001. ISBN 1-84176-375-6, ISBN 978-1-84176-375-0.
