= William Watson Smith =

Scottish First World War flying ace

- Born: 1892; Boharm, Banffshire, Scotland
- Died: Unknown
- Military career
- Allegiance: United Kingdom
- Branch: British Army; Royal Air Force
- Service years: 1915–1921
- Rank: Lieutenant
- Units: Gordon Highlanders; No. 139 Squadron RAF
- Conflicts: World War I • Western Front • Italian Front
- Awards: Distinguished Flying Cross

Lieutenant William Watson Smith DFC (born 1892, date of death is unknown) was a Scottish First World War flying ace credited with eight aerial victories.

== Military service ==
Smith was commissioned as a temporary second lieutenant in the Gordon Highlanders on 10 September 1915. He was serving in the 2nd Battalion, which formed part of the 20th Brigade, 7th Division, when it was sent to serve in Italy in November 1917.

On 3 July 1918 No. 139 Squadron RAF was formed at Villaverla as a fighter-reconnaissance squadron equipped with the Bristol F.2 two-seater fighter. The day after, 4 July, with the American Lieutenant Walter Carl Simon as his pilot, Smith drove down out of control an Albatros D.III over Levico. Two more victories soon followed, with Lieutenant H. C. Walters in the pilot's seat, when Smith destroyed another D.III over Cortesano on 15 July, and an Albatros D.V over Nemo on 17 July. Smith's grant of a temporary commission as a second lieutenant (observer officer) in the Royal Air Force became official two days later on 19 July. On 30 July, Smith was flying with Lieutenant Simon again, and was with his squadron on an offensive patrol when it encountered a squadron of 16 enemy aircraft. In the ensuing dogfight Simon and Smith were credited with five enemy aircraft destroyed within five minutes, though both men were wounded and their aircraft badly damaged.

Smith was awarded the Distinguished Flying Cross, which was gazetted on 7 February 1919. His citation read:

Second Lieutenant William Watson Smith.

"This officer has shown exceptional keenness and efficiency as an observer. He has taken part in numerous reconnaissances, and his reports are invariably clear and accurate, containing valuable information which has proved of great assistance in our recent operations."

== Post-war career ==
On 1 August 1919 Smith was re-seconded to the Royal Air Force for a period of two years as an observer officer with the rank of lieutenant, eventually relinquishing his temporary RAF commission to return to his regiment in the Army on 4 August 1921.
