= James Keating =

James Keating may refer to:

- Sir James Keating (cleric) (died c. 1491), Irish cleric and statesman
- James Keating (hurler) (born 1999), Irish hurler
- James Alfred Keating (1897–1976), American World War I flying ace
- James J. Keating (1895–1978), United States Marine Corps general
