= Norman Cooper =

Norman Cooper may refer to:

- Norman Cooper (sportsman) (1870–1920), English footballer and cricketer
- Norman Cooper (RAF officer) (1888–1960), American World War I flying ace
