= Wallace Lake =

Wallace Lake may refer to:

- Wallace Lake (Louisiana), a lake in Louisiana, United States
- Tom Wallace Lake, a lake in Kentucky, United States
- Lake Wallace, a lake in Victoria, Australia
