= Edgar Gardner Tobin =

American WW1 flying ace (1896-1954)

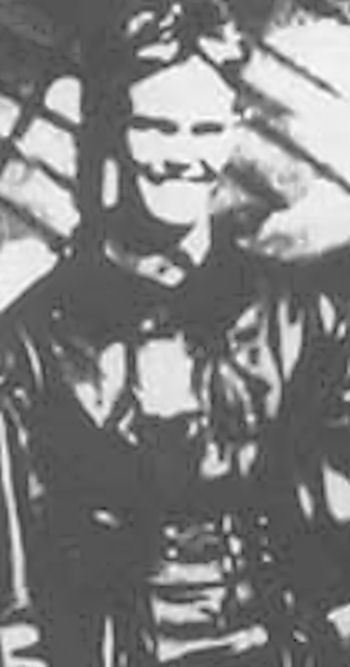
- Edgar Gardner Tobin, 1918
- Born: 7 September 1896; San Antonio, Texas, U.S.
- Died: January 10, 1954 (aged 57); Wallace Lake, Louisiana, U.S.
- Military career
- Allegiance: United States
- Branch: Air Service, United States Army
- Service years: 1917 - 1918
- Rank: Lieutenant
- Units: 94th Aero Squadron; 103rd Aero Squadron
- Conflicts: World War I
- Awards: Distinguished Service Cross, Croix de Guerre
- Other work: Became president of world's largest aerial mapping firm

Edgar Gardner Tobin (September 7, 1896 – January 10, 1954) was an American World War I flying ace, businessman, and pioneer in aerial photography. Tobin was born to a prominent San Antonio family and was educated at Texas Military Institute.

== World War I service ==
During World War I, Tobin served as a pilot in the United States Army Air Service. While he served in the 94th and 103rd Aero Squadrons, he scored all his victories while flying for the 103rd. From 11 July to 28 September 1918, he scored credited with six aerial victories. and an unverified one; one of his wins was shared with fellow ace George W. Furlow. Tobin ended the war with the Distinguished Service Cross and the Croix de Guerre for his actions in combat.

== Business career ==
After the war, Tobin returned to San Antonio and started a successful business selling Pierce-Arrow automobiles. In the late 1920s, he became interested in the emerging aviation technology and began selling Alexander Eaglerock aircraft.

In 1928, he took over an aerial mapping firm, which became instrumental in surveying the State of Texas and thus enabled the development Texas oil industry. During the Second World War, Tobin served as a civilian aide to General Henry "Hap" Arnold of the United States Army Air Corps. He died in the crash of a Grumman Mallard on January 10, 1954 on Wallace Lake, Louisiana along with one of the co-founders of Braniff International Airways, Thomas Elmer Braniff.

== See also ==
- List of World War I flying aces from the United States

== Bibliography ==
- American Aces of World War I. Norman Franks, Harry Dempsey. Osprey Publishing, 2001. ISBN 1-84176-375-6, ISBN 978-1-84176-375-0.
- Grieve, W. I. "Photogrammetric Pioneers: The Texas Story 1925 and Beyond." Photogrammetric Engineering and Remote Sensing 50, no. 9 (September 1984): 1297-1300. https://www.asprs.org/wp-content/uploads/pers/1984journal/sep/1984_sep_1297-1300.pdf. Accessed 15 May 2024.
