= Lawrence Kingsley Callahan =

Lawrence Callahan
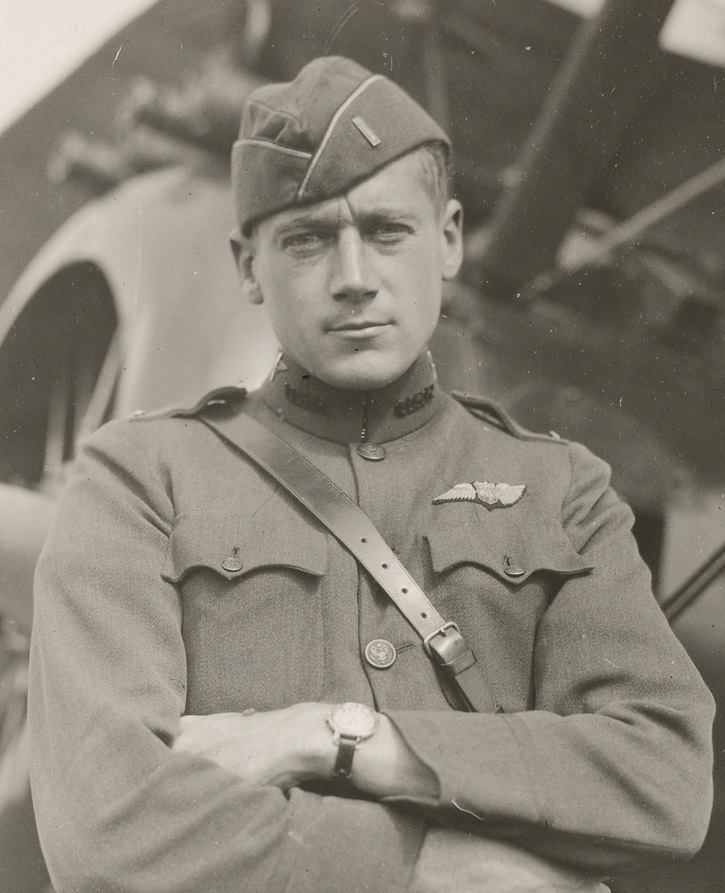
- Lawrence Callahan in France, August 1918
- Born: 11 January 1894; Louisville, Kentucky, USA
- Died: 17 September 1977 (aged 83); Gardena, California, USA
- Military career
- Allegiance: United States
- Branch: Royal Air Force (United Kingdom); Air Service, United States Army
- Rank: Lieutenant
- Nickname: Larry
- Units: Royal Air Force: No. 85 Squadron RAF; Air Service, United States Army: 148th Aero Squadron
- Conflicts: World War I World War II
- Awards: Distinguished Flying Cross

Lieutenant Lawrence Kingsley Callahan was a World War I flying ace credited with five victories.

== Early life ==
Callahan was born in Louisville, Kentucky and graduated from Cornell University.

== World War I aerial service ==
He was living in Chicago when he initially joined the Aviation Section, U.S. Signal Corps. He served on exchange duty with the Royal Flying Corps, receiving advanced training as a fighter pilot and attached to 85 Squadron when it went to war on the Western Front. He flew Royal Aircraft Factory SE.5a fighters to his first three triumphs, on 16 June, 13 July, and 24 July 1918. He then switched to No. 148 Squadron and its Sopwith Camels for his last two victories, when he destroyed Fokker D.VII fighters on 3 and 28 October 1918.

Elliott White Springs's Warbirds memoirs of No. 85 Squadron featured Callahan.

== Post World War I ==
Callahan returned to the military for World War II, joining the U.S. Army Air Corps. This term of service took him to duty with the 12th U.S. Air Force in Oran, Algeria.

== Honors and awards ==
He received a Distinguished Flying Cross (DFC), with a citation for gallantry and skill on the basis that he displayed gallantry, initiative and devotion to duty of the highest order.

== See also ==
- List of World War I flying aces from the United States

== Bibliography ==
- Above the Trenches: A Complete Record of the Fighter Aces and Units of the British Empire Air Forces 1915-1920 Christopher F. Shores, Norman L. R. Franks, Russell Guest. Grub Street, 1990. ISBN 0-948817-19-4, ISBN 978-0-948817-19-9.
- American Aces of World War I. Norman Franks, Harry Dempsey. Osprey Publishing, 2001. ISBN 1-84176-375-6, ISBN 978-1-84176-375-0.
