= Wendel Archibald Robertson =

American pilot

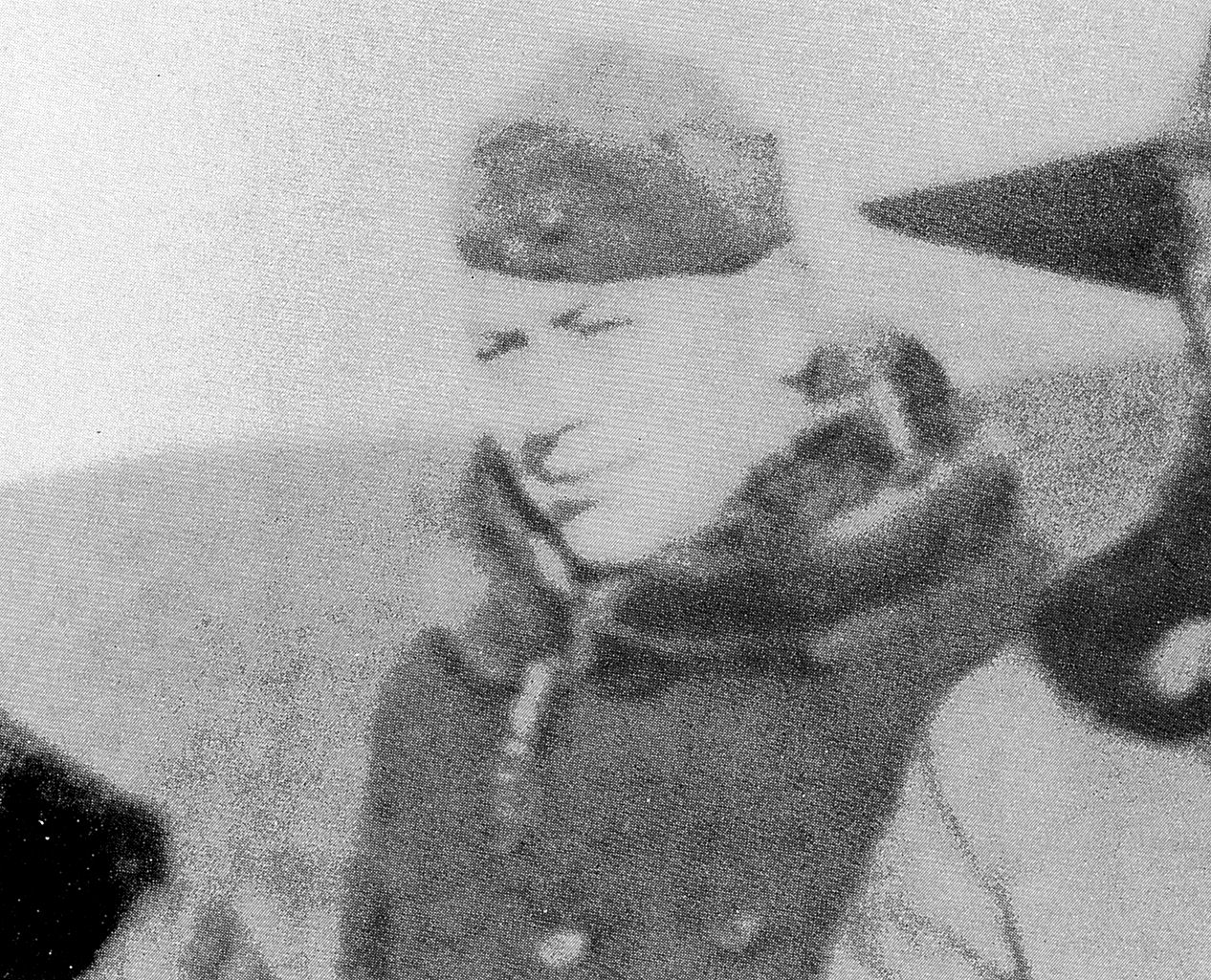
- Lieutenant Wendel Archibald Robertson, 139th Aero Squadron, Souilly Aerodrome, France, 1918
- Born: May 7, 1894
- Died: March 11, 1963 (aged 68)
- Burial place: Forest Park Cemetery, Fort Smith, Arkansas
- Military career
- Allegiance: United States
- Branch: Air Service, United States Army
- Unit: Air Service, United States Army: 139th Aero Squadron
- Conflicts: World War I

Wendel Archibald Robertson (7 May 1894 – 3 November 1963) was an American pursuit pilot and a flying ace in World War I.

== Biography ==
Born in Guthrie, Oklahoma, he joined the Air Service, United States Army in 1917 during World War I. After pilot training in the United States, Lieutenant Robertson was assigned to the 139th Aero Squadron, 2d Pursuit Group, First Army Air Service. In combat over the Western Front in France, Lieutenant Robertson was credited with shares in seven victories.

He attended Yale University and graduated on June 23, 1915 (Bachelors of Art)

He died on 3 November 1963 and was buried at Fort Smith, Arkansas.

== See also ==
- List of World War I flying aces from the United States
