= Thomas Gantz Cassady =

American fighter pilot

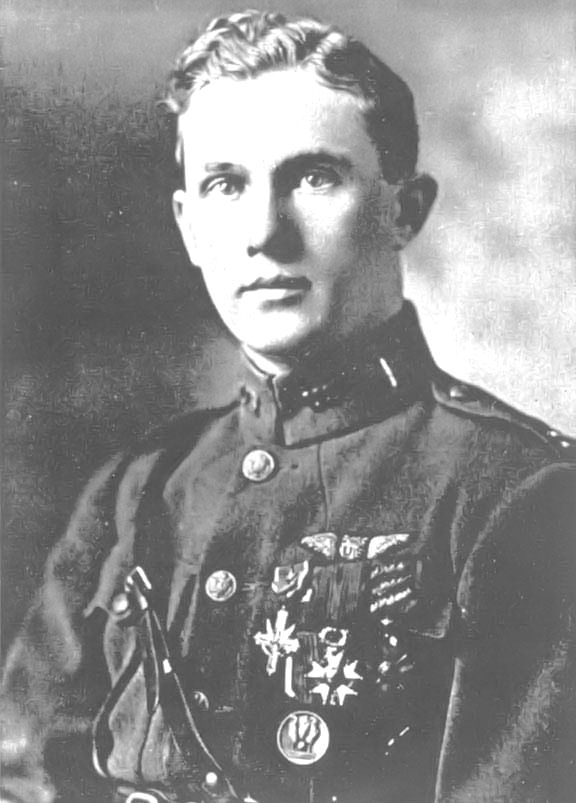
- Thomas Gantz Cassady, 1918
- Born: January 5, 1896; Freedom, Indiana, U.S.
- Died: July 9, 1972 (aged 76); Lake Forest, Illinois, U.S.
- Burial place: Lakewood Cemetery
- Military career
- Allegiance: France; United States
- Branch: Aéronautique Militaire (France); Air Service, United States Army
- Rank: Captain
- Units: Aéronautique Militaire: Escadrille SPA.157; Escadrille SPA.163; Air Service, United States Army: 28th Aero Squadron; 103d Aero Squadron
- Conflicts: World War I World War II
- Awards: Distinguished Service Cross with Oak Leaf Cluster, French Legion d'Honneur and Croix de Guerre.

Thomas Gantz Cassady (January 5, 1896 – July 9, 1972) was an American fighter pilot who served in both World Wars, and became a businessman during peacetime.

== World War I ==
Cassady graduated from the University of Chicago and went to France in the Ambulance Corps during Christmas break, 1916. Once there, on 3 February 1917, he enlisted in the French Foreign Legion and transferred to aviation. By July 1917, he was receiving flight training; on 6 October 1917, Sergent Cassady was brevetted a pilot. On 26 December 1917, he was assigned to Escadrille 157, which was a Spad unit. He passed on to the United States Army Air Service in February 1918 to serve in the 103rd Aero Squadron. From there, he was once again posted to another French Spad unit, Escadrille 163. While serving here, he scored a run of five confirmed and three unconfirmed aerial victories, between 28 May and 15 August 1918, sharing them with William Ponder and James Connelly, among others. He then transferred to the 28th Aero Squadron as a Flight Commander, and scored four more times between 14 September and 27 October 1918 using a Spad XIII, and sharing the honors with Martinus Stenseth and George W. Furlow among others.

== Between the World Wars ==
Cassady ran an investment business in Chicago.

== World War II ==
Cassady served with the Office of Strategic Services (OSS) during World War II, making four spying trips into Vichy France. He was subsequently captured by the Germans in 1942, and freed. He then worked with the OSS in Algiers on the invasion of southern France. The liberation of Paris brought Cassady the opportunity to be in charge of all intelligence activities there.

== Post World War II ==
Cassady died of cancer on July 9, 1972, in Forest Lake, Illinois. He was buried in Lakewood Cemetery in Minneapolis.

== Honors and awards ==
Distinguished Service Cross (DSC)

The Distinguished Service Cross is presented to Thomas G. Cassady, First Lieutenant (Air Service), U.S. Army, for extraordinary heroism in action near Fismes, May 29, 1918, and near Epieds, France, June 5, 1918. On May 29, 1918, Lieutenant Cassady, single-handed, attacked an Lvg. German plane which crashed near Fismes. On June 5, 1918, as patrol leader of five spades, while being attacked by 12 German Fokkers, he brought down one of the enemy planes near Epieds and by his dash and courage broke the enemy formation. (General Orders No. 138, W.D., 1918)

Distinguished Service Cross (DSC) Oak Leaf Cluster

The Distinguished Service Cross is presented to Thomas G. Cassady, First Lieutenant (Air Service), U.S. Army, for extraordinary heroism in action on August 15, 1918, near St. Maire. While in action as protection for a Salmson, First Lieutenant Cassady was attacked by seven Fokkers, two of which he brought down and enabled the Salmson to accomplish its mission and return safely. (General Orders No. 138, W.D., 1918)

Légion d'Honneur

He volunteered to serve France at a time when military service was not compulsory. Commended in a brilliant citation and seriously wounded while in the Medical Section, he later transferred to aviation, where he became indispensable due to his character, skill as a pilot, and fearless approach. He is officially credited with five enemy planes. (Légion d’Honneur citation)

== See also ==
- List of World War I flying aces from the United States

== Bibliography ==
- American Aces of World War 1 Harry Dempsey. Osprey Publishing, 2001. ISBN 1-84176-375-6, ISBN 978-1-84176-375-0.
