= Leonard Arthur Christian =

Canadian World War I flying ace

- Born: 9 May 1889; Near Armstrong, British Columbia, Canada
- Died: 24 January 1955 (aged 65); Vancouver, British Columbia, Canada
- Burial place: Mountain View Cemetery and Crematorium, Vancouver, British Columbia, Canada
- Military career
- Allegiance: Canada
- Branch: Royal Flying Corps
- Rank: Lieutenant
- Nickname: "Leo"
- Unit: No. 206 Squadron RAF
- Awards: Distinguished Flying Cross
- Other work: Served in the Royal Canadian Air Force during World War II

Lieutenant Leonard Arthur Christian was a Canadian World War I flying ace credited with nine aerial victories scored while he flew as an observer/gunner on Airco DH.9 bombers.

== Early life ==
Christian was born on a farm near Armstrong, British Columbia, Canada on 9 May 1889. HIs parents were Josephine E. and Joseph W. Christian. He was a bachelor horse breeder until he joined the military for World War I.

== World War I ==
Christian underwent pilot's training and graduated as a probationary Flying Officer in Bloody April 1917. However, because he was phobic about heights, he volunteered to serve as an aerial observer instead. He was posted to 6 Naval Squadron as an observer/gunner in Airco DH.9s and remained in the unit as it transformed into 206 Squadron of the Royal Air Force. Four months later, he began the victory tally that would run through 1 August 1918. He was awarded the Distinguished Flying Cross for his defensive valor during the 47 bombing raids that he flew.

His Distinguished Flying Cross was gazetted on 21 September 1918:

Lieutenant Leonard Arthur Christian (late R.N.A.S.)

Since joining his squadron this officer has taken part in forty-seven bomb raids, displaying at all times keenness and determination, and rendering his pilot most valuable support. He has accounted for four enemy aeroplanes, destroying two, and driving down two out of control.

== List of aerial victories ==
Although trained as a pilot, Christian scored all his victories as an observer/gunner on a bomber.

No.	Date/time	Aircraft	Foe	Result	Location	Notes
1	19 May 1918 @ 1940 hours	Airco DH.9 serial number C6240	Albatros D.V	Driven down out of control	Geluwe	Christian's pilot: Captain G L E Stevens
2	7 June 1918 @ 1200 hours	Airco DH.9 s/n C1181	Fokker Triplane	Set on fire; destroyed	Bac-St.-Maur	Christian's pilot: Captain G L E Stevens
3	12 June 1918 @ 1232 hours	Airco DH.9 s/n C6240	Pfalz D.III	Destroyed	Zonnebeke	Christian's pilot: Captain G L E Stevens
4	1 July 1918 @ 2015 hours	Airco DH.9 s/n B7596	Pfalz D.III	Set afire; destroyed	Houthem	Christian's pilot: Captain G L E Stevens. Shared victory.
5	29 July 1918 @ 1920 hours	Airco DH.9 s/n B7596	Fokker D.VII	Set afire; destroyed	North of Menen	Christian's pilot: Leslie Reginald Warren
6	29 July 1918 @ 1922 hours	Airco DH.9 s/n B7596	Fokker D.VII	Set afire; destroyed	North of Menen	Christian's pilot: Leslie Reginald Warren
7	29 July 1918 @ 1930 hours	Airco DH.9 s/n B7596	Fokker D.VII	Destroyed	West of Courtrai	Christian's pilot: Leslie Reginald Warren
8	1 August 1918 @ 0830 hours	Airco DH.9 s/n B7598	Fokker D.VII	Driven down out of control	Between Menen and Wervicq	Christian's pilot: Leslie Reginald Warren
9	1 August 1918 @ 0830 hours	Airco DH.9 s/n B7598	Fokker D.VII	Destroyed	Between Menin and Wervicq	Christian's pilot: Leslie Reginald Warren

See also Aerial victory standards of World War I

== Post World War I ==
On 23 August 1919, Christian was placed on the Royal Air Force's unemployed list. He returned to his horse farm to breed race horses. He returned to service in the Royal Canadian Air Force for World War II.

Leonard Arthur Christian died on 23 January 1955 and is interred in Mountain View Cemetery and Crematorium in Vancouver, British Columbia, Canada.
