= Chester Ellis Wright =

American World War I flying ace

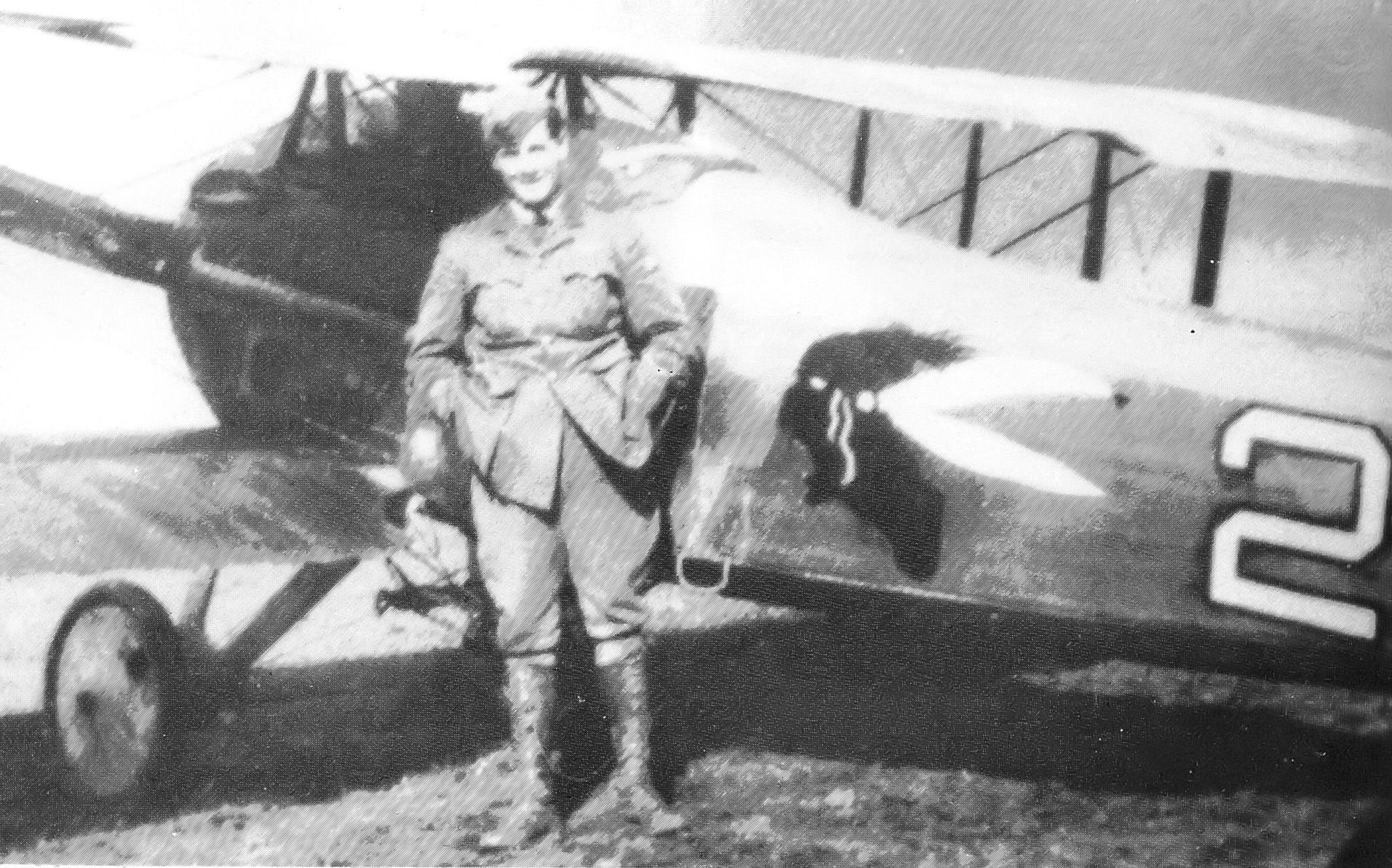
- Lieutenant Chester Ellis Wright, 93d Aero Squadron, Foucaucourt Aerodrome, France, 1918
- Born: 1 September 1897; Readville, Massachusetts, USA
- Died: 1933 (aged 35–36); Boston, Massachusetts, USA
- Military career
- Allegiance: United States
- Branch: Air Service, United States Army
- Service years: 1917–1919
- Rank: Lieutenant
- Units: 19th Aero Squadron USAAS, 93d Aero Squadron
- Conflicts: World War I
- Awards: Distinguished Service Cross

Lieutenant Chester Ellis Wright was an American World War I flying ace credited with nine confirmed aerial victories. He was the top scoring ace for his squadron.

== Early life ==
Chester Ellis Wright was born on 1 September 1897 in Readville, Massachusetts. His primary education was at Hyde Park School.

== World War I service ==
Wright finished three years at Harvard before joining the U.S. Army Air Service in March 1917. He continued his education, but at MIT. Later in 1917, he was appointed adjutant to the 19th Aero Squadron while it was still at Garden City, New York. He transferred overseas in November, sailing on the 23rd as a supply officer for the 15th Foreign Detachment. He completed his pilot's training and was assigned to ferry planes to France. On 29 July 1918, he was posted to the 93d Aero Squadron. The new squadron began combat operations the following month with Wright serving as a Flight Commander. Between 18 September and 23 October 1918, Wright shot down a German observation balloon, an unidentified enemy airplane, a Rumpler, and six Fokker D.VIIs, including one shared with Leslie Rummell. In the process, he won two Distinguished Service Crosses.

Wright returned home in March 1919. He was discharged the following month.

== Honors and awards ==
Distinguished Service Cross (DSC)

For extraordinary heroism in action near Beffu, France, 10 October 1918. Lt. Wright attacked an enemy observation balloon protected by four enemy planes; despite numerical superiority, he forced the planes to withdraw and destroyed the enemy balloon.

Distinguished Service Cross (DSC) Oak Leaf Cluster

For extraordinary heroism in action near Bantheville, France, 23 October 1918. Lt. Wright, accompanied by one other machine, took on and sent down in flames an enemy plane (Fokker type) that was attacking an Allied plane. He was in turn attacked by three enemy planes. His companion was forced to withdraw on account of motor trouble. Lt. Wright continued the combat and succeeded in bringing down one of the enemy planes and forced the remaining two into their own territory.

== See also ==
- List of World War I flying aces from the United States

== Bibliography ==
- Shores, Christopher F.; Franks, Norman & Guest, Russell F. (1990). Above the Trenches: a Complete Record of the Fighter Aces and Units of the British Empire Air Forces 1915–1920. London, UK: Grub Street. ISBN 978-0-948817-19-9.
- American Aces of World War I. Norman Franks, Harry Dempsey. Osprey Publishing, 2001. ISBN 1-84176-375-6, ISBN 978-1-84176-375-0.
