= Donald Hudson (aviator) =

American World War I flying ace

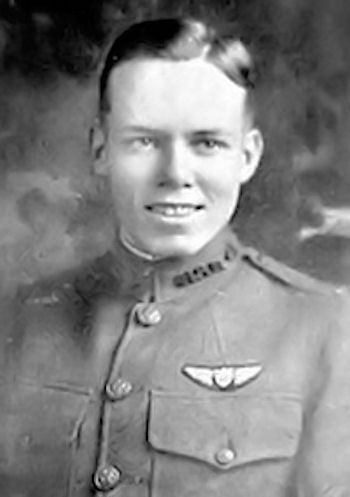
- Donald Hudson, 1918
- Born: 21 December 1895; Topeka, Kansas, U.S.
- Died: June 11, 1967 (aged 71); Fort Meade, Maryland, U.S.
- Relatives: Joseph K. Hudson (grandfather)
- Military career
- Allegiance: United States
- Branch: Air Service, United States Army
- Rank: Lieutenant
- Unit: 27th Aero Squadron
- Conflicts: World War I
- Awards: Distinguished Service Cross
- Other work: Record setting aviation pioneer in South America

Lieutenant Donald Hudson (21 December 1895 – 11 June 1967) was an American World War I flying ace credited with six aerial victories. Postwar, he pioneered aviation in Bolivia, including being the first aviator to fly across the Andes Mountains.

== Early life ==
Donald Hudson was born on 21 December 1895 in Topeka, Kansas, but considered himself a native of Kansas City, Missouri.

== World War I service ==
Hudson served with the 27th Aero Squadron for the last year of the war, as he reported there as a Nieuport 28 pilot in November 1917. He did not score a victory until 2 July 1918, when he teamed with John MacArthur and four other pilots to destroy a pair of Fokker D.VIIs. Hudson then changed to a Spad XIII as the squadron re-equipped. On 1 August, he became an ace, scoring three victories during a protection patrol with the help of Jerry Vasconcells and a couple of other pilots. The action won him a DSC. His final victory was chalked up on 6 October 1918.

== South American aviation pioneer ==
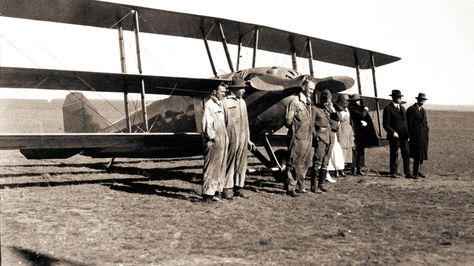
The Bolivian Curtiss 18T Wasp. The figure third from left appears to be Donald Hudson.

Postwar, Hudson became an instructor with the Bolivian Air Force. During his stay in South America, he was credited as being the first to overfly the Andes Mountains.

The President of Bolivia, José Gutiérrez Guerra, instructed Dr. Julio Zamora, Secretary of the Interior, to contract for a specially built Curtiss 18T Wasp triplane; they may have been introduced to Hudson during this transaction. At any rate, Hudson, his bride, and two mechanics accompanied the disassembled Wasp when it arrived in La Paz via railroad from Chile on 20 December 1919. Hudson was ranked as a lieutenant colonel and hired as chief pilot of the newly established Escuela de Aviación.

Hudson began a series of record-setting flights; for instance, his use of the Wasp made him the only triplane pilot in South American history. On 17 April 1920, he took off from El Alto near La Paz and flew across the Andes for the mountain chain's first aerial crossing. Another flight took him to Lake Titicaca and set a South American altitude record of 8,294 meters (27, 211 feet) above sea level. Another high level flight like that, on 19 May, resulted in Hudson landing the Wasp with a mechanic passenger rendered unconscious by cold and the altitude.

On a flight between Oruro and La Paz, Hudson crashed the Wasp near Sica Sica. The destruction of the plane seems to have ended his influence, as he was then investigated by Bolivian authorities.

== Later life ==
On 11 June 1967, at Fort Meade, Maryland, Donald Hudson succumbed to the aftereffects of a stroke. He was buried at Arlington National Cemetery, Arlington, Virginia.

== Legacy ==
A monument to Hudson's pioneering flight across the Andes was erected in La Paz, Bolivia.

== Military honors and awards ==
Distinguished Service Cross (DSC)

The Distinguished Service Cross is presented to Donald Hudson, First Lieutenant (Air Service), U.S. Army, for extraordinary heroism in action near Fere-en-Tardenois, France, August 1, 1918. A protection patrol of which Lieutenant Hudson was a member was attacked by a large formation of enemy planes. First Lieutenant Hudson was separated from the formation and forced to a low altitude by four enemy planes (Fokker type). He shot down one, drove off the other three, and started to our lines with a damaged machine, but was attacked by two planes. He shot down both of these planes and, by great perseverance and determination, succeeded in reaching our lines.

== See also ==
- List of World War I flying aces from the United States

== Bibliography ==
- American Aces of World War I. Norman Franks, Harry Dempsey. Osprey Publishing, 2001. ISBN 1-84176-375-6, ISBN 978-1-84176-375-0.
- Conquistadors of the Sky: A History of Aviation in Latin America. Dan Hagedorn. University Press of Florida, 2008. ISBN 0-8130-3249-0, ISBN 978-0-8130-3249-8.
- Over The Front: The Complete Record of the Fighter Aces and Units of the United States and French Air Services, 1914-1918 . Norman Franks, Frank Bailey. Grub Street Publishing, 2008. ISBN 0948817542 ISBN 978-0948817540
