= Edgar Taylor (aviator) =

WW1 American pilot (1897-1918)

- Born: September 27, 1897; Central Falls, Rhode Island
- Died: August 24, 1918 (aged 20); Near Cul de Sac Ferme, France
- Burial place: Arras Flying Services Memorial, Pas de Calais, France
- Military career
- Allegiance: United States
- Branch: Royal Air Force (United Kingdom)
- Unit: Royal Air Force: No. 79 Squadron RAF
- Conflicts: World War I

Edgar Taylor (9 January 1897 – 24 August 1918) was an American pursuit pilot and a flying ace in World War I.

He died near Cul de Sac Ferme France in combat on 24 August 1918

== Biography ==
Born in Central Falls, Rhode Island, Taylor went to Canada and joined the Royal Air Force in 1917. After pilot training near Toronto, he was deployed to France and was assigned to No. 79 Squadron, equipped with Dopwith F1 Dolphin fighters, joining the unit on 24 April 1918. After shooting down one enemy aircraft, he went on to destroy four enemy observation balloons in nine days, however was brought down by ground fire when attacking a balloon on 24 August.

== See also ==
- List of World War I flying aces from the United States
