= William C. Lambert =

American World War I flying ace

- William C. Lambert, 1918
- Born: August 18, 1894; Ironton, Ohio
- Died: March 19, 1982 (aged 87)
- Burial place: Woodland Cemetery, Ironton, Ohio
- Military career
- Allegiance: United States
- Branch: Royal Air Force (United Kingdom); United States Air Force
- Rank: Lieutenant Colonel
- Nickname: Bill
- Unit: Royal Air Force: No. 24 Squadron RAF
- Conflicts: World War I World War II
- Awards: Distinguished Flying Cross

William Carpenter "Bill" Lambert (1894–1982) was an American fighter pilot who flew in World War I. He was probably the second-ranking American ace of World War I. He claimed 18 air-to-air victories, eight fewer than "Ace of Aces" Eddie Rickenbacker and was awarded the Distinguished Flying Cross.

== Biography ==
Lambert was born on August 18, 1894, in Ironton, Ohio. He was the son of Mary and William G. Lambert. Lambert had his first airplane flight in a Wright biplane on 4 July 1910.

In 1914, Lambert quit his job as a chemist in Buffalo, New York, to go enlist in the Royal Regiment of Canadian Artillery. Finding no openings, he took a chemist's job with Canadian Explosives Limited until 1916. He joined the Royal Flying Corps in early 1917, and sailed for England after completion of his training, on 19 November 1917. He joined No. 24 Squadron RFC on 20 March 1918, flying the Royal Aircraft Factory SE.5a, where his teacher was top scoring Irish-born ace George McElroy. Between April and August, scored 18 victories–one observation balloon and 11 aircraft destroyed (with two victories shared), and six driven down out of control (one of which was a shared victory).

He was awarded the Distinguished Flying Cross.

Suffering from combat fatigue brought on by a bombing attack on his airfield, he was rotated back to England for medical leave on 20 August 1918 but the war ended before he recovered. One of his prized memorabilia was a piece of red canvas from von Richthofen's Fokker DR-1 triplane.

After the war, Lambert did some barnstorming in the Ironton, Ohio area and worked as an engineer. He also was the inventor of a rather unusual "pipe rest" which allowed a smoking pipe to be rested upon the smoker's chin.

Lambert joined the U.S. Air Service and served with the Army Air Forces in World War II. He retired in 1954 as a lieutenant colonel in the U.S. Air Force.

After World War, he was a frequent attendee at the RAF contingent's Battle of Britain celebration at Wright-Patterson Air Force Base in Dayton, Ohio.

Lambert's wartime experiences were related in his 1973 memoir Combat Report.

He died on March 19, 1982, aged 87. He and his wife are buried in the Woodland Cemetery, Ironton, Ohio, in a mausoleum that he designed.

== See also ==
- List of World War I flying aces from the United States

== Bibliography ==
- 'Over the Front'; Franks & Bailey, (Grub street) 1992.
- 'Above the Trenches'; Shores, Franks & Guest, (Grub street) 1990
- American Aces of World War 1 Harry Dempsey. Osprey Publishing, 2001. ISBN 1-84176-375-6, ISBN 978-1-84176-375-0.
