= Charles Rudolph d'Olive =

American World War I flying ace

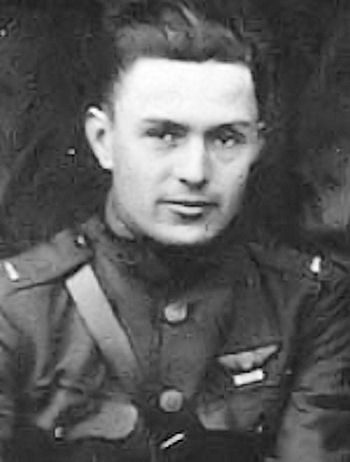
- Charles Rudolph d'Olive, 1918
- Born: 10 July 1896; Suggsville, Alabama, USA
- Died: 20 July 1974 (aged 78); Waterloo, Iowa, USA
- Burial place: Cincinnati, Ohio, USA
- Military career
- Allegiance: United States
- Branch: Air Service, United States Army
- Service years: 1917 - 1918
- Rank: First lieutenant
- Nickname: Charlie
- Units: Air Service, United States Army: 93d Aero Squadron; 141st Aero Squadron
- Conflicts: World War I
- Awards: Distinguished Service Cross

First Lieutenant Charles Rudolph d'Olive was a World War I flying ace, credited with five aerial victories. He was the last World War I aviator to be declared an ace, in 1963.

== World War I ==
Although born in Alabama, d'Olive later lived in Cedar Falls, Iowa. He enlisted into aviation service in Memphis during Bloody April 1917. He trained in France, and was posted to the 93rd Aero Squadron on 23 August 1918 as a SPAD S.XIII pilot. He scored the new unit's first victory on 12 September. The following day, he shot down three Fokker D.VIIs, two in conjunction with George Willard Furlow; it was an exploit that earned d'Olive the Distinguished Service Cross. He scored once more, on 18 October 1918. Ten days later, he was transferred to the 141st Aero Squadron as a Flight commander.

== Post World War I ==
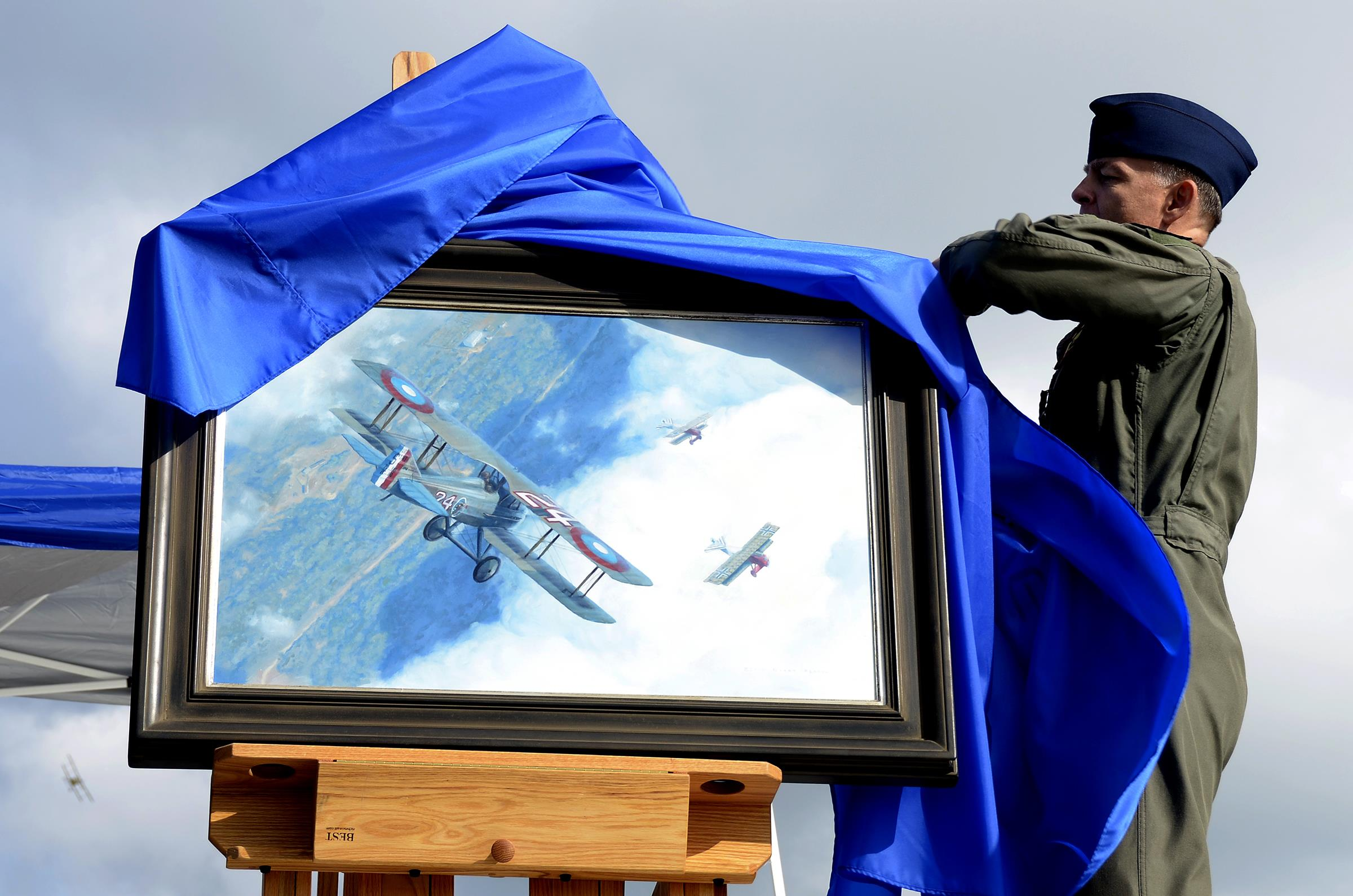
Unveiling of the painting of d'Olive's September 13, 1918 flight.

When d'Olive returned home, he went into business. For reasons that remain murky, d'Olive would not be officially recognized as an ace until 1963. He died of cancer on 20 July 1974.

In 2016, the USAF Air Force Reserve Command Historian Office commissioned a painting of d'Olive's three-victory flight, unveiling it at an event at the National Museum of the United States Air Force on October 1, 2016.

A number of historic items and documents from d'Olive's military service are on display at the 93d Bomb Squadron offices at Barksdale Air Force Base, Louisiana. In 2018, his daughter, Susan d'Olive Mozena, flew on a B-52 training mission with the 93rd in honor of his World War I achievements.

== Honors and awards citations ==
Distinguished Service Cross (DSC)

The Distinguished Service Cross is presented to Charles Rudolph d'Olive, First Lieutenant (Air Service), U.S. Army, for extraordinary heroism in action near St. Benoit, France, September 12, 1918, First Lieutenant D'Olive, in conjunction with another American pilot, engaged and fought five enemy planes. Outnumbered and fighting against tremendous odds, he shot down three enemy planes and outfought the entire enemy formation.

== See also ==
- List of World War I flying aces from the United States

== Bibliography ==
- American Aces of World War I. Norman Franks, Harry Dempsey. Osprey Publishing, 2001. ISBN 1-84176-375-6, ISBN 978-1-84176-375-0.
