= Charles Arthur Bissonette =

American World War I flying ace

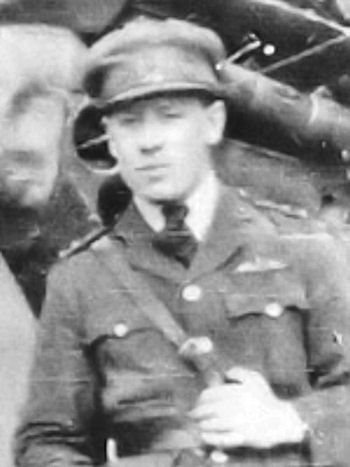
- Charles Arthur Bissonette, 1918
- Born: December 27, 1896; Toledo, Ohio
- Died: April 26, 1971 (aged 74); Los Angeles, California
- Military career
- Allegiance: United States
- Branch: Royal Air Force (United Kingdom)
- Units: Royal Air Force: No. 40 Squadron RAF; No. 64 Squadron RAF
- Conflicts: World War I

Charles Arthur Bissonette (27 December 1896 – 26 April 1971) was an American pursuit pilot and a flying ace in World War I.

He died in Los Angeles, California, on 26 April 1971.

== Early life ==
Charles was the son of Alfred M. and Joohana Bissonette.

== World War I ==
Charles began the war serving two years in the United States Naval Reserve. In October 1916, he went to Canada with the intention of enlisting in the Canadian Over-Seas Expeditionary Force and did so on October 17 of the same year.

In March 1917, Charles joined the Royal Flying Corps. He flew the S.E.5a fighter plane with 64 Squadron in 1918, while scoring six victories before being reassigned to 24 Squadron on 24 September 1918. He finished the war with 24 squadron, tallying no further victories for the allies.

== See also ==
- List of World War I flying aces from the United States
