= List of World War I flying aces from the United States =

Catalog of WW1 aces from the US

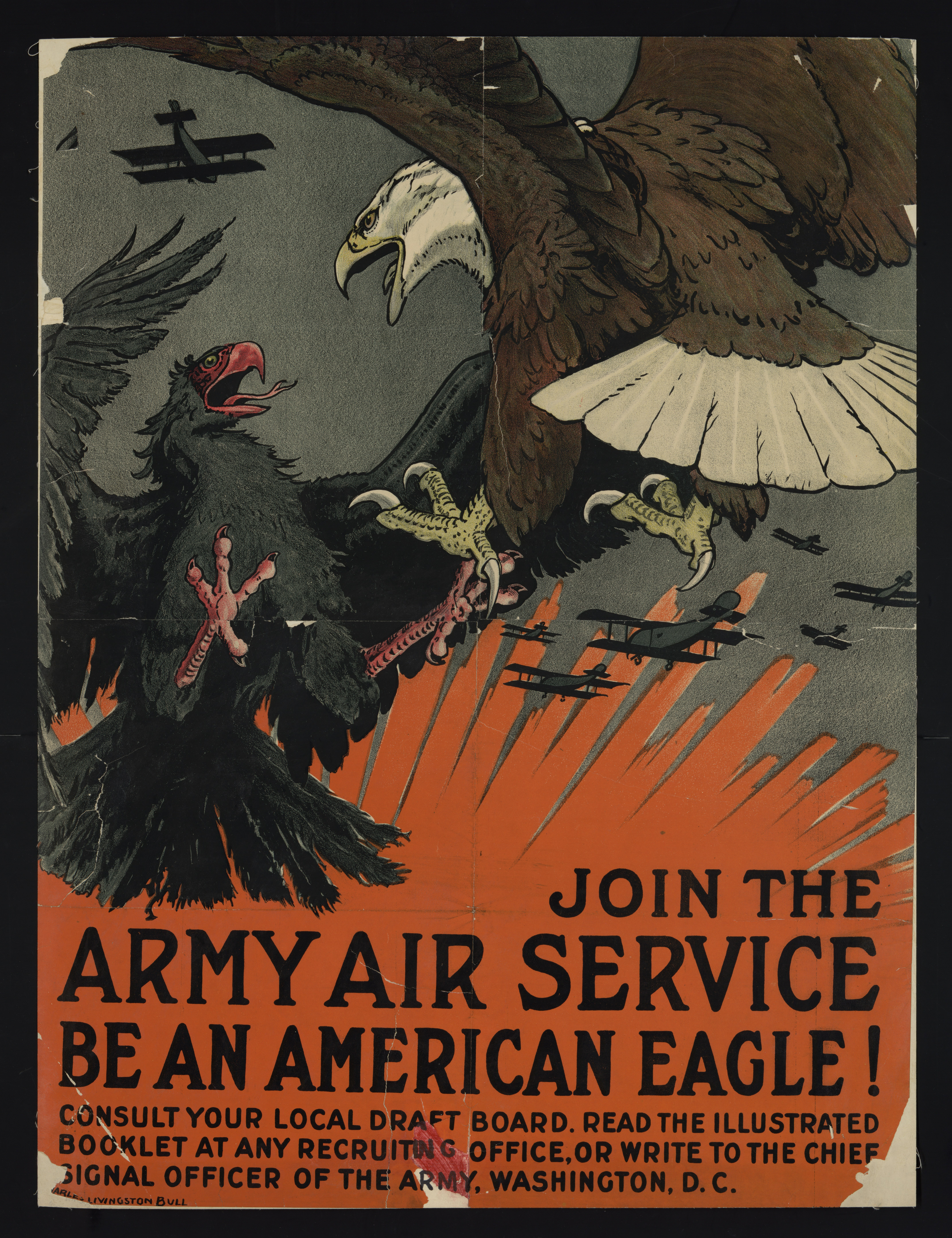
World War I Air Service recruiting poster

The following is a list of flying aces from the United States of America who served in World War I.

== Overview ==
Even before the United States entry into World War I in April 1917, many Americans volunteered to serve in the armed forces of Great Britain and France. Many eventually found their ways into the Royal Flying Corps and Aéronautique Militaire (French Air Service). The British integrated the Americans into their existing squadrons, while the French set up separate American squadrons such as the Lafayette Escadrille and then the Lafayette Flying Corps, as well as integrated the pilots into existing squadrons.

When American Air Service units began reaching England and France in the fall of 1917, many of the Americans serving in British and French squadrons transferred to the American units, but not all. This list is separated such that American pilots who served in the Royal Flying Corps (later Royal Air Force) squadrons and Aéronautique Militaire are listed as such, while those who served only in the Air Service, United States Army Aero Squadrons are listed separately. Known American air aces that chose to remain with their British or French squadrons are also listed.

The British and French documented aerial victories in different ways. The British decided early in the war that since the majority of air combat occurred behind enemy lines, confirmation of aerial victories would be made by witnesses mostly in the front line trenches. If an aircraft was seen going down "out of control", then the pilot would be given credit for a victory as it was presumed the plane crashed in enemy territory.

The French implemented a strict system of victories being confirmed by independent observers, and an enemy plane had to be seen to fall in flames and crash; or be destroyed in the air. Unconfirmed victories were also noted if the enemy plane was seen to spin out of control but the final end was not observed. These unconfirmed victories were noted, but not included in a pilots score.

The Americans generally used the French rules of scoring aerial victories with the exception of the 17th and 148th Aero Squadrons, which were under British control until October, 1918. The pilots flying in those squadrons were scored under British rules. "Shared" victories were noted when two or more pilots attacked an enemy plane, and it could not be determined precisely which pilot shot down the aircraft.

== Air aces ==
Pilots who scored five or more aerial victories were classified as "air aces". The lists below show the names; military rank; units in which they served, and miscellaneous notes along with the known decorations which they received.

=== Served with the Aéronautique Militaire ===
Name	Rank	Units	Notes
William Terry Badham	Lieutenant	Escadrille AR.214; Escadrille BR.40; Escadrille BR.210; 91st Aero Squadron	5 victories (all shared) Flew as observer/gunner Transferred to Air Service, United States Army, December, 1917; Awarded: Distinguished Service Cross (AS, USA); Silver Star Citation (×2)
Paul Frank Baer	Lieutenant	Escadrille N.124 (Lafayette Escadrille); Escadrille SPA.80; 103d Aero Squadron	9 victories (2 shared); Transferred to Air Service, United States Army, February, 1918; Awarded: Distinguished Service Cross (AS, USA) (×2); Légion d'honneur; Croix de guerre
Frank Leaman Baylies	Lieutenant	Escadrille SPA.73; Escadrille SPA.3	12 victories (3 shared); Killed in action: 17 June 1918; Awarded: Légion d'honneur; Médaille militaire; Croix de guerre (with seven palms)
James Dudley Beane	Lieutenant	Escadrille SPA.69; 22d Aero Squadron	6 victories (4 shared); Transferred to Air Service, United States Army, August, 1918; Awarded: Distinguished Service Cross (AS, USA); Croix de guerre
Charles John Biddle	Major	Escadrille N.124 (Lafayette Escadrille); Escadrille SPA.73; 13th Aero Squadron; 103d Aero Squadron	7 victories (4 shared); 1 unconfirmed. Transferred to Air Service, United States Army, February, 1918; Awarded: Distinguished Service Cross (AS, USA); Légion d'honneur; Croix de guerre; Order of Leopold II (Belgium)
Thomas Gantz Cassady	Captain	Escadrille SPA.157; Escadrille SPA.163; 28th Aero Squadron; 103d Aero Squadron	9 victories (5 shared); 3 unconfirmed. Transferred to Air Service, United States Army, July, 1918; Awarded: Distinguished Service Cross (AS, USA) (×2); Légion d'honneur; Croix de guerre
James Alexander Connelly Jr.	Adjutant	Escadrille SPA.157; Escadrille SPA.163	7 victories (5 shared); 2 unconfirmed. Awarded: Distinguished Service Cross (AS, USA); Médaille militaire; Croix de guerre (4 palms)
Charles Gossage Grey	Captain	Escadrille SPA.93; Lafayette Flying Corps; 213th Aero Squadron	5 victories (3 shared); Transferred to Air Service, United States Army, March, 1918; Awarded: Distinguished Service Cross (AS, USA)
Lansing Colton Holden Jr.	Lieutenant	Escadrille N.461; 95th Aero Squadron	7 victories (1 shared); Awarded: Distinguished Service Cross (AS, USA) (×2)
Gorman DeFreest Larner	Captain	Escadrille SPA.86; 103d Aero Squadron	7 victories (4 shared); Transferred to Air Service, United States Army, June, 1918; Awarded: Distinguished Service Cross (AS, USA) (×2); Croix de guerre
Gervais Raoul Lufbery	Major	Escadrille VB.106; Escadrille N.124 (Lafayette Escadrille); 94th Aero Squadron	16 victories (3 shared); 3 unconfirmed. Transferred to Air Service, United States Army, April, 1918; Killed in action: 17 June 1918; Awarded: Purple Heart (Retroactive, 2004); Légion d'honneur; Médaille militaire; Croix de guerre; Silver Medal for Bravery, Montenegro (Orden za hrabrost); Military Medal (United Kingdom))
Edwin Charles Parsons	Lieutenant	Escadrille N.124 (Lafayette Escadrille); Escadrille SPA.3	8 victories (2 shared); Awarded: Médaille militaire; Croix de guerre; Order of Leopold II (Belgium); Croix de guerre (Belgium)
David McKelvey Peterson	Major	Escadrille N.124 (Lafayette Escadrille); 103d Aero Squadron; 94th Aero Squadron; 95th Aero Squadron	6 victories (1 shared); Transferred to Air Service, United States Army, February, 1918; Awarded: Distinguished Service Cross (AS, USA) (×2); Croix de guerre
William Thomas Ponder	Lieutenant	Escadrille SPA.67; Escadrille SPA.163; 103d Aero Squadron	6 victories (4 shared); Transferred to Air Service, United States Army, February, 1918; Awarded: Distinguished Service Cross (AS, USA); Croix de guerre
David Endicott Putnam	Lieutenant	Escadrille SPA.38; Escadrille SPA.94; Escadrille SPA.156; 139th Aero Squadron	13 victories (2 shared); 16 unconfirmed. Transferred to Air Service, United States Army, May, 1918; Killed in action: 12 September 1918; Awarded: Distinguished Service Cross (AS, USA); Légion d'honneur; Médaille militaire; Croix de guerre
William Thaw II	Lieutenant Colonel	Escadrille D.6; Escadrille C.42; Escadrille N.65; Escadrille N.124 (Lafayette Escadrille); 103d Aero Squadron; 3d Pursuit Group (Commander)	5 victories (3 shared); 2 unconfirmed. Transferred to Air Service, United States Army, June, 1918; Awarded: Distinguished Service Cross (AS, USA) (×2); Légion d'honneur; Croix de guerre
Remington D. B. Vernam	Lieutenant	Escadrille SPA.96; 17th Aero Squadron	6 victories (2 shared); Awarded: Distinguished Service Cross (AS, USA)

=== Served with the Royal Flying Corps (later Royal Air Force) ===
Name	Rank	Units	Notes
Hilbert Leigh Bair	Lieutenant	No. 24 Squadron RAF; 25th Aero Squadron	6 victories (4 shared); Transferred to Air Service, United States Army, October, 1918; Awarded: Distinguished Service Cross (AS, USA); Distinguished Flying Cross (UK)
Louis Bennett Jr.	Lieutenant	No. 40 Squadron RAF	12 victories (1 shared); Killed in action: 24 August 1918
Charles Arthur Bissonette	Lieutenant	No. 24 Squadron RAF; No. 64 Squadron RAF	6 victories (1 shared)
Harold Koch Boysen	Lieutenant	No. 66 Squadron RAF	5 victories (3 shared); Awarded: Medal of Military Valor (Italy)
Sydney MacGillvary Brown×	Lieutenant	No. 29 Squadron RAF	5 victories Awarded: Distinguished Flying Cross (UK); Croix de guerre
Archibald Buchanan	Lieutenant	No. 210 Squadron RAF	7 victories Royal Naval Air Service (prior to 1 April 1918); Killed in action: 30 October 1918; Awarded: Distinguished Flying Cross (UK); Croix de guerre
Henry Robinson Clay	Lieutenant	No. 43 Squadron RAF; 41st Aero Squadron; 148th Aero Squadron	8 victories Transferred to Air Service, United States Army, September, 1918; Awarded: Distinguished Service Cross (AS, USA); Distinguished Flying Cross (UK); Silver Star Citation (×2)
Lawrence Kingsley Callahan	Lieutenant	No. 85 Squadron RAF; 148th Aero Squadron	5 victories Transferred to Air Service, United States Army, November, 1918; Awarded: Distinguished Flying Cross (UK); Silver Star Citation (×3)
Alvin Andrew Callender	Captain	No. 32 Squadron RAF	8 victories Killed in action: 30 October 1918
Charles Gray Catto	Lieutenant	No. 45 Squadron RAF	8 victories (2 shared)
Eugene Seeley Coler	Lieutenant	No. 11 Squadron RAF	16 victories (all shared with observer/gunner); Awarded: Distinguished Flying Cross (UK)
Ernest Sidney Tooker, alias: Norman Cooper	Lieutenant	No. 73 Squadron RAF	6 victories Awarded: Distinguished Flying Cross (UK)
Roy Edward Dodds	Captain	No. 103 Squadron RAF; No. 106 Squadron RAF	7 victories Awarded: Distinguished Flying Cross (UK)
John Owen Donaldson	Captain	No. 32 Squadron RAF	7 victories Awarded: Distinguished Service Cross (AS, USA); Distinguished Flying Cross (UK); Croix de guerre (Belgium)
Arthur Edmund Easterbrook	Lieutenant	No. 9 Squadron RAF; 1st Aero Squadron	5 victories (all shared), Flew as observer/gunner Transferred to Air Service, United States Army, October, 1917; Awarded: Distinguished Service Cross (AS, USA) (×2)
Francis Warrington Gillet	Captain	No. 70 Squadron RAF	20 victories Awarded: Distinguished Flying Cross (UK); Croix de guerre (Belgium)
John McGavock Grider	Lieutenant	No. 85 Squadron RAF	4 victories Killed in action June 18th, 1918
John Sharpe Griffith	Lieutenant	No. 60 Squadron RAF	7 victories Awarded: Distinguished Flying Cross (UK); Order of St. Vladimir (Russian Empire)
Frank Lucien Hale	Captain	No. 32 Squadron RAF; No. 85 Squadron RAF	7 victories Awarded: Distinguished Flying Cross (UK)
Lloyd Andrews Hamilton	Lieutenant	No. 3 Squadron RAF; 17th Aero Squadron	10 victories (6 shared); Transferred to Air Service, United States Army, June, 1918; Killed in action: 24 August 1918; Awarded: Distinguished Service Cross (AS, USA); Distinguished Flying Cross (UK)
Harold Evans Hartney	Lieutenant Colonel	No. 20 Squadron RAF; 27th Aero Squadron; 185th Aero Squadron; 1st Pursuit Group	7 victories (5 shared); 1 unconfirmed. Transferred to Air Service, United States Army, June, 1918; Awarded: Distinguished Service Cross (AS, USA); Légion d'honneur; Croix de guerre; Medal of Military Valor (Italy); Silver Star Citation
Richard Alexander Hewat	Lieutenant	No. 19 Squadron RAF; No. 87 Squadron RAF	6 victories Killed in action: 14 August 1918
Malcolm Clifford Howell	Lieutenant	No. 208 Squadron RAF	5 victories (1 shared)
Paul Thayer Iaccaci	Captain	No. 20 Squadron RAF	17 victories (all shared with observer/gunner); Awarded: Distinguished Flying Cross (UK)
David Sinton Ingalls	Lieutenant	No. 213 Squadron RAF; No. 217 Squadron RAF	6 victories (5 shared); Detached from: United States Navy, only US Navy air ace in World War I Awarded: Distinguished Service Cross (AS, USA); Distinguished Flying Cross (UK); Légion d'honneur
August Thayer Iaccaci	Captain	No. 20 Squadron RAF; No. 48 Squadron RAF	17 victories Awarded: Distinguished Flying Cross (UK)
James Alfred Keating	Lieutenant	No. 49 Squadron RAF	5 victories (all shared with observer/gunner); Awarded: Distinguished Service Cross (AS, USA); Distinguished Flying Cross (UK)
Field Eugene Kindley	Captain	No. 65 Squadron RAF; 148th Aero Squadron	12 victories (2 shared), 1 unconfirmed Transferred to Air Service, United States Army, August, 1918; Awarded: Distinguished Service Cross (AS, USA) (×2); Distinguished Flying Cross (UK)
Duerson Knight	Lieutenant	No. 1 Squadron RAF	10 victories (8 shared)
Harold Albert Kullberg	Captain	No. 1 Squadron RAF	19 victories (10 shared); Awarded: Distinguished Flying Cross (UK)
William Carpenter Lambert	Captain	No. 24 Squadron RAF	18 victories (5 shared); Awarded: Distinguished Flying Cross (UK)
Reed Gresham Landis	Colonel	No. 40 Squadron RAF; 25th Aero Squadron	12 victories Transferred to Air Service, United States Army, October, 1918; Awarded: Distinguished Service Cross (AS, USA); Distinguished Flying Cross (UK); Silver Star Citation
Jens Fredrick Larson	Captain	No. 8 Squadron RAF; No. 34 Squadron RAF; No. 84 Squadron RAF	9 victories (2 shared)
Oliver Colin LeBoutillier	Captain	No. 9N Squadron RNAF; No. 209 Squadron RAF	10 victories (4 shared); Also: Royal Naval Air Service (1916-1918)
Frederick Libby	Captain	No. 11 Squadron RAF; No. 23 Squadron RAF; No. 25 Squadron RAF; No. 43 Squadron RAF; 22d Aero Squadron	14 victories (all shared with observer/gunner); Transferred to Air Service, United States Army, August, 1918; Awarded: Military Cross
Frederic Ives Lord	Captain	No. 79 Squadron RAF	12 victories (1 shared); Awarded: Distinguished Flying Cross (UK); Order of Saint Stanislaus (Russian Empire)
Frederick Ernest Luff	Lieutenant	No. 74 Squadron RAF; 25th Aero Squadron	5 victories Transferred to Air Service, United States Army, October, 1918; Awarded: Distinguished Flying Cross (UK)
Emile John Lussier	Captain	No. 73 Squadron RAF	11 victories (2 shared); Awarded: Distinguished Flying Cross (UK)
William John MacKenzie	Captain	Dunkirk Seaplane Defence Flight; No. 9 Naval Squadron; No. 213 Squadron RAF	8 victories Royal Naval Air Service (prior to 1 April 1918); Awarded: Distinguished Flying Cross (UK); Croix de guerre (Belgium)
Francis Peabody Magoun	Lieutenant	No. 1 Squadron RAF	5 victories (3 shared); Awarded: Military Cross
James William Pearson	Captain	No. 23 Squadron RAF	12 victories (2 shared); Awarded: Distinguished Flying Cross (UK); Croix de guerre
Cleo Francis Pineau	Lieutenant	No. 6 Squadron RAF	6 victories Awarded: Distinguished Flying Cross (UK)
Orville Alfred Ralston	Lieutenant	No. 85 Squadron RAF; 148th Aero Squadron	5 victories (1 shared); Transferred to Air Service, United States Army, September 1918; Awarded: Distinguished Service Cross (AS, USA)
Bogart Rogers	Lieutenant	No. 32 Squadron RAF	6 victories
Oren John Rose	Captain	No. 92 Squadron RAF	16 victories Awarded: Distinguished Flying Cross (UK)
Evander Shapard	Lieutenant	No. 92 Squadron RAF	6 victories (1 shared); Awarded: Distinguished Flying Cross (UK)
Harold Goodman Shoemaker	Lieutenant	No. 74 Squadron RAF; 17th Aero Squadron	5 victories (3 shared); Transferred to Air Service, United States Army, June, 1918
Walter Carl Simon	Lieutenant	No. 34 Squadron RAF; No. 139 Squadron RAF	8 victories (all shared with observer/gunner); Awarded: Distinguished Flying Cross (UK)
Elliott White Springs	Captain	No. 85 Squadron RAF; 148th Aero Squadron	16 victories (3 shared); Transferred to Air Service, United States Army, September 1918; Awarded: Distinguished Service Cross (AS, USA); Distinguished Flying Cross (UK)
Edgar Taylor	Lieutenant	No. 79 Squadron RAF	5 victories Killed in action: 24 August 1918
William Dolley Tipton	Lieutenant	No. 3 Squadron RAF; 17th Aero Squadron	5 victories (3 shared); U.S. Air Force officially credits Tipton with 4 victories. Some have disputed the cited reference as possibly conflating the records of pilots William Dolley Tipton and William Duncan Tipton.: Distinguished Flying Cross (UK)
Kenneth Russell Unger	Lieutenant	No. 210 Squadron RAF	14 victories (4 shared); Awarded: Distinguished Flying Cross (UK)
George Augustus Vaughn Jr.	Lieutenant	No. 84 Squadron RAF; 17th Aero Squadron	13 victories (7 shared); Transferred to Air Service, United States Army, August 1918; Awarded: Distinguished Service Cross (AS, USA); Distinguished Flying Cross (UK); Silver Star Citation (×2)
Clive Wilson Warman	Captain	No. 23 Squadron RAF	12 victories Awarded: Distinguished Service Order; Military Cross

=== Served with the Air Service, United States Army ===
Name	Rank	Units	Notes
Clayton Lawrence Bissell	Captain	22d Aero Squadron; 148th Aero Squadron	6 victories Awarded: Distinguished Service Cross; Distinguished Flying Cross (UK)**; Silver Star Citation; * Squadron attached to RAF July–October 1918
Arthur Raymond Brooks	Captain	22d Aero Squadron; 139th Aero Squadron	6 victories (4 shared); Awarded: Distinguished Service Cross
Harold Robert Buckley	Captain	95th Aero Squadron	5 victories (4 shared); Awarded: Distinguished Service Cross (×2); Croix de guerre
Howard Burdick	Lieutenant	17th Aero Squadron	8 victories (3 shared); Awarded: Distinguished Service Cross; Distinguished Flying Cross (UK)**; Silver Star Citation; * Squadron attached to RAF June–October 1918
Douglas Campbell	Lieutenant	94th Aero Squadron	6 victories (1 shared); Awarded: Distinguished Service Cross (×5); Légion d'honneur; Croix de guerre; Silver Star Citation
Reed McKinley Chambers	Major	94th Aero Squadron	7 victories (2 shared); Awarded: Distinguished Service Cross (×4); Légion d'honneur; Croix de guerre
Everett Richard Cook	Captain	91st Aero Squadron	5 victories (all shared with observer/gunner); Awarded: Distinguished Service Cross; Légion d'honneur; Croix de guerre; Silver Star Citation
Harvey Weir Cook	Captain	94th Aero Squadron	7 victories (2 shared); Awarded: Distinguished Service Cross (×2)
Hamilton Coolidge	Captain	94th Aero Squadron	8 victories (3 shared); Killed in Action: 27 October 1918; Awarded: Distinguished Service Cross; Croix de guerre
Jesse Orin Creech	Lieutenant	148th Aero Squadron	7 victories (2 shared); Awarded: Distinguished Service Cross; Distinguished Flying Cross (UK)**; Silver Star Citation; * Squadron attached to RAF July–October 1918
Edward Peck Curtis	Lieutenant	95th Aero Squadron	6 victories (5 shared); Awarded: Distinguished Service Cross; Silver Star Citation
Charles Rudolph d'Olive	Captain	93d Aero Squadron; 141st Aero Squadron	5 victories (3 shared); Awarded: Distinguished Service Cross
William Portwood Erwin	Lieutenant	1st Aero Squadron	8 victories (all shared), Flew as observer/gunner Awarded: Distinguished Service Cross (×2); Croix de guerre
George Willard Furlow	Lieutenant	103d Aero Squadron	5 victories (4 shared); Awarded: Distinguished Service Cross (×2)
Harold Huston George	Lieutenant	139th Aero Squadron	5 victories (4 shared); Awarded: Distinguished Service Cross
Murray Kenneth Guthrie	Lieutenant	13th Aero Squadron	6 victories (4 shared); Awarded: Distinguished Service Cross (×3)
Edward Meeker Haight	Lieutenant	139th Aero Squadron	5 victories (4 shared); Awarded: Silver Star Citation
Leonard Coombes Hammond	Captain	91st Aero Squadron	6 victories (all shared); Flew as observer/gunner Awarded: Distinguished Service Cross; Silver Star Citation
Frank Kerr Hays	Lieutenant	13th Aero Squadron	6 victories (4 shared); Awarded: Distinguished Service Cross; Silver Star Citation
James Andrew Healy	Lieutenant	147th Aero Squadron	5 victories (3 shared); Awarded: Distinguished Service Cross; Croix de guerre
Donald Hudson	Lieutenant	27th Aero Squadron	6 victories (5 shared); Awarded: Distinguished Service Cross
Frank O'Driscoll Hunter	Captain	94th Aero Squadron; 103d Aero Squadron	9 victories (3 shared); Awarded: Distinguished Service Cross (×5); Légion d'honneur
Clinton Leonard Jones Jr.	Lieutenant	22d Aero Squadron	3 victories (3 shared); Awarded: Distinguished Service Cross (×2)
Howard Clayton Knotts	Lieutenant	17th Aero Squadron	6 victories (1 shared); Awarded: Distinguished Service Cross; Distinguished Flying Cross (UK)**; Silver Star Citation; * Squadron attached to RAF June–October 1918
James Knowles Jr.	Lieutenant	95th Aero Squadron	5 victories (1 shared); Awarded: Distinguished Service Cross; Croix de guerre; Silver Star Citation
Robert Opie Lindsay	Lieutenant	139th Aero Squadron	6 victories (5 shared); Awarded: Distinguished Service Cross
Frank Luke Jr.	Lieutenant	27th Aero Squadron	18 victories (4 shared); Killed in Action: 29 September 1918; Awarded: Medal of Honor; Distinguished Service Cross (×2); War Merit Cross (Italy)
John Knox MacArthur	Lieutenant	27th Aero Squadron	6 victories (3 shared); Killed in Action: 20 July 1918; Awarded: Distinguished Service Cross; Légion d'honneur; Croix de guerre
James Armand Meissner	Captain	94th Aero Squadron; 147th Aero Squadron	8 victories (4 shared); Awarded: Distinguished Service Cross (×2); Croix de guerre
Zenos Ramsey Miller	Lieutenant	27th Aero Squadron	5 victories** Awarded: Prisoner of War Medal (1985-Retroactive); Croix de guerre; Silver Star Citation; * Became Prisoner of War, 20 July 1918 after shooting down two enemy aircraft during combat. Air Ace status confirmed in November 1918 after release
Ralph Ambrose O'Neill	Lieutenant	147th Aero Squadron	5 victories (5 shared); Awarded: Distinguished Service Cross; Croix de guerre
John Sidney Owens	Lieutenant	139th Aero Squadron	5 victories (5 shared)
Kenneth Lee Porter	Lieutenant	147th Aero Squadron	5 victories (4 shared); Awarded: Distinguished Service Cross; Croix de guerre
Edward Vernon Rickenbacker	Captain	94th Aero Squadron	26 victories (4 shared); Awarded: Medal of Honor; Distinguished Service Cross (7x); Légion d'honneur; Croix de guerre
Wendel Archibald Robertson	Lieutenant	139th Aero Squadron	7 victories (6 shared)
Leslie Jacob Rummell	Lieutenant	93d Aero Squadron	7 victories (3 shared); Awarded: Distinguished Service Cross
Karl John Schoen	Lieutenant	139th Aero Squadron	7 victories (7 shared); Killed in action: 29 October 1918; Awarded: Distinguished Service Cross
John Joseph Seerley Jr.	Lieutenant	13th Aero Squadron	5 victories (5 shared)
Sumner Sewall	Captain	95th Aero Squadron	7 victories (4 shared); Awarded: Distinguished Service Cross (×2); Légion d'honneur; Order of Leopold II (Belgium); Croix de guerre
Francis May Simonds	Lieutenant	147th Aero Squadron	5 victories (5 shared); Awarded: Croix de guerre; Silver Star Citation
Martinus Stenseth	Lieutenant	28th Aero Squadron	8 victories (3 shared); Awarded: Distinguished Service Cross
William Howard Stovall	Lieutenant	13th Aero Squadron	6 victories (3 shared); Awarded: Distinguished Service Cross
Victor Herbert Strahm	Major	91st Aero Squadron	5 victories (5 shared with observer/gunner); Awarded: Distinguished Service Cross; Silver Star Citation
Jacques Michael Swaab	Lieutenant	22d Aero Squadron	10 victories (3 shared); Awarded: Distinguished Service Cross; Silver Star Citation (×2)
Edgar Gardner Tobin	Lieutenant	103d Aero Squadron	2 victories (2 shared), 1 unconfirmed Awarded: Distinguished Service Cross; Croix de guerre
Robert Miles Todd	Lieutenant	17th Aero Squadron	5 victories (2 shared)
Jerry Cox Vasconcells	Captain	27th Aero Squadron; 185th Aero Squadron	6 victories (1 shared); Awarded: Croix de guerre; Silver Star Citation
Joseph Frank Wehner	Lieutenant	27th Aero Squadron	6 victories (3 shared); Killed in Action: 18 September 1918; Awarded: Distinguished Service Cross (×2)
Wilbert Wallace White	Lieutenant	147th Aero Squadron	8 victories (2 shared); Killed in action: 10 October 1918; Awarded: Distinguished Service Cross (×2); Croix de guerre
Chester Ellis Wright	Lieutenant	93d Aero Squadron	9 victories (5 shared); Awarded: Distinguished Service Cross (×2)

== See also ==
- Aerial victory standards of World War I

== Bibliography ==
- Franks, Norman; Dempsey, Harry (2001). American Aces of World War I. Oxford, UK: Osprey Publishing. ISBN 978-1-84176-375-0.
- Franks, Norman & Bailey, Frank W. (1992). Over the Front: A Complete Record of the Fighter Aces and Units of the United States and French Air Services, 1914–1918. London, UK: Grub Street. ISBN 978-0-948817-54-0.
