= Leslie Warren =

British flying ace

Leslie Reginald Warren
- Born: 21 January 1899; Colony of Natal
- Died: Unknown
- Military career
- Allegiance: United Kingdom
- Branch: Royal Navy; Royal Air Force
- Service years: 1917–1919
- Rank: Captain
- Units: No. 6 (Naval) Squadron RNAS; No. 206 Squadron RAF
- Conflicts: First World War • Western Front
- Awards: Distinguished Flying Cross

Captain Leslie Reginald Warren DFC (born 21 January 1899, date of death unknown) was a British flying ace in the First World War who was credited with eight aerial victories.

== Biography ==
Warren was born in Colony of Natal, to English parents. Biographical sources indicate that his father was Reginald C. Warren, a solicitor from Weybridge, Surrey, while his mother, Kathleen M. Warren, was from Hurstpierpoint, Sussex. By 1901, the family were resident in Kensington, London. However, the source of this information appears to be from the 1901 census and close scrutiny of the document shows that he, and his real mother Margaret Amy Warren, were actually recorded as visitors in the household of Reginald and Kathleen Warren, who were his aunt and uncle. Warren's father was Bernard William Warren, who had been killed during the Battle of Colenso in 1899.

Warren joined the Royal Navy to serve in the Royal Naval Air Service and, on 26 September 1917, was promoted from temporary probationary flight officer to temporary flight sub-lieutenant.

He was posted to No. 6 (Naval) Squadron RNAS, which, on 1 April 1918 following the merging of the Army's Royal Flying Corps (RFC) and the RNAS, became No. 206 Squadron RAF.

Flying an Airco DH.9 two-seater bomber, Warren was credited with his first victory on 3 May 1918, shooting down an Albatros D.V fighter south of Merville, with Lieutenant O'Brien as his observer. On 7 June, he and his observer, Second Lieutenant Penny, shared in the driving down of an enemy aircraft over Bac Saint-Maur with Second Lieutenant C. M. Hyslop and Corporal J. W. Pacey.

Warren was then paired with Lieutenant Leonard Christian as his observer. On 1 July, they sent a Pfalz D.III fighter down in flames over Houthem. On 4 July, Warren was appointed a flight commander with the temporary rank of captain. Early on 29 July, Warren and Christian drove down another D.III over Roulers and sent two more down in flames that evening north of Menen. On 1 August, they accounted for two more between Menen and Wervicq, bringing Warren's total to eight, and Christian's to nine.

Warren was subsequently awarded the Distinguished Flying Cross, which was gazetted on 20 September 1918. His citation read:

Lieutenant (Temporary Captain) Leslie Reginald Warren (late R.N.A.S.).

"This officer has taken part in forty-six successful raids, fourteen of which he has led. In these operations his formation has only suffered one casualty. This remarkable immunity has been in the main due to his brilliant and skilful leadership; he combines keenness and determination with sound, clear judgment. In addition to raids, he has taken many area photographs, and carried out five long-distance reconnaissances, rendering valuable reports."

Warren was eventually transferred to the RAF's unemployed list on 11 March 1919.
