= Harold Goodman Shoemaker =

American flying ace in World War I

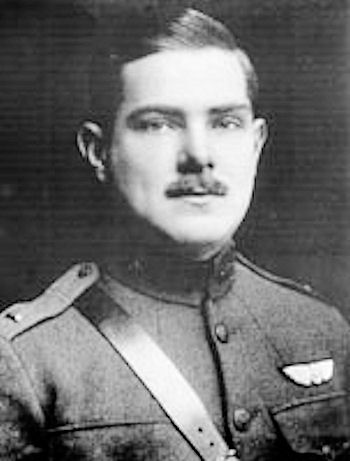
- Harold Goodman Shoemaker, 1918
- Born: September 1, 1892; Bridgeton, New Jersey, US
- Died: October 23, 1918 (aged 26); POW Camp in Germany
- Burial place: Bony, France
- Military career
- Allegiance: United States
- Branch: Royal Air Force (United Kingdom); Air Service, United States Army
- Nickname: Shorey
- Units: Royal Air Force: No. 74 Squadron RAF; Air Service, United States Army; 17th Aero Squadron
- Conflicts: World War I

Harold Goodman Shoemaker (1 September 1892 – 23 October 1918) was an American pursuit pilot and a flying ace in World War I.

== Biography ==
Shoemaker was a First Lieutenant in the Air Service, United States Army. He was attached to the Royal Air Force in the summer of 1918. He was one of the first American pilots to reach England. He was assigned to 74 Squadron and was credited with five air victories by the end of August. He returned to the AS, USA and was assigned to the 17th Aero Squadron, flying Sopwith Camels on 29 August.

On 5 October 1918, Shoemaker collided in mid-air with another pilot over enemy territory, being reported missing in action. The International Red Cross later reported that Shoemaker died in a prisoner of war camp in Germany. He was buried in the Somme American Cemetery and Memorial in the village of Bony, France.

The report of his death in a POW camp was in fact an error. Another pilot named Fred Shoemaker was shot down two weeks prior, wounded and died as a POW in a German Hospital. The chaos at wars end and confusion of Harolds transfer from the RFC to the 17th USAS just prior to his death probably created the situation where records were missing, and the Red Cross made an unfortunate error. Letters to the New Jersey veteran memorial committee showed that the parents believed the POW story as late as 1921. The American battlefield monuments commission still shows this misinformation on their web site, but all the records are clear on where he died, how and where he was initially buried on the field not far from the wreckage of his aircraft.

== See also ==
- List of solved missing person cases
- List of World War I flying aces from the United States
