= Sydney MacGillvary Brown =

American historian (1895–1952)

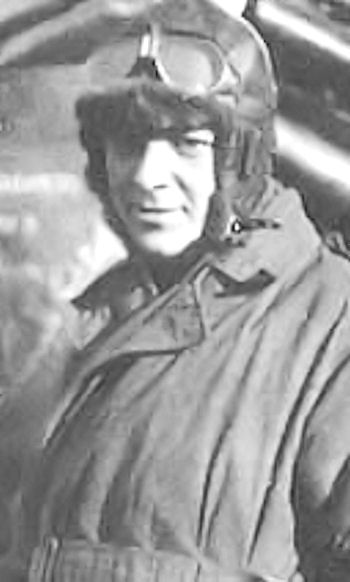
- Sydney M. Brown in 1918
- Born: 10 August 1895; Marblehead, Massachusetts, United States
- Died: 7 April 1952 (aged 56); Pittsburgh, Pennsylvania, USA
- Military career
- Allegiance: United Kingdom; United States
- Branch: Royal Air Force; United States Navy
- Service years: 1917–1918; 1942–1945
- Rank: Lieutenant (RAF); Lieutenant-Commander (USN)
- Unit: No. 29 Squadron RAF
- Conflicts: World War I World War II
- Awards: Distinguished Flying Cross; Croix de Guerre (France)
- Other work: Author and professor of medieval history

Sydney MacGillvary Brown DFC (10 August 1895 – 7 April 1952) was an American World War I flying ace, who later became an author and professor of medieval history.

== Biography ==
Brown was born in Marblehead, Massachusetts, and attended Bowdoin College in Brunswick, Maine, where he was member of Phi Beta Kappa society. He graduated in 1916, delivering an address at the commencement ceremony.

=== World War I ===
Brown joined the Royal Flying Corps in July 1917, and was appointed a temporary second lieutenant (on probation) on 12 January 1918. On 4 July 1918, he was assigned to No. 29 Squadron, flying the SE.5a. He destroyed a Fokker D.VII on 12 August 1918, a DFW reconnaissance plane on the 19th, another Fokker D.VII on 28 September, an observation balloon on 27 October 1918, and a third D.VII on the 28th. In February 1919 he was awarded the Distinguished Flying Cross. His citation read:

Second Lieutenant Sydney MacGillvary Brown.

On 28 October, when on offensive patrol, this officer, in company with three other machines, attacked nine Fokkers; three of the latter were destroyed, 2nd Lieut. Brown accounting for one. In addition, he has three hostile aircraft and one balloon to his credit. He is a fearless and intrepid officer.

=== Later career ===
Brown returned to his academic career after the war, attending Oxford University. In 1922 he was appointed assistant professor of History and Political Science at Lehigh University, Bethlehem, Pennsylvania, where he taught for the next twenty years. Brown was awarded a Master of Arts degree by Oxford in 1927, and received his PhD in 1937.

During World War II Brown served in the United States Navy Reserve as an aerial navigation officer in Britain and Italy, with the rank of lieutenant-commander.

In 1947 he was appointed an associate professor of medieval history at Duquesne University, Pittsburgh. He died on 7 April 1952 at the Mercy Hospital in Pittsburgh.

== Publications ==
- Brown, Sydney M. (1927). Mazzini and Dante. New York: The Academy of Political Science.
- Brown, Sydney M.; Coulton, G. G. (1928). "Five Centuries of Religion". American Historical Review. 33 (3). doi:10.2307/1839412. JSTOR 1839412.
- Brown, Sydney M.; Coulton, G. G.; Wilson, J. Dover; Hartridge, R. A. R. (1931). "A History of Vicarages in the Middle Ages". American Historical Review. 36 (4).
- Brown, Sydney M. (1932). Medieval Europe. New York: Harcourt, Brace.
- Odo Rigaldus, Archbishop of Rouen (1964). O'Sullivan, Jeremiah Francis (ed.). The register of Eudes of Rouen. Brown, Sydney M. (trans.). New York & London: Columbia University Press.

== See also ==
- List of World War I flying aces from the United States
