= John Knox MacArthur =

American World War I flying ace

John Knox MacArrthur
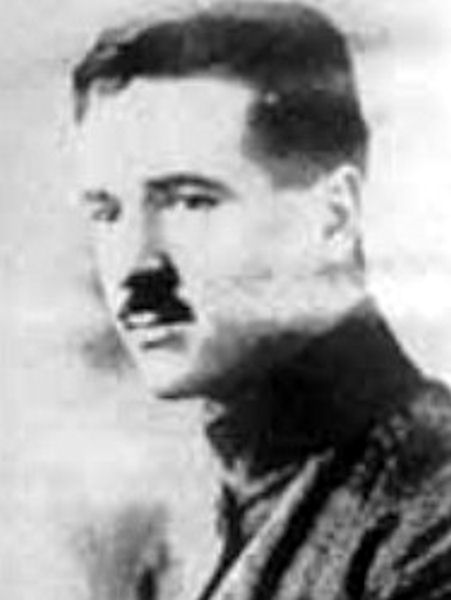
- Lieutenant John Knox MacArthur, 27th Aero Squadron
- Born: January 14, 1891; Columbia, Pennsylvania, US
- Died: August 9, 1918 (aged 27)
- Burial place: Wilmington and Brandywine Cemetery, Delaware US
- Military career
- Allegiance: United States
- Branch: Air Service, United States Army
- Rank: Lieutenant
- Nickname: Mac
- Unit: 27th Aero Squadron
- Conflicts: World War I
- Awards: Distinguished Service Cross

Lieutenant John Knox MacArthur (14 January 1891 – 9 August 1918) was an American World War I flying ace credited with six aerial victories. He was his squadron's first ace.

== Biography ==
MacArthur was an electrical engineer before he joined the U.S. Army Air Force.

MacArthur downed his half dozen German planes from 13 June through 19 July 1918, including a pair of Fokker D.VIIs shared with Donald Hudson, and three other pilots on 2 July.

On 20 July 1918, he was one of three pilots forced down by stormy weather. He was wounded and captured by the Germans. Taken to hospital, he died of his wounds.

Having scored all of his victories in the Nieuport 28, he was one of the most successful pilots in the type, along with Douglas Campbell.

== Honors and awards ==
Distinguished Service Cross (DSC)

The Distinguished Service Cross is presented to John Knox MacArthur, Second Lieutenant (Air Service), U.S. Army, for extraordinary heroism in action near Luneville, France, June 13, 1918. Outnumbered and handicapped by his presence far behind the German lines, Second Lieutenant MacArthur and three flying companions fought brilliantly a large group of enemy planes, bringing down or putting to flight all in the attacking party, while performing an important mission.

Légion d'honneur

== See also ==
- List of World War I flying aces from the United States

== Bibliography ==
- American Aces of World War I. Norman Franks, Harry Dempsey. Osprey Publishing, 2001. ISBN 1-84176-375-6, ISBN 978-1-84176-375-0.
- Over The Front: The Complete Record of the Fighter Aces and Units of the United States and French Air Services, 1914-1918 . Norman Franks, Frank Bailey. Grub Street Publishing, 2008. ISBN 0948817542 ISBN 978-0948817540
