= Malcolm Clifford Howell =

- Born: December 1, 1895; Bedford, New York
- Died: June 11, 1976 (aged 80); Westchester, New York
- Military career
- Allegiance: United Kingdom
- Branch: Royal Air Force: No. 208 Squadron RAF
- Conflicts: World War I

Malcolm Clifford Howell (1 December 1895 – 11 June 1976) was an American pursuit pilot and a flying ace in World War I.

He died in Westchester, New York on 11 June 1976

== Biography ==
Born in Bedord, New York, Howell left school and joined his father's real estate business in May, 1917. However, by July he had gone to Canada and volunteered for the Royal Flying Corps. Following his training near Toronto, he was sent to France in April 1918 and assigned to the Royal Naval Air Service, and became an ace with No. 208 Squadron in 1918. He was injured at the start of his career on 15 May. After recuperating from his injuries, he returned to his squadron. On 28 July, he shared the destruction of a Rumpler two-seater and gained his fifth victory on 5 October.

Howell returned to the United States after the war, and died in Westchester, New York in June, 1976.

== See also ==
- List of World War I flying aces from the United States
