= Frank Lucien Hale =

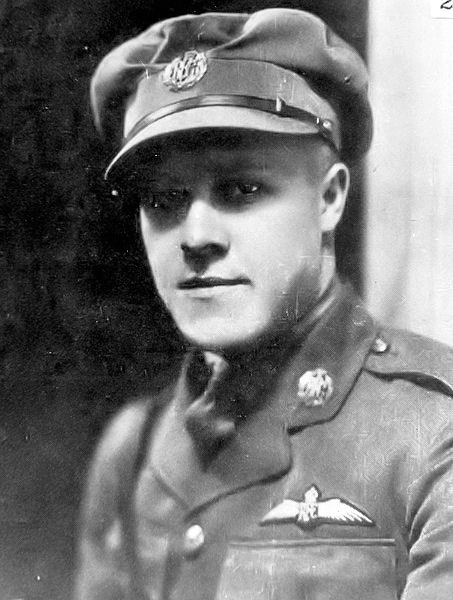
- Frank Lucien Hale, 1918
- Born: 6 August 1895; Syracuse, New York, USA
- Died: 7 June 1944 (aged 48); Buffalo, New York, USA
- Military career
- Allegiance: United States
- Branch: Royal Air Force (United Kingdom)
- Service years: 1914 - 1918
- Rank: Captain
- Nickname: Bud
- Units: Royal Air Force: No. 85 Squadron RAF; No. 32 Squadron RAF
- Conflicts: World War I World War II
- Awards: British Distinguished Flying Cross

Captain Frank Lucien Hale was a World War I flying ace credited with seven aerial victories. He later accompanied Charles Lindbergh in a transcontinental flight.

== Early life and World War I service ==
Hale was native to Syracuse, New York, although he later lived in Arkansas. He dropped out of Fayetteville High School in Fayetteville, New York because of disciplinary problems. In 1914, he joined D Troop, 4th Cavalry, New York National Guard. He served on the Mexican border during 1916, with the Ambulance Corps. He was rejected by the U. S. air service, so he joined the Royal Flying Corps at Toronto in June 1917. Between 25 August and 27 September 1918, he used a Royal Aircraft Factory SE.5a to destroy four Fokker D.VIIs and drive down three others out of control.

== Postwar ==
He remained in Germany as part of the Army of Occupation.

He then came home to become general manager of Curtiss Flying Service. He accompanied Charles Lindberg on a transcontinental flight.

In 1940, he opened an auto dealership in Syracuse. As World War II loomed, Hale joined the U.S. Army Air Corps. By 1943, he was in England serving with the 8th Air Force, but a heart condition invalided him out. He then went to work with the Bell Aircraft Corporation. He died of a heart attack on 7 June 1944.

== Honors and awards ==
Distinguished Flying Cross (DFC)

Lieut. Frank Lucien Hale. (FRANCE)

A brilliant and very gallant officer who never hesitates to attack the enemy however superior in numbers. On 27 September, Lieut. Hale, single-handed, attacked a formation of ten Fokker biplanes who were manoeuvring to attack one of our bombing formations; engaging one of the Fokkers, he drove it down out of control, and it was seen to break up in the air. By this gallant action the enemy were diverted from their objective. In the combat Lieut. Hale's machine and engine were badly damaged; despite this, he, on his return journey, attacked a solitary Fokker and drove it down out of control. This officer has accounted for eight enemy aircraft. (Supplement to the London Gazette, 8 February 1919) (31170/2040)

== See also ==
- List of World War I flying aces from the United States

== Bibliography ==
American Aces of World War 1 Harry Dempsey. Osprey Publishing, 2001. ISBN 1-84176-375-6, ISBN 978-1-84176-375-0.
