= Alvin Andrew Callender =

American pursuit pilot during World War I

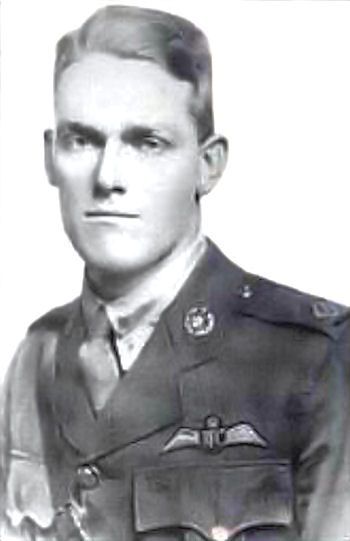
- Alvin Andrew Callender, 1918
- Born: July 4, 1893; New Orleans, Louisiana
- Died: October 30, 1918 (aged 25); Near Ghislain, France
- Burial place: Valenciennes (St. Roch) Communal Cemetery, Nord, France
- Military career
- Allegiance: United States
- Branch: Royal Air Force (United Kingdom)
- Unit: Royal Air Force: No. 32 Squadron RAF
- Conflicts: World War I

Alvin Andrew Callender (4 July 1893 – 30 October 1918) was an American pursuit pilot and a flying ace in World War I.

He died near Ghislain, France in combat on 30 October 1918.

== Biography ==
Born in New Orleans in 1893, he was a graduate of Tulane University with a degree in architecture. Callender served on the Mexican border with the National Guard in 1916.

Callender joined the Royal Flying Corps at Camp Baden, Canada in June 1917. He attended RFC training schools at Fort Worth, Texas and also in England, where he was at the Central Flying School. He was deployed to France and assigned to 32 Squadron, equipped with SE-5As. Shortly after his second victory he was shot down by an enemy fighter on 10 June, but survived unhurt. He was promoted to flight commander in early September 1918, however, on 30 October he was again shot down. He crashed within British lines and later died of his injuries. He was awarded eight aerial victories, his last being achieved on 24 September 1918.

== Eponyms ==
- New Orleans' first municipal airport was named Alvin Callender Field in 1926.
- A Civil Air Patrol composite squadron in New Orleans Lakefront Airport (KNEW) was named in his honor.
- Alvin Callender Street, New Orleans, LA is a small road in Uptown New Orleans by the Mississippi River.

== See also ==
- List of World War I flying aces from the United States
