= James Alfred Keating =

American flying ace

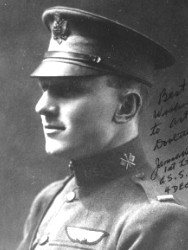
- James Alfred Keating, 1918
- Born: December 4, 1897; Chicago, Illinois, United States
- Died: October 2, 1976 (aged 78); Fort Lauderdale, Florida, United States
- Military career
- Allegiance: United States
- Branch: Royal Air Force (United Kingdom); Air Service, United States Army
- Service years: 1917–1918
- Rank: Lieutenant
- Unit: Royal Air Force: No. 49 Squadron RAF
- Conflicts: World War I
- Awards: Distinguished Service Cross (US), Distinguished Flying Cross (UK); Silver Star
- Other work: Served as a colonel during World War II

Lieutenant James Alfred Keating was an American World War I flying ace credited with six aerial victories, including four triumphs during a running battle on 9 August 1918.

== Biography ==
=== Early life ===
James Alfred Keating was born in Chicago, Illinois, on 4 December 1897. He lived in Fort Lauderdale, Florida. He married before joining the military.

=== Service in military aviation ===
Keating joined the Air Service, United States Army, receiving his commission on 26 December 1917. He was attached to the Royal Air Force in February 1918, being assigned to No. 49 Squadron RAF flying Airco DH.9 bombers in June. Along with his observer, 26-year-old Lieutenant Edward A. Simpson Keating was designated as an American air ace, as they scored six aerial victories. Their first victory came over Sergy on 22 July 1918, when they drove down a Fokker D.VII out of control. Their second was scored during a raid on Bethencourt when their formation was attacked by seven enemy Pfalz D.III fighter aircraft over the target. The next day they scored four victories after a bombing raid on the bridge at Falvy. During their return flight, they waged a 20 minute combat with Fokker D.VIIs, driving two down and setting two others aflame.

=== Later life ===
Keating returned to the American military during World War II, attaining the rank of colonel.

He died on 2 October 1976.

== Decorations and awards ==
American Distinguished Service Cross (DSC)
"The Distinguished Service Cross is presented to James Alfred Keating, First Lieutenant (Air Service), U.S. Army, for extraordinary heroism in action in the skies over France during the months of July and August, 1918. On August 9, 1918, Lieutenant Keating bombed Falvy Bridge over 1,000 feet, obtaining a direct hit. On returning, his formation was attacked by enemy planes and a running fight ensued. By skillfully flying with exceptional coolness he enabled his observer to shoot two planes down in flames. On August 8, 1918, after bombing Bethincourt Bridge over 800 feet, obtaining a direct hit, he found 7 enemy planes attacking his formation from the rear. By maneuvering for position he enabled his observer to shoot one down in flames over Bethincourt. On July 17, 1918, he bombed Passy Bridge over 500 feet, destroying it just as a column of transport was passing. He then opened machine-gun fire on the troops in the vicinity, causing many casualties and great disorder. His exceptional courage and splendid bravery were a constant inspiration to the members of his command." General Orders No. 9, W.D., 1923

British Distinguished Flying Cross (DFC)
"For gallantry and skill. On 9 August 1918, he bombed Falvy Bridge from 1,000 feet obtaining a direct hit. The formation was attacked on its way home by 25-30 EA and a running fight ensued to our lines. Lt. Keating showed exceptional coolness and judgement, and by skilful flying, enabled his observer to shoot down two EA in flames over Marchélepot and Ablaincourt. Two more EA were shot down by the formation and seen to crash in the vicinity of Soyecourt. His machine was so badly shot about that he was forced to land in the shell crater area. On 8 August [1918], after bombing Bethencourt Bridge from 800 feet, obtaining a direct hit, he found seven Pfalz scouts attacking his formation from the rear. He maneuvered for position, enabling his observer to shoot down one in flames over Bethencourt. On 17 July [1918], he bombed Passy Bridge from 500 feet, destroying it just as a column of transport was passing. He then opened machine gun fire on the troops in the vicinity, causing many casualties and great disorder. He has taken part in many successful bomb raids and his excellent example of coolness and courage in action is of the greatest service to his squadron." Supplement to the London Gazette

Silver Star

== See also ==
- List of World War I flying aces from the United States

== Bibliography ==
- Above the Trenches: a Complete Record of the Fighter Aces and Units of the British Empire Air Forces 1915-1920. Christopher F. Shores, Norman L. R. Franks, Russell Guest. Grub Street, 1990. ISBN 0-948817-19-4, ISBN 978-0-948817-19-9.
- Over The Front: The Complete Record of the Fighter Aces and Units of the United States and French Air Services, 1914-1918 . Norman Franks, Frank Bailey. Grub Street Publishing, 2008. ISBN 0948817542 ISBN 978-0948817540
