= Henry Robinson Clay =

American World War I flying ace

Henry Robinson Clay, Jr.
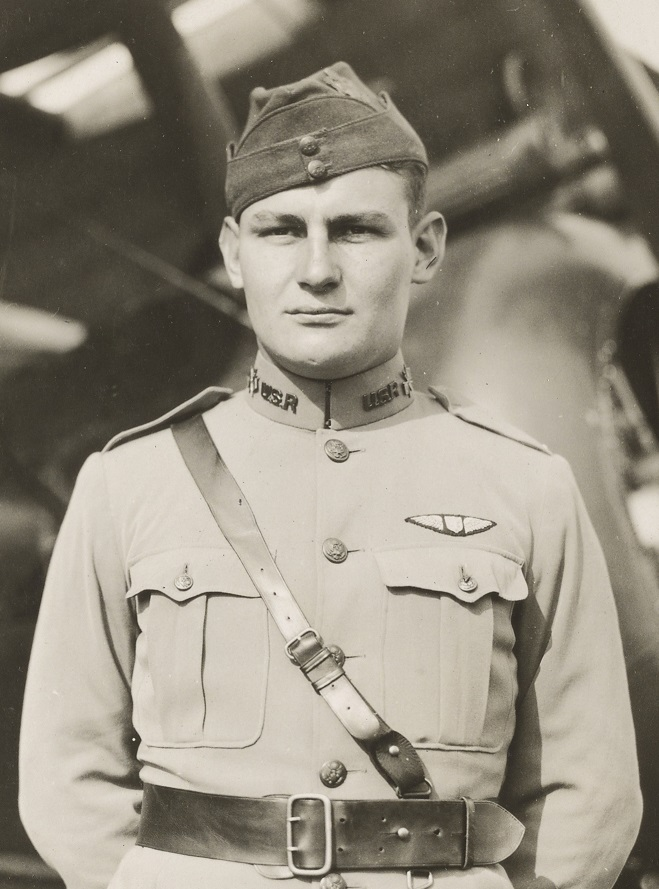
- Lt. Henry Clay in September 1918
- Born: 27 November 1895; Plattsburg, Missouri, USA
- Died: 17 February 1919 (aged 23); Coblenz, Germany
- Burial place: Greenlawn Cemetery, Plattsburg Missouri
- Military career
- Allegiance: United States
- Branch: Royal Air Force (United Kingdom); Air Service, United States Army
- Rank: Captain
- Nickname: Hank
- Units: Royal Air Force: No. 43 Squadron RAF; Air Service, United States Army: 41st Aero Squadron; 148th Aero Squadron
- Commands: 41st Aero Squadron USAS
- Conflicts: World War I
- Awards: Distinguished Service Cross, British Distinguished Flying Cross

Captain Henry Robinson Clay, Jr. was a World War I flying ace credited with eight confirmed aerial victories.

== Early life ==
Though born in Plattsburg, Missouri, on 27 November 1895, Clay later lived in Fort Worth, Texas.

== Aviation service ==
He was one of the first contingent of American fliers shipped to England to gain seasoning with the Royal Flying Corps. While assigned to 43 Squadron, he claimed a win, but it went unverified. He then transferred to the 148th Aero Squadron. He scored eight times between 16 August and 27 September 1918; on the latter date, he shared in the destruction of a Halberstadt reconnaissance plane with Elliott White Springs. In total, Clay destroyed five Fokker D.VIIs, and drove another down out of control; he shared in the destruction of two German reconnaissance planes. Clay was promoted to command of 41st Aero Squadron, but the war ended before it could see action.

He died in Coblenz, Germany during the great influenza epidemic, on 17 February 1919.

== Honors and awards ==
Text of citation for the Distinguished Flying Cross (DFC)

On 16 August, while leading his patrol, they were attacked by six Fokker biplanes over Noyon. Lt. Clay shot down one in flames and with his flight drove the others east. On 27 August, with another of his flight, he attacked a two-seater over Rémy. After a short burst the wing came off and the EA was seen to crash by three other pilots. On 4 September, while two flights of his squadron, led by Lt. Clay, were patrolling with two flights of No. 60 Squadron, RAF, they were engaged by ten Fokker biplanes. In the fight which ensued, he shot an EA off the tail of an SE5. It was seen to crash and burn up on the ground by a pilot of No. 60 Squadron. A moment later Lt. Clay attacked two EA on the tail of one of his patrol, one of which was seen to crash. This fight started at 4,000 feet and ended at 800 feet. Lt. Clay's flight accounted for three EA crashed and one out of control. This officer has been on active service since 17 March 1918. He has destroyed five EA (one two-seater shared with Lt. T.L. Moore) and driven down out of control one. He has exhibited on all occasions, admirable qualities of leadership and has moulded his flight into a most effective fighting unit.

Citation for posthumous award of the Distinguished Service Cross

The Distinguished Service Cross is presented to Henry Robinson Clay, Jr., First Lieutenant (Air Service), U.S. Army, for extraordinary heroism in action near Sains-les-Marquion, France, September 4, 1918. In an action wherein Lieutenant Clay's patrol was outnumbered two-to-one, he attacked the group and shot down the enemy aircraft in flames. He continued in the combat and later attacked two enemy aircraft which were pursuing a plane of his patrol and succeeded in shooting one enemy aircraft down. Again, on September 27, 1918, near Cambrai, France, with one other pilot, Lieutenant Clay observed five enemy planes approaching our lines and, although hopelessly outnumbered, immediately attacked and singled out a plane which was seen to crash to the ground. He was immediately attacked by the other enemy planes and compelled to fight his way back to our lines. (General Orders No. 60, W.D., 1920)

== See also ==
- List of World War I flying aces from the United States

== Bibliography ==
- Over the Front: A Complete Record of the Fighter Aces and Units of the United States and French Air Services, 1914-1918 (1992). Norman L. R. Franks, Frank W. Bailey. Grub Street. ISBN 0-948817-54-2, ISBN 978-0-948817-54-0.
- American Aces of World War I (2001) Norman Franks, Harry Dempsey. Osprey Publishing. ISBN 978-1-84176-375-0.
