= Martinus Stenseth =

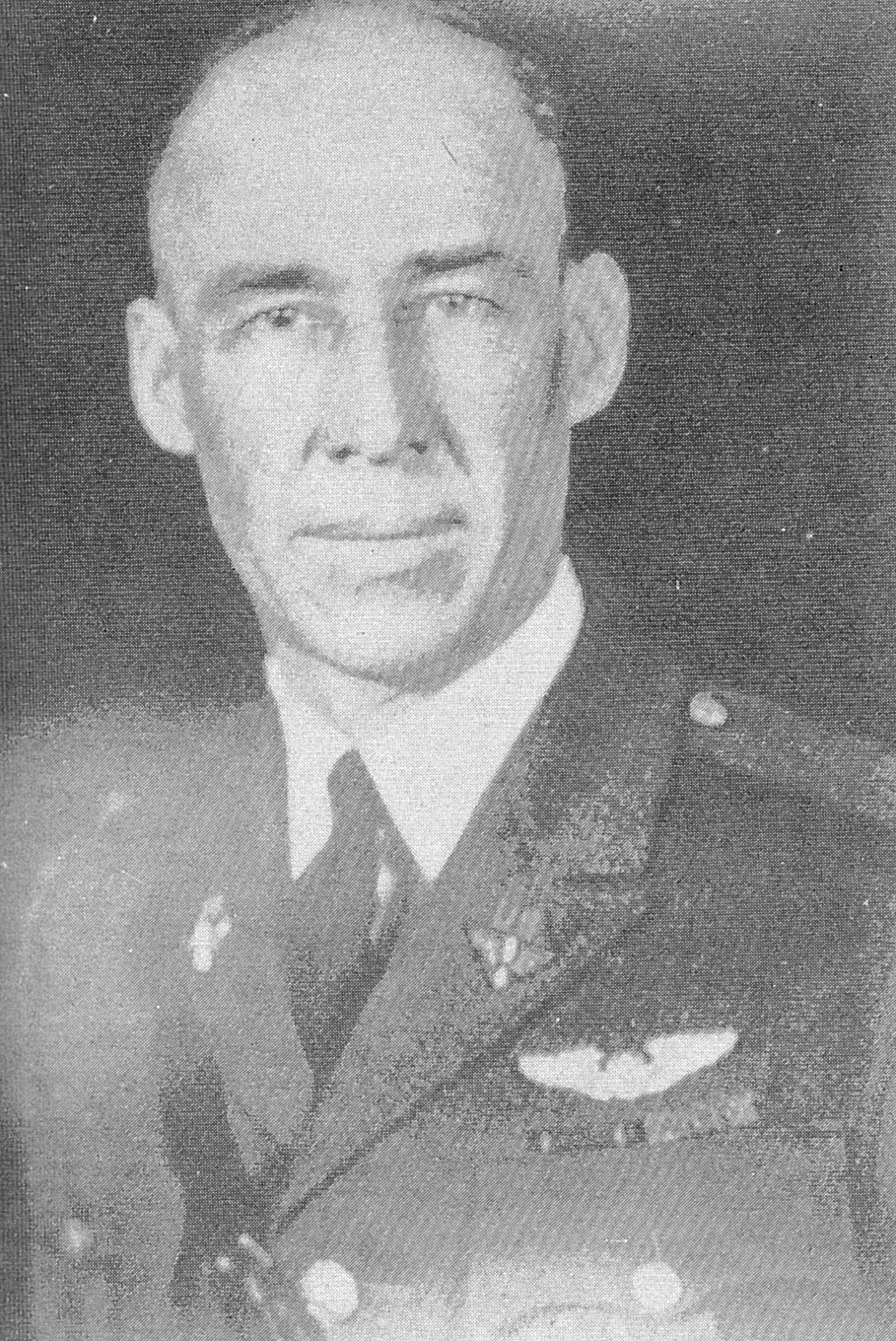
- Lieutenant Martinus Stenseth, 28th Aero Squadron, Foucaucourt Aerodrome, France, 1918
- Born: 11 June 1890; Heiberg, Minnesota, U.S.
- Died: 25 June 1979 (aged 89); Las Vegas, Nevada, U.S.
- Military career
- Allegiance: United States
- Branch: Air Service, United States Army
- Service years: 1916 - 1947
- Rank: Brigadier general
- Unit: 28th Aero Squadron USAAS
- Commands: 28th Aero Squadron, Nellis Air Force Base
- Conflicts: World War I World War II
- Awards: Distinguished Service Cross; Silver Star
- Other work: Founded and commanded Nellis Air Force Base

Brigadier General Martinus Stenseth (June 11, 1890 – June 25, 1979) began his career in the Minnesota National Guard in June 1916, before the United States entered World War I. He remained in the military as a professional soldier, rising to the rank of brigadier general.

== World War I ==
Stenseth was a corporal when he transferred into the U.S. Air Service in December. Following pilot training, he was sent to France in October 1917. Once transferred to the 28th Aero Squadron on 27 August 1918, Lieutenant Stenseth became its leading ace with eight confirmed aerial victories during the autumn of 1918, sharing two of his wins with the likes of Thomas Cassady and four other pilots. Stenseth won the Distinguished Service Cross for his gallantry on 22 October 1918, when he flew his Spad XIII to the aid of a beleaguered French pilot and shot down one of six German attackers, and drove the others off, despite a nearby formation of 12 more Germans.

== Post World War I ==
When the war ended, he remained in the army. He commanded several fighter squadrons during the interwar years. He served in the Philippines during the 1930s, and was Military Attache to Latvia and Finland during 1940. In 1941, he founded Nellis Air Force Base, which he commanded on two subsequent occasions. He retired in 1947.

== See also ==
- List of World War I flying aces from the United States

== Bibliography ==
- American Aces of World War I. Norman Franks, Harry Dempsey. Osprey Publishing, 2001. ISBN 1-84176-375-6, ISBN 978-1-84176-375-0.
