= Charey =

- Commune
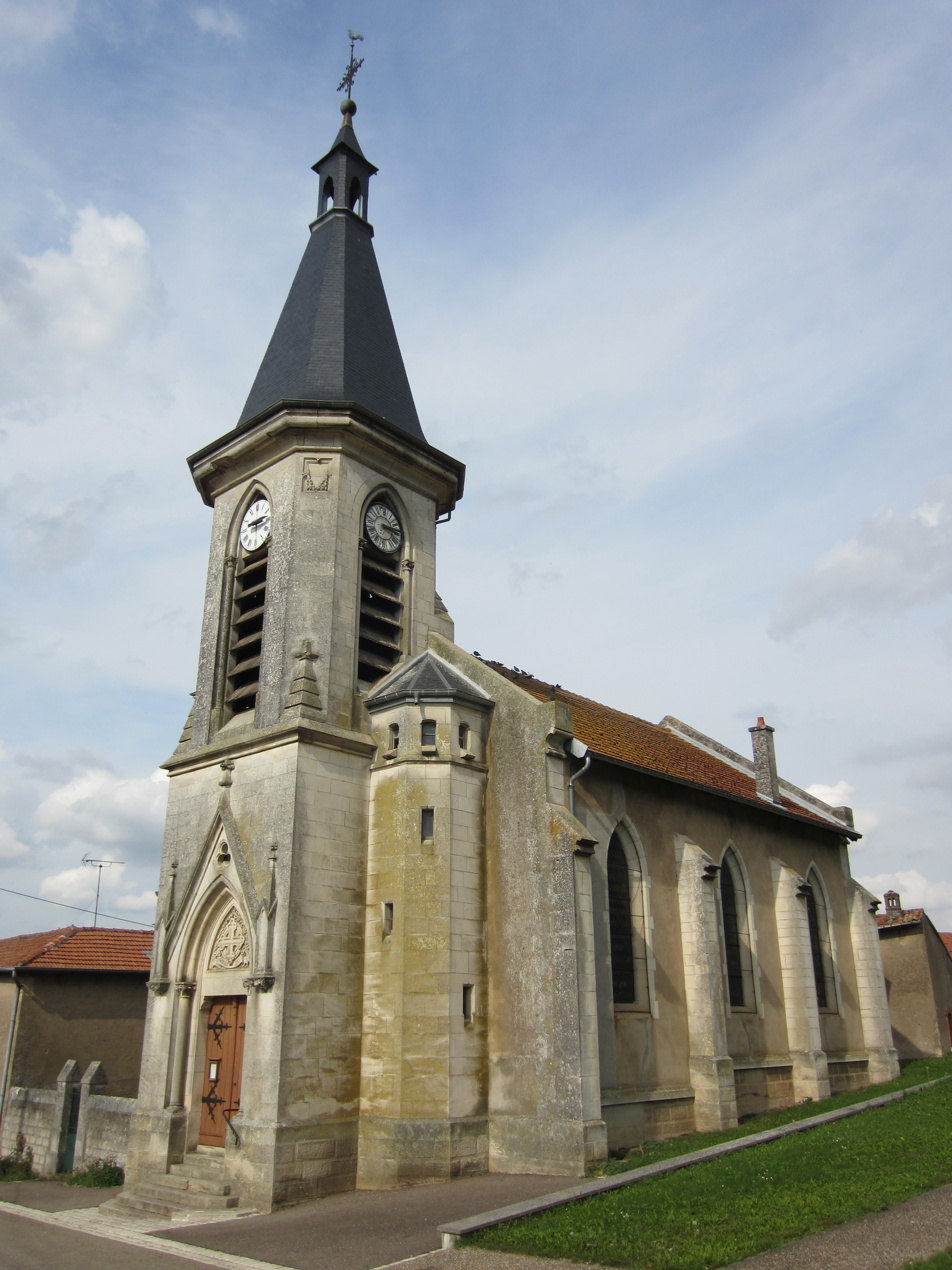
- The church in Charey

- Coat of arms
- Location of Charey
- Location within France Location within Grand Est
- Coordinates: 49°00′09″N 5°52′51″E
- Country: France
- Region: Grand Est
- Department: Meurthe-et-Moselle
- Arrondissement: Toul
- Canton: Le Nord-Toulois
- Intercommunality: Mad et Moselle

Government
  - Mayor (2020–2026): Lionel Lara
- Area^{1}: 9.31 km^{2} (3.59 sq mi)
- Elevation: 242 m (794 ft)
- Highest elevation: 312 m (1,024 ft)
- Lowest elevation: 205 m (673 ft)
- Population (2023): 88
  - Density: 9.5/km^{2} (24/sq mi)
- Time zone: UTC+01:00 (CET)
  - Summer (DST): UTC+02:00 (CEST)
- INSEE/Postal code: 54119 /54470
- ^{1} French Land Register data, which excludes lakes, ponds, glaciers > 1 km^{2} (0.386 sq mi or 247 acres) and river estuaries.

Charey (French pronunciation: [ʃaʁɛ]) is a commune in the Meurthe-et-Moselle department in north-eastern France.

== See also ==
- Communes of the Meurthe-et-Moselle department
- Parc naturel régional de Lorraine
