= Norman Cooper (RAF officer) =

American RAF officer (1888–1960)

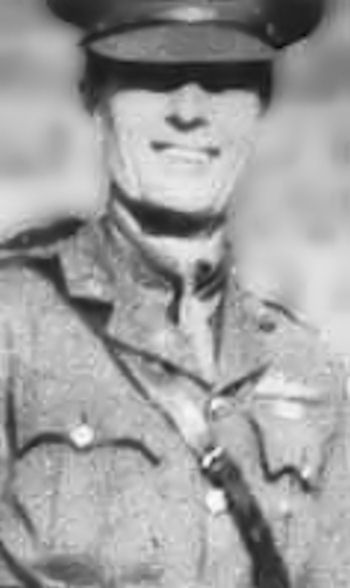
- Norman Cooper, 1918
- Born: Ernest Sidney Tooker; October 2, 1888; Gloversville, New York, United States
- Died: December 1, 1960 (aged 71–72); St. Petersburg, Florida
- Military career
- Allegiance: United States
- Branch: Canadian Militia; Royal Air Force (United Kingdom)
- Service years: 1916–1918
- Rank: Lieutenant
- Units: 3rd Canadian Division; No. 73 Squadron RAF
- Conflicts: World War I
- Awards: Military Cross

Lieutenant Norman Cooper (October 2, 1888 – December 1, 1960) was an American flying ace of the First World War, being accredited with six aerial victories. His real name was Ernest Sidney Tooker.

== Biography ==
Tooker was born in Gloversville, New York, he enlisted in Canada in 1916 under the alias Norman Cooper under the pretense of being a Canadian citizen. He initially served as a private in the 3d Canadian Division Supply Column from June 1916 until August 1917 when he transferred to the Royal Flying Corps in August 1917. Deployed to France, he flew Sopwith Camels with 73 Squadron RAF in the summer of 1918. In combat he was awarded the British Distinguished Flying Cross. Gazetted on 8 February 1919 for his actions during 1918, taking part in many low level bombing and strafing attacks. In air combat he attained six victories.

After the war, Tooker returned to the United States. He died in 1960 in St. Petersburg, Florida.

== Honors and awards ==
- Distinguished Flying Cross

2nd Lt. (A./Capt.) Norman Cooper (73rd Squadron).

"A fearless and skilful airman who has destroyed two enemy aircraft and driven down three other out of control. On 3 October, certain of our troops were held up by a body of the enemy. Observing this, Lt. Cooper dived and engaged them, driving them out of their trenches with machine-gun fire, and so enabled our troops to advance."

== See also ==
- List of World War I flying aces from the United States
