= Leslie Jacob Rummell =

American World War I flying ace

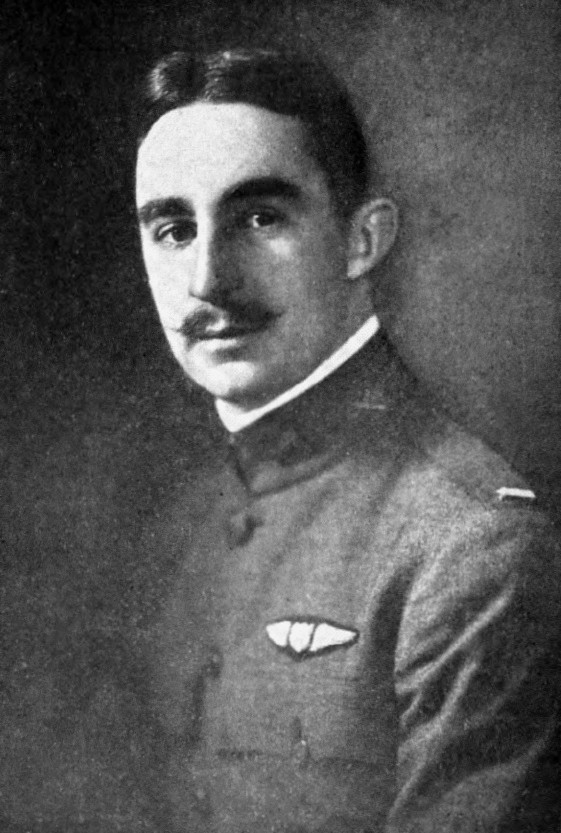
- Leslie Jacob Rummell
- Born: 21 February 1895; Newark, New Jersey
- Died: 2 February 1919 (aged 23); France
- Burial place: Thiaucourt, France
- Military career
- Allegiance: United States
- Branch: Air Service, United States Army
- Rank: Lieutenant
- Nickname: Rummy
- Unit: 93d Aero Squadron
- Conflicts: World War I
- Awards: Distinguished Service Cross

Lieutenant Leslie Jacob Rummell (1895-1919) was an American World War I flying ace credited with seven aerial victories.

== Biography ==
A graduate of Cornell University, Rummell joined the 93d Aero Squadron on 7 August 1918. He shot down his first Fokker D.VII on 12 September over Thiacourt. His triple win on the 29th, when he downed two more Fokker D.VIIs and shared a win over an Albatros two-seater, won him the Distinguished Service Cross. He went on to score three more times in October, including a shared win with Chester Wright.

Rummell died in the influenza pandemic of 1919, on 2 February.

== Honors and awards ==
Distinguished Service Cross (DSC)

The Distinguished Service Cross is presented to Leslie J. Rummell, First Lieutenant (Air Service), U.S. Army, for extraordinary heroism in action in the region of Moirey, France, September 29, 1918. Lieutenant Rummell, leading a patrol of three planes, sighted an enemy biplace airplane which was protected by seven machines (Fokker type). Despite the tremendous odds, he led his patrol to the attack and destroyed the biplace. By his superior maneuvering and leadership, four more of the enemy planes were destroyed and the remaining three retired.

== See also ==
- List of World War I flying aces from the United States

== Bibliography ==
- American Aces of World War I. Norman Franks, Harry Dempsey. Osprey Publishing, 2001. ISBN 1-84176-375-6, ISBN 978-1-84176-375-0.
