= William John MacKenzie =

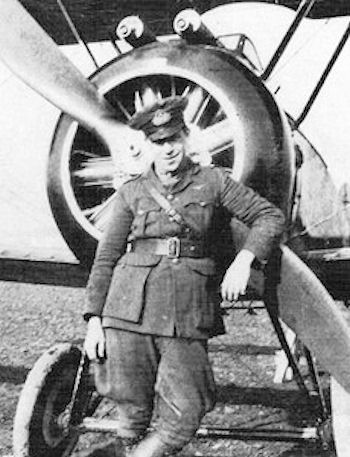
- William John MacKenzie, 1918
- Born: 9 January 1894; Memphis, Tennessee, USA
- Died: Unknown
- Military career
- Allegiance: United States
- Branch: Royal Air Force (United Kingdom)
- Service years: ca 1917-1919
- Rank: Captain
- Units: Royal Air Force: Dunkirk Seaplane Defence Flight; No. 9 Naval Squadron; No. 213 Squadron RAF
- Conflicts: World War I
- Awards: Distinguished Flying Cross, Belgian Croix de Guerre

Captain William John MacKenzie was an American flying ace who served with British naval aviation during World War I. He was wounded in action during Manfred von Richthofen's last fight. He was awarded the Distinguished Flying Cross and the Croix de Guerre for his valor. He survived the war and was discharged in 1919. His history after 1942 is unknown.

== Early life ==
William John MacKenzie was born on 9 January 1894 in Memphis, Tennessee. He worked as a draftsman in Port Robinson, Ontario, Canada before joining the Royal Naval Air Service as a probationary Flight Sub-Lieutenant on 19 April 1917.

== World War I ==
After completing training at RAF Manston and RAF Cranwell, MacKenzie was posted to the Dunkirk Seaplane Defence Flight on 30 November 1917. On 14 March 1918, he transferred to No. 9 Naval Squadron. While flying with them, he was a combatant in the 21 April 1918 dogfight in which the Red Baron was killed; MacKenzie was wounded in action that day. On 8 October 1918, he transferred back to his old unit, now renumbered as No. 213 Squadron RAF. MacKenzie ended the war credited with eight confirmed aerial victories, having earned the Belgian Croix de Guerre and the Distinguished Flying Cross. The DFC was not gazetted until 3 June 1919, The Belgian Croix de guerre was gazetted on 15 July 1919.

Although the citation for his DFC is non-descriptive, the recommendation for it is below. It gives details of MacKenzie's service as follows:

"Captain W.J. Mackenzie joined this squadron on 1 December 1917 and was employed in the Belgian Coast Patrol, where he distinguished himself by keen powers of observation and great enthusiasm for his work.

"At the end of March 1918 he was transferred to a squadron operating further south and personally succeeded in destroying one Fokker triplane, one Fokker biplane, one Phalz and one LVG two-seater (all confirmed) and also assisted in bringing down one LVF two-seater.

"He was wounded in the fight when Richtofen was killed, and was given charge of a Flight.

"He returned to this squadron in October 1918 for the last push and displayed great gallantry and leadership in the many low bombing raids against enemy troops, etc. which were undertaken in conjunction with the advancing Belgian Army.

"During this period he shot down and destroyed one Fokker biplane and shot down out of control a second, while he assisted in the destruction of one LVG two-seater.

"Altogether Captain MacKenzie has flown over the lines for upwards of 250 hours and is still one of the keenest pilots in the service."

== Post World War I ==
MacKenzie was discharged from the Royal Air Force on 20 May 1919. In 1942, he was known to be a resident in New York City while employed as a civil engineer by the Federal Works Agency.

== See also ==
- List of World War I flying aces from the United States
