= Wallace Lake (Louisiana) =

Lake in Louisiana, United States

- Location in Louisiana Location in the United States
- Location: Northwest Louisiana
- Coordinates: 32.316°N 93.708°W
- Primary outflows: Bayou Pierre Boggy Bayou Cypress Bayou
- Basin countries: United States
- Max. length: 4 mi (6.4 km)
- Max. width: .8 mi (1.3 km)
- Surface area: 3,000 to 9,000 acres (1,200 to 3,600 ha)
- Surface elevation: 143 feet (44 m) MSL (average in middle of year)
- Frozen: Never

Wallace Lake is a freshwater lake in Caddo Parish, in northwestern Louisiana, United States. The lake is much wider than it is tall. However, the actual area of the lake varies drastically annually. It can be from 3,000 to 9,000 acres (1,200 to 3,600 ha). The lake has a dam that runs water out to form Wallace Bayou, which combines with Bayou Pierre (Louisiana).

Wallace Lake

Climate chart (precipitation, max. and min. temperature)
J	F	M	A	M	J	J	A	S	O	N	D
117 10 3	142 13 3	171 19 9	130 23 14	92 26 18	128 29 21	129 28 22	66 29 22	155 28 18	124 24 11	102 19 9	160 13 5
- █ Average max. and min. temperatures in °C
- █ Precipitation totals in mm
Imperial conversion
J	F	M	A	M	J	J	A	S	O	N	D
4.6 50 37	5.6 55 37	6.7 66 48	5.1 73 57	3.6 79 64	5 84 70	5.1 82 72	2.6 84 72	6.1 82 64	4.9 75 52	4 66 48	6.3 55 41
- █ Average max. and min. temperatures in °F
- █ Precipitation totals in inches

== Ecology ==
Wallace Lake has bald cypress trees growing in the middle of it, giving it the appearance of a light forest. The lake boasts many types of fish which include northern pike, redear sunfish, crappie, catfish, carp, black bass, bream, buffalo, gar, and bowfin.

== Dam ==
The Wallace Lake Dam is a dam that sits on the east side of the lake. Wallace Bayou is formed out of the water flowing from the dam, and is eventually met by Bayou Pierre. The dam exists to prevent flooding of Bayou Pierre. The dam was constructed from July 1941 to December 1946. It is managed by the US Army Corps of Engineers. It is estimated that the dam has prevented $24.7 million in damages from occurring

== See also ==
- Cross Lake
