= Walter Carl Simon =

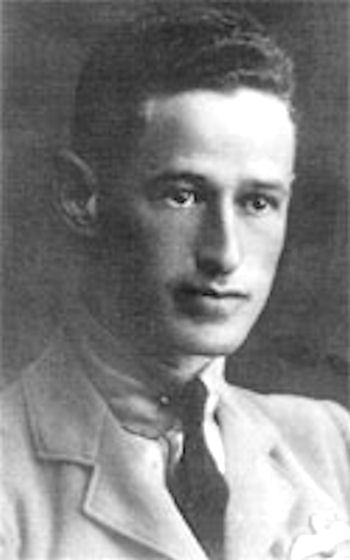
- Walter Carl Simon, 1918
- Born: September 14, 1890; New Orleans, Louisiana, USA
- Died: 16 May 1971; Kingsport, Tennessee, USA
- Military career
- Allegiance: United States
- Branch: Royal Air Force (United Kingdom)
- Rank: 2nd Lieutenant
- Units: Royal Air Force: No. 34 Squadron RAF; No. 139 Squadron RAF
- Conflicts: World War I
- Awards: Distinguished Flying Cross

Lieutenant Walter Carl Simon (1890–1971) was a World War I flying ace credited with eight aerial victories.

== Biography ==
Flying a Bristol F.2 Fighter for the British, he and his observer scored five victories on the single day of 30 July 1918; he thus became the first American "ace in a day". When the war ended, he went to Lima, Peru, where he was promoted to the rank of 1st Lieutenant and became Vice-director of the Naval Flying School at Ancon, headed by Captain Juan Swayne Leguia, former RAF pilot in World War I and son of Augusto B. Leguia, president of Peru.

== See also ==
- List of World War I flying aces from the United States

== Sources of information ==
- The History of Peruvian Aviation
