= Vaucouleurs Aerodrome =

- Part of American Expeditionary Forces (AEF)
- Located near: Vaucouleurs, France
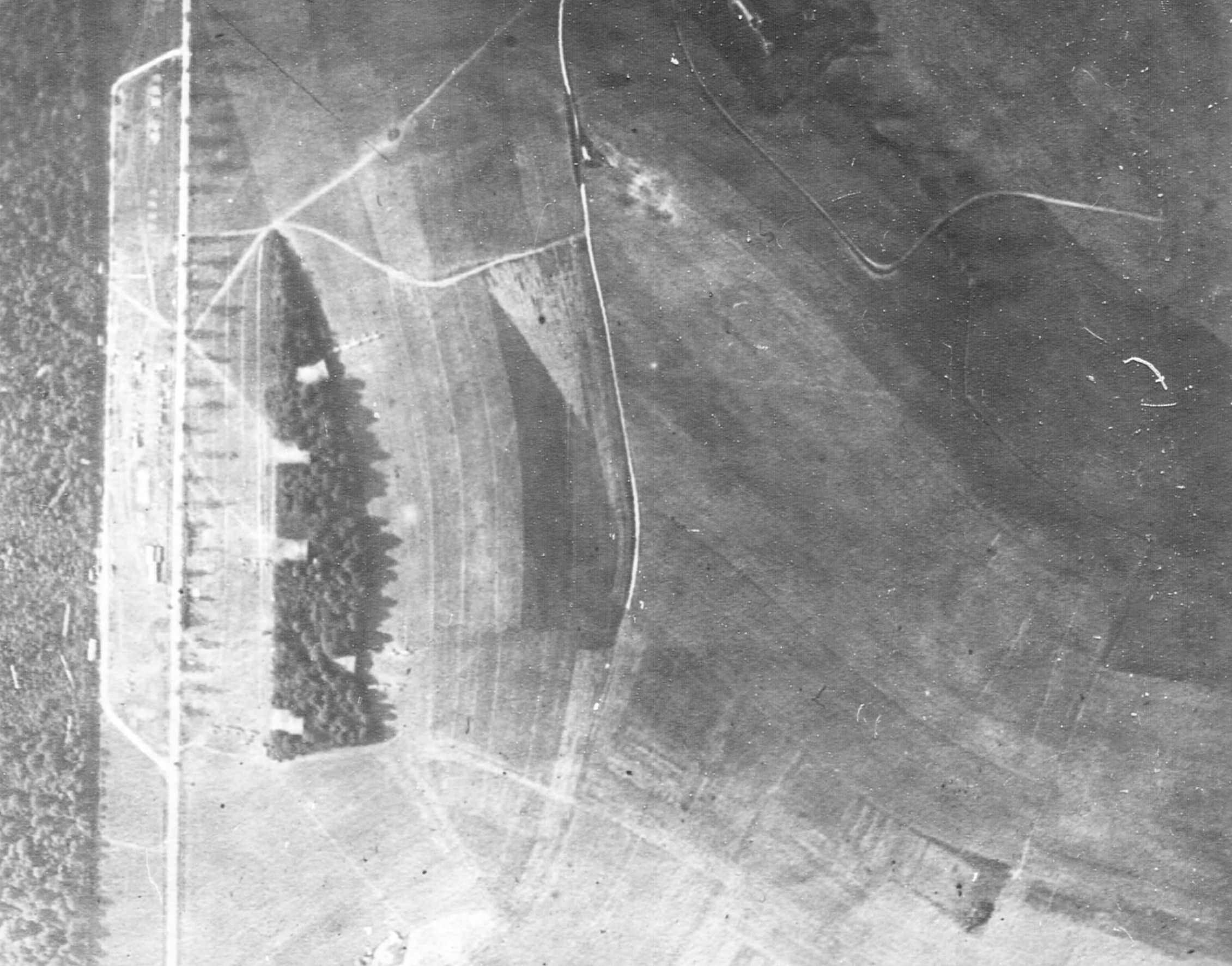
- Vaucouleurs Aerodrome - North

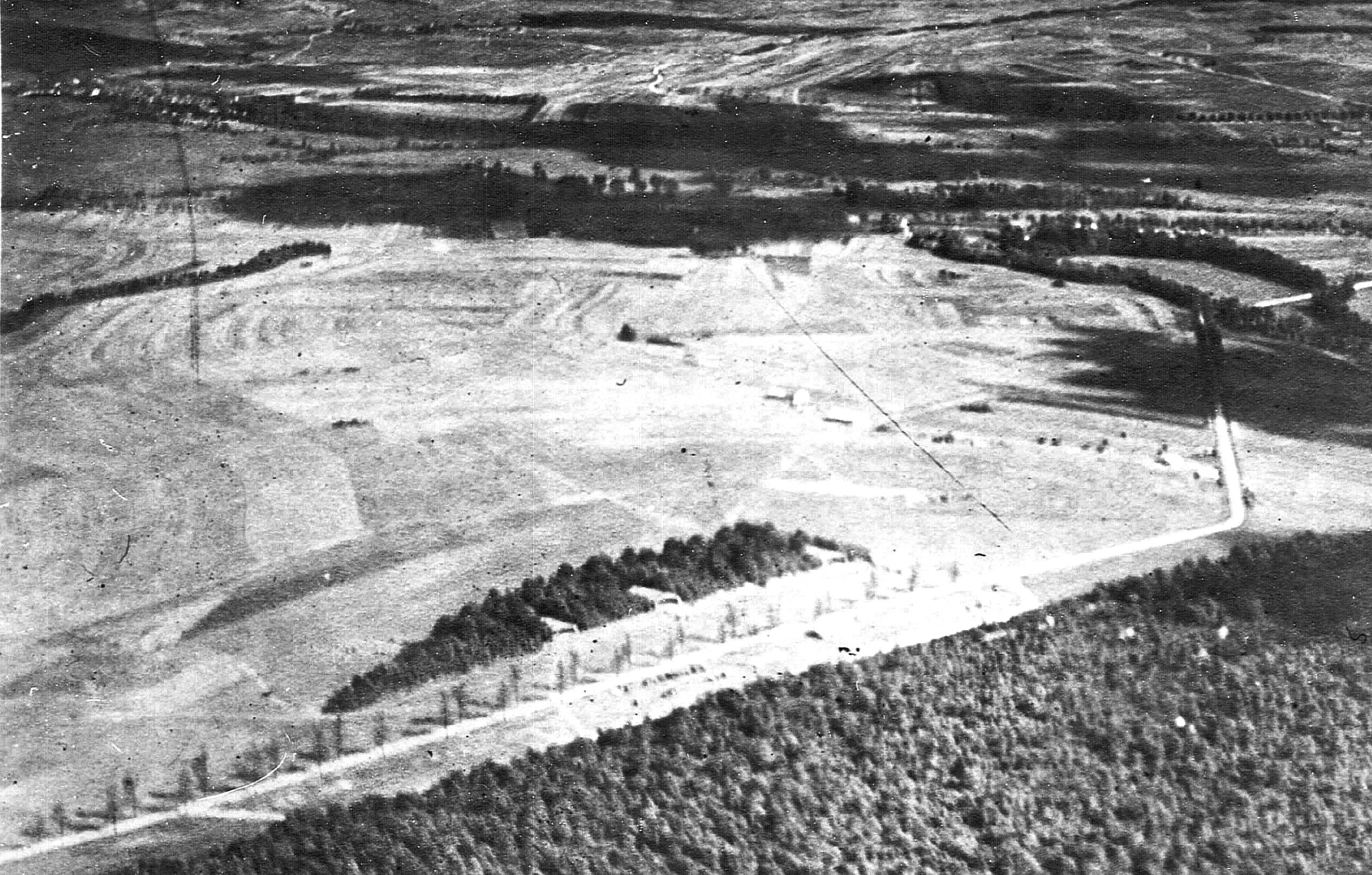
- Vaucouleurs Aerodrome - South

Site information
- Type: Combat Airfield
- Controlled by: Air Service, United States Army
- Condition: Agricultural area

Location
- Coordinates: 48°37′47″N 005°38′57″E; Vaucouleurs North Airfield; 48°36′21″N 005°38′54″E; Vaucouleurs South Airfield

Site history
- Built: 1918
- In use: 1918–1919
- Battles/wars: World War I

Garrison information
- Garrison: 3d Pursuit Group; United States First Army Air Service

Vaucouleurs Aerodrome, was a temporary World War I airfield in France. It was located 2.1 miles (3.4 km) West-Northwest of Vaucouleurs, in the Meuse department of France, and approximately 270 km (170 mi) east of Paris.

== Overview ==
The airfield was built during the spring of 1918 as a main operating base for the First Army Air Service. Two airfields were built at Vaucouleurs, Vaucouleurs (North) being constructed to the northwest of the village, the support Aerodrome built in a forested area for camouflage west of the airfield in some agricultural fields used for flying. Vaucouleurs (South) was built just to the west of the village; it was to be occupied jointly by American and French squadrons during the St Mihiel Offensive and equipped with several batteries of French landing lights so it could be used for night operations.

=== Locations ===
The site of Vaucouleurs (North) was selected for Air Service use in January 1918. The general region was chosen as the center for the future American Sector and the site was one of those available after three years of use by the French. It was located 75 kilometers from the front line, considered safe for use by pursuit (fighter) aircraft. The terrain at Vaucouleurs (North) was the first airfield built by the Americans for pursuit aircraft to be used in combat.

The ground station for Vaucouleurs (North) was located in a forested area west of the airfield. It consisted of 42 barracks and several mess halls, two buildings for maintenance ships and six warehouses for parts and gasoline. Ten buildings for constructed for headquarters and various offices, along with a Nissen hut for a hospital. A standard-gauge railroad was constructed to link with the French national railway system that connected at the village of Vaucouleurs. A series of gravel roads, along with an electrical and telephone network was constructed. The airfield had ten French Bessonnenux aircraft hangars erected both on the south of the airfield and also in a wooded area east of the main road to Vaucouleurs.

Vaucouleurs (South) was developed in the Summer of 1918, being leased in June. It was on top of a hill surrounded by thick woodland and had been used as pastureland. It was free of the usual narrow fields of cultivated land. The corner of the woods near the adjacent highway had been used as a park before 1914, and was laced with paths, giving an ideal shelter for personnel. The forest to the west also provided both camouflage for the hangars.

The ground station for Vaucouleurs (South) had a total of thirty-two barracks and mess halls, five buildings for warehousing and maintenance shops, and six administration buildings. Also two Nissen Huts were set up as a hospital and eight Bessonnenux hangars in wooded areas adjacent to the flying airfield.

=== Operations ===
It was initially used by the 139th Aero Squadron, Air Service, United States Army, beginning at the end of May, shortly after finishing its combat training at the 3d Air Instructional Center at Issoudun Aerodrome. At Vaucouleurs, the squadron flew SPAD VIIs and primarily was engaged in training flights and reconnaissance along the lines. A major difficulty was the lack of supplies and equipment necessary to keep the SPAD VIIs operational. On 30 June, the squadron was reassigned to the 2d Pursuit Group and moved to Croix-de-Metz Aerodrome, near Toul.

In July five pursuit squadrons were moved to Vaucouleurs, and headquarters of the 3d Pursuit Group was established there on 30 July. To accommodate five squadrons of aircraft, two airfields were established, Vaucouleurs North and Vaucouleurs South. From the aerodrome, the group carried out offensive operations during the St. Mihiel Offensive and also over the Toul Sector. At the end of September, the Group moved to Lisle-en-Barrois Aerodrome, in preparation for the Meuse-Argonne Offensive. Afterwards, Vaucouleurs Aerodrome was unused for the remainder of the war.

=== Closure ===
Shortly after the armistice in November 1918, the Airdrome and both airfields were turned over to the 1st Air Depot for de-construction. All hangars and other structures were dismantled and all useful supplies and equipment were removed and sent back to the Depot for storage. Upon completion, the land turned over to the French government.

Eventually the land was returned to agricultural use by the local farmers. Today, what was Vaucouleurs Airdrome is located to the east of the Départmental 964 (D964), north of Vaucouleurs. Vaucouleurs South is located to the northwest of the town, to the north of the D960. Both airfields are now cultivated fields, with no indications of their wartime use.

== Known units assigned ==
- Headquarters, 3d Pursuit Group, 30 July – 20 September 1918
  - 139th Aero Squadron (Pursuit), 28 May – 30 June 1918
  - 28th Aero Squadron (Pursuit), 16 July – 20 September 1918
  - 49th Aero Squadron (Pursuit), 28 July – 2 August 1918
  - 213th Aero Squadron (Pursuit), 26 July – 24 September 1918
  - 93d Aero Squadron (Pursuit), 28 July – 24 September 1918
  - 103d Aero Squadron (Pursuit), 7 August – 20 September 1918

== See also ==
- List of Air Service American Expeditionary Force aerodromes in France
