= 28th Aero Squadron =

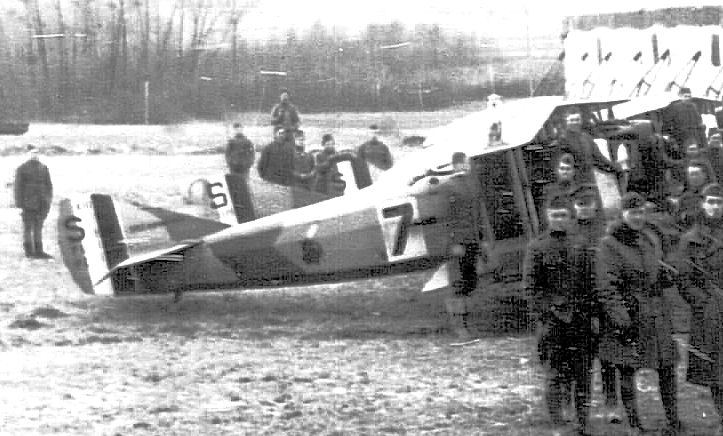
- 28th Aero Squadron, SPAD S.XIII, 18 November 1918
- Active: 22 June 1917 – 16 June 1919
- Country: United States
- Branch: United States Army Air Service
- Type: Squadron
- Role: Pursuit
- Part of: American Expeditionary Forces (AEF)
- Fuselage Code: "Indian Head"
- Engagements: World War I

Commanders
- Notable commanders: Capt. C. Maury Jones

Insignia
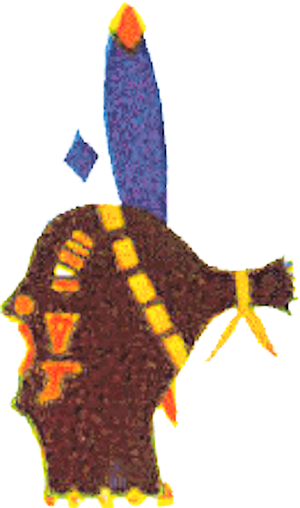
- 28th Aero Squadron Emblem

Aircraft flown
- Fighter: SPAD S.VII, 1918–1919; SPAD S.XIII, 1918–1919
- Trainer: Curtiss JN-4, 1917

Service record
- Operations: 3d Pursuit Group; Western Front, France: 22 August – 11 November 1918: Sorties: 981; Combat missions: 129; Enemy combats: 29; Killed: 5; Wounded: 1; Missing: 5; Aircraft lost: 12
- Victories: Enemy Aircraft shot down: 15; Enemy Balloons shot down: 0; Total Enemy Aircraft Destroyed: 15; Air Aces: 2: Capt. Thomas G. Cassady, 4 (3 shared)* * Cassady had a total of 9 aerial victories, 5 of which (along with 3 probables) were earned with Spa163 of the French Air Service before joining the 28th A.S.; Lt. Martinus Stenseth, 8 (3 shared)

The 28th Aero Squadron was a United States Army Air Service unit that fought on the Western Front during World War I.

The squadron was assigned as a Day Pursuit (Fighter) Squadron as part of the 3d Pursuit Group, First United States Army. Its mission was to engage and clear enemy aircraft from the skies and provide escort to reconnaissance and bombardment squadrons over enemy territory. It also attacked enemy observation balloons, and perform close air support and tactical bombing attacks of enemy forces along the front lines. After the 1918 Armistice with Germany, the squadron returned to the United States in June 1919 and was demobilized.

The current United States Air Force unit which holds its lineage and history is the 28th Bomb Squadron, assigned to the 7th Operations Group, Dyess Air Force Base, Texas.

== History ==
=== Origins ===
The squadron was first assembled at Kelly Field, San Antonio, Texas, on 10 February 1917. At the time, there were about 20 men assigned to the unit. The first few months were spent on learning the rudiments of soldiering, and it was not until 22 June that the squadron received its official designation.

Orders were received that the squadron would be attached to the British Royal Flying Corps for training, and the 22d was assigned to their flying school in Toronto, Ontario, Canada. The squadron left Kelly Field on 22 August 1917, arriving at the recruiting depot at Leaside, Toronto on the evening of the 25th. After a few days of rest to become accustomed to the new surroundings, the squadron was split up by the RFC to be placed at the different schools for instruction. Squadron Headquarters was assigned to the school at Deseronto, for training under the 43d Wing, RFC. Another detachment proceeded to Camp Borden, Ontario under the 42d Wing, RFC. The remainder of the squadron were placed in different schools and on the flying fields in the vicinity of Toronto. In Canada, the squadron was trained in aircraft construction, overhaul, upkeep, motor transport work, aerial gunnery and other skills.

At the end of October, the squadron was re-assembled at Leaside. New orders were received and the 28th was transferred to Everman Field (#1), Camp Taliaferro, near Fort Worth, Texas, for additional RFC training. At Everman Field, those men selected as pilots were taught to fly the Curtiss JN-4 "Jenny" trainer. Late in December, flying training practically ceased on account of cold weather and rumors abounded about being sent overseas. Upon completion of the flying training, the cadets were commissioned as officers and assigned to the squadron as First Lieutenants.

On 21 January 1918 the squadron was ordered to proceed to Garden City, Long Island, New York for overseas deployment. The 22d arrived on the 26th. Due to an epidemic of fever, the squadron was immediately quarantined, although the men was allowed to spend time in New York City as passes were plentiful. Finally on 25 February, the squadron was embarked on the troop transport HMS 527, better known as the White Star Liner RMS Olympic at New York Harbor, Pier 54. The trans-Atlantic trip was uneventful until the second day out of Liverpool, England when the ship was picked up by four US Navy destroyers. That afternoon, all on board were suddenly alarmed by a heavy explosion, followed by several smaller detonations which shook the big ship from bow to stern. A German U-boat was being attacked by the destroyers, with one of them passing directly over the destroyer, dropping depth charges in the attack. The trip to England ended the next day about noon, however the 22d did not disembark the ship until the following morning, 6 March 1918.

After disembarking, the squadron was marched from the docks to the Liverpool railway station where it boarded a London and North Western Railway train which took them to Winchester in Hampshire, near the south coast of England. Arriving in the late afternoon the squadron was moved to the Romsey Rest Camp. At Romsey, the squadron was split up into four flights and the pilots were ordered transferred to Royal Air Force Airdromes in England for combat flying training. On 17 March the non-flying personnel were moved to the Southampton docks and embarked on the Channel boat "Archimdos", leaving about 18:30. Overnight was spent on the boat and daybreak found the ship in the harbor of Le Havre, Upper Normandy, France. The men disembarked about 16:30 and were moved to a rest camp on the hills above the city.

=== Training in France ===
At the rest camp, orders were received for "C" Flight to proceed to Villers-Bretonneux, Picardy, to be attached to No. 25 Squadron RAF. 25 Sqn was equipped with Airco DH-4s and doing day bombing. The flight entrained at once and arrived at the Airdrome on the 20th. The remainder of the squadron entrained on the morning of 19 March for Hazebrouck, Nord-Pas-de-Calais, arriving there on the 20th. Here the Flights were met and told to get out of the town rapidly as possible as the Germans were shelling the town with 15-inch shells once a minute. Headquarters and "A" Flight went to join No. 57 Squadron RFC at Sainte-Marie-Cappel, Nord-Pas-de-Calais, "B" Flight went to join No. 18 Squadron RFC at the Treizennes Aerodrome, south of Aire sur la Lys, and "C" Flight further east at the Villers-Bretonneux aerodrome with No. 25 Squadron RFC.

The officers and men were growing accustomed to the work and surroundings when the German 1918 Spring Offensive began on 21 March. This necessitated movements and a great deal of work as all Flights were attached to bombing units and three or four raids were being carried out daily. On the late afternoon of 25, 25 March Sqn, to which Flight "C" was attached, was hurriedly moved back as the Germans were driving on Amiens. On 1 April, Headquarters and "A" Flight were detached from 57 Squadron and attached to No. 20 Squadron RAF, equipped with the Bristol F.2 Fighter. On 7 April "B" Flight was reassigned to No. 40 Squadron RAF. During this time the Germans had started their drive for the French Channel ports in the region south of Ypres. Enemy artillery was shelling the Airdrome at Treizennes, forcing 18 Squadron, 40 Squadron and "B" Flight to move to safer quarters on 8 April on Bruay aerodrome (?). By 12 April, the Germans were in light artillery range of Sainte-Marie-Cappel. There Headquarters Flight was moved out and attached to No. 206 Squadron RAF, equipped with Airco DH.9 day bombers on Boisdinghem aerodrome. "A" Flight was re-attached to No. 98 Squadron RAF, also equipped with DH.9s at Alquines. On 15 April, Headquarters Flight also was assigned to 98 Sqn. On 25 May 98 Squadron and "A" Flight were moved to the Coudekerque aerodrome, in the outskirts of Dunkirk, however, the enemy bombed the field on the night of 5 June, causing much damage, being considered the worst that any Airdrome experienced. The next morning a move was made to Ruisseauville where 98 Sqn joined with 25 Sqn and "C" Flight.

By the end of June, rumors were persistent that the 28th Squadron would be re-assembled and work at a unit. These rumors turned out to be true and on the 24th the squadron was re-assembled at Wizernes aerodrome, near St. Omer, and then proceeded by train to the 3rd Aviation Instruction Center, on Issoudun Aerodrome, arriving on the 28th. Here, the men were placed in training for major aircraft repair, and were hard at work learning new skills. On 7 July, the squadron was moved to Orly, Paris for additional training. Also at Orly, the Air Echelon, which had been training with the RAF was reassigned to the squadron. On 14 July, the squadron entrained at Paris for Toul to return to the front.

=== Combat operations ===
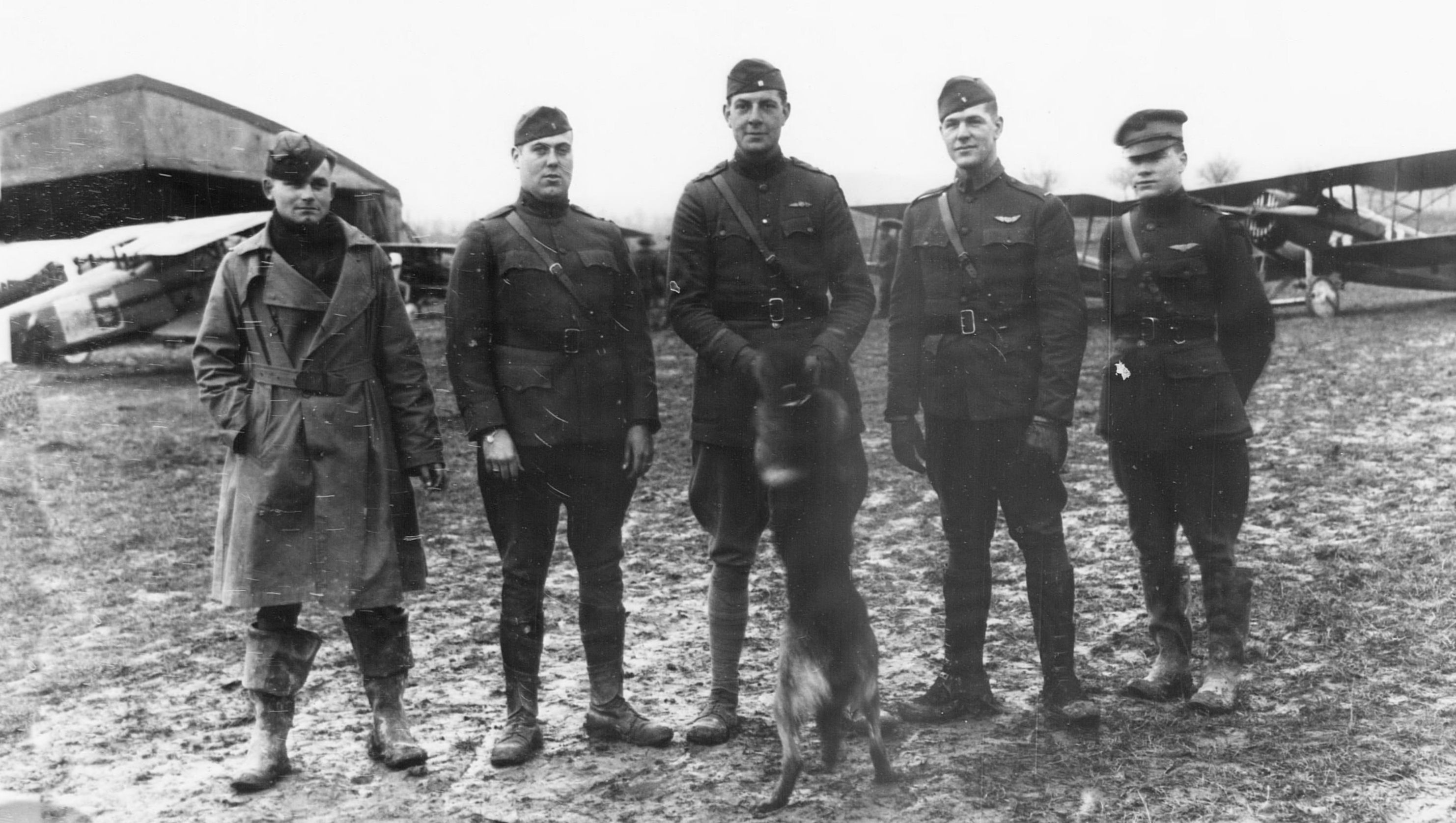
28th Aero Squadron Command staff, November 1918

The 28th Aero Squadron arrived at Croix de Metz Aerodrome, Toul, on 15 July and was assigned to the 3d Pursuit Group, First Army, being moved to Vaucouleurs Aerodrome in Lorraine. At Vaucouleurs, the squadron was equipped initially with SPAD S.VII pursuit aircraft, which were later replaced by SPAD S.XIIIs. Training flights were carried out performing line patrols and staying in friendly territory. By 1 September, everything was in readiness; the following day the squadron would begin active combat operations. The squadron's first combat patrol, from 10:00 to 11:55 on 2 September was at an altitude of 5,000 m (16,000 ft). Three planes patrolled the Toul Sector in the region of Saint-Mihiel and Pent-a-Heussen. Between 15:35 and 17:45 planes again patrolled the same region and reported a significant amount of anti-aircraft fire, but inaccurate. For the next week, the squadron continued patrolling over the sector, but did not engage in any offensive operations until the 12th when the squadron equipped with bombs crossed the line into enemy territory as part of the St. Mihiel offensive and flying at an altitude of about 50 meters attacked troops and transport vehicles. A horse-drawn convoy was also spotted and attacked. The patrol returned to Vaucouleurs without losses.

Additional bombing and strafing attacks with machine guns on roads and troop encampments were made for the next two days as part of the Offensive, and on 15 September a special mission came through for one plane to take off at 10:45. This mission was to attack an enemy observation balloon north-east of Chambley however the pilot did not find a balloon in the area and returned safely. Later that same day, a second special patrol was ordered for the protection of two 135th Aero Squadron Airco DH.4 day bombers. The escort mission followed a route from Thiacourt, then to the northwest. It was accomplished successfully with no losses.

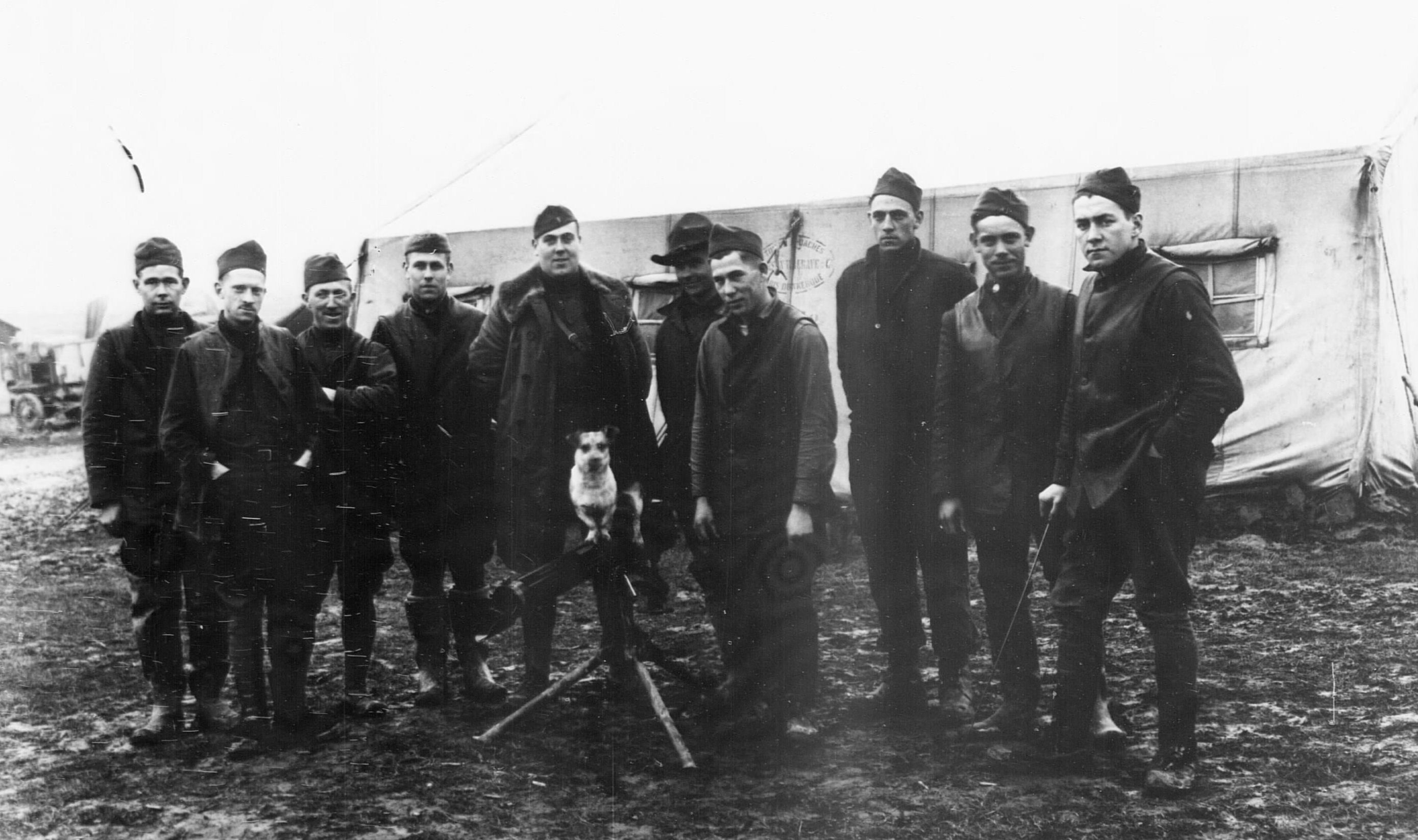
Squadron lead Non-Commissioned officers (with camp mascot dog on a machine gun), November 1918

On 20 September, the squadron was moved to Lisle-en-Barrois aerodrome, about 30 miles to the north-west of Vaucouleurs to move closer to the front after the advance from St. Mihiel. Following several non-flying days due to rain, defense patrols along the line in this sector continued until 26 September when eight aircraft flew a reconnaissance mission deep behind German lines to the area around Hernoment in which a long train was spotted heading south. A large number of trucks were also seen and reported back upon return. Another patrol by the squadron to escort seven DH.4s on a bombing mission. Seven German Fokkers were intercepted, however no aircraft were shot down by either side.

With the Meuse-Argonne offensive starting on 26 September, more bomber escort missions were undertaken though the end of the month. Combat missions were undertaken throughout October supporting the offensive with bombing and escort missions over enemy territory in support of First Army. On 6 November orders were received to move the squadron to a new Airdrome at Foucaucourt, with the squadron being reassigned to the 2d Pursuit Group. From there bombing escort missions and raids against enemy forces in their territory north of Verdun as the ground forces advance to the north continued.

The last patrols of the war were carried out on the morning of 10 November when bombing raids was ordered to attack any of these following points: Merge, Meulin, Billy, Seus Magines, St. Laurent, Marville, Quiny, Lamsuilly, Reute, Feucaucourt, Verdun Etain, Maranville, and Feuancourt. The 28th carried out escort missions for the bombers and also machine-gunned enemy troops and vehicles when located. Upon the return of the aircraft that afternoon a great joy spread over the entire field and everyone was out to greet the good news about the pending armistice. The pilots and staff of the squadron celebrated by gathering in the mess hall and "had a jovial time". A patrol was scheduled for the early morning of 11 November, however it was cancelled due to rain. As 11:00, it was announced by the Squadron Commander that flying over enemy territory would cease from that moment on, as the armistice had been signed and the war was over.

=== Demobilization ===
After the signing of the Armistice on 11 November 1918, the 28th Aero Squadron awaited demobilization. On 16 April 1919 orders were received from HQ AEF that the Second Army Air Service was being demobilized and for the squadron to report to the 1st Air Depot, Colombey-les-Belles Airdrome to turn in all of its supplies and equipment and was relieved from duty with the AEF. The squadron's SPAD aircraft were delivered to the Air Service American Air Service Acceptance Park No. 1 at Orly Aerodrome to be returned to the French. There practically all of the pilots and observers were detached from the squadron.

Personnel at Colombey were subsequently assigned to the commanding general, services of supply, and ordered to report to a staging camp at Le Mans, France. There, personnel awaited scheduling to report to one of the Base Ports in France for transport to the United States. Sailing from Brest aboard the USS Liberator on 3 June, the 12th arrived at Garden City, New York, on 17 June 1919 The squadron was demobilized on 16 June 1919.

=== Lineage ===
- Organized as 28th Aero Squadron on 22 June 1917

Re-designated: 28th Aero Squadron (Pursuit), 15 July 1918
Demobilized on 16 June 1919

=== Commanding officers ===
- Captain J. R. Alfonte
- Major P. Frissell: 14 July 1917
- Major C. A. Brown
- Captain C. Maury Jones

=== Assignments ===
- Post Headquarters, Kelly Field, 22 June 1917
- Aviation Section, U.S. Signal Corps, 22 August 1917

Attached to the Royal Flying Corps for training entire period

- Aviation Concentration Center, 26 January – 5 March 1918
- Air Service Headquarters, AEF, British Isles,

Attached to: Royal Flying Corps for training, 19 March – 24 June 1918

- 3d Air Instructional Center, 24 June 1918
- Air Service Acceptance Park No. 1, 8 July 1918
- 3d Pursuit Group, 15 July 1918
- 2d Pursuit Group, 6 November 1918 (to be confirmed).
- Second Army Air Service, 11 December 1918
- 1st Air Depot, AEF, 15 April – 4 May 1919
- Commanding General, Services of Supply, 2 May – 1 June 1919
- Post Headquarters, Hazelhurst Field, 15–17 June 1919

=== Stations ===
- Kelly Field, Texas, 22 June 1917
- Toronto, Ontario, Canada, 22 August 1917

Detachment at: Deseronto, Ontario
Detachment at: Camp Borden, Ontario

- Everman Field (#2), Camp Taliaferro, Texas, 28 October – 21 January 1918
- Aviation Concentration Center, Garden City, New York, 26 January 1918
- Port of Entry, Hoboken, New Jersey

Trans-Atlantic crossing: RMS Olympic (HMS 527)

- Liverpool, England, 5 March 1918
- Romsey RC, Winchester, England, 6 March 1918

Air Echelon attached to RAF for continued combat flight training

- Le Havre, France, 19 March 1918

- Hazebrouck Airdrome, Nord-Pas-de-Calais, 20 March 1918

Ground Echelon separated into Flights for support training with RAF

Headquarters and "A" Flight

- Attached to: No. 57 Squadron RAF

Sainte-Marie-Cappel Aerodrome, 21 March – 1 April 1918

- Attached to: No. 20 Squadron RAF

Sainte-Marie-Cappel Aerodrome, 1–12 April 1918

- HQ Flight attached to: No. 206 Squadron RAF

Boisdinghem Aerodrome 12–15 April 1918.

- Attached to: No. 98 Squadron RAF

Alquines Aerodrome, 12 April – 25 May 1918
Coudekerque Aerodrome 25 May – 6 June 1918
Ruisseauville Aerodrome 6–24 June 1918

"B" Flight

- Attached to: No. 18 Squadron RAF

Treizennes Aerodrome, 21 March – 7 April 1918

- Attached to: No. 40 Squadron RAF

Bruay Aerodrome 7 April – 23 June 1918

"C" Flight

- Attached to: No. 25 Squadron RAF

Villers-Bretonneux Airdrome, 20–25 March 1918
Hazebrouck Aerodrome, 25 March – 8 April 1918
Ruisseauville Aerodrome, 8 April – 23 June 1918

- Saint-Omer Aerodrome, Nord-Pas-de-Calais, 24–27 June 1918
- Issoudun Aerodrome, Centre, 24–27 June 1918
- Orly Airport, Paris, 8 July 1918
- Croix de Metz Aerodrome, Toul, 15 July 1918
- Vaucouleurs Aerodrome, Lorraine, 16 July 1918
- Lisle-en-Barrois Aerodrome, Lorraine, 20 September 1918
- Foucaucourt Aerodrome, Lorraine, 6 November 1918
- Grand Airdrome, 15 February 1919
- Colombey-les-Belles Airdrome, 15 April 1919
- Le Mans, Airdrome, 4–19 May 1919
- Mitchel Field, New York, 31 May – 16 June 1919.

=== Combat sectors and campaigns ===
Streamer	Sector/Campaign	Dates	Notes
	Somme Defensive Campaign	21 March – 6 April 1918	
	Lys Defensive Campaign	9–27 April 1918	
	Ypres Sector (Belgium)	28 April – 24 June 1918	
	Champagne-Marne Defensive Campaign	15–18 July 1918	
	Aisne-Marne Offensive Campaign	18 July – 6 August 1918	
	Toul Sector	2–11 September 1918	
	St. Mihiel Offensive Campaign	12–16 September 1918	
	Meuse-Argonne Offensive Campaign	26 September – 11 November 1918	

=== Notable personnel ===
- Captain Thomas Cassady, DSC (2x), POW, air ace, Nine confirmed victories (four while with squadron)
- Captain Martinus Stenseth, DSC, SSC, air ace, Seven confirmed aerial victories

DSC: Distinguished Service Cross; SSC: Silver Star Citation; POW: Prisoner of War

== See also ==
- Organization of the Air Service of the American Expeditionary Force
- List of American aero squadrons
