= 213th Aero Squadron =

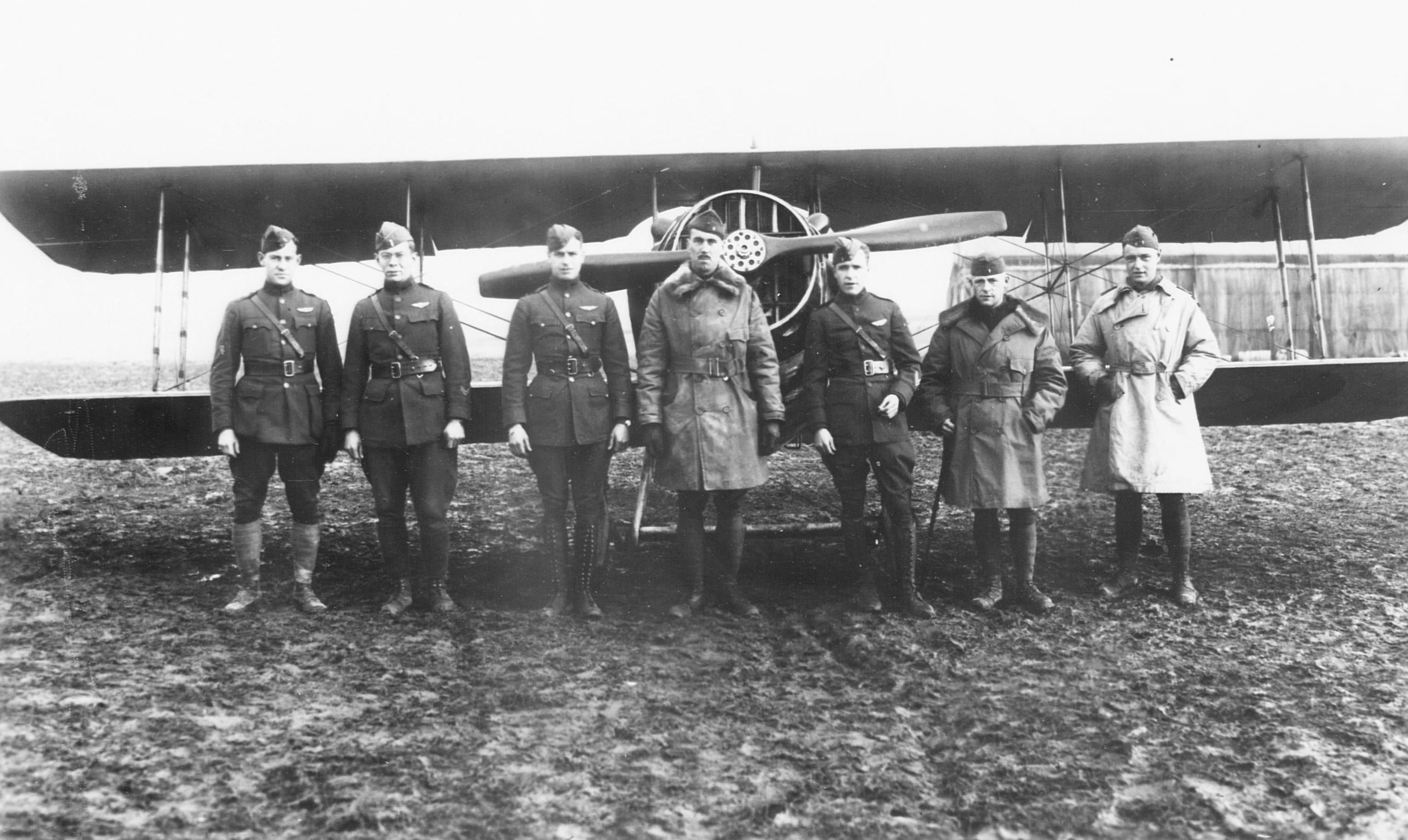
- Lt. Charles Grey (Center) and pilots of the 213th Aero Squadron, and a SPAD XIII, Foucaucourt Aerodrome, France, November 1918
- Active: 1 December 1917 – 30 June 1919
- Country: United States
- Branch: United States Army Air Service
- Type: Squadron
- Role: Pursuit
- Part of: American Expeditionary Forces (AEF)
- Fuselage Code: "Indian Head"
- Engagements: World War I

Commanders
- Notable commanders: Capt. John A. Hambleton

Insignia
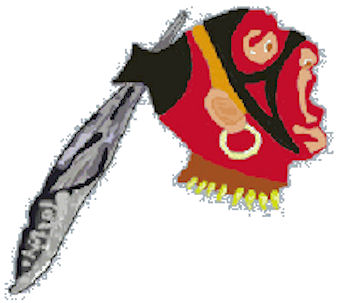
- 213th Aero Squadron Emblem

Aircraft flown
- Fighter: SPAD VII, 1918; SPAD XIII, 1918

Service record
- Operations: 3d Pursuit Group; Western Front, France: 14 August-11 November 1918: Sorties: 1,232; Combat missions: 248; Enemy combats: 38; Killed: 3; Wounded: 2; Missing: 7; Aircraft lost: 15
- Victories: Enemy Aircraft shot down: 15; Enemy Balloons shot down: 1; Total Enemy Aircraft Destroyed: 16; Air Aces: 1: Capt. Charles G. Grey. 5 (3 shared)

The 213th Aero Squadron was a United States Army Air Service unit that fought on the Western Front during World War I.

The squadron was assigned as a Day Pursuit (Fighter) Squadron as part of the 3d Pursuit Group, First United States Army. Its mission was to engage and clear enemy aircraft from the skies and provide escort to reconnaissance and bombardment squadrons over enemy territory. It also attacked enemy observation balloons, and perform close air support and tactical bombing attacks of enemy forces along the front lines. After the 1918 Armistice with Germany, the squadron returned to the United States in June 1919 and was demobilized.

The squadron was never reactivated and there is no current United States Air Force or Air National Guard successor unit.

== History ==
=== Origins ===
The 213th Aero Squadron was formed from a cadres of men from the 15th, 23d, and 100th Aero Squadrons that were organized at Kelly Field, Texas on 1 December 1917. The men, already having been indoctrinated into basic soldiering, were transferred to the Aviation Concentration Center, Garden City, Long Island, on 7 January 1918 for overseas duty. They boarded HMS Tuscania on 24 January 1918, bound for duty in Europe.

=== HMS Tuscania sinking ===
After an initially unremarkable voyage, On the morning of 5 February Tuscania turned south for the North Channel en route to Liverpool. Most of those aboard, in sight of the Irish coast to starboard and the Scottish coast to port, surely believed the worst part of their journey was behind them. Spotted by the German submarine SM UB-77 earlier in the day, however, their convoy was stalked until early evening and the cover of darkness. Then, at about 6:40 pm, submarine captain Lt. Cdr. Wilhelm Meyer ordered two torpedoes fired at Tuscania. The second of these struck home, sending the ship – within about four hours – to the bottom of the Channel.

According to the squadron history, "nothing can be gained by describing, or attempting to describe, the horror of it all. Suffice to say that as a result of Hunnish Hate, five members of the squadron were buried on the Island of Islay."

=== Training ===
After being rescued, the squadron, less clothing and its equipment was concentrated at a rest camp at Winchester, England. At Winchester, the squadron was assigned to the Royal Flying Corps for training at RFC Ayre, Scotland, on 20 February. There, the men were fully equipped and its pilots began training at the No.1 School, Aerial Fighting. The men were also trained, along with British mechanics on Bristol fighters, SE-5s, Sopwith Camels, Dolphins, Bristol Scouts and Avros. On 15 June, the squadron, now trained was ordered to Winchester, where a final inspection was made before being ordered on 28 June to proceed to France.

After a cross-channel trip to Le Havre, the 213th Aero Squadron arrived at the 3d Air Instruction Center, Issoudun Aerodrome, on 23 July. However its stay at Issodun was brief, as it was classified as a Pursuit squadron and ordered to proceed directly into combat being assigned to the 3d Pursuit Group at Vaucouleurs Aerodrome in the Zone of Advance (Western Front).

=== Combat on the Western Front ===
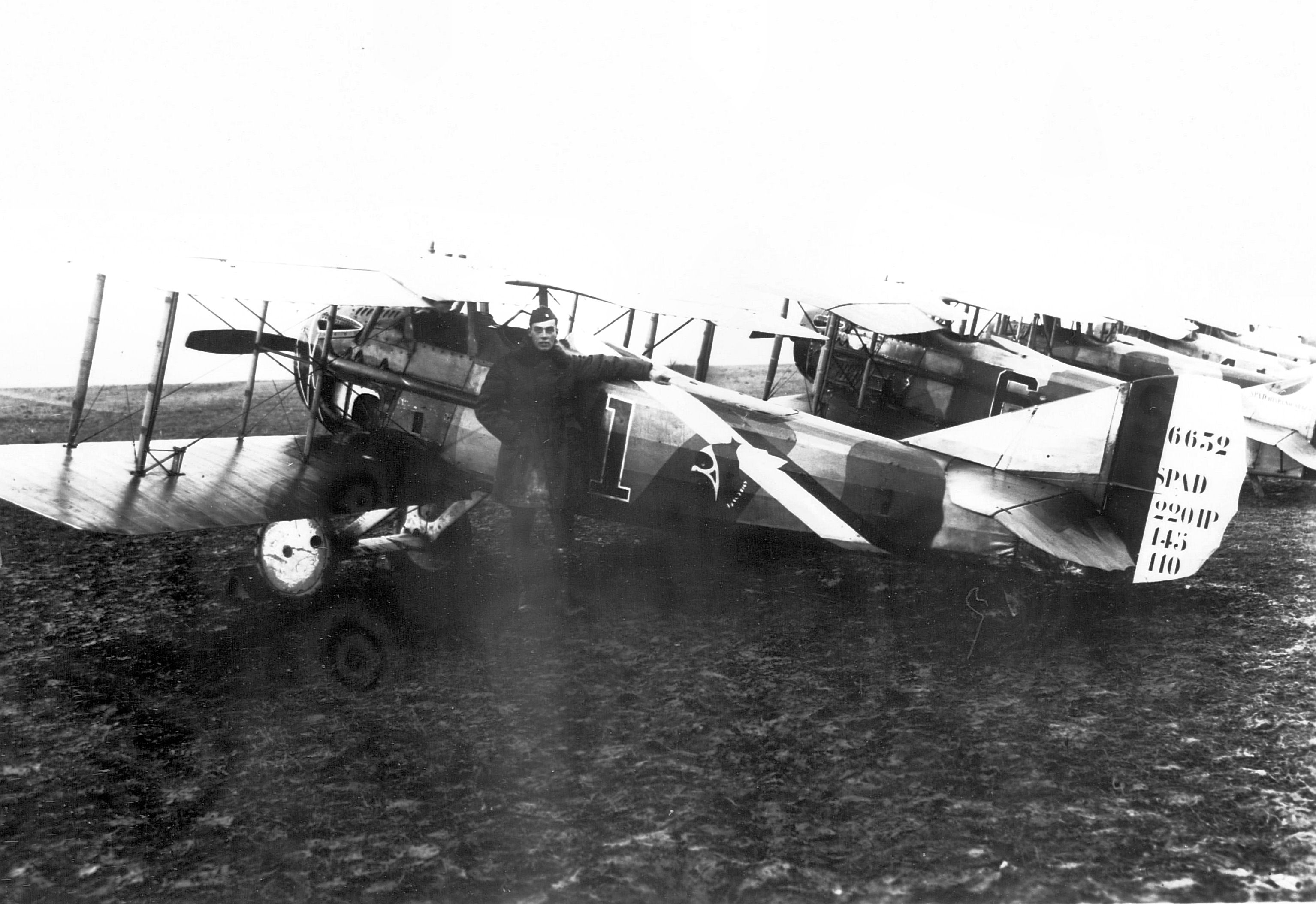
Capt John Hambleton next to his SPAD XIII, Foucaucourt Aerodrome, France. Lt Lee's aircraft coded "6" serial number S. 7731 in the background.

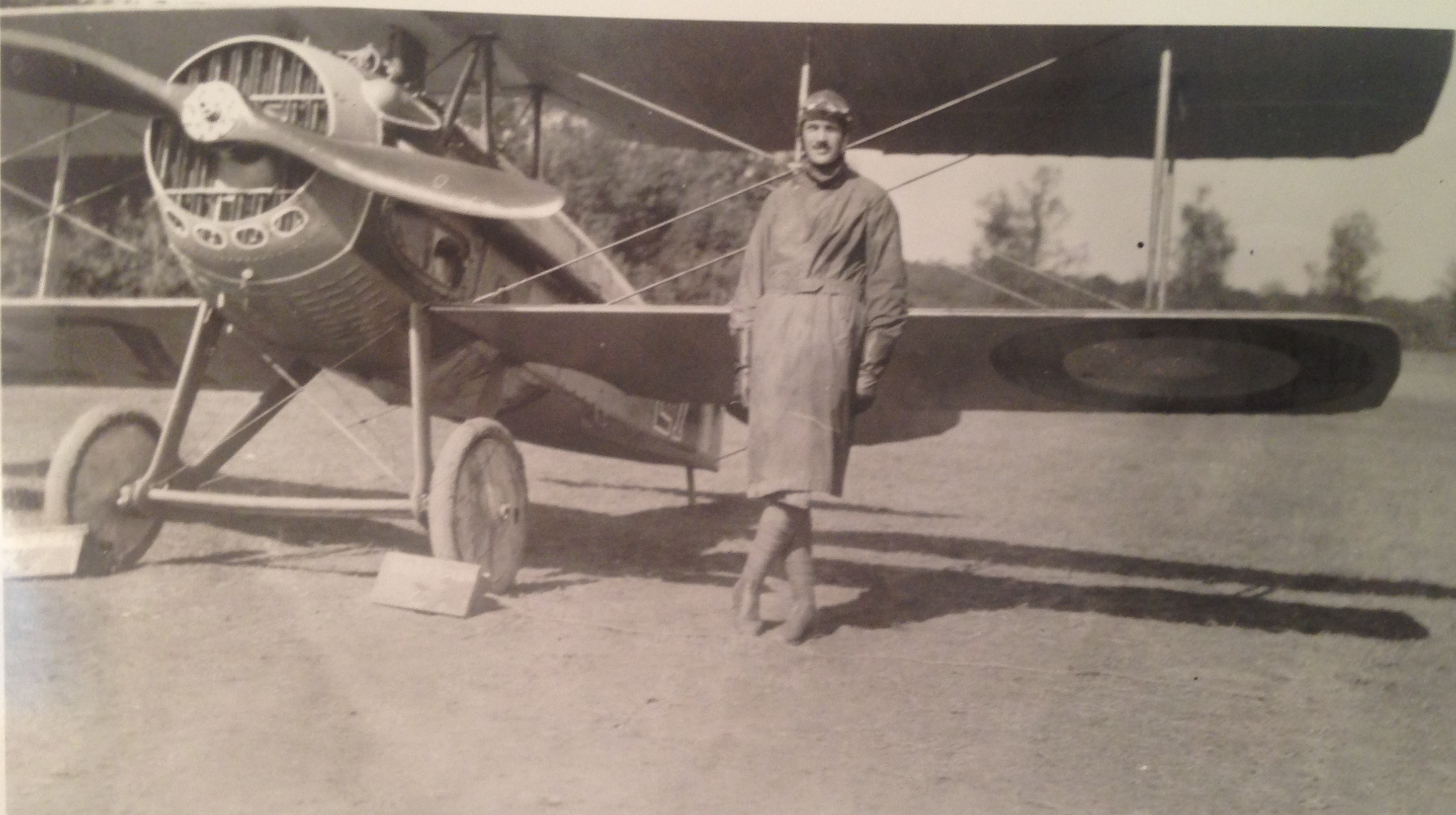
Lt Charles G. Grey next to his Spad XIII

Arriving at Vaucouleurs on 26 July, the squadron was initially assigned SPAD VII aircraft, being flown down from the Air Service Acceptance Park No. 1 at Orly Field, near Paris. On 14 August 1918, the first patrol was carried out by Lieutenants Ford, Weirick and Matheson. They flew a patrol from Vaucouleurs to Nomey, Pont a Mosson, Xivry, Vigreulles and then returned to Vaucouleurs. The next day an escort patrol was sent out to accompany a flight of 96th Squadron Breguet bombers, however the aircraft failed to appear and the squadron's planes returned. Later that day, another escort mission for the 91st Squadron Salmson reconnaissance planes were flown over the route Pagny-Lake Lachausse-Fresnes-Vegnuille.

The first squadron member to engage an enemy aircraft happened on 21 July when Lieutenant Ford attacked a biplane enemy plane around Beaumont. The enemy plane began to spin in a steep dive, and was seen to hit the ground, but no ground infantry was in the area to confirm the combat. During the seventeen days of August, the squadron carried out 26 patrols, 192 sorties and had three combat aerial victories, all of which were unconfirmed.

On 12 September, a low strafing mission with all squadron pilots was carried out. Lt. Gray leading a patrol over enemy lines on the 15th shot an enemy balloon down in flames, and Lieutenant Hambleton shooting down an enemy aircraft near Chambley. A special mission was carried on 29 September to machine-gun roads and enemy concentrations in the vicinity of Geses. The squadron caused considerable confusion with the enemy infantry.

As the First Army began taking the offensive at Saint-Mihiel and also in the Meuse-Argonne offensives, the 213th was busy in the air. With the Meuse-Argonne offensive starting on 26 September, more bomber escort missions were undertaken though the end of the month. Combat missions were undertaken throughout October supporting the offensive with bombing and escort missions over enemy territory in support of First Army.

On 26 September First Army began its great offensive near Verdun, and in response the German Air Service responded, very much reinforced. The squadron saw enemy aircraft patrolling and escorting reconnaissance planes in the region of Etain, and the patrol had a narrow escape. During the offensive, squadron pilots inflicted heavy losses upon enemy aircraft and balloons. As its pilots gained domination of the air, their responsibilities were expanded to include protection of ground forces, strafing of enemy troops and bombing of targets that could be observed within enemy lines.

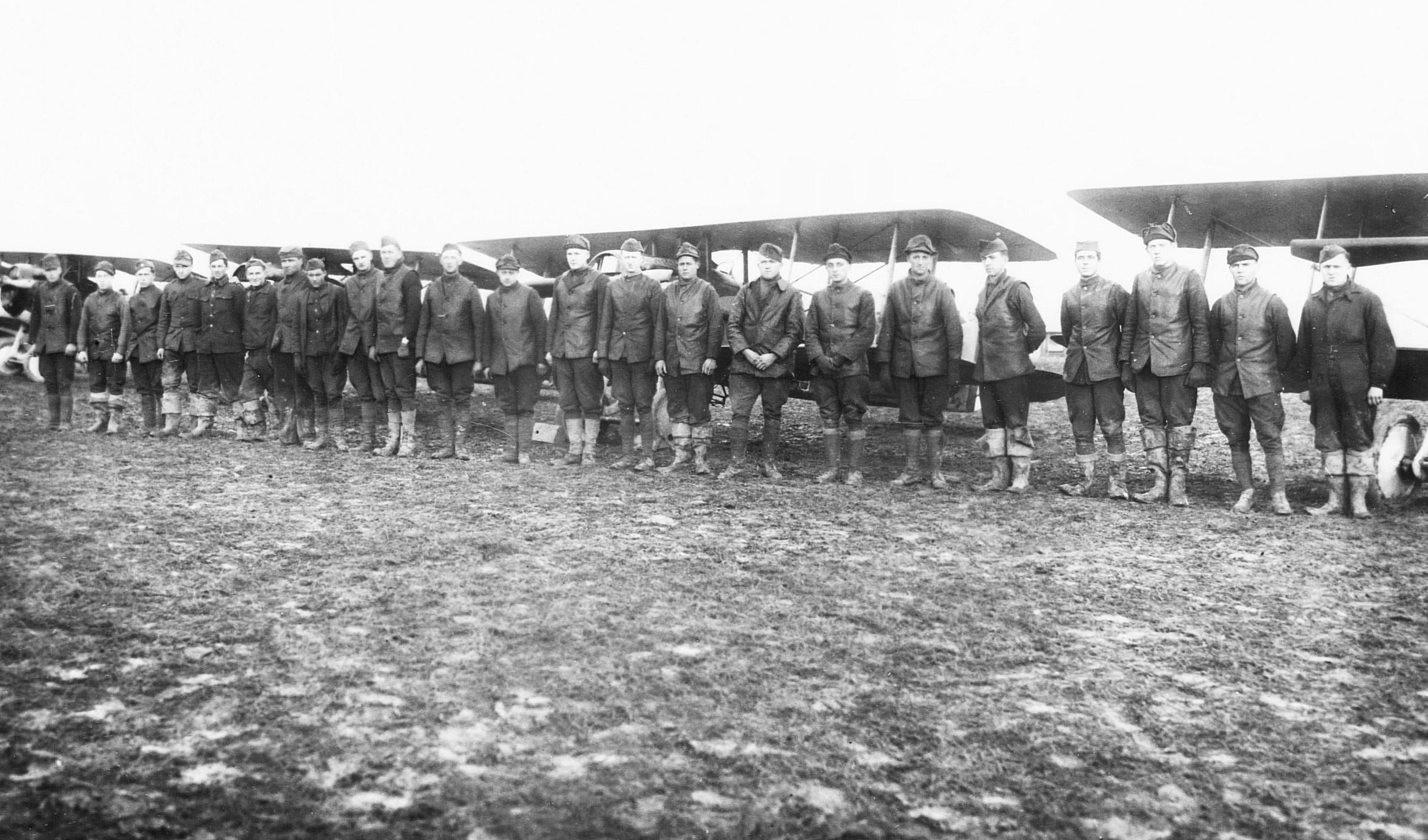
Men and aircraft of the 213th Aero Squadron, Foucaucourt Aerodrome, France, November 1918.

On 1 October a patrol of six squadron planes saw enemy biplanes in the vicinity of Bantheville, however only Lt. Cone was able to shoot one down in the region of Brieulles. The squadron daily engaged in combats while escorting bomber and observation planes. Because of bad weather, very few patrols were made between 10 and 18 October, the clouds hung very low, the mist was thick and at times there was a great deal of drizzly rain. However, on the 18th the squadron was able to fly a protection mission for the 1st Day Bombardment Group.

The squadron moved on 5 November to Foucaucourt Aerodrome, however weather conditions limited its operations to below the clouds and to attacks on enemy infantry forces on the ground. These low-level attacks attacked enemy infantry forces along the sides of the roads east of the Meuse. A rumor of an armistice was constantly being discussed and it was felt that these were the last chances to speed up the agreement by attacking the enemy as much as possible.

The squadron was told that the war would be over on 10 November, and that all offensive patrols would cease at 11:00am the next day. The morning of the 11th saw bad weather and all combat ended that day.

=== Demobilization ===
The AEF was very slow in returning its forces to the United States. The squadron remained at Foucaucourt Airdrome until 29 January 1919 when it was ordered to report to the 1st Air Depot, Colombey-les-Belles Airdrome to turn in all of its supplies and equipment and was relieved from duty with the AEF. The squadron's SPAD aircraft were delivered to the Air Service American Air Service Acceptance Park No. 1 at Orly Aerodrome to be returned to the French. There practically all of the pilots and observers were detached from the squadron.

Personnel at Colombey were subsequently assigned to the commanding general, services of supply, and ordered to report to the staging camp at Le Mans France. There, personnel awaited scheduling to report to one of the base ports in France for transport to the United States. It was moved to its port of embarkation, Brest on 22 May 1919.

The 213th Aero Squadron (Pursuit), returned to New York City on 10 June, its personnel were demobilized and returned to civilian life, the squadron inactivated at Hazelhurst Field, Long Island, on 30 June 1919.

=== Lineage ===
- Organized as 213th Aero Squadron, 1 December 1917

Re-designated, 213th Aero Squadron (Pursuit), 23 July 1918
Demobilized on 30 June 1919.

=== Assignments ===
- Post Headquarters, Kelly Field, 1 December 1917
- Aviation Concentration Center, 7 January 1918
- Air Service Headquarters, AEF, British Isles

Attached to: Royal Flying Corps for training, 20 February-28 June 1918

- 3d Air Instruction Center, 23 July 1918
- 3d Pursuit Group, 26 July 1918
- 1st Air Depot, 29 January 1919
- Commanding General, Services of Supply, February–May 1919
- Eastern Department, 10–30 June 1919

=== Stations ===
- Kelly Field, Texas, 1 December 1917
- Aviation Concentration Center, Garden City, New York, 7 January 1918
- Port of Entry, Hoboken, New Jersey

Overseas transport: RMS Tuscania, 24 January – 5 February 1918 (Ship torpedoed)

- Unit re-assembled at Winchester, England, February 1918
- RFC Ayre, Scotland, 20 February 1918
- Winchester, England, 15 June 1918
- Saint Maixent (?), 29 June – 23 July 1918
- Issoudun Aerodrome, 23 July 1918
- Vaucouleurs Aerodrome, 26 July 1918
- Lisle-en-Barrois Aerodrome, France, 20 September 1918
- Foucaucourt Aerodrome, France, 6 November 1918
- Colombey-les-Belles Airdrome, 29 January 1919
- Undetermined location in France, February–May 1919
- Brest, France, 22 May 1919
- Hazelhurst Field, New York, 11–30 June 1919

=== Combat sectors and campaigns ===
Streamer	Sector/Campaign	Dates	Notes
	Toul Sector	27 July – 11 September 1918	
	St. Mihiel Offensive Campaign	12–16 September 1918	
	Meuse-Argonne Offensive Campaign	26 September – 11 November 1918	

=== Notable personnel ===
- Lt. Richard T. Aldworth (MIA)
- Lt. Clarence M. Bellows (KIA)
- Cpt. Charles G. Grey, DSC, air ace
- Lt. Patrick H. Mell, DSC, SSC, 2 aerial victories
- Lt. John A. Hambleton, SSC
- Lt. David E. McClure (KIA)
- Lt. John W. Odgen (MIA)
- Lt. Richard Phelan (MIA) {died 31 October 1918. ABMC Record}
- Lt. Frank W. Sidler (MIA) {died 13 Sep 1918. ABMC Record}
- Lt. Alvin M. Treadwell (MIA)
- Lt. Arthur W. Weirick (MIA)

DSC: Distinguished Service Cross; SSC: Silver Star Citation; KIA: Killed in Action; MIA: Missing in Action

== See also ==
- Organization of the Air Service of the American Expeditionary Force
- List of American aero squadrons
