= Foucaucourt Aerodrome =

World War I airfield in Lorraine, France

- Part of American Expeditionary Forces (AEF)
- Located near: Foucaucourt-sur-Thabas, France
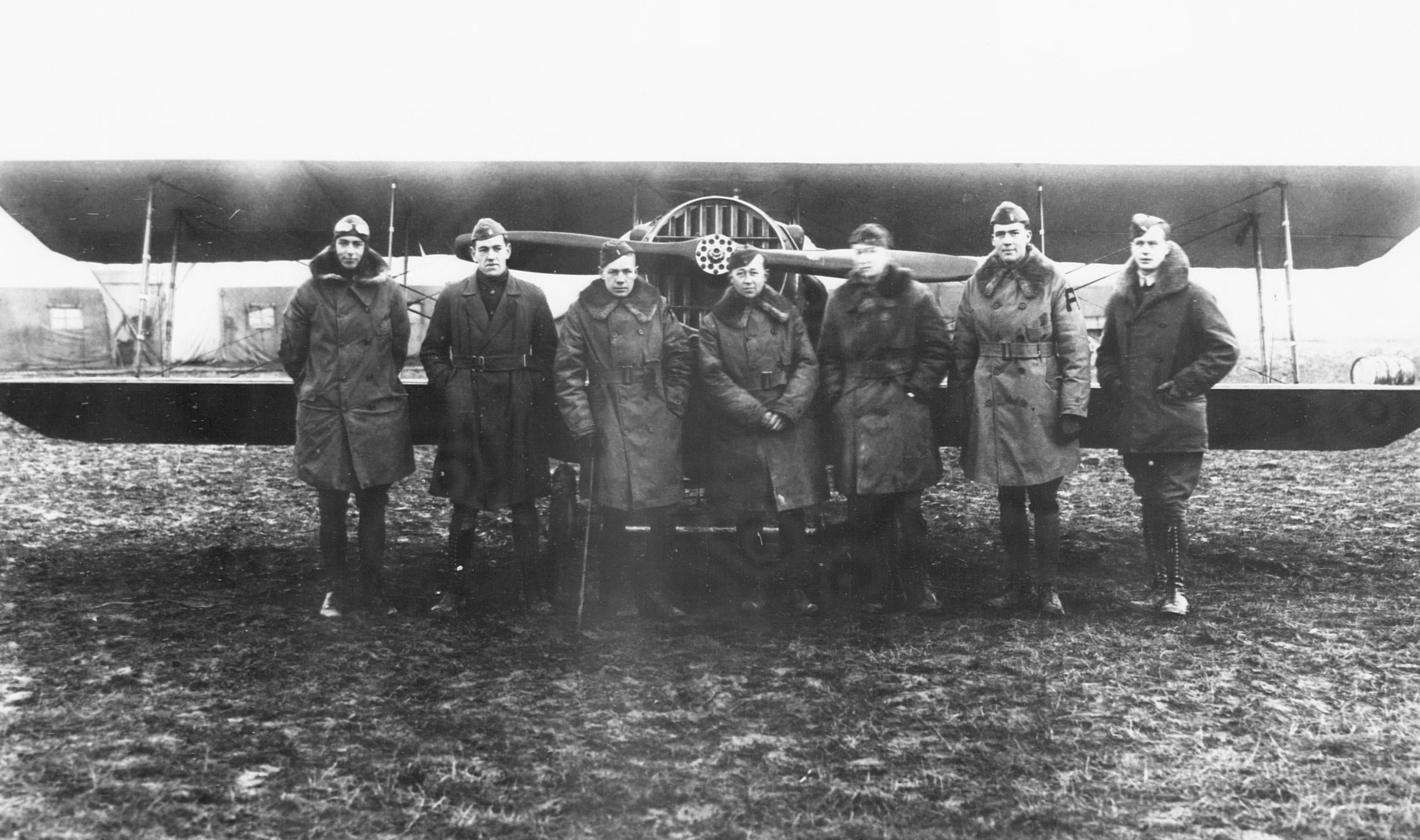
- SPAD XIII of the 213th Aero Squadron at Foucaucourt Aerodrome

Site information
- Type: Combat Airfield
- Controlled by: Air Service, United States Army
- Condition: Agricultural area

Location
- Coordinates: 48°59′45″N 05°07′17″E

Site history
- Built: 1918
- In use: 1918–1919
- Battles/wars: World War I

Garrison information
- Garrison: V Corps Observation Group; 3d Pursuit Group; United States First Army Air Service

Foucaucourt Aerodrome was a temporary World War I airfield in France, used both by French units, and squadrons of the Air Service, United States Army. It was located 4.3 miles (6.9 km) ESE of Foucaucourt-sur-Thabas, in Meuse, a department in Lorraine in north-eastern France.

== Overview ==
The airfield was first built by the French in the summer of 1917. (Note: This has to be confirmed, as the first French units arrived in March 1918) The French escadrilles left in September 1918, giving way to the American V Corps Observation Group and its two squadrons:

- 99th Aero Squadron 20 September 1918 – 4 November 1918
- 104th Aero Squadron 20 September 1918 – 4 November 1918

Arriving at the same time, a detachment from 462nd Aero Squadron (Construction) stayed until 6 October to improve some parts of the airfield's organization. Over a total surface of 89 acres, the Air Service engineers constructed 12 wooden barracks and a mess hall, as well as 5 buildings to be used as warehouses and maintenance shops. A station administration building and a hospital clinic was constructed along with an electrical and a telephone grid. The airfield had four French "Bessonneau" aircraft hangars erected.

The observation group provided battlefield reconnaissance and artillery cooperation for the V Corps. Operations from Foucaucourt initially were preparations to help the V Corps in the Meuse-Argonne offensive. German soldiers opposed the attack from barbed-wire-protected trenches. Also, additional enemy pursuit, observation and bombardment forces meant most of the Kaiser's best aviation units defended the area.

When the ground attack began on 26 September, inclement weather restricted flight operations. Since cloud cover severely limited photographic reconnaissance, headquarters confined missions to a few, well-defined and extremely important areas. Aircraft and pilots often stood ready to fly, waiting in vain for any break in the clouds. When weather permitted, crews took oblique photographs along enemy lines. If the need for information was great, pilots flew even in heavy cloud cover hoping for a chance break to take that important picture.

In early November, the two squadrons of the V Corps Observation Group moved up to Parois Airdrome, but the HQ stayed in Foucaucourt until 4 February 1919, soon to be disbanded.

The observation squadrons gave way to the 3d Pursuit Group, which moved into Foucaucout from Lisle-en-Barrois Aerodrome with its headquarter and four SPAD XIII pursuit squadrons on 6 November, part of the 1st Pursuit Wing working for the US First Army:

- 28th Aero Squadron 6 November 1918 – 11 December 1918
- 93rd Aero Squadron 6 November 1918 – 15 December 1918
- 103rd Aero Squadron 6 November 1918 – 5 January 1919
- 213th Aero Squadron 5 November 1918 – 29 January 1919

The pursuit squadrons were hampered by the bad weather, and concentrated their operations to low-level attacks on enemy infantry forces along the roads east of the River Meuse until the Armistice on 11 November.

After the Armistice was signed, the group's squadrons continued flying training sorties from Foucaucourt. The 3rd Pursuit Group was disbanded on 31 December 1918, the 93rd having already left. The last squadron - 28th - was ordered to report to the 1st Air Depot at Colombey-les-Belles Aerodrome to demobilize in mid February 1919. Foucaucourt was then turned over to the 1st Air Depot for de-construction. All hangars and other structures were dismantled and all useful supplies and equipment were removed and sent back to the Depot for storage. Upon completion, the land turned over to the French government.

== See also ==
- List of Air Service American Expeditionary Force aerodromes in France
