= 3rd Pursuit Group =

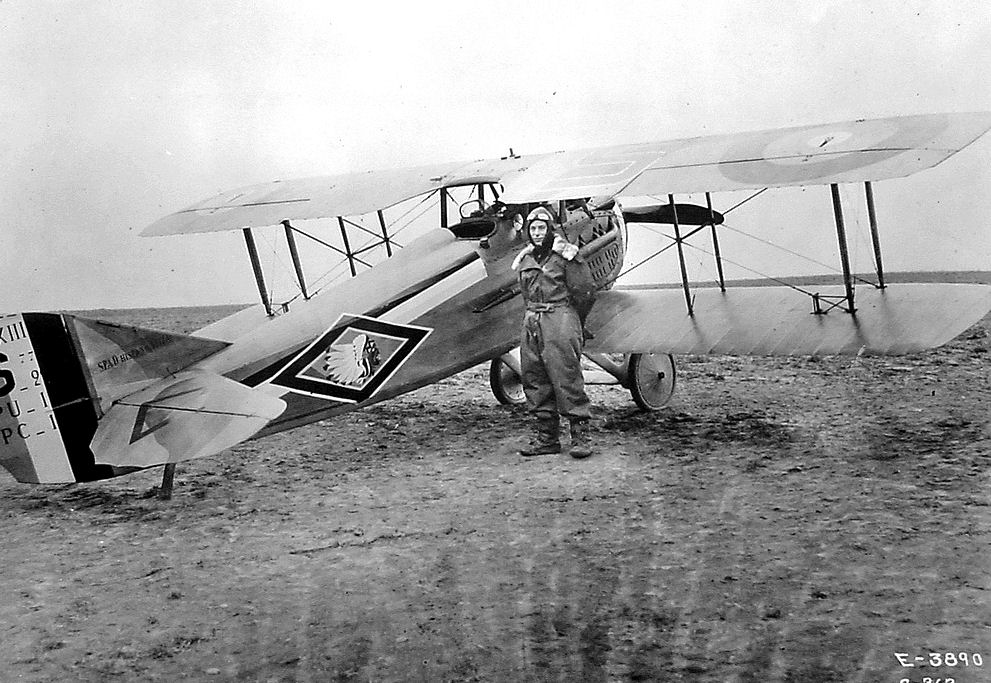
- 103rd Aero Squadron – SPAD Spad XIII C.1 of Capt. Robert Soubiran, 103rd Aero Squadron, Serial # S7714.
- Active: 1918–19
- Country: United States
- Branch: United States Army Air Service
- Type: Group
- Role: Command and Control
- Part of: American Expeditionary Forces (AEF)
- Engagements: World War I: St. Mihiel Offensive Campaign; Meuse-Argonne Offensive Campaign

Insignia
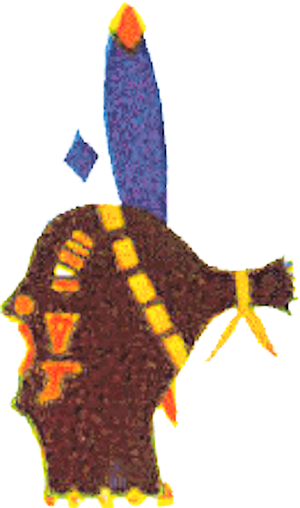
- 28th Aero Squadron Emblem

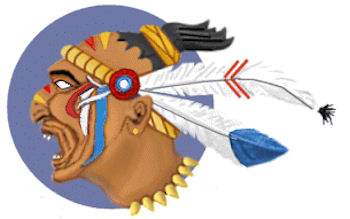
- 93rd Aero Squadron Emblem

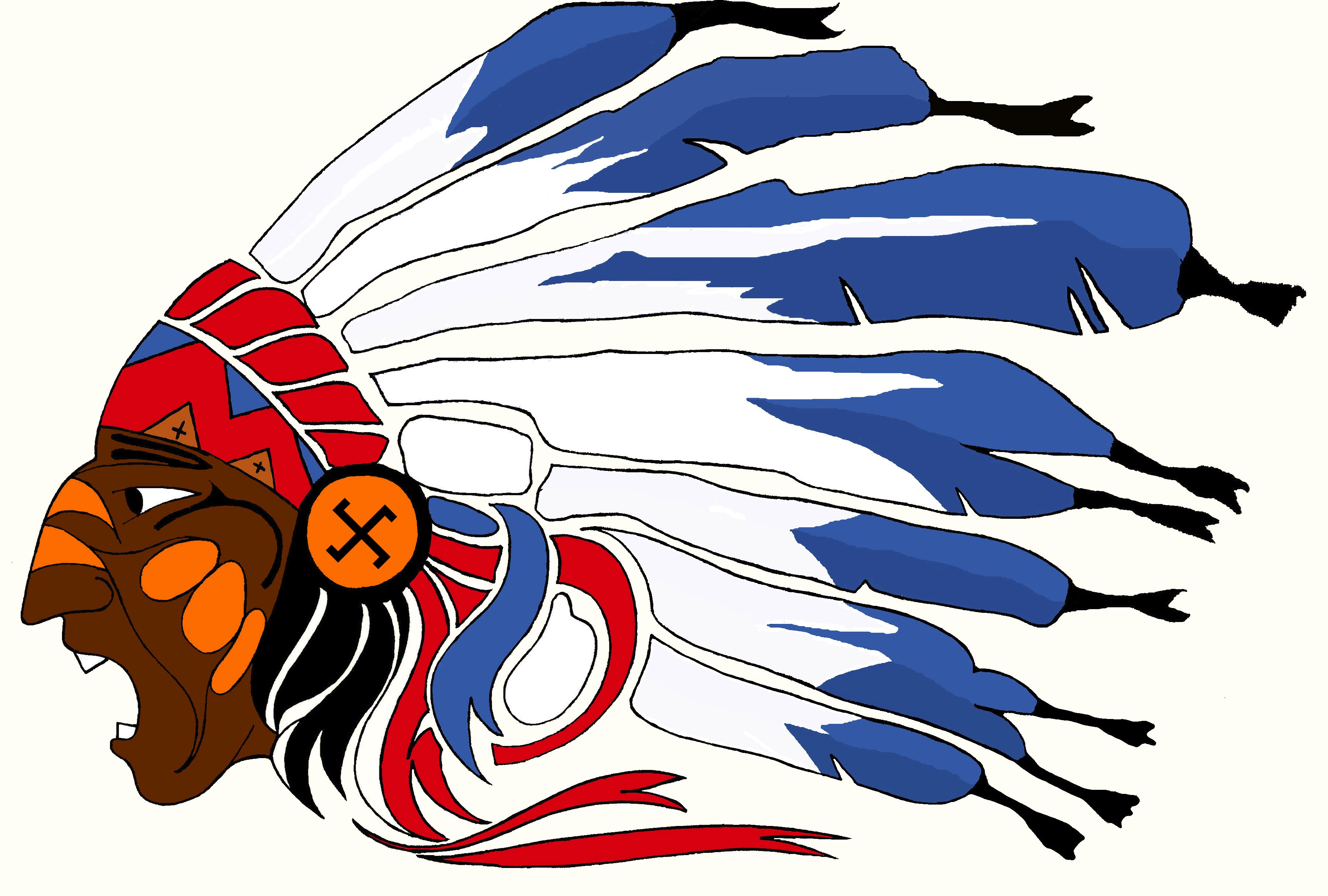
- 103rd Aero Squadron Emblem

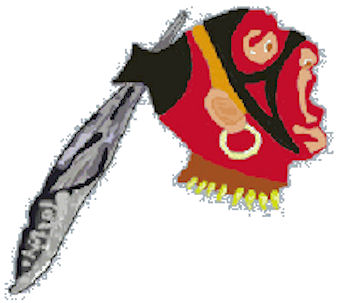
- 213th Aero Squadron Emblem

The 3rd Pursuit Group was a United States Army Air Service unit that fought on the Western Front during World War I as part of the First United States Army. Formed in France in July 1918, the group was assigned to the 1st Pursuit Wing and saw action in the final months of the war, supporting the Battle of Saint-Mihiel and the Meuse-Argonne Offensive. Following the end of the war, the group was demobilized in France in late December 1918. There is no modern United States Air Force unit that shares its lineage and history.

== History ==
The group was formed on 30 July 1918 (create 26 July) when the command staff for the group was organized at Vaucouleurs Aerodrome, France. Operations began on 7 August when two patrols were made over enemy lines by the 103rd Aero Squadron. By 21 August, four pursuit squadrons, all flying SPAD XIII aircraft had been formed and equipped. The insignia of the 3rd Pursuit Group consisted of an Indian Head, with each squadron being identified by the number of feathers. Group aircraft markings were:

- 28th AS: Indian Head, 1 blue feather. Aircraft tail stripes were large red, small green stripes, alternating.
- 93rd AS: Indian Head, 2 red outline feathers. Aircraft tail strips were small red, large green stripes, alternating.
- 103rd AS: Indian Head, 5 black/yellow feathers. Aircraft tail stripes were large red and green stripes, alternating.
- 213th AS: Indian Head 2 red feathers. Aircraft tail stripes were small green, large red stripes, alternating.

The 103rd AS was already famous, using the USAS version of Spa.124 as the Lafayette Escadrille.

=== Saint-Mihiel ===
During the Battle of Saint-Mihiel, in co-operation with the 2nd Pursuit Group, patrols operating at medium and high altitudes were maintained. During the opening days of the battle, the group operated just within enemy lines, and later as the day of the attack drew near, well back within Allied lines. The purpose of these patrols was to prevent German observation planes from making reconnaissance flights over Allied territory and conceal the strength of ground forces as well as Allied air power. At the same time, in anticipation of using large formations during the attack, frequent practice patrols were made, consisting of all available planes in two squadrons flying in one formation. These were made well behind the lines, unobserved by the Germans.

Offensive operations began on 12 September with all available planes of the group flying over the lines at a very low altitude, machine-gunning and attacking enemy troop concentrations, never exceeding 300 meters (980 ft) in altitude. The group's aircraft attacked railroad yards, road convoys, and troops both on roads and in towns, playing havoc with the enemy. The next day, the squadrons pressed home similar attacks as well as flying advanced reconnaissance patrols near the Mad River and in the region between Conflans-sur-Seine, Mare la Tour and Chambley. Many German Fokkers were encountered and a large number of combat actions ensured. Seven confirmed enemy aircraft were brought down. On the last day of the attack, 14 September, large numbers of enemy aircraft were engaged in combat throughout the day. Allied aircraft were successful in keeping the skies clear for observation aircraft to photograph and to mark enemy positions.

After the Saint-Mihiel attacks, the group settled down to a routine schedule of defensive patrols over the line, carrying out bombing raids when weather permitted. By 18 September, preparations were well under way for the planned Meuse-Argonne Offensive. On 20/21 September the group moved to the Lisle-en-Barrois Aerodrome, closer to the front; however, its patrols remained flying their previous sector, not to betray the planning for the upcoming offensive.

=== Meuse-Argonne Offensive ===
On 26 September, the US First Army attacked on a new front, extending from the Argonne Forest to the Meuse River. The squadrons engaged in constant sorties, bombing and machine gunning enemy forces in front of the infantry troops attacking. Many enemy aircraft were engaged, although the Germans were completely dominated by Allied air power. Sorties were flown in conjunction with the 1st Day Bombardment Group, with the 3rd Pursuit Group flying escort missions for the bombers. A running air battle ensured in the general region of Montfaucon-d'Argonne, with four enemy aircraft shot down.

By the afternoon of 6 October, two squadrons carried out a bombing and strafing attack on Brieulles-sur-Meuse, dropping a total of 220 kg of bombs on enemy troops and convoys. During the attack, aircraft from the group were attacked by eleven Fokkers; however, the attack was carried out without loss. Bad weather and heavy rain began shortly after that, making flying difficult and often impossible. On 18 October, the largest demonstration of American air power was made when two squadrons of the 2nd Pursuit Group, flying at very low altitude; two squadrons of the 3rd Pursuit Group, operating at 2,500 meters (8,200 ft); four squadrons of the 1st Day Bombardment Group at 4,000 meters (13,000 ft) and two more squadrons of the 3rd PG acting as escort for the bombers all rendezvoused in a raid over Bayonville. In addition to destroying enemy ground targets, over forty enemy aircraft were shot down in combat.

Throughout the entire campaign the group carried out bombing raids and strafing of infantry to harass and disrupt the enemy's retreat, and these continued until the end of hostilities. On 6 November the group moved to Foucaucourt Aerodrome, France to be closer to the advancing line. The last patrol over enemy lines was made in the late afternoon of 10 November. Although hampered by a heavy ground mist, low clouds and intermittent rain, 930 kg of bombs were dropped on various enemy targets on the very last day of the war.

=== Lineage ===
- Organized in France as: 3rd Pursuit Group on 30 July 1918

Demobilized in France in December 1918

=== Assignments ===
- 1st Pursuit Wing, 26 July 1918 – 17 December 1918

=== Components ===
- 28th Aero Squadron, 22 August – 6 November 1918
- 49th Aero Squadron, 28 July – 2 August 1918
- 93rd Aero Squadron, 26 July – 15 December 1918
- 103rd Aero Squadron, 7 August – 31 December 1918
- 213th Aero Squadron, 26 July – 31 December 1918

=== Stations ===
- Vaucouleurs Aerodrome, France, 30 July – 20 September 1918
- Lisle-en-Barrois Aerodrome, France, 20 September – 6 November 1918
- Foucaucourt Aerodrome, France, 11 November 1918 – December 1918

== See also ==
- Organization of the Air Service of the American Expeditionary Force
