= Lisle-en-Barrois Aerodrome =

- Part of American Expeditionary Forces (AEF)
- Located near: Lisle-en-Barrois, France
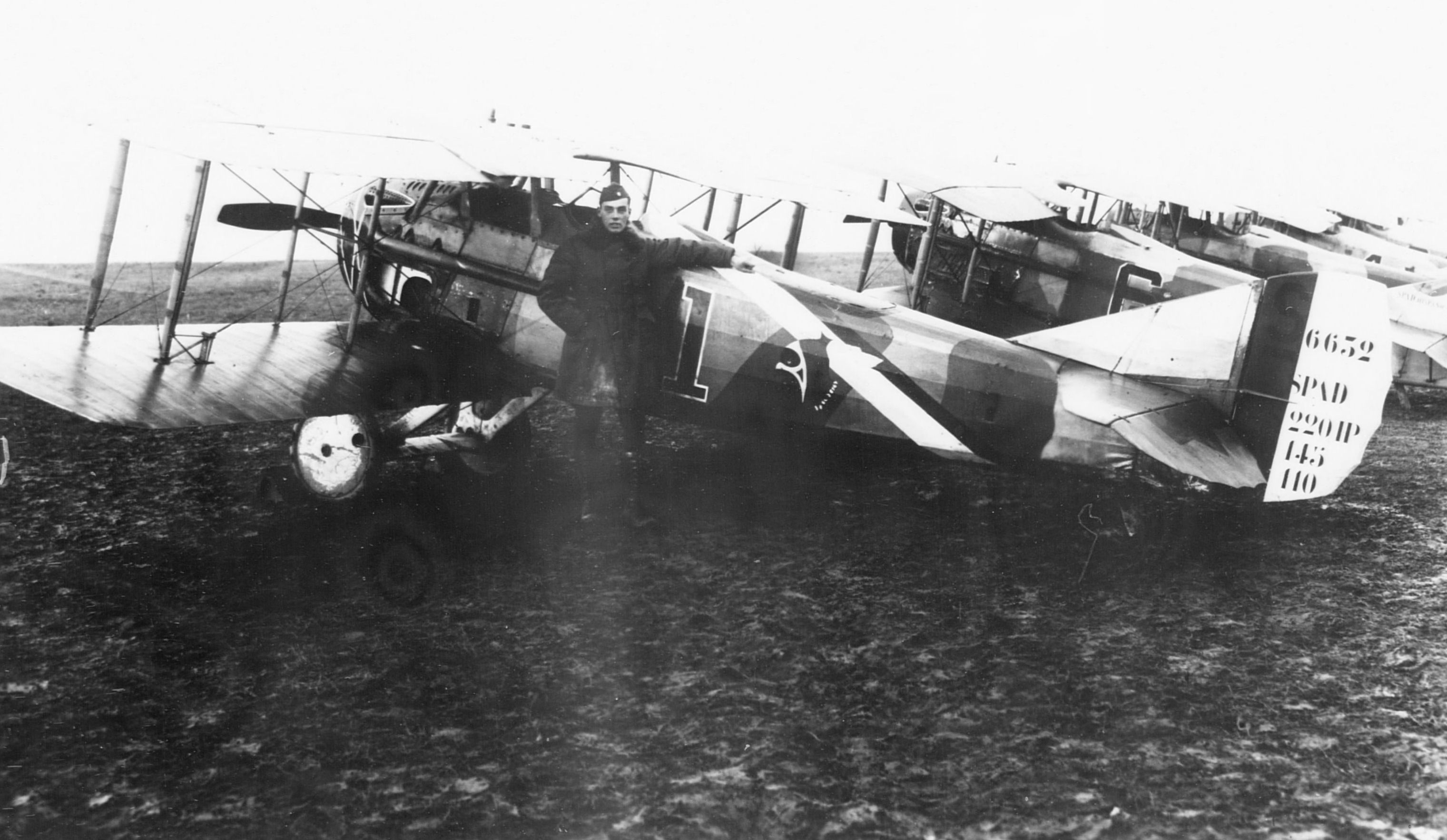
- Captain John A. Hambleton, 213th Aero Squadron with his SPAD XIII, Lisle-en-Barrois Aerodromem France. Hambleton was credited with three aerial victories in World War I and awarded two Distinguished Service Crosses.

Site information
- Type: Combat airfield
- Controlled by: Air Service, United States Army
- Condition: Agricultural area

Location
- Coordinates: 48°54′05″N 005°08′11″E

Site history
- Built: 1918
- In use: 1918–1919
- Battles/wars: World War I

Garrison information
- Garrison: 3d Pursuit Group; United States First Army Air Service

Lisle-en-Barrois Aerodrome was a temporary World War I airfield in France, used by the French Air Service from 1915, and later by the Air Service, United States Army. It was located on the plateau north of the commune of Lisle-en-Barrois, approximately 17 km (11 miles) north of Bar-le-Duc, in the Meuse department in north-eastern France.

== Overview ==
In 1915, the French escadrille MS 37 stayed from 19 August to 16 October near the "ferme de Vaudoncourt", 1 mile north of lisle en Barrois.

A new airfield was built during summer 1918, initially for the French Air Service: Groupe de Combat 12 and its four escadrilles, SPA 3, SPA 26, SPA 67 and SPA 103 stayed from 9 to 19 September. As no other French unit is known to have stayed later, it can be assumed that the airfield was transferred to the Air Service, United States Army in the following days.

3d Pursuit Group headquarters arrived on 20 September 1918 with four squadrons (28th, 93rd, 103rd and 213th Aero Squadrons), flying missions for the US First Army during both the St. Mihiel and Meuse-Argonne Offensives. In support of the flying squadrons, the 2d Air Park had a flight of mechanics for repair of both aircraft and vehicles.

462nd Aero Squadron (construct.) arrived at the same time to improve the airfield installations, leaving on 6 October towards Parois Aerodrome, near Clermont en Argonne.

By 6 November, with the front moving to the west and north, the 3d Pursuit Group moved up to Foucaucourt Aerodrome, and Lisle-en-Barrois airfield was abandoned.

After the armistice, the airfield was returned to agricultural use. Today it is a series of cultivated fields located on the east side of the Départmental 2 (D2), north of Lisle-en-Barrois, with no indications of its wartime use.

== Known units assigned ==
- Headquarters, 3d Pursuit Group, 20 September – 6 November 1918
- 28th Aero Squadron (Pursuit), 20 September – 6 November 1918
- 103d Aero Squadron (Pursuit), 20 September – 6 November 1918
- 93d Aero Squadron (Pursuit), 21 September – 6 November 1918
- 213th Aero Squadron (Pursuit), 20 September – 5 November 1918

== See also ==
- List of Air Service American Expeditionary Force aerodromes in France
