= 49th Aero Squadron =

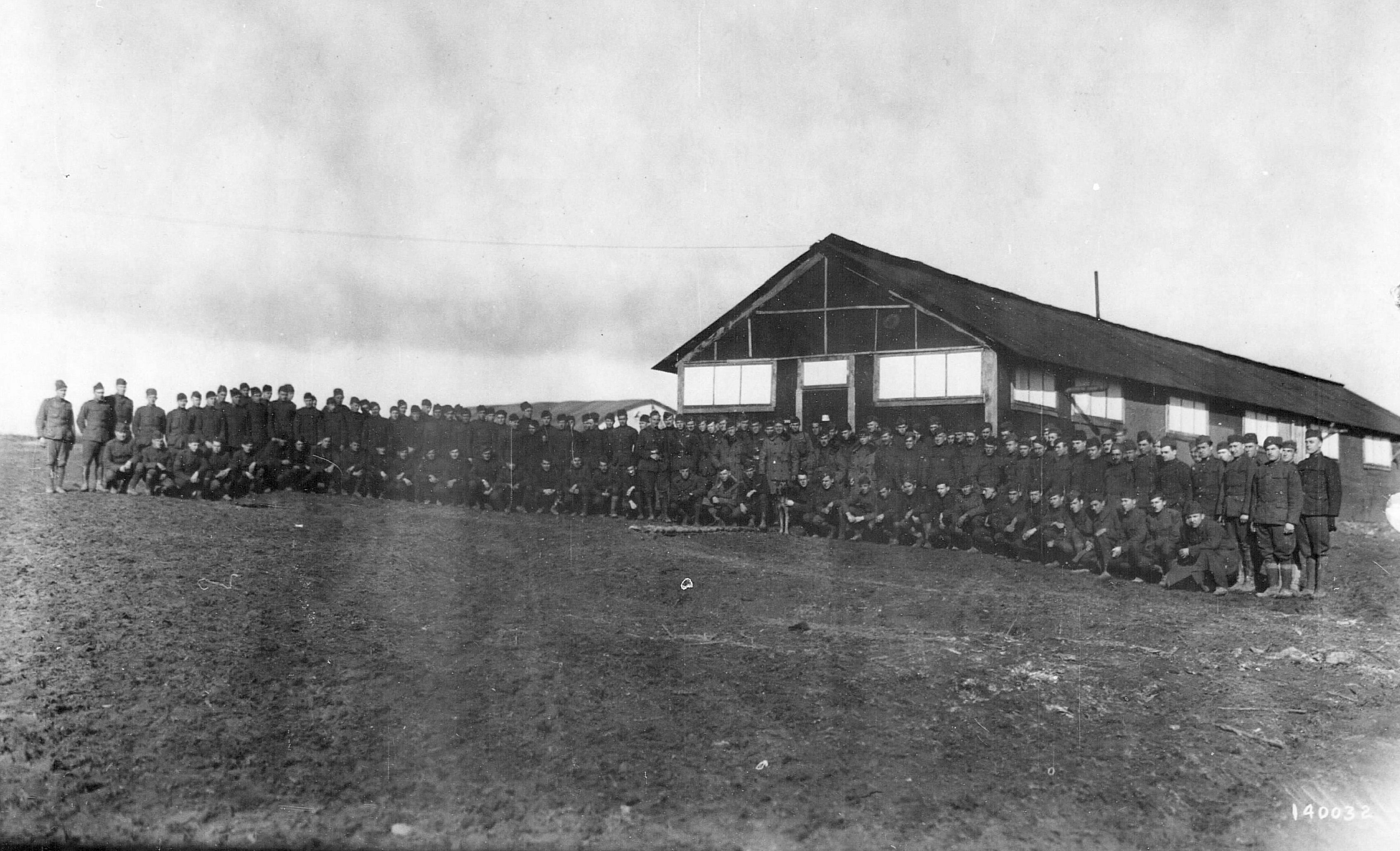
- Men (and mascot dog) of the 49th Aero Squadron, Souilly Aerodrome, France, November 1918
- Active: 6 August 1917 – 22 March 1919
- Country: United States
- Branch: United States Army Air Service
- Type: Squadron
- Part of: American Expeditionary Forces (AEF)
- Fuselage Code: "Snarling Wolf"
- Engagements: World War I

Commanders
- Notable commanders: Lt. George F. Fisher

Insignia
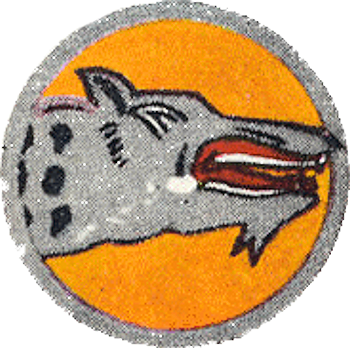
- 49th Aero Squadron Emblem

Aircraft flown
- Fighter: SPAD S.XIII, 1918
- Trainer: Curtiss JN-4, 1917

Service record
- Operations: 2d Pursuit Group; Western Front, France: 14 August-11 November 1918
- Victories: Enemy Aircraft shot down: 24; Enemy Balloons shot down: 0; Total Enemy Aircraft Destroyed: 24; Air Aces: 0 Notable pilots: Lt David H. Backus (4 victories); Lt Hugh L. Fontaine (4 victories); Lt James F. Manning (4 victories)

The 49th Aero Squadron was a United States Army Air Service unit that fought on the Western Front during World War I.

The squadron was assigned as a Day Pursuit (Fighter) Squadron as part of the 2d Pursuit Group, First United States Army. Its mission was to engage and clear enemy aircraft from the skies and provide escort to reconnaissance and bombardment squadrons over enemy territory. It also attacked enemy observation balloons, and performed close air support and tactical bombing attacks on enemy forces along the front lines. After the 1918 Armistice with Germany, the squadron returned to the United States in March 1919 and was demobilized.

On 16 October 1936, the World War I Aero squadron was consolidated with the United States Army Air Corps 49th Bombardment Squadron to preserve the lineage and history of the unit. Today, the United States Air Force 49th Test and Evaluation Squadron performs flight testing at Barksdale Air Force Base, Louisiana.

== History ==
=== Organization and training ===
Formed at Kelly Field No. 1, San Antonio, Texas on 6 August 1917. During its initial indoctrination training at Kelly Field, many squadron members were reassigned to other squadrons, however on 25 August, personnel from the 68th Aero Squadron were assigned to the 49th. After about a month of basic training as soldiers, the squadron was moved to the newly opened Kelly Field No. 2 where they began training with Curtiss JN-4 Jennys as a school squadron.

On 16 November, training ended and the squadron moved back to Kelly Field No. 1 to await orders for overseas deployment. On 21 November, an additional 65 men were assigned to the 49th Squadron, and the unit entrained in San Antonio bound for Garden City, Long Island, New York.

The squadron arrived in New York on 3 January 1918. Several weeks were spent at the Aviation Concentration Center, sailing for Liverpool, England on 9 January, arriving on 23 January. The squadron disembarked the ship the next day and marched to the Liverpool railway station where a train took them to Winchester, Hampshire, on the south coast of England. Winchester was reached that evening and the squadron detrained and marched to the Romsey Rest Camp where the squadron remained for a week. On 31 January, the 49th Squadron was divided up into separate flights for training by the Royal Flying Corps in England. Flight "A" and "D" were assigned to the Castle Bromwich Aerodrome, Birmingham; Flight "B" was assigned to Bicester Aerodrome, Oxford, and "C" flight to Rendcomb Aerodrome, Cirencester. The flight officers wee ordered to the Third Air Instructional Center, Issoudun Aerodrome, France for combat training.

The squadron was re-assembled at Castle Bromwich Aerodrome on 5 April, and additional training was received until 24 June. From there the squadron departed for France, arriving at Issoudun for additional training on French aircraft. Several weeks were spent there before being assigned to the 3d Pursuit Group and transferring to Vaucouleurs Aerodrome. There the squadron received French SPAD XIII pursuit planes, then being transferred again to Gengault Aerodrome, Toul where the squadron was reassigned to the 2d Pursuit Group.

=== Combat Operations ===
Combat patrols began on 18 August when at 06:15 three aircraft took off from Toul. Two of the aircraft had engine problems and were forced to return, leaving Lt Buford alone. At 07:30 he encountered a German Rumpler biplane at 5,000 meters. Lt Buford engaged the enemy aircraft got on the tail of the Rumpler and fired a long machine-gun burst. The Rumpler caught fire and he saw the plane go into a straight nose dive.

On 23 September, the squadron moved to Belrain Aerodrome near Bar-le-Duc. On 4 October, a patrol of seven aircraft encountered a formation of six Fokkers in the region of Doulcon. Turning, several aircraft of the squadron moved into position to attack, while the remainder remained above. During the course of the combat, several other Fokkers attacked the high flight of the squadron. During the course of the combat, eleven enemy aircraft were seen to go down, the remaining aircraft turning back. One squadron pilot was lost in the battle and another squadron plane was damaged and had to make a forced landing on the friendly side of the lines after receiving several enemy bullets in his engine.

Four of the 49th squadron planes encountered four enemy aircraft during a patrol on 10 October. The squadron attacked the enemy aircraft, seeing one begin to burn and falling in a straight nose dive and crashing to the ground. During the battle one of the squadron's SPAD's lost a wing and begin to fall, being followed down by a Fokker. The enemy aircraft was attacked and driven off. The last Fokker was attacked and it burst into flames, seeing it dive to the ground out of control.

The last combat patrol was flown on 23 October when a formation of four squadron aircraft on patrol encountered four Fokkers. Attacking out of the sun and from above, the 49th Squadron shot down all four enemy aircraft without loss. On 6 November the squadron moved to Souilly Aerodrome, however bad weather led to no combat flying being made before the Armistice on 11 November.

=== Demobilization ===
After the Armistice, members of the squadron began taking leave in France, with the organization standing down, although some cross-country flights were made. On 6 December orders were received from First Army for the squadron to report to the 1st Air Depot, Colombey-les-Belles Airdrome to turn in all of its supplies and equipment and was relieved from duty with the AEF. The squadron's SPAD aircraft were delivered to the Air Service American Air Service Acceptance Park No. 1 at Orly Aerodrome to be returned to the French. There practically all of the pilots and observers were detached from the squadron.

Personnel at Colombey were subsequently assigned to the commanding general, services of supply, and ordered to report to one of several staging camps in France. There, personnel waited for scheduling to report to one of the base ports in France for transport to the United States and subsequent demobilization. Finally, in March, the squadron boarded a ship bound for New York, and upon return to the United States, the men of the 49th Aero Squadron were demobilized and returned to civilian life.

During its time in Combat, the 49th Aero Squadron downed 25 enemy aircraft, losing six pilots killed, wounded, or missing.

=== Lineage ===
- Organized as 49th Aero Squadron, on 6 August 1917

Re-designated: 49th Aero Squadron (Pursuit), July 1918
Demobilized on 22 March 1919

=== Assignments ===
- Post Headquarters, Kelly Field, 6 August-21 November 1917
- Aviation Concentration Center, 3–23 January 1918
- Air Service Headquarters, AEF, British Isles, 23 January 1918

Attached to the Royal Flying Corps for training, 24 January-28 July 1918

- 3d Air Instructional Center, 2–28 July 1918
- 3d Pursuit Group, Air Service, 1st Army, AEF, 28 July-2 August 1918
- 2d Pursuit Group, Air Service, 1st Army, AEF, 2 August-7 December 1918
- 1st Air Depot, AEF, 7 December 1918
- Commanding General, Services of Supply, December 1918 – March 1919
- Eastern Department, March 1919

=== Stations ===
- Kelly Field, Texas, 6 August 1917
- Aviation Concentration Center, Garden City, New York, 3 January 1918
- Port of Entry, Hoboken, New Jersey

Overseas transport: 9–23 January 1918

- Liverpool, England, 24 January 1918
- Winchester, England, 25 January 1918
- RFC Castle Bromwich, England, 31 January-24 June 1918

Flight "A" and "C" detached to: RFC Castle Bromwich, Birmingham, 31 January-5 April 1918
Flight "B" detached to: RFC Bicester, Oxford, 31 January-5 April 1918
Flight "D" detached to: RFC Rendcomb, Cirencester, 31 January-5 April 1918
Squadron reformed at RFC Castle Bromwich, 5 April-24 June 1918

- Issoudun Aerodrome, France, 2–28 July 1918
- Vaucouleurs Aerodrome, France, 28 July 1918 – 2 August 1918
- Croix de Metz Aerodrome, Toul, France, 2 August 1918 – 23 September 1918
- Belrain Aerodrome, France, 23 September 1918 – 7 November 1918
- Souilly Aerodrome, France, 7 November 1918 – December 1918
- Colombey-les-Belles Airdrome, France, December 1918 – Early 1919
- France, Early 1919 – March 1919
- Garden City, New York, March-22 March 1919

=== Combat sectors and campaigns ===
Streamer	Sector/Campaign	Dates	Notes
	Toul Sector	30 June-11 September 1918;17 23 September 1918	
	St. Mihiel Offensive Campaign	12–16 September 1918	
	Meuse-Argonne Offensive Campaign	26 September-11 November 1918	

=== Notable personnel ===
- Lt. David H. Backus, DSC (2x), 4 aerial victories
- Lt. George R. Baxter, SSC
- Lt. Hugh Brewster, DSC, 2 aerial victories
- Lt. Hugh Bridgman, SSC, 1 aerial victory
- Lt. Z. William Colson, SSC
- Cpt. George F. Fisher, DSC, SSC, 1 aerial victory
- Lt. Hugh L. Fontaine, DSC (2x), 4 aerial victories
- Lt. Henry W. Hume, SSC
- Lt. Clair A. Kinney, DSC, 1 aerial victory (KIA)
- Lt. James F. Manning, Jr., DSC, 4 aerial victories
- Lt. James R. McKay, DSC, 1 aerial victory
- Lt. Ora R. McMurry, DSC (2x), 3 aerial victories
- Lt. Lewis C. Plush, DSC, 2 aerial victories
- Lt. Alexander P. Schenck, DSC, 3 aerial victories
- Lt. Charles H. Woolley, SSC

DSC: Distinguished Service Cross; SSC: Silver Star Citation; KIA: Killed in Action

== See also ==
- List of American aero squadrons
- Organization of the Air Service of the American Expeditionary Force
