= 93rd Aero Squadron =

93d Aero Squadron
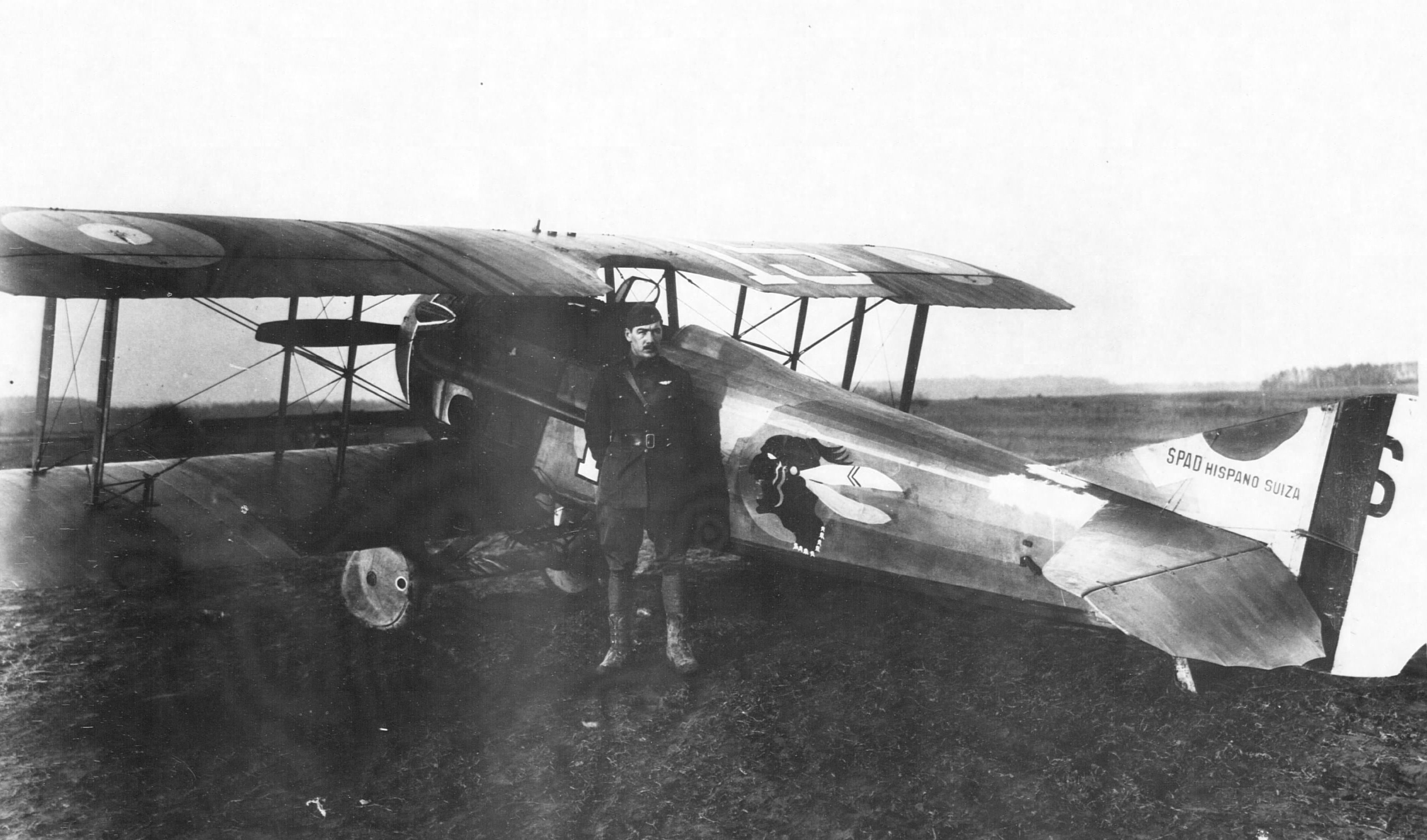
- 93d Aero Squadron – SPAD XIII, Foucaucourt Airdrome, France, November 1918
- Active: 21 August 1917 – 31 March 1919
- Country: United States
- Branch: Air Service, United States Army
- Type: Squadron
- Role: Pursuit
- Part of: American Expeditionary Forces (AEF)
- Fuselage Code: "Indian Head"
- Engagements: World War I

Commanders
- Notable commanders: Maj. Jean Huffer; Capt. Charles Rockwell

Insignia
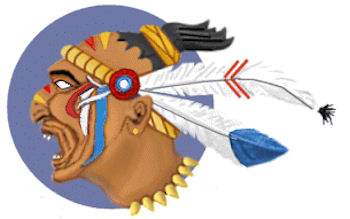
- 93d Aero Squadron Emblem (Note: Approved by AEF 18 November 1918.)

Aircraft flown
- Fighter: SPAD VII, 1918; SPAD XIII, 1918

Service record
- Operations: 3d Pursuit Group; Western Front, France: 14 August – 11 November 1918: Sorties: 1,183; Combat missions: 151; Enemy combats: 94; Enemy Aircraft shot down: 31 (1 balloon); Killed: 1; Wounded: 1; Missing: 4; Aircraft lost: 21
- Victories: Enemy Aircraft shot down: 31; Enemy Balloons shot down: 1; Total Enemy Aircraft Destroyed: 32; Air Aces: 3: Lt. Charles R. d'Olive 5 (3 shared); Lt. Leslie J. Rummel 7 (3 shared); Lt. Chester E. Wright 9 (5 shared)

The 93d Aero Squadron was an Air Service, United States Army unit that fought on the Western Front during World War I.

The squadron was assigned as a Day Pursuit (Fighter) Squadron as part of the 3d Pursuit Group, First United States Army. Its mission was to engage and clear enemy aircraft from the skies and provide escort to reconnaissance and bombardment squadrons over enemy territory. It also attacked enemy observation balloons, and perform close air support and tactical bombing attacks of enemy forces along the front lines. After the 1918 Armistice with Germany, the squadron returned to the United States in March 1919 and was demobilized.

The current United States Air Force unit which holds its lineage and history is the 93d Bomb Squadron, assigned to the 307th Operations Group at Barksdale Air Force Base, Louisiana.

== History ==
=== Origins ===
The squadron was initially formed in early August 1917 at Jefferson Barracks, Missouri, where 150 civilians were sworn into the United States Army as soldiers. The newly-sworn in men were sent to Kelly Field, Texas, where they arrived on 19 August and were organized as the 95th Aero Squadron. Initially, the squadron was trained in close order drill and other basic training into the Army. After six weeks of indoctrination, the squadron was ordered for overseas duty, moving to Hazelhurst Field#2, Garden City, Long Island on 13 October.

=== Training ===
On 15 October the troops were boarded onto the former British Cunard liner RMS Pannonia, and after an uneventful voyage embarked at the port of Liverpool, England on 29 October. From there, the squadron was moved to Camp Sorden and placed under the control of the British Royal Flying Corps (RFC) for training. At Sorden, the squadron was divided into flights for instruction in the technical aspects of maintaining aircraft and operating a squadron. Over the next several months they trained diligently, and on 1 May, the squadron was re-assembled at RFC Beaulieu for organization as a trained unit. After several more weeks of final training by the RFC, the squadron was ordered to France on 1 June, and moved to the Flower Down Rest Camp, Winchester.

The squadron arrived at Le Havre, France on 7 June and after a few days of waiting orders at the British Rest Camp, the squadron was ordered to report to the Air Service Production Center No. 2., Romorantin Aerodrome on 14 June. There, the squadron was put to work assembling newly arrived DH-4 Liberty airplanes. After two weeks at the Production Center, further orders were received and the squadron reported to the 3d Air Instructional Center at Issoudun Aerodrome, arriving on 7 July. There, the mechanics were put to work on the Nieuport and SPAD airplanes, while the pilots were instructed in combat flying.

=== Combat in France ===
On 26 July the squadron was designated as a Pursuit squadron and assigned to the Toul Sector, being stationed at Vaucouleurs Aerodrome. There the 93d was assigned to the 3d Pursuit Group, also known as the "Lafayette Group". The squadron began to receive SPAD VII pursuit planes and began receiving trained pilots. Although very under-equipped, the 93d Aero Squadron (Pursuit), began flying familiarization patrols beginning on 11 August. On 12 August, Lieutenants Meyer, Wright and Rummell went over the lines into enemy territory for the first time, flying from Apermont to Pont-a-Mousson, however no enemy planes were found. Additional patrols were flown during the next few days, all returned with "nothing to report".

On 17 August 1918 the 93d Squadron was reminded that there was a war in progress when Lieutenants Meyer, Rummell and Wright met five enemy Albatross aircraft north of Pont-a-Mousson in a heavy mist. Squadron pilots attacked the enemy at some distance, and the enemy, believing our planes were part of a larger patrol, retired towards their airdrome at Metz. On the 19th, Lt Thaw of the 135th Aero Squadron took off for Orly Field in a Dayton-Wright DH-4 with Flight Commander Meyer from the squadron as a passenger. During the trip, something went wrong with the DH-4's controls and the plane went into a spin, crashing, killing Thaw and breaking both of Meyer's legs.

The beginning of September brought increasing activity to the squadron, as the First Army was organized and concentrated in the Saint-Mihiel Sector for its first independent operation. During the buildup period, in not to call attention of the enemy, the squadron was ordered to avoid crossing the lines and to fly in small formations. The idea was to strike hard when everything was ready. On 11 September all was in readiness and a three-hour artillery bombardment was made the next morning. All planes that could be made serviceable were readied on the line with engines running at 04:45, with pilots being ready to take off at 05:00. Orders were given for the squadron to fly with a patrol of 6 aircraft to attack with machine guns a column of German infantry on the road between Chambley and Waverly. The planes took off in low clouds and in spite of Anti-Aircraft Artillery fired by the Germans, the squadron carried out its mission and completely demoralized the Germans. They had no expectation of an air attack so far behind their lines.

The squadron continued its attacks on a daily basis during the offensive, and on 13 September at about 17:00, after escorting an observation mission behind German lines, the squadron became someone split up. Lt. D'Olive met a patrol from the 103d Aero Squadron, just as the latter was about to attack some enemy aircraft. D'Olive attacked one Fokker with Lt Furlow of the 103d, and last saw the German aircraft spinning out of control. They both then climbed quickly and attacked a second Fokker, with the enemy aircraft crashing near St. Benoit. Lt. D'Olive then attacked a third German aircraft and followed his adversary down until he saw it crash near the second plane. With three planes to his credit that day, he returned to Vaucouleurs, where his actions led to his recommendation for the Distinguished Service Cross. That same day, the 93d shot down an additional four enemy aircraft.

The squadron also strafed enemy infantry forces in Vegneuvilles, St. Renois, Dampvitoux as well as Chambley. Columns of infantry and vehicles were attacked on roads as well as troop concentrations that were observed. With the end of the offensive on 19 August, air activity slowed down, while First Army re-equipped and re-armed for a new offensive, and also partly because of bad weather. On 21 September the 3d Pursuit Group moved to Lisle-en-Barrois Aerodrome, where it made ready for a new offensive on the Verdun front. There the squadron was re-equipped with more powerful and capable SPAD XIIIs, that also had a bombing capability. On the 25th, the 93d carried out its first bombing patrol, however dense fog near the lines forced it to turn back. Lt Wright, started back and over Verdun wanted to see his bombs explode. Him and Lts. Rummer and Mertz were met by heavy enemy machine gun fire from the ground, but Lt Wright was able to drop his bombs and safely turned back. However, Lt. Merz was hit in the leg, and spent the rest of the war in hospital.

On 26 September First Army began its great offensive near Verdun, and in response the German Air Service responded, very much reinforced. The squadron saw enemy aircraft patrolling and escorting reconnaissance planes in the region of Etain, and the patrol had a narrow escape. During the offensive, squadron pilots inflicted heavy losses upon enemy aircraft and balloons. As its pilots gained domination of the air, their responsibilities were expanded to include protection of ground forces, strafing of enemy troops and bombing of targets that could be observed within enemy lines.

The 93d Aero Squadron moved on 5 November to Foucaucourt Aerodrome, however weather conditions limited its operations to below the clouds and to attacks on enemy infantry forces on the ground. Combat operations continued until the Armistice with Germany was signed and combat ended on 11 November 1918.

=== Demobilization ===
Proficiency flights were conducted after the Armistice with Germany, however, no flights were permitted to be flown over German-controlled territory. The squadron remained at Foucaucourt until 15 December when it was ordered to the 1st Air Depot at Colombey-les-Belles Airdrome and turned in all of its aircraft and equipment. The squadron's SPAD aircraft were delivered to the Air Service American Air Service Acceptance Park No. 1 at Orly Aerodrome to be returned to the French. There practically all of the pilots and observers were detached from the squadron.

Personnel at Colombey were subsequently assigned to the commanding general, services of supply, and ordered to report to one of several staging camps in France. There, personnel awaited scheduling to report to one of the base ports in France for transport to the United States and subsequent demobilization. On 4 Mar 1919, the squadron was moved to the port of Brest prior to its return to the United States. Upon arrival the men were caught up on any back pay owed to them, de-loused, a formal military records review was performed and a passenger list was created prior to the men boarding a ship.

The 93d Aero Squadron arrived in New York Harbor on 12 March. The men were sent to Garden City, Long Island, where they were demobilized and returned to civilian life. The squadron itself was demobilized on 31 March 1919.

== Lineage ==
- Organized as the 93d Aero Squadron on 21 August 1917

Redesignated: 93d Aero Squadron (Pursuit) on 26 July 1918
Demobilized on 31 March 1919 (Note: Subsequent lineage information in Endicott, Factsheet 93 Bomb Squadron.)

=== Assignments ===
- Post Headquarters, Kelly Field, 21 August 1917
- Aviation Concentration Center, 13 October 1917
- Air Service Headquarters, AEF, British Isles

Attached to the Royal Flying Corps for training, 30 October 1917 – 1 June 1918

- Air Service Production Center No. 2, 14 June 1918
- 3d Air Instructional Center, 7 July 1918
- 3d Pursuit Group, 26 July 1918
- 1st Air Depot, 15 December 1918
- Air Service Production Center No. 2, 1 February 1919
- Commanding General, Services of Supply, 4 Mar 1919
- Eastern Department, 13–31 March 1919

=== Stations ===
- Kelly Field, Texas, 21 August 1917
- Aviation Concentration Center, Garden City, New York, 13 October 1917
- Port of Entry, Hoboken, New Jersey

Overseas transport: R.M.S. Pannonia, 15–29 October 1917

- Liverpool, England, 29 October 1917
- Camp Sorden, England

Squadron dispersed to several RFC stations in England

- Beaulieu, England, 1 May 1918
- Flower Down Rest Camp, Winchester, England, 1 June 1918
- Le Havre, France, 7 June 1918
- Romorantin Aerodrome, 14 June 1918
- Issoudun Aerodrome, 7 July 1918
- Vaucouleurs Aerodrome, 26 July 1918
- Lisle-en-Barrois Aerodrome, France, 24 September 1918
- Foucaucourt Aerodrome, France, 6 November 1918
- Colombey-les-Belles Airdrome, France, 15 December 1918
- Romorantin Aerodrome, France, 2 February 1919
- Brest, France, 4 March 1919
- Garden City, New York, 13–31 Mar 1919

=== Combat sectors and campaigns ===
Streamer	Sector/Campaign	Dates	Notes
	Toul Sector	11 August – 11 September 1918	
	Saint-Mihiel Offensive Campaign	12–16 September 1918	
	Meuse-Argonne Offensive Campaign	26 September – 11 November 1918	

=== Notable personnel ===
- Lt. Charles R. d'Olive, Distinguished Service Cross, air ace
- Lt. Alfred B. Patterson, Jr., Distinguished Service Cross (2x), 3 aerial victories (Killed in Action)
- Lt. Leslie J. Rummell, Distinguished Service Cross, air ace
- Lt. Chester E. Wright, Distinguished Service Cross (2x), air ace
- JAmes J Maloney [1896-1959} Director of the United States Secret Service 1946-1948.

== See also ==
- Organization of the Air Service of the American Expeditionary Force
- List of American Aero Squadrons
