= Lisle-en-Barrois =

- Commune
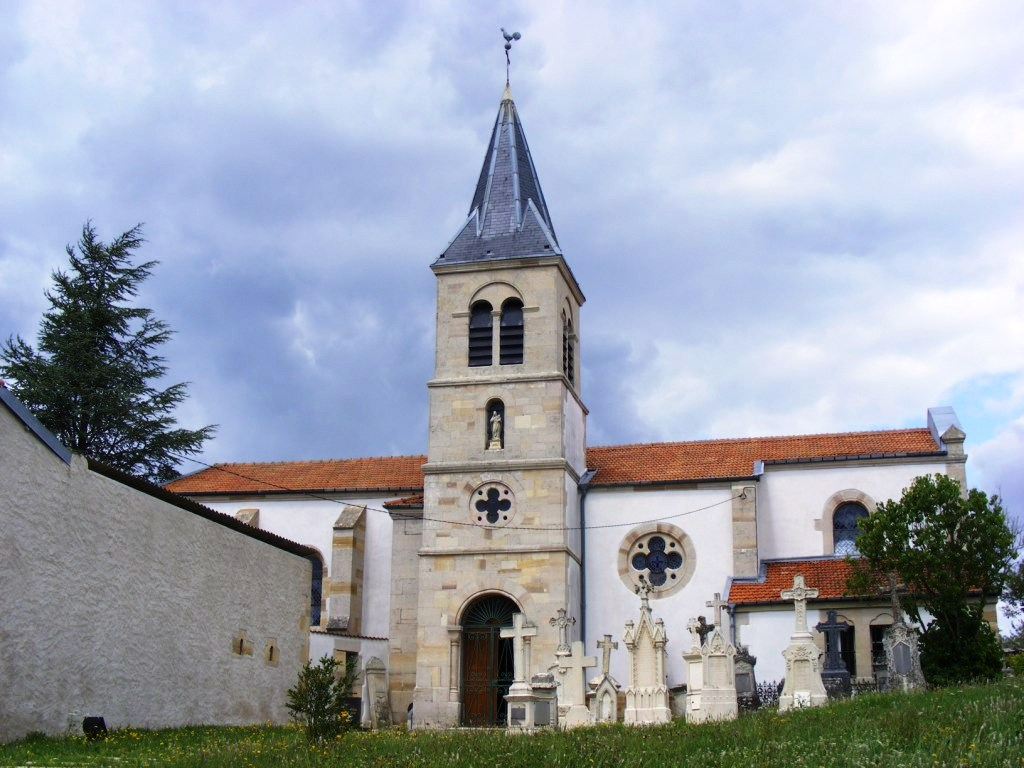
- The abbey in Lisle-en-Barrois

- Coat of arms
- Location of Lisle-en-Barrois
- Location within France Location within Grand Est
- Coordinates: 48°53′49″N 5°07′37″E
- Country: France
- Region: Grand Est
- Department: Meuse
- Arrondissement: Bar-le-Duc
- Canton: Revigny-sur-Ornain
- Intercommunality: CC de l'Aire à l'Argonne

Government
  - Mayor (2020–2026): Christophe Lang
- Area^{1}: 28.94 km^{2} (11.17 sq mi)
- Elevation: 200 m (660 ft)
- Highest elevation: 257 m (843 ft)
- Lowest elevation: 154 m (505 ft)
- Population (2023): 27
  - Density: 0.93/km^{2} (2.4/sq mi)
- Time zone: UTC+01:00 (CET)
  - Summer (DST): UTC+02:00 (CEST)
- INSEE/Postal code: 55295 /55250
- ^{1} French Land Register data, which excludes lakes, ponds, glaciers > 1 km^{2} (0.386 sq mi or 247 acres) and river estuaries.

Lisle-en-Barrois (French pronunciation: [lil ɑ̃ baʁwa], lit. 'Lisle in Barrois') is a commune in the Meuse department in Grand Est in north-eastern France. It is part of the Bar-le-Duc arrondissement, and is approximately 17 km (11 miles) north of Bar-le-Duc itself.

As of 2021, the population of Lisle-en-Barrois stood at just 30 residents. Like many rural communes in France, its population has seen a gradual decline over the years due to urban migration and demographic changes.

== See also ==
- Communes of the Meuse department
