= Issoudun Aerodrome =

- Part of American Expeditionary Forces (AEF)
- Located near: Issoudun, France
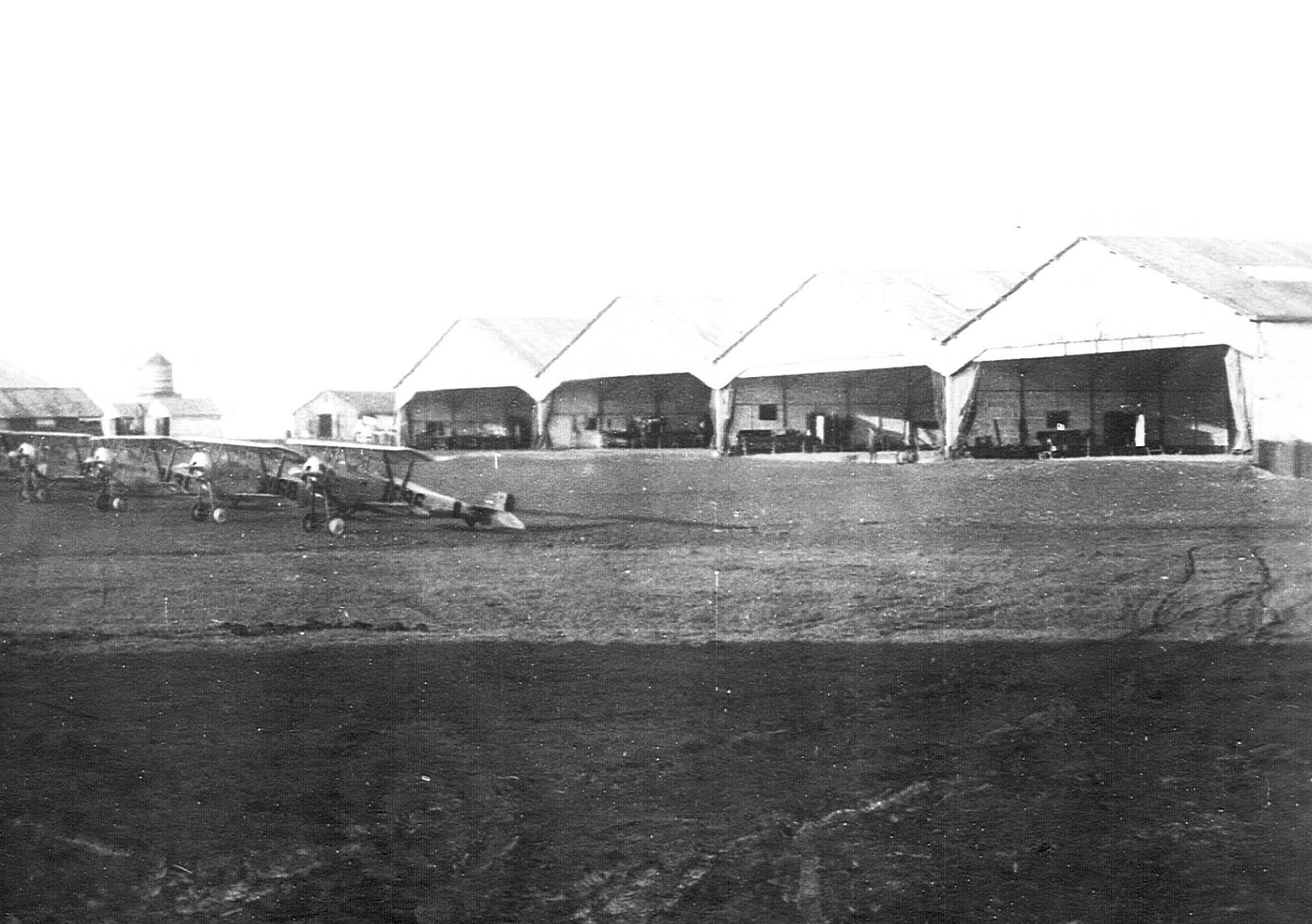
- Issoudun Aerodrome - Field 3 with Nieuport 23M, 80 HP single seat (solo) aircraft, 1918.

Site information
- Type: Training Complex
- Controlled by: Air Service, United States Army
- Condition: Abandoned, agricultural fields

Location
- Coordinates: 46°57′38″N 001°59′39″E

Site history
- Built: 1917
- In use: 1917-1918
- Battles/wars: World War I

Garrison information
- Garrison: Third Aviation Instruction Center (3d AIC)

Issoudun Aerodrome was a complex of military airfields in the vicinity of Issoudun, Centre, France. They were used during World War I as part of the Third Aviation Instruction Center, American Expeditionary Forces for training United States airmen prior to being sent into combat on the Western Front.

It was at that time the largest air base in the world. Today the entire complex consists of agricultural fields, the military facility totally obscured with no trace of its wartime history.

== History ==
=== Background ===
By the summer of 1917, two and a half years of the air war had begun to take a serious toll on the number of French and British aviators. While the United States possessed a relatively enormous pool of human resources, they lacked the well developed training methods and aircraft production capabilities of the Allies. In order to maximize the resources of both, the French submitted a memorandum to General George O. Squier, then the Chief Signal Officer of the U.S. Army, suggesting the establishment of an American advanced flying school in France.

The site decided upon for this advanced aviation school was Issoudun, France. Issoudun, located about 100 miles southeast of Paris, was primarily chosen because the surrounding countryside was extremely level and relatively sparsely populated with wide-open spaces for flying fields. The site was also relatively close to a major government-owned railroad line. Probably just as important was its proximity to the aviation factories and new plane assembly fields in the south which were to supply the aircraft to be used in the training at Issoudun. In spite of the advantages of this location, significant work was required to bring the Third Aviation Instruction Center (3rd AIC), as it was to be named, to life.

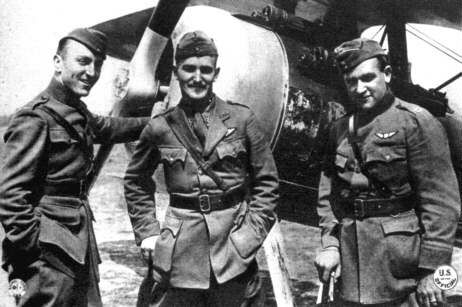
Eddie Rickenbacker, Douglas Campbell, and Kenneth Marr of the 94th Aero Pursuit Squadron all trained at Issoudun

When General John J. Pershing first saw the site, it was nothing but a series of flat fields, with no barracks, hangars, buildings or classroom facilities. Under the agreement with the French, the United States was, “...to furnish 200 workmen to erect it (3d AIC) and ‘all the tools, nails and other implements necessary,’ including a narrow-gauge railroad, while France was to furnish the planes, motors and suitably cleared land.” With this accomplished, American pilots were to begin training in July 1917 and be ready for the front in the fall of the same year.

While this proposal was approved by Pershing, it met some resistance when it reached the Secretary of War. With an initial price tag of almost $800,000 just to open the field, the proposal was rejected by the Secretary of War on 19 May 1917. That same day the proposal was resubmitted with the additional argument that a facility such as the 3d AIC was critical to the development of the air forces that would accompany the A.E.F. to Europe. This time the proposal was accepted, and by July 1917, the first Aero Construction Squadrons began to arrive in France.

By early fall of that same year construction at the field was in full-swing. While the initial pace of building was hectic in an effort to make the base operational as quickly as possible, construction at Issoudun was never really completed and continued right up to the 1918 Armistice with Germany. As a result of this furious pace of construction, Issoudun was fully operational and training was being conducted within a months of Pershing accepting the base.

=== Third Aviation Instruction Center ===
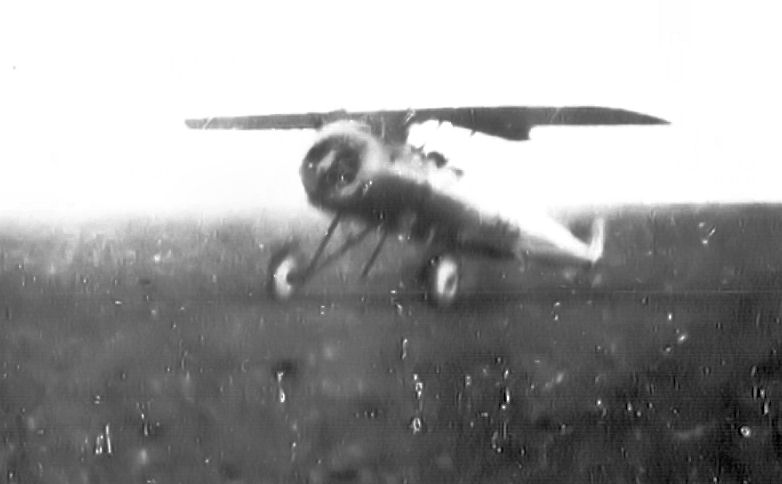
Morane rouleur high-speed taxiing trainer on Field 1

The 3d AIC at Issoudun was initially to be merely a “refresher course” for American pursuit pilots arriving in France, prior to being sent to the front. The intent was for the American pilots, having already received advance training in the United States, to become acquainted with the current tactics and aircraft being used at the front.

The advanced aviation schools in the U.S. were slow to develop and lacked both aircraft of the type being used at the front and pilots with combat experience to act as instructors. This lack of advance training in the U.S. dictated the development of a complete course in advanced flying and aerial tactics at Issoudun.

Initially, the school was initially staffed primarily by French instructors, used French airplanes, and consequently, followed the French Bleriot system of instruction. At the time, America did not have the time, resources or pilots to establish its own program in France and therefore relied totally on the French to prepare American pilots for combat duty. American pilots with combat experience and flying time in the type of aircraft being flown at the front were a rare commodity. Many of them were flying with French units, or the Lafayette Escadrille, and chose to remain with those units rather than join the A.E.F. Gradually, American pilots, either graduates from Issoudun or from the American front-line units began to replace their French counterparts. Even with this gradual transition though, the training program at Issoudun remained fundamentally the Bleriot system. The various fields at Issoudun (initially nine, later expanded to 15) each provided a different phase of instruction, allowing the student to progress in successive stages of training until adequately prepared to participate at the front.

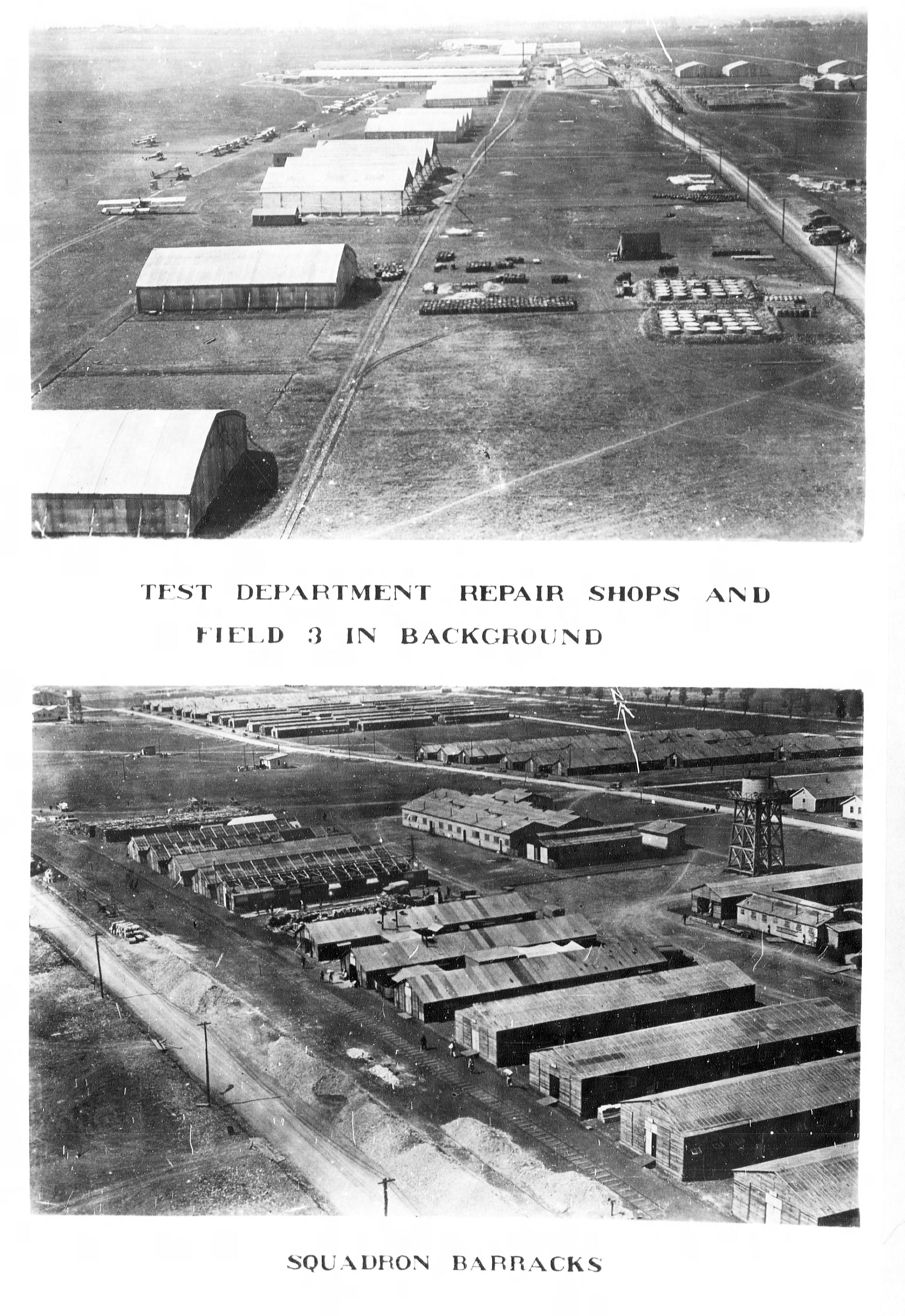

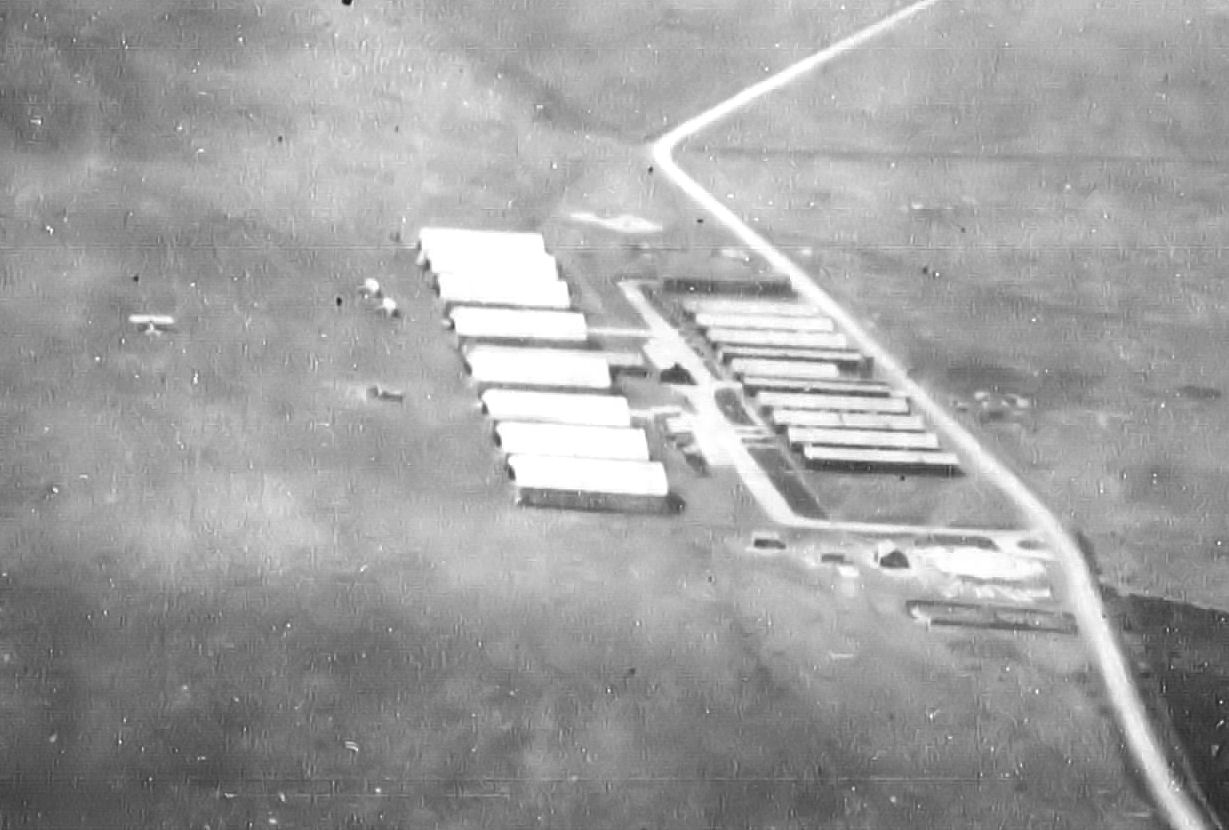
Field 5 showing Nieuport 15M, 80 HP and 120 HP aircraft

The student's progression through these fields was typically as follows:

- Main Aerodrome

Field 1, 46°59′50″N 001°51′58″E Rouleur Field; Primary instruction, high speed taxiing
Field 2, 47°00′26″N 001°52′27″E Main Field, Dual-control instruction, first solo flight
Field 3, 47°00′47″N 001°53′02″E Solo Flying, Cross Country, basic aerobatics

The main aerodrome were also used for new aircraft delivered to the base and the major hangar repair field, for testing repaired or rebuilt aircraft

- Field 4, 47°00′15″N 001°54′27″E Used for spiral turns
- Field 5, 47°00′27″N 001°56′11″E Used for taxiing, taking off, and landing and wing slips
- Field 6, 46°59′12″N 001°55′20″E Aerobatic Field; Used for advanced acrobatics

Fields #4, #5, #6 were used for basic flight training

- Field 7, 46°56′49″N 001°53′33″E Valentine Field, Used for training in formation flying
- Field 8, 46°57′45″N 001°50′22″E Used for aerial combat training
- Field 9, 47°01′50″N 001°49′35″E Introduction to the Nieuport 18M (Graduates either proceeded to Field 10 for 2-seater training or to Field 4 for pursuit training)
- Field 10, 46°58′10″N 001°54′16″E Used for observation pilot training (DH 4)
- Field 11, 46°56′08″N 001°50′39″E Under Construction 1 October 1918, not used
- Field 12, 47°00′51″N 001°48′35″E Under Construction 1 October 1918, not used
- Field 13, 47°01′21″N 001°53′03″E Under Construction 1 October 1918, not used (planned for aerial gunnery)
- Field 14, 46°57′10″N 001°46′45″E Used for machine gun training in aerial gunnery
- Field 15, 47°02′39″N 001°58′31″E Under Construction 1 October 1918, not used

Operating the 3rd Aviation Instruction Center required a large number of organizations. Serving at Issoudun were the following U.S. Aero Squadrons: 10th, 21st, 26th, 30th, 31st, 32nd, 33rd, 35th, 37th, 43rd, 101st, 149th, 158th, 173rd, 257, 369th, 372nd, 374th, 640th, 641st, 642nd, 644th, 801st, 802nd, and 1104th.

When the first students of the school at Issoudun reported for duty to the front they were among the most extensively trained pilots of the day. The average American pilot received about 60 hours of training at Issoudun and by the time he had completed aerial gunnery school, he averaged over 100 hours of training, “...nearly triple the number of hours of flying time with which pilots of the Royal Air Force had been reporting to their combat units two years earlier.”

When the Armistice was signed on 11 November 1918, Issoudun was the largest flying school in the world. More than 1,800 men had attended advanced training at Issoudun, of whom 829 completed the pursuit course, 627 served in combat against the Germans on the Western Front, and 202 became instructors. The combat record of those who went to the front speaks for itself—781 enemy planes and 73 balloons destroyed at the cost of 289 aircraft and 48 balloons lost by the AEF.

=== Closure ===
The United States Air Service formally left Issoudun Airdrome on 28 June 1919 almost eight months after the war ended. The sites of the former airfields have returned to their previous status as agricultural fields.

On 28 June 2009, the people of Issoudun had a commemoration ceremony in honor of the American aviators who had trained, and in many cases, died while training there. A single monument on Department Route 960 remains to mark Issoudun's part in the Great War.

=== Training aircraft used ===
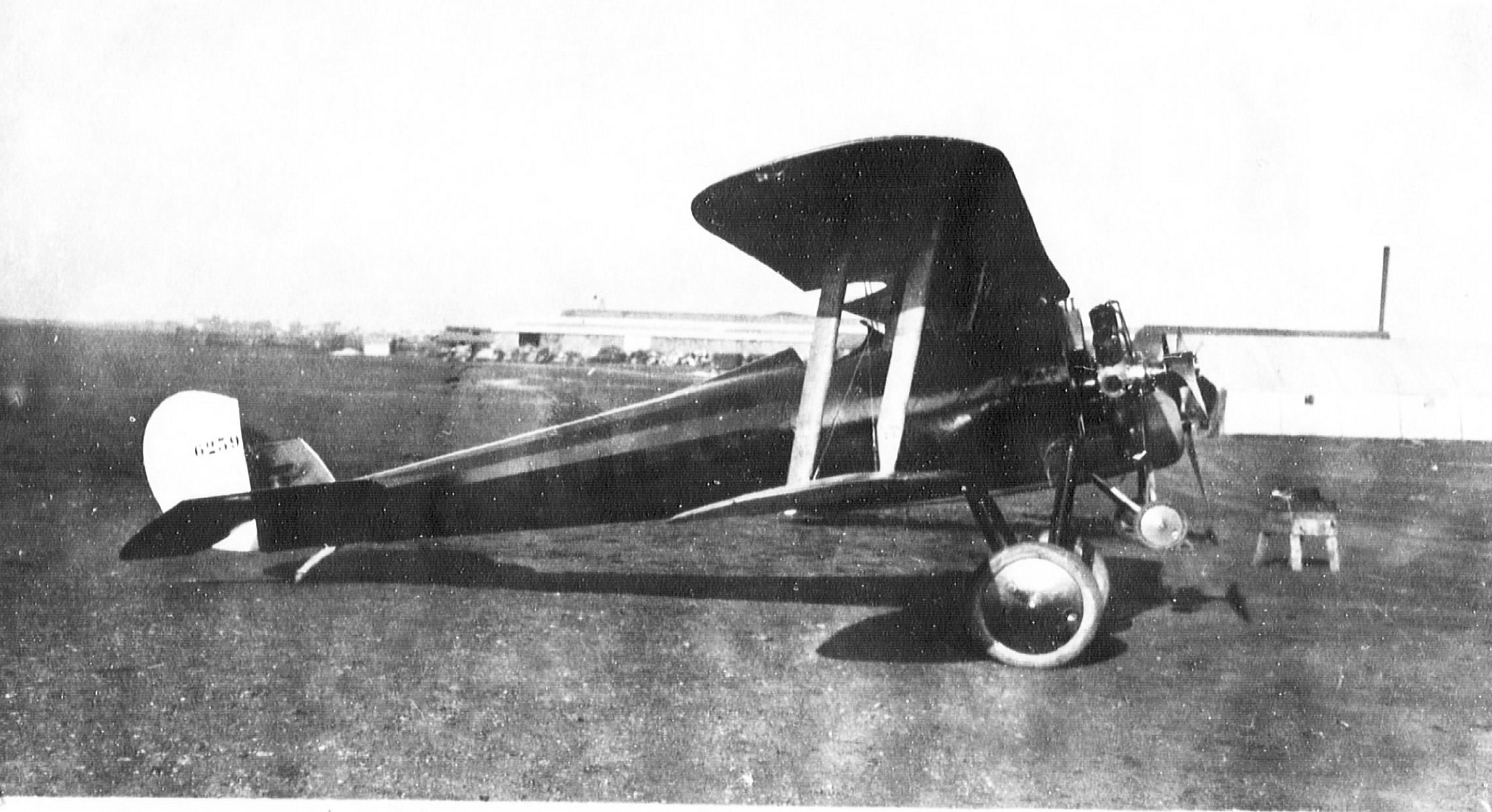
Nieuport 28 shown on Issoudun Field 8

- Morane rouleurs (preliminary training ground training aircraft, fitted with clipped wings)
- Morane-Saulnier AI
- de Havilland DH-4
- Nieuport 15M
- Nieuport 18M
- Nieuport 23
- Nieuport 24
- Nieuport 28

=== Known squadrons assigned ===
- 95th Aero Squadron (Pursuit), 16 November 1917 – 18 February 1918
- 103d Aero Squadron (Pursuit), 24 December 1917 – 18 February 1918
- 94th Aero Squadron (Pursuit), 24 January - 5 March 1918
- 13th Aero Squadron (Pursuit), 27 January - 11 May 1918
- 27th Aero Squadron (Pursuit), 29 March-24 April 1918
- 139th Aero Squadron (Pursuit), 29 March-28 May 1918
- 28th Aero Squadron (Pursuit), 24–27 June 1918
- 22d Aero Squadron (Observation), 26 June-7 July 1918
- 49th Aero Squadron (Pursuit), 2–28 July 1918
- 93d Aero Squadron (Pursuit), 7–28 July 1918
- 135th Aero Squadron (Observation), 2–19 July 1918
- 1st Aero Squadron (Observation), 29 September-19 October 1918

== See also ==
- List of United States Air Service aerodromes in France
- Châteauroux-Déols Air Base Cold War USAF NATO depot Air Base located 13 miles southwest of Issoudun Aerodrome Complex.
- Location Map of Issoudun Aerodromes
