= William Howard Stovall =

US Army flying ace and later staff officer

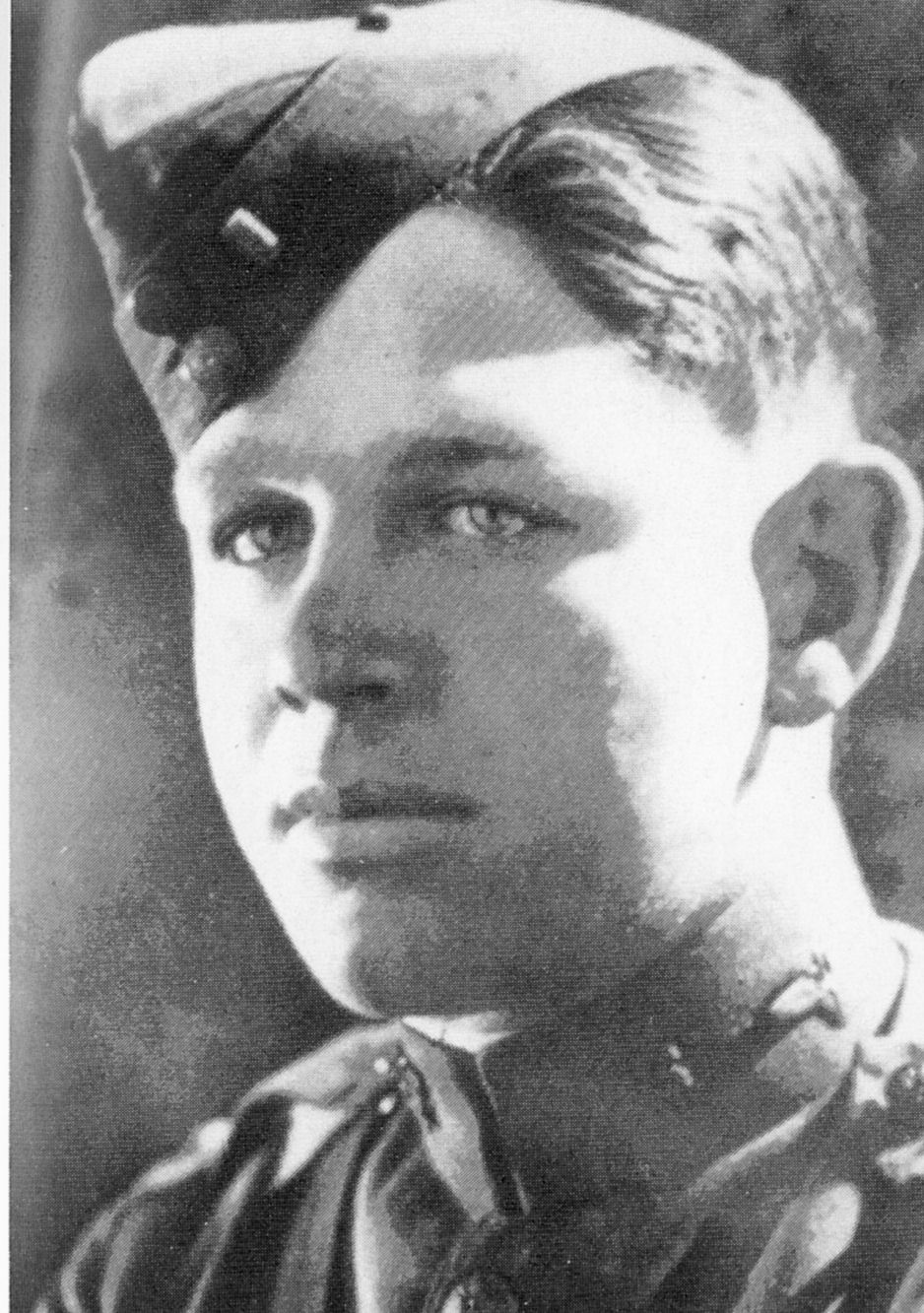
- Lieutenant William H. Stovall, 13th Aero Squadron, 1918
- Born: 18 February 1895; Stovall, Mississippi, US
- Died: 11 May 1970 (aged 75); Stovall, Mississippi, US
- Military career
- Allegiance: United States
- Branch: Air Service, United States Army
- Service years: 1917–1918; 1941–1945
- Rank: Colonel
- Nickname: Hank
- Unit: 13th Aero Squadron
- Conflicts: World War I World War II
- Awards: Distinguished Service Cross; Victory Medal with 3 battle clasps; Legion of Merit with Oak Leaf Cluster; Bronze Star; European Theatre of Operations ribbon with 5 battle stars; British Order of the British Empire; French Legion d'Honneur; French Croix de Guerre with Palm
- Other work: Deputy Chief of Staff of U.S. Strategic Air Force during World War II

William Howard Stovall (18 February 1895 – 11 May 1970) was an American flying ace of World War I and an Army Air Forces staff officer in World War II. In civilian life, he was a successful cotton farmer.

Stovall began his military career as a pilot during World War I. He was credited with six aerial victories and achieved the rank of First Lieutenant. He went on to become a successful businessman before serving in World War II. In that war, he served once again with fellow aerial combat veterans from World War I, Frank O'Driscoll Hunter and Carl Spaatz, rising to the rank of Colonel. He also suffered the loss of his namesake son in an aerial battle.

Upon return from the war, Stovall won awards for his agricultural expertise. He died in his sleep at home, aged 75.

== Biography ==
William Howard Stovall was born on his family's cotton plantation in Stovall, Mississippi on 18 February 1895. He was the son of Colonel William Howard Stovall, who had fought for the Confederacy in the American Civil War. He graduated from Lawrenceville School in 1913, then attended Yale and graduated in 1916.

He reported to the 13th Aero Squadron in July 1918. On 1 August, in company with Charles Biddle and two other American pilots, he shot down two German Albatros D.V fighters over Viéville-en-Haye. Then, from 15 September to 23 October 1918, he downed four of the new Fokker D.VII fighters. He was awarded the Distinguished Service Cross.

He returned to the plantation after the war. During World War II, he served once again, joining the U.S. Army Air Forces as a Major on 12 December 1941. After helping bring over the first 180 airplanes for the 8th AAF, 1st FG, 97th BG, 60th TCG in the BOLERO Movement, he became the Deputy Chief of Staff for Personnel, A-1, for the Eighth Air Force in Britain under a World War I comrade, Brigadier General Frank O'Driscoll Hunter; the two of them worked for another World War I companion, General Carl Spaatz, who had flown in the 13th PS (WWI), and Stovall became DC/S for the USSTAFE under Spaatz. Stovall's son, William Howard Stovall, also served in the Army Air Forces in the 56th FG/62nd FS; he saw his father in England during Christmas 1944 before the younger Stovall was killed in action on 31 December 1944 while engaging seven enemy aircraft over Burgsteinfurt in northern Germany. He had to bail out of his battle damaged plane after a 50-mile running combat and he was too low and his parachute did not deploy all the way. He downed two of the seven in combat. Colonel Stovall met the pilot who thought he had accidentally killed his son. Colonel Stovall proved otherwise when he developed gun camera film that showed the pilot had not fired long enough and that the deflection angle of his guns were not anywhere near his son's plane.

From this war, Colonel Stovall brought home the Legion of Merit w/OLC, Bronze Star, European, African, Middle Eastern Campaign Ribbon w/5 Bronze Stars, American Campaign Medal, D Day Campaign Medal, Army of the Occupation Medal, Military Order of the British Empire, French Legion d'Honneur and Croix de Guerre w/Palm, as well as campaign ribbons. Once again, he returned to the family cotton plantation. His stewardship of the land earned him the Delta Council Achievement Award for 1967-1968 as the pre-eminent conservationist among local farmers. He also served as president of Cotton Council International. The Federal Land Bank granted him a 50th anniversary medal for his contributions to the cause of American agriculture just prior to his death.

He died at home in his sleep on 11 May 1970. He was survived by his wife Eleanor, a daughter, and two sons.

He was the inspiration for the Colonel Harvey Stovall character in the book and movie Twelve O'Clock High (in which the character was played by Dean Jagger); in the TV series adaptation 12 O'Clock High, the character was played by Frank Overton, who bore a remarkable resemblance to the real Colonel Stovall, the character likewise during the series having a son who is reported Missing in Action.

== Citations for award ==
Distinguished Service Cross (DSC)

The Distinguished Service Cross is presented to William Howard Stovall, First Lieutenant (Air Service), U.S. Army, for extraordinary heroism in action in the region of Etain, France, September 26, 1918. While leading a protection patrol over a day bombing formation First Lieutenant Stovall's patrol became reduced through motor trouble to himself and one other pilot. When the bombing patrol was attacked by seven enemy planes he in turn attacked the enemy and destroyed one plane.

== See also ==
- List of World War I flying aces from the United States

== Bibliography ==
- Norman Franks; Harry Dempsey. American Aces of World War I. Osprey Publishing, 2001. ISBN 1-84176-375-6, ISBN 978-1-84176-375-0.
- Norman Franks; Frank Bailey. Over the Front: A Complete Record of the Fighter Aces and Units of the United States and French Air Services, 1914–1918 Grub Street, 1992. ISBN 0-948817-54-2, ISBN 978-0-948817-54-0.
- Jon Guttman. SPAD XII/XIII Aces of World War I Osprey Publishing, 2002. ISBN 1841763160, 9781841763163.
