= Gorman DeFreest Larner =

American World War I flying ace

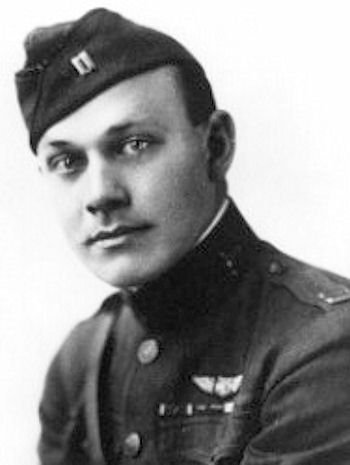
- Gorman DeFreest Larner, 1918
- Born: July 5, 1897; Washington, D.C., USA
- Died: May 20, 1984 (aged 86); Easton, Maryland, USA
- Burial place: Woodlawn Memorial Park, Easton, Maryland, Plot: East of "Garden of the Oaks"
- Military career
- Allegiance: France; United States
- Branch: Aéronautique Militaire (France); Air Service, United States Army
- Rank: Captain
- Units: Aéronautique Militaire: Escadrille SPA.86; Air Service, United States Army: 103d Aero Squadron
- Conflicts: World War I World War II
- Awards: Distinguished Service Cross with Oak Leaf Cluster, French Croix de Guerre
- Other work: Organized first Air National Guard unit

Captain Gorman DeFreest Larner (July 5, 1897 – May 20, 1984) was a World War I flying ace credited with seven aerial victories.

== World War I ==
Larner was too young to join U. S. aviation, so he dropped out of Columbia University and began pilot's training at the private Curtiss Flying School in Buffalo, New York. He joined the French air service in July 1917. In December, he was assigned to Escadrille Spa.86. He used his Spad to down two enemy planes a week apart, on 18 and 25 March 1918; the latter victory was shared with Frank Hunter. The following month, he was commissioned into American service, but remained with the French until June. He was then transferred to the American 103rd Aero Squadron as a Flight Commander. He scored five more aerial victories with them, from 13 September to 4 November 1918. On 8 November, he was promoted to captain.

== Between the World Wars ==
Larner stayed in France as part of the Peace Commission, and did not return to the U. S. until September 1919. He resumed his studies, and graduated in 1921, becoming a banker. Along with George Augustus Vaughn, Jr. and Howard Burdick, he helped form the 102nd Observation Squadron of the New York National Guard; it was the Guard's first air unit.

== World War II and beyond ==
Larner returned to service during World War II, rising to the rank of Colonel in the United States Army Air Corps Reserve. After the war, he became Chairman of the National Aeronautical Association and the Chairman of Robinson Aviation, Inc., of Tetersboro, New Jersey.

== Honors and awards ==
Distinguished Service Cross (DSC)

The Distinguished Service Cross is presented to Gorman DeFreest Larner, First Lieutenant (Air Service), U.S. Army, for extraordinary heroism in action in the region of Champeny, France, September 13, 1918. Lieutenant Larner attacked an enemy patrol of six machines (Fokker type), and fought against the great odds until he had destroyed one and forced the others to retire. (General Orders No. 145, W.D., 1918)

Distinguished Service Cross (DSC) - Oak Leaf Cluster

The Distinguished Service Cross is presented to Gorman DeFreest Larner, First Lieutenant (Air Service), U.S. Army, for extraordinary heroism in action in the region of Montfaucon, France, October 4, 1918. While leading a patrol of four monoplace planes, Lieutenant Lamer led his patrol in an attack on an enemy formation of seven planes. By skillfully maneuvering he crushed one of the enemy machines and with the aid of his patrol forced the remainder of the enemy formation to withdraw. (General Orders No. 145, W.D., 1918)

== See also ==
- List of World War I flying aces from the United States

== Bibliography ==
- American Aces of World War 1 Harry Dempsey. Osprey Publishing, 2001. ISBN 1-84176-375-6, ISBN 978-1-84176-375-0.
