= William Thomas Ponder =

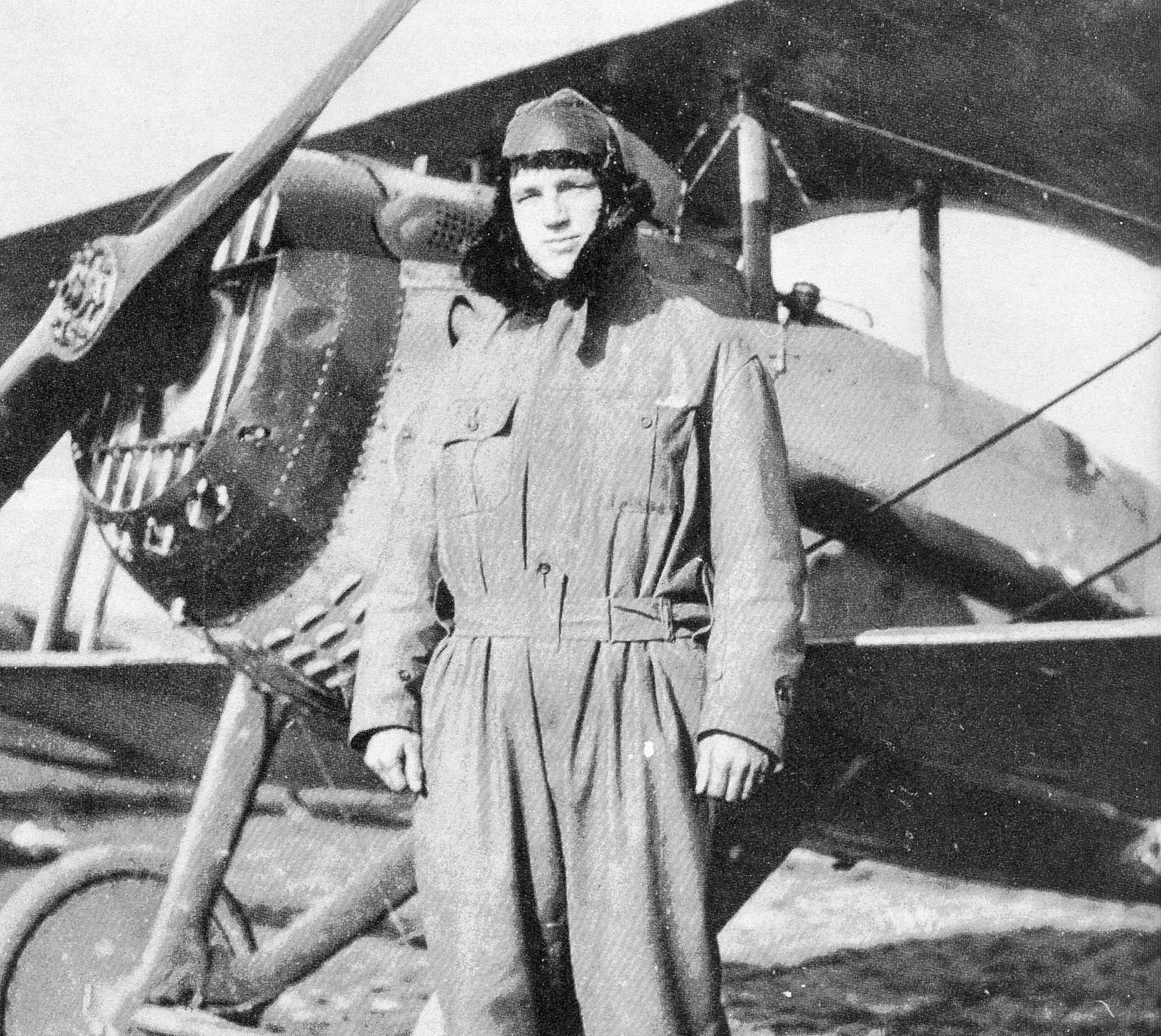
- Lieutenant William T. Ponder, 103d Aero Squadron, Foucaucourt Aerodrome, France, standing with his SPAD S.XIII, 1918
- Born: 15 March 1891; Llano, Texas, US
- Died: 27 February 1947 (aged 55); Amarillo, Texas
- Burial place: Riverside Cemetery, Mangum, Oklahoma
- Military career
- Allegiance: United States
- Branch: Service Aéronautique, United States Army Air Service
- Rank: Lieutenant
- Nickname: "Bill"
- Units: French: Escadrille 67, Escadrille 163; American 103rd Aero Squadron
- Conflicts: World War I
- Awards: Distinguished Service Cross, French Croix de Guerre

Lieutenant William Thomas Ponder was an American World War I flying ace credited with six aerial victories.

== World War I ==
William Thomas Ponder joined the French air service in the fall of 1917. He was originally assigned to Escadrille SPA 67, then Escadrille SPA 163. While with this unit, he used a Spad to down three German planes between 28 May and 11 August 1918; one of these victories was shared with Thomas Cassady. While serving with the French, Ponder was a corporal. When he transferred to an American unit, the 103rd Aero Squadron, he was commissioned as an officer. He scored three more times in the month of October to become a flying ace; four of these victories were shared, including one with Frank O'Driscoll Hunter.

In May 1918, while in Paris, Ponder took a French war bride. A year later, on 14 May 1919, he was promoted to captain before returning to America.

== Between the World Wars ==
Upon his return to Mangum, he became city manager for a couple of years. Mangum's first municipal airfield was named Ponder Field in his honor. After departing this job, Ponder would work at a variety of jobs over the ensuing years. He delivered aircraft for Lockheed, worked in a news agency, and dealt in petroleum contracts.

During the Prohibition era, Ponder was caught smuggling alcohol into the United States from Mexico. On 25 May 1932, he was chased about 200 miles as he flew into the U.S. He landed at San Angelo, Texas; his pursuer promptly landed in front of him, blocking him on the runway. Caught with either 627 or 1,500 bottles of illicit Mexican beer—accounts differ—he was held on $1,500 bond. The newspapers were also at odds over Ponder's wartime victories—one crediting him with 17 victories, the other with only 11.

On 18 November 1932, he was caught near Poteet for smuggling 80 gallons of alcohol via airplane. On 8 April 1933, he was convicted and sentenced to six months in federal detention.

== World War II and beyond ==
During the war, Ponder worked for Consolidated Vultee Aircraft Corporation in Fort Worth. He also delivered Globe Swift aircraft from San Angelo. He also founded the Ponder Aircraft Sales Company. He was on a sales trip for his company when he died of a heart attack in a hotel room in Amarillo on 27 February 1947.

== Decorations and awards ==
- Distinguished Service Cross (DSC)

The Distinguished Service Cross is presented to William Thomas Ponder, First Lieutenant (Air Service), U.S. Army, for extraordinary heroism in action near Fontaines, France, October 23, 1918. Having been separated from, his patrol, Lieutenant Ponder observed and went to the assistance of an allied plane which was being attacked by 30 of the enemy. Lieutenant Ponder destroyed one enemy plane and so demoralized the remaining that both he and his comrade were able to return to their lines. General Orders No. 46, W.D., 1919.

- He was also bequeathed the French Croix de Guerre with four palms.

== See also ==
- Lafayette Flying Corps
- List of World War I flying aces from the United States

== Bibliography ==
- Franks, Norman; Dempsey, Harry (2001). American Aces of World War 1. Osprey Publishing. ISBN 978-1-84176-375-0.
- —; Bailey, Frank (1992). Over the Front: A Complete Record of the Fighter Aces and Units of the United States and French Air Services, 1914–1918. Grub Street. ISBN 978-0-948817-54-0.
