= Paul Frank Baer =

American World War I fighter pilot

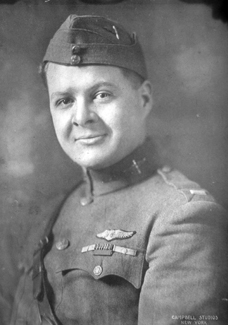
- Paul Frank Baer
- Born: January 29, 1894; Fort Wayne, Indiana, US
- Died: December 9, 1930 (aged 36); Shanghai, China
- Burial place: Lindenwood Cemetery, Fort Wayne, Indiana, US
- Military career
- Allegiance: United States
- Branch: Aéronautique Militaire (France); Air Service, United States Army
- Service years: 1917–1930
- Rank: First lieutenant
- Units: Aéronautique Militaire: Escadrille N.124 (Lafayette Escadrille); Escadrille SPA.80; Air Service, United States Army: 103rd Aero Squadron
- Conflicts: World War I
- Awards: American Distinguished Service Cross with Oak Leaf Cluster; French Legion d'Honneur and Croix de Guerre

Paul Frank Baer (January 29, 1894 – December 9, 1930) was an American fighter pilot for the United States Army Air Service in World War I. He was credited with nine confirmed victories and seven unconfirmed victory claims, making him the first flying ace in American military aviation history.

== Early life and characteristics ==
Paul Frank Baer quit selling Cadillacs to join the military. He was described as short, sturdy, pink-cheeked, square-featured, with brown hair and blue eyes.

== World War I service ==
Baer joined the Lafayette Flying Corps in 1917, being posted to Escadrille N.80 from August 1917 to January 1918. He transferred to the Lafayette Escadrille in January 1918 to transition into the 103rd Aero Squadron of the United States Army Air Service. He scored his first aerial victory for the 103rd, on 11 March 1918; it was the first triumph by a pilot of an Air Service unit. Baer scored his fifth victory on 23 April 1918, making him the first Air Service ace. However, Baer was not the first American ace; that honor went to Frederick Libby, who flew as an observer/gunner with the Royal Flying Corps.

He continued to score; on 22 May, he brought down his ninth victim to lead all American pilots. However, he was shot down during this victory, and fell into German hands. He would remain a prisoner of war until after the armistice. If his seven unconfirmed wins had been verified, he would have been one of the leading American aces.

== Postwar ==
Baer continued to fly postwar. In late 1919, he became a member of the American Flying Club and tried to raise a squadron of fifteen American aviation combat veterans to form a "Pulaski Squadron" to support the Polish drive for independence. Baer foresaw his role as commanding the unit with the rank of major. He claimed to have Paderewski's support for his efforts. (The Polish Air Force did have the Polish 7th Air Escadrille a.k.a. "Kościuszko Squadron" of US volunteers.)

Baer went on to forge a career in civil aviation. By 1927, he was a Department of Commerce aeronautics inspector in San Antonio, Texas. He then spent about a year flying as a commercial pilot in South America.

Baer died in an aircraft accident in Shanghai on 9 December 1930. He was taking off in a floatplane with a Russian woman as his passenger. Baer's plane struck the mast of a junk on the Yangtze River and crashed. He was believed to have about 3,500 flight hours experience when he died. He is buried in Lindenwood Cemetery at Fort Wayne.

== Honors and awards ==
- Distinguished Service Cross (DSC) Action Date: March 11, 1918

The Distinguished Service Cross is presented to Paul Frank Baer, First Lieutenant (Air Service), U.S. Army, for extraordinary heroism on March 11, 1918. First Lieutenant Baer attacked, alone, a group of seven enemy pursuit machines, destroying one, which fell near the French lines northeast of Reims, France. On March 16, 1918, he attacked two enemy two-seaters, one of which fell in flames in approximately the same region.

- Distinguished Service Cross (DSC) Oak Leaf Cluster Action Dates: April 5, 12, & 23, and May 8 & 21, 1918

The Distinguished Service Cross is presented to Paul Frank Baer, First Lieutenant (Air Service), U.S. Army, for extraordinary heroism in action. First Lieutenant Baer brought down enemy planes on April 5, 12, and 23, 1918, and on May 8, 1918. First Lieutenant Baer destroyed two German machines, and on May 21, 1918, he destroyed his eighth enemy plane.

- Légion d'honneur (France)
- Croix de Guerre (France)
- Fort Wayne Air National Guard Base and Fort Wayne International Airport were originally named Baer Field

== See also ==
- List of World War I flying aces from the United States

== Bibliography ==
- Shores, Christopher F.; Franks, Norman & Guest, Russell F. (1990). Above the Trenches: a Complete Record of the Fighter Aces and Units of the British Empire Air Forces 1915–1920. London, UK: Grub Street. ISBN 978-0-948817-19-9.
- American Aces of World War I. Norman Franks, Harry Dempsey. Osprey Publishing, 2001. ISBN 1-84176-375-6, ISBN 978-1-84176-375-0.
