= Frank Kerr Hays =

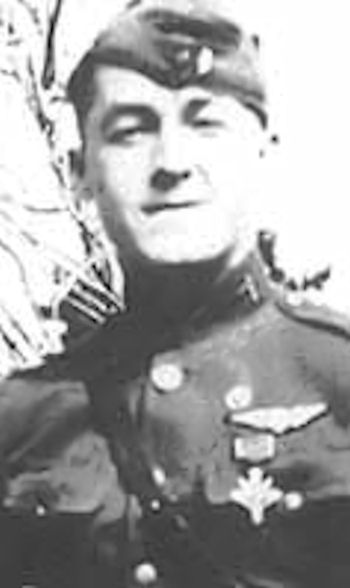
- Frank Kerr Hays. 1918
- Born: November 3, 1896; Louisville, Kentucky, US
- Died: February 29, 1988 (aged 91); Monterey, California, US
- Military career
- Allegiance: United States
- Branch: United States Army Air Service
- Rank: Lieutenant
- Unit: 13th Aero Squadron
- Conflicts: World War I
- Awards: Distinguished Service Cross

Lieutenant Frank Kerr Hays was a flying ace credited with six aerial victories during World War I.

Hays was born to Charles and Bertha (Snider) Hays on November 3, 1896, in Louisville, Kentucky. Hays was living in Chicago when he joined the U.S. Army Air Service. He reported to the 13th Aero Squadron on August 29, 1918, at the age of 21. On September 13, he won his first three victories in a melee in which he continued his attack after his guns jammed. He cleared them in time to rescue his Flight Commander from enemy attack. The feat earned him a Distinguished Service Cross (which can be seen on his portrait photo). Hays would score three more times, his last win coming one week before the armistice ended the war.

Hays married Beulah Stevens on March 29, 1924, in Chicago. They had two children, Frank Jr. and Joyce. Hays died on February 29, 1988, in Monterey, California. He is buried at Arlington National Cemetery.

== See also ==
- List of World War I flying aces from the United States
