= Charles J. Biddle (aviator) =

American aviator, attorney, and author

Charles John Biddle
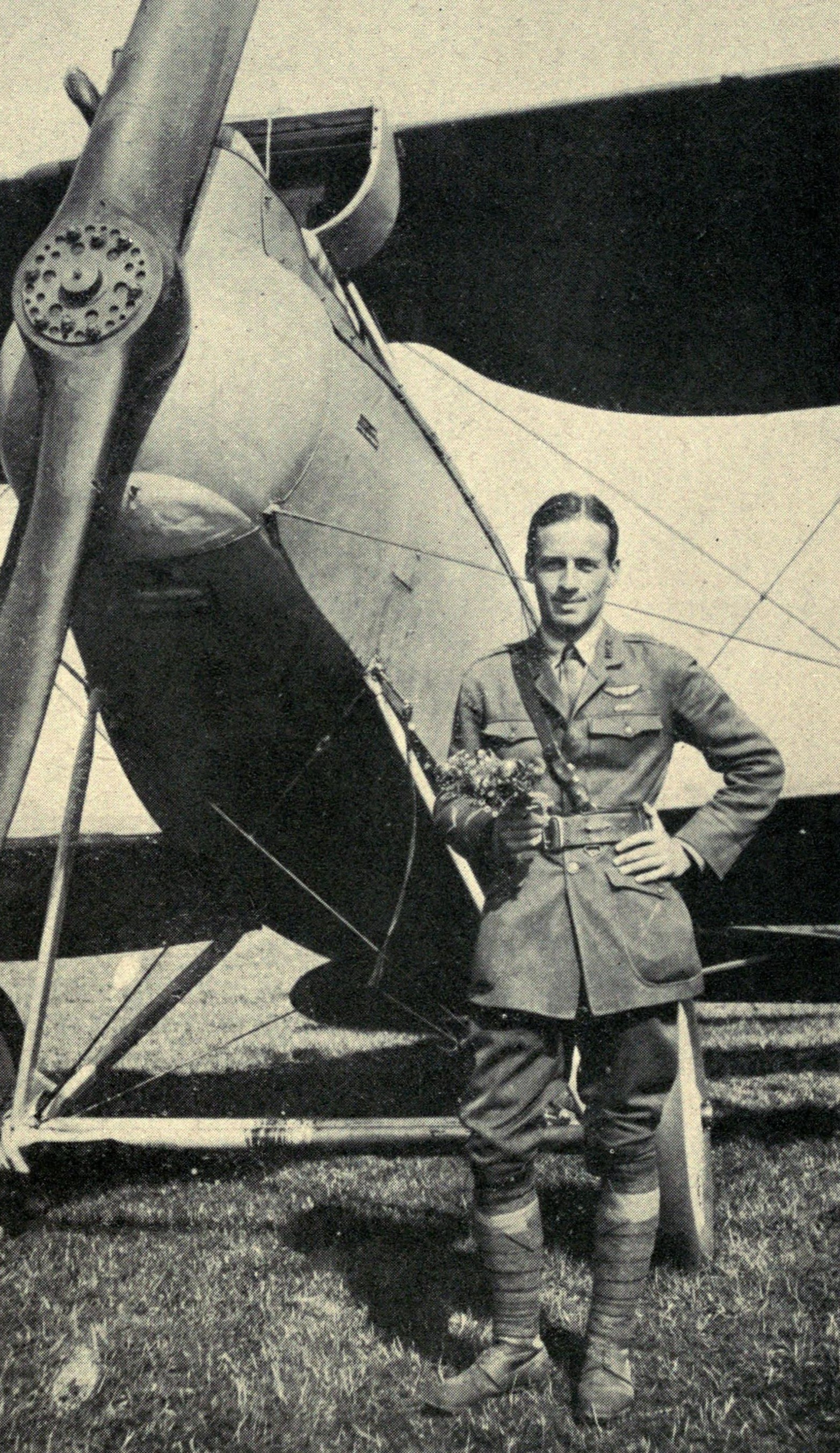
- Charles J. Biddle, 1918
- Born: 13 May 1890; Andalusia, Pennsylvania, US
- Died: 22 March 1972 (aged 81); Andalusia, Pennsylvania, US
- Military career
- Allegiance: United States
- Branch: Aéronautique Militaire (France); Air Service, United States Army
- Service years: 1917 - 1919
- Rank: Major
- Units: Aéronautique Militaire: Escadrille N.124 (Lafayette Escadrille); Escadrille SPA.73; Air Service, United States Army: 13th Aero Squadron; 103d Aero Squadron
- Commands: 13th Aero Squadron
- Conflicts: World War I
- Awards: Legion of Honor, Croix de Guerre, Distinguished Service Cross, Order of Leopold II
- Other work: Influential litigator and attorney

Major Charles John Biddle (13 May 1890 – 22 March 1972) was an American aviator, attorney, and author. He was a flying ace during World War I. Postwar, he launched a career in law and wrote his memoirs.

== Family and early life ==
Charles John Biddle was born on 13 May 1890 at Andalusia, the Biddle family estate near Philadelphia. His father was Charles Biddle (1857–1923) and mother was Letitia Glenn. His grandfather Charles John Biddle (1819–1873) was a soldier in the Union Army and subsequently a member of the United States House of Representatives. Andalusia was the estate of his great-grandfather, banker Nicholas Biddle (1786–1844). He was an hereditary member of the Aztec Club of 1847.

He graduated from Princeton University in 1911, and from Harvard Law School three years later. He was admitted to the Pennsylvania Bar, but interrupted his nascent career to serve in World War I.

== World War I service ==
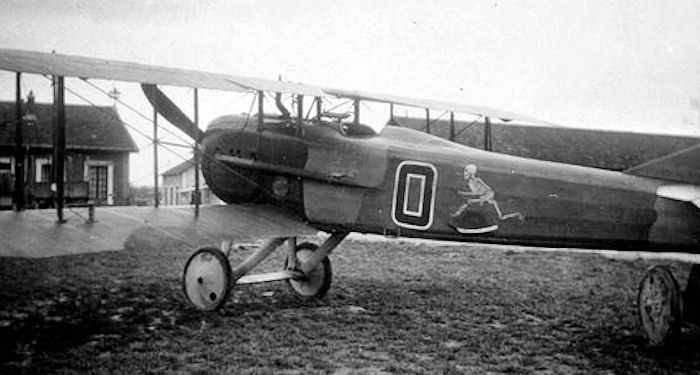
Major Biddle's 13th Aero Squadron SPAD S.XII "cannon fighter", 1918.

Biddle joined the Lafayette Flying Corps in France on 8 April 1917. He was assigned to Escadrille 73 as a private on 28 July 1917, under the command and mentorship of Albert Deullin. He was promoted to corporal on 2 June and to sergeant on 1 December. Biddle initially fought several indecisive combats with a Spad VII, but success evaded him until 5 December 1917. Flying a SPAD XIII, he downed the Albatros two-seater of Leutnants Fritz Pauly and Ernst Sauter of FFA 45 despite a malfunction by both his Spad's machine guns.

Biddle transferred to the American 103rd Aero Squadron on 10 January 1918 and was commissioned as a captain in the Aviation Section of the U.S. Army Signal Corps on 12 January 1918. He then reverted to the Spad VII for his 12 April win over a Halberstadt CL.II over Corbeny. He moved on to the 13th Aero Squadron (nicknamed "The Devil's Own Grim Reapers").

On 1 August, he shared his first two victories with William Howard Stovall, John Seerly, and H. B. Freeman. He shot down three more enemy planes afterwards-his 5th official credit was a Rumpler CIV of Fliegerabteilung 46LB {pilot Eichler {POW} observer Gröschel {DOW} August 16, 1918. He was at one point entrusted with the only SPAD XII issued to Americans. He was promoted to the rank of major on 1 November and was given command of the 4th Pursuit Group. He returned to the United States on 19 December and was discharged from the Army on 25 January.

In recognition of his service, the French awarded him both the Legion of Honor and the Croix de Guerre, and he received the American Distinguished Service Cross and the Belgian Order of Leopold II.

After the war, Biddle wrote a book entitled The Way of the Eagle.

== Legal career ==
Biddle initially practiced law in the Drexel Building with his father's firm. Following his father's death, he joined the law firm of Drinker Biddle & Reath (not using that name at the time) in 1924. He was the firm's first lateral partner and brought clients that included the Philadelphia Contributionship for the Insurance of Houses from Loss by Fire (founded by Benjamin Franklin) and the Philadelphia Savings Fund Society. Biddle became a partner in 1925 and was a major force at the firm for decades. In the 1950s, he led the defense of Merck Sharp & Dohme in a major case concerning price-fixing. At a trial in Trenton, New Jersey, he argued successfully for Merck's acquittal with Thomas E. Dewey who represented Eli Lilly.

Biddle also sued the U. S. government on behalf of three widows who lost their husbands in a B-29 Superfortress crash in 1948. This case was the first in which the government claimed national security privileges for its documents, as the B-29 was carrying out experiments with radar control of airborne drones. The case was settled without the government production of documents. In 2003, partner Wilson M. Brown III used the Charles Biddle case to establish a precedent to reopen a case on behalf of the survivors of the scientists killed in a 1948 B-29 crash. The US government still claimed national security for its defense. The U. S. Supreme Court examined its own prior decision of the case; the government claim was exposed as a fraudulent one used to cover up neglect in maintenance and poor air crew training as the cause of the accident.

He died in 1972.

== Honors and awards ==
Distinguished Service Cross (DSC) citation

The Distinguished Service Cross is presented to Charles John Biddle, Captain (Air Service), U.S. Army, for extraordinary heroism in action in the region of Damvillers, France, September 26, 1918. During an engagement between 11 Spads and 12 enemy Fokkers, Captain Biddle, perceiving a comrade in distress from the attack of two planes, dived upon them and by his fire forced them to withdraw. His prompt action saved the life of his comrade, who was in imminent danger of being shot to the ground. (General Orders No. 60, W.D., 1920)

Ordre de Léopold citation

For extraordinary heroism in action on 12 April 1918 near Corbeny, France, and on 15 May 1918, near Ypres, Belgium. Captain Biddle has daily shown himself courageous and skilled, leading his pilots to the attack at every opportunity and making his flight efficient. On 12 April, he attacked and destroyed an enemy two-seater which crashed between the trenches at Corbeny. On 15 May, while leading his patrol, he attacked, at very low altitude and far within the enemy lines, an enemy two-seater, killing the observer and forcing him down. A few minutes later he engaged a second enemy plane at very close range. Wounded in his leg, his plane and motor riddled, Captain Biddle was forced to land in 'No Man's Land' less than 70 yards from the German trenches in the region of Ypres. With remarkable courage and presence of mind and despite his wound, he detached himself from his smashed machine and made his way from shell hole under intense artillery, machine gun and rifle fire, to an advanced British Observation post.

French Croix de Guerre citation, 4 June 1918

Pilot of marvelous spirit. Attacked two enemy two-seaters successfully behind their lines, probably shooting down the first. Wounded and disabled in the course of the second combat, by sheer strength he succeeded in landing in no man's land and after passing the day in a shell hole, by night he got back to the Allied trenches.

== See also ==
- List of World War I flying aces from the United States
- 103rd Aero Squadron
