= Murray Kenneth Guthrie =

World War I flying ace (1896–1985)

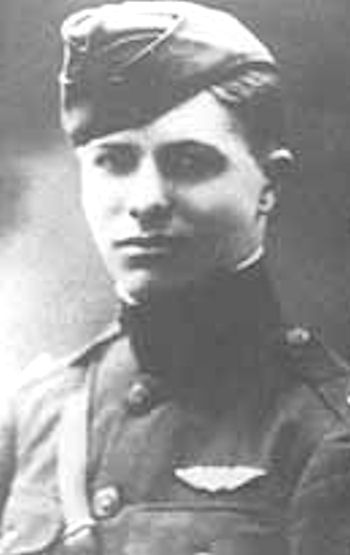
- Murray Kenneth Guthrie, 1918
- Born: May 29, 1896; Minneapolis, Minnesota, U.S.
- Died: May 21, 1985 (aged 88); Lometa, Texas, U.S.
- Military career
- Allegiance: United States
- Branch: Air Service, United States Army
- Service years: 1917–1918
- Rank: First Lieutenant
- Unit: Air Service, United States Army: 13th Aero Squadron
- Conflicts: World War I
- Awards: Distinguished Service Cross with two Oak Leaf Clusters

Lieutenant Murray Kenneth Guthrie was a World War I flying ace credited with six aerial victories.

== Biography ==
Raised in Mobile, Alabama, Murray Kenneth Guthrie, was the son of K. R. Guthrie. He joined the United States Air Service in 1918. Deployed to France, he was assigned to the 13th Aero Squadron, flying SPAD XIII aircraft. Eventually becoming a flight commander, he was credited with downing six Fokker D.VIIs, becoming was the highest scoring ace in his squadron.

After the war, Guthrie returned to Minnesota where he co-founded an advertising agency, became an officer in a financial institution and started a food supplement company. In 1951, he moved to Texas and became a rancher.

== See also ==
- List of World War I flying aces from the United States

== Bibliography ==
- American Aces of World War I. Norman Franks, Harry Dempsey. Osprey Publishing, 2001. ISBN 1-84176-375-6, ISBN 978-1-84176-375-0.
