= 13th Aero Squadron =

WW1 division of the United States Army

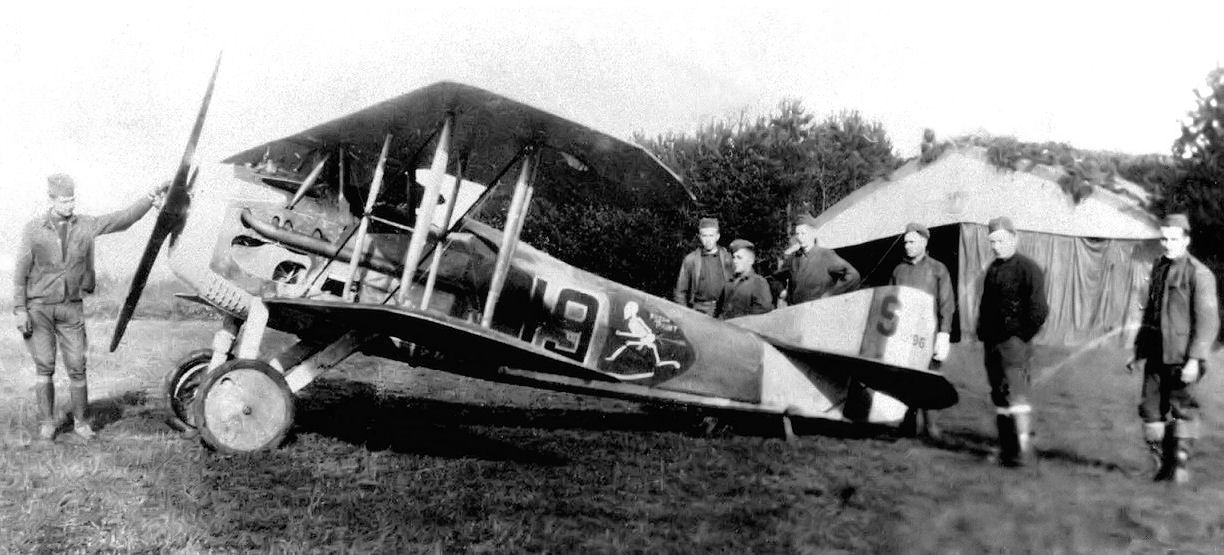
- 13th Aero Squadron – SPAD XIII assigned to Major Charles Biddle, likely taken at Souilly Airdrome, France, 1918
- Active: 14 June 1917 – 29 March 1919
- Country: United States
- Branch: United States Army Air Service
- Type: Squadron
- Role: Pursuit
- Part of: American Expeditionary Forces (AEF)
- Fuselage Code: "Grim Reapers"
- Engagements: World War I

Commanders
- Notable commanders: Captain (later Major) Charles J. Biddle; Lt. Dickinson Este

Insignia
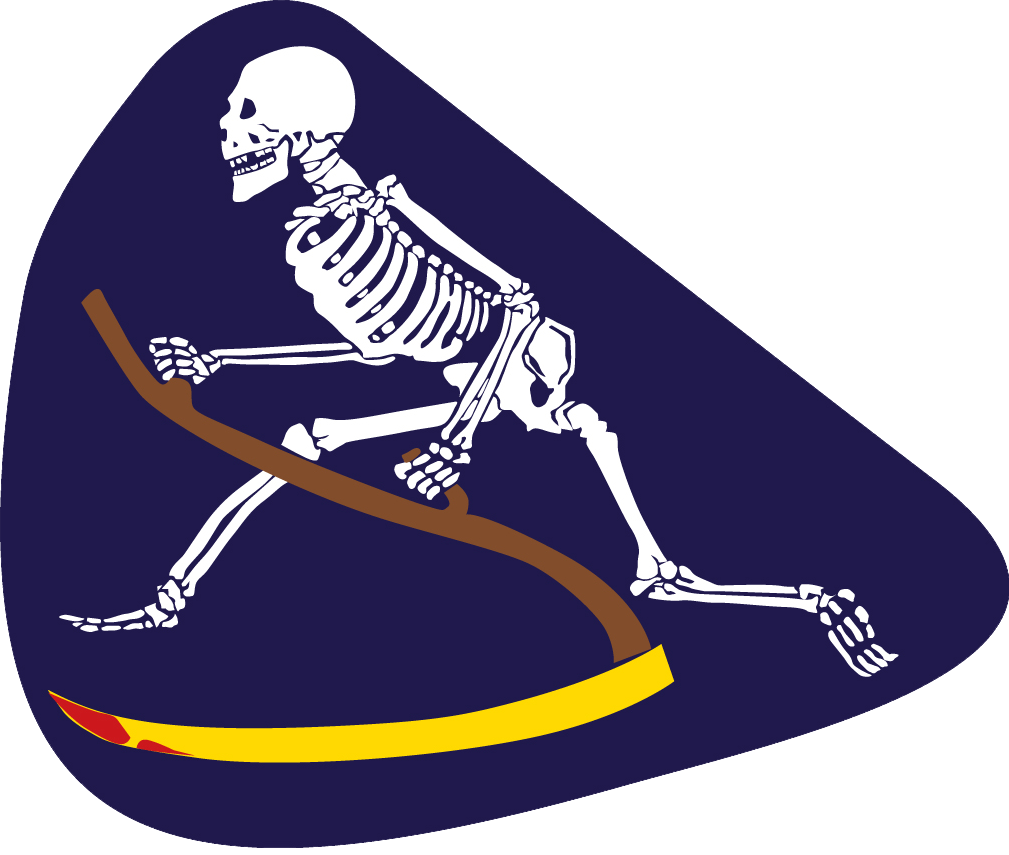
- 13th Aero Squadron Emblem "Grim Oscar"

Aircraft flown
- Fighter: SPAD XIII, 1918
- Trainer: Curtiss JN-4, 1917

Service record
- Operations: 2d Pursuit Group; Western Front, France: 28 June-11 November 1918: Sorties: 1,374; Combat missions: 179; Enemy combats: 89; Killed: 0; Wounded: 3; Missing: 12; Aircraft lost: 11
- Victories: Enemy Aircraft shot down: 29; Enemy Balloons shot down: 0; Total Enemy Aircraft Destroyed: 29; Air Aces: 7: Maj. Charles J. Biddle, 5 (4 shared)* * Biddle had a total of 7 aerial victories, one while serving with Spa73 of the French Air Service and 1 (with one other probable) with the 103d Aero Squadron before he joined the 13th Aero Squadron.; Lt Van H. Burgin; Lt Thomas Phillips Evans; Lt Murray K. Guthrie, 6 (4 shared); Lt Frank K. Hayes, 6 (4 shared); Lt John J. Seerley Jr., 5 (5 shared); Lt William H. Stovall, 6 (3 shared)

The 13th Aero Squadron was a United States Army Air Service unit that fought on the Western Front during World War I.

The squadron was assigned as a Day Pursuit (Fighter) Squadron as part of the 2d Pursuit Group, First United States Army. Its mission was to engage and clear enemy aircraft from the skies and provide escort to reconnaissance and bombardment squadrons over enemy territory. It also attacked enemy observation balloons, and perform close air support and tactical bombing attacks of enemy forces along the front lines. After the 1918 Armistice with Germany, the squadron returned to the United States in March 1919 and demobilized.

On 16 October 1936 the squadron was re-constituted, and consolidated with the United States Army Air Corps 13th Attack Squadron. Today, the current United States Air Force unit which holds its lineage and history is the 13th Bomb Squadron, assigned to the 509th Operations Group, Whiteman Air Force Base, Missouri.

== History ==
=== Origins ===
The 13th Aero Squadron was organised at Kelly Field, Texas on 14 June 1917. After a short period of organization, which included "snake-chasing and cactus-cutting", the squadron was moved to Wilbur Wright Field, Ohio in the beginning of July where its aviation cadets began flight training on the Curtiss JN-4 Jenny trainer. Training in Ohio lasted until 1 November when it received orders for overseas duty. The squadron proceeded to the Aviation Concentration Center, Garden City, New York, where it awaited transport to Europe. At the end of November, the squadron moved to Philadelphia, where it boarded the SS Northland, and departed the United States on 4 December. The ship arrived at Liverpool, England on 25 December where the same day, they boarded a train for Winchester, England where they were temporarily assigned to a Rest Camp. After a cross-channel crossing from Southampton to Le Havre, France, the squadron boarded a French train south, arriving at the Air Service Replacement Concentration Barracks in St. Maixent, 1 January 1918.

At St. Maixent the squadron waited for several weeks and largely performed construction and other activities designed to improve the newly established base. At the end of January, orders were received to proceed to the 3d Air Instructional Center at Issoudun Aerodrome for advanced flight and air combat training. For the next four months the squadron trained at Issodun, with detachments sent to French Air Force gunnery ranges at Meucon and Haussimont Aerodromes. Finally, in the beginning of June, training was completed and the squadron moved to the 1st Air Depot at Colombey-les-Belles Airdrome where the 13th Aero Squadron was classified as a Pursuit Squadron and received French SPAD XIII aircraft. Once equipped the squadron was ordered to Croix de Metz Aerodrome, near Toul, in the "Zone of Advance". There the 13th received its combat assignment to the 2d Pursuit Group where it joined the 22d, 49th and 139th Aero Squadrons.

=== Combat in France ===
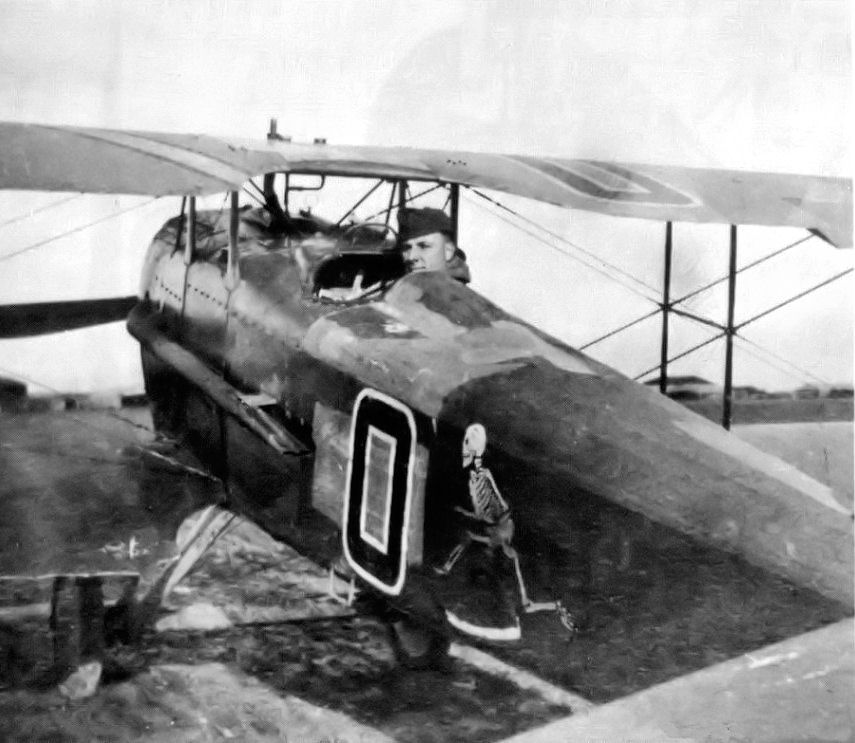
13th Aero Squadron – SPAD XII

Insignia of Jasta 18, a main German opponent of the 13th in September 1918

The 13th was charged with protection of the St. Mihiel sector, and its pilots soon were active in intercepting and attacking enemy aircraft that attempted reconnaissance over Allied lines. The Spads also escorted Allied observation planes deep into enemy territory where their pilots sometimes engaged enemy planes and attacked hostile balloons.

While participating in the St. Mihiel Offensive, which was undertaken to eliminate the salient in the front lines around St. Mihiel that had existed since early in the war, the 13th fought with vigor. While ground forces were attacking and destroying, men, material, and morale, the 13th's pilots kept busy destroying enemy aircraft and balloons, and making the sky safe for Allied observation planes. The squadron suffered its first combat loss on 13 September when Lt. Robert Converse was shot down on a late afternoon patrol and reported missing in action. On 14 September 1918 a squadron-strength patrol led by Charles Biddle was ambushed by a flight of the red and white Fokker D VII aircraft of Jasta 18, led by Leutnant der Reserve August Raben, one of a number of times the same two opposing squadrons would meet before the Armistice, starting with the aerial action over the St. Mihiel salient. Six original squadron members were downed in a matter of minutes: Lt. Charles Drew, Lt Alton Brody, Lt. Van H. Burgin, Lt. Thomas Phillips Evans, Lt. Harry B. "Buck" Freeman and Lt. George P. Kull. Lts. Burgin, Converse, Drew, Evans, Freeman and Brody were captured and repatriated after the Armistice. George Kull was confirmed killed in action, the first combat fatality of the 13th Aero Squadron.

The Meuse-Argonne campaign was launched on 26 September 1918 to further reduce the St. Mihiel salient. The 13th Aero Squadron moved on 23 September to Belrain Aerodrome, and from there inflicted heavy losses upon enemy aircraft and balloons. As its pilots gained domination of the air, their responsibilities were expanded to include protection of ground forces, strafing of enemy troops and bombing of targets that could be observed within enemy lines. During the Meuse Argonne Offensive, the squadron lost Lts. Gerald D. Stivers, Henry Guion Armstrong, Clarence A. Brodie and Robert H. Stiles killed in action.

On 7 November, the squadron moved to Souilly Aerodrome and continued combat operations until the Armistice with Germany was signed and combat ended on 11 November 1918.

The 13th claimed several "aces" from this period of its history: Charles J Biddle, Van H. Burgin, Thomas Phillips Evans, Murray K Guthrie, Frank K Hays, John J Seerley, and William H Stovall.
Major Carl Spaatz, although on orders to return home, sought and received permission to serve with the 13th Aero Squadron as a pursuit pilot. He subordinated himself to men of lower rank, but as a result of his ardent zeal and ability, he was soon a flight leader and was credited with destroying two Fokkers during the St. Mihiel and Meuse-Argonne Offensive. and is also credited with an out of control enemy aircraft.

=== Demobilization ===
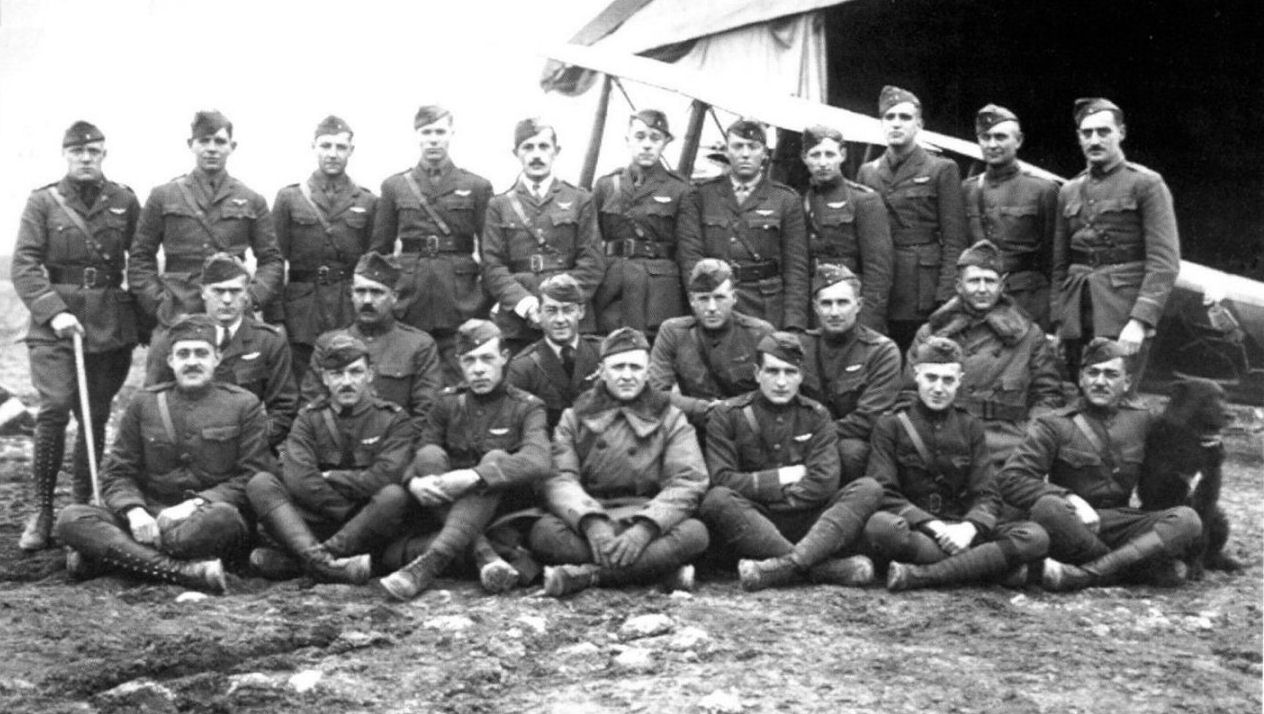
Squadron photo after the Armistice, November 1918

After the armistice, the squadron remained at Souilly until 16 December 1918 when orders were received from First Army for the squadron to report to the 1st Air Depot, Colombey-les-Belles Airdrome to turn in all of its supplies and equipment and was relieved from duty with the AEF. The squadron's SPAD aircraft were delivered to the Air Service American Air Service Acceptance Park No. 1 at Orly Aerodrome to be returned to the French. There practically all of the pilots and observers were detached from the squadron.

Personnel at Colombey were subsequently assigned to the commanding general, services of supply, and ordered to report to the staging camp at Le Mans, France. There, personnel awaited scheduling to report to one of the Base Ports in France for transport to the United States and subsequent demobilization. From 6 February to 3 March 1919, the squadron was at the port of Brest before crossing the Atlantic aboard the SS America. From 13 to 29 March 1919 the squadron was at Mitchell Field, New York, where it was demobilized. It remained inactive until it was reconstituted in 1936.

=== Lineage ===
- Organized as 13th Aero Squadron on 14 June 1917

Re-designated: 13th Aero Squadron (Pursuit), on 28 June 1918
Demobilized on 29 March 1919.

=== Assignments ===
- Post Headquarters, Kelly Field, 14 June 1917
- Post Headquarters, Wilbur Wright Field, 8 July 1917
- Aviation Concentration Center, 1 November 1917
- Winchester Rest Camp, England, 26 December 1917
- Le Havre Rest Camp, France, 27 December 1917
- Replacement Concentration Center, AEF, France, 1 January 1918
- 3d Air Instructional Center, 26 January 1918
- 1st Air Depot, 5 June 1918
- 2d Pursuit Group, 28 June 1918
- 1st Air Depot, AEF, 16 December 1918
- Commanding General, Services of Supply, 6 February-3 March 1919
- Eastern Department, 13–29 March 1919

=== Stations ===
- Kelly Field, Texas, 14 June 1917
- Wilbur Wright Field, Ohio, 8 July 1917
- Aviation Concentration Center, Garden City, New York, 1 November-3 December 1917
- Port of Entry, Hoboken, New Jersey

Overseas transport: SS Northland, 4–25 December 1917

- Liverpool, England, 25 December 1917
- Winchester, England, 26 December 1917
- Le Havre, France, 30 December 1917
- St. Maixent Replacement Barracks, France, 1 January 1918
- Issoudun Aerodrome, France, 27 January 1918

Detachment at: Meucon Aerodrome, France, 6 April-c. 11 May 1918
Detachment at: Haussimont Aerodrome, France, c. 11 May-c. 24 June 1918

- Colombey-les-Belles Airdrome, France, 5 June 1918
- Croix de Metz Aerodrome (Toul), France, 28 June 1918
- Belrain Aerodrome, France, 23 September 1918
- Souilly Aerodrome, France, 7 November 1918
- Colombey-les-Belles Airdrome, France, 16 December 1918
- Le Mans, France, 6 February 1919
- Port of Brest, France, 1 March 1919

Return transport: SS America, 3–13 March 1919

- Garden City, New York, 13–29 March 1919

=== Combat sectors and campaigns ===
Streamer	Sector/Campaign	Dates	Notes
	Toul Sector	10 August-11 September 1918	
	St. Mihiel Offensive Campaign	12–16 September 1918	
	Verdun Sector	17–22 September 1918	
	Meuse-Argonne Offensive Campaign	26 September-11 November 1918	

=== Notable personnel ===
- Maj. Carl Spaatz, DSC, 3 aerial victories
- Cpt. Charles J. Biddle, DSC, air ace
- Lt. Charles W. Drew, DSC, POW, 1 aerial victory
- Lt. J. Dickinson Este, DSC, 4 aerial victories
- Lt. Murray K. Guthrie, DSC (3x), air ace
- Lt. Frank K. Hays, DSC, SSC, air ace
- Lt. William H. Stovall, DSC, air ace
- Lt. Thomas Phillips Evans, POW, air ace
- Lt. Van H. Burgin, POW, air ace
- Lt John J. Seerley Jr., 5 aerial victories, air ace

DSC: Distinguished Service Cross; SSC: Silver Star Citation; POW: Prisoner of War

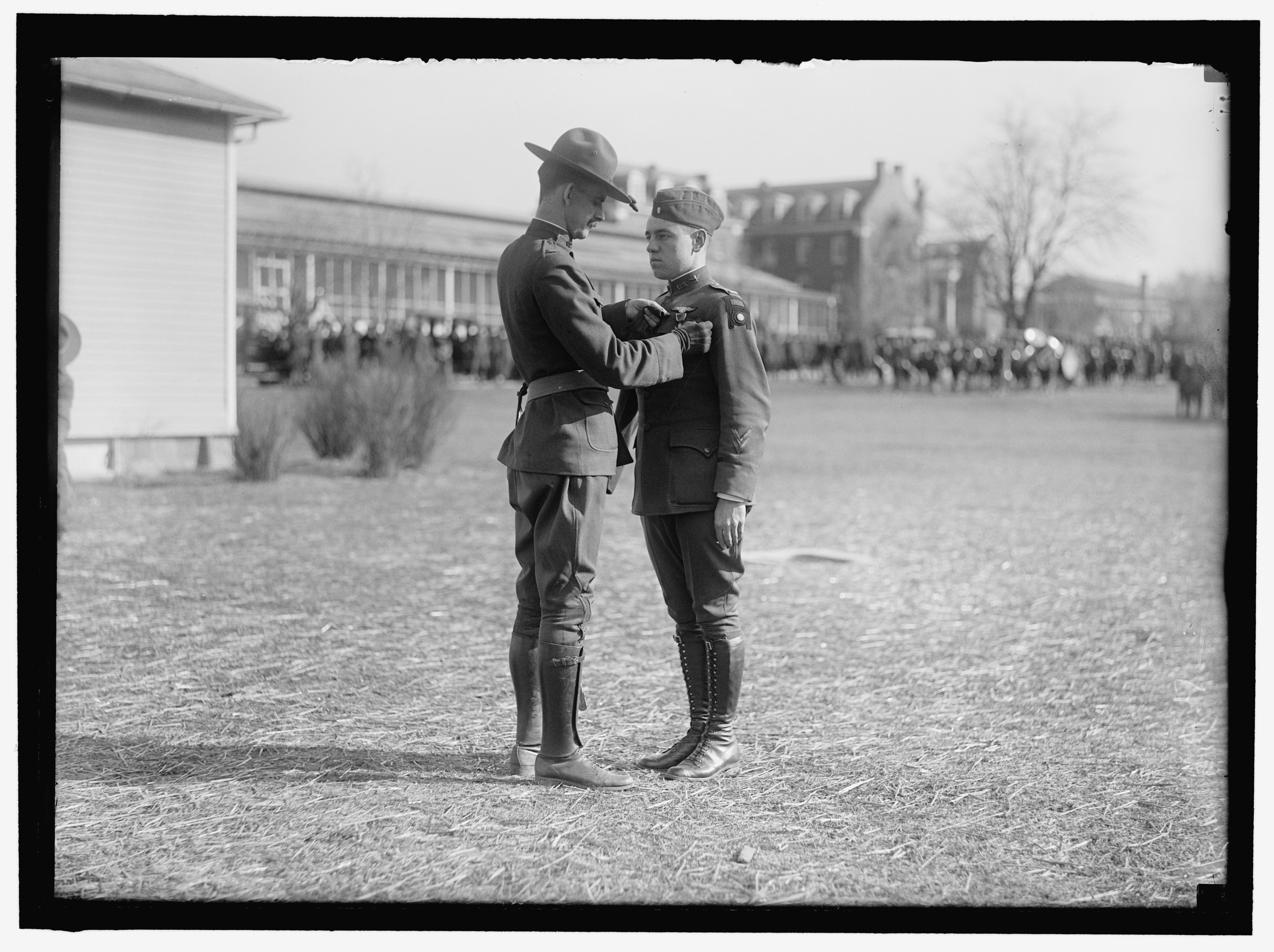
Drew receiving his Distinguished Service Cross

== See also ==
- Organization of the Air Service of the American Expeditionary Force
- List of American aero squadrons
