= 103rd Aero Squadron =

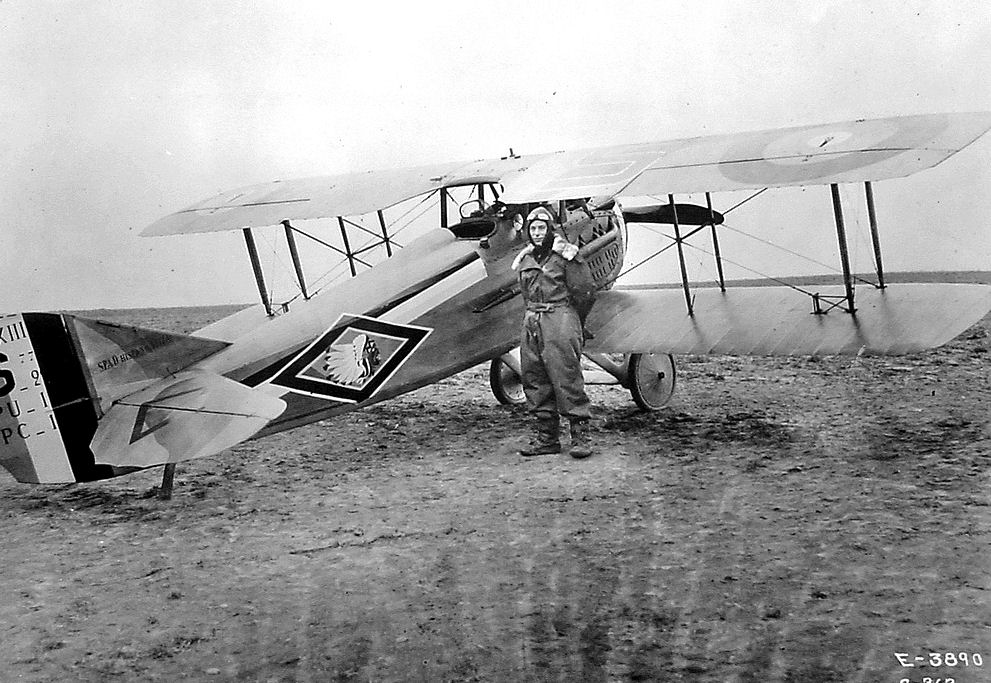
- 103rd Aero Squadron - SPAD Spad XIII C.1 of Capt. Robert Soubiran, 103rd Aero Squadron, Serial # S7714.
- Active: 1917-19
- Country: United States
- Allegiance: United States Army Air Service
- Type: Squadron
- Role: Pursuit
- Size: 24 officers, 150 men, 24 aircraft
- Part of: American Expeditionary Forces
- Garrison/HQ: France
- Engagements: World War I

- Decorations: French Croix de Guerre with Two Palms; French Fourragere

Commanders
- Notable commanders: Maj. William Thaw II

Insignia
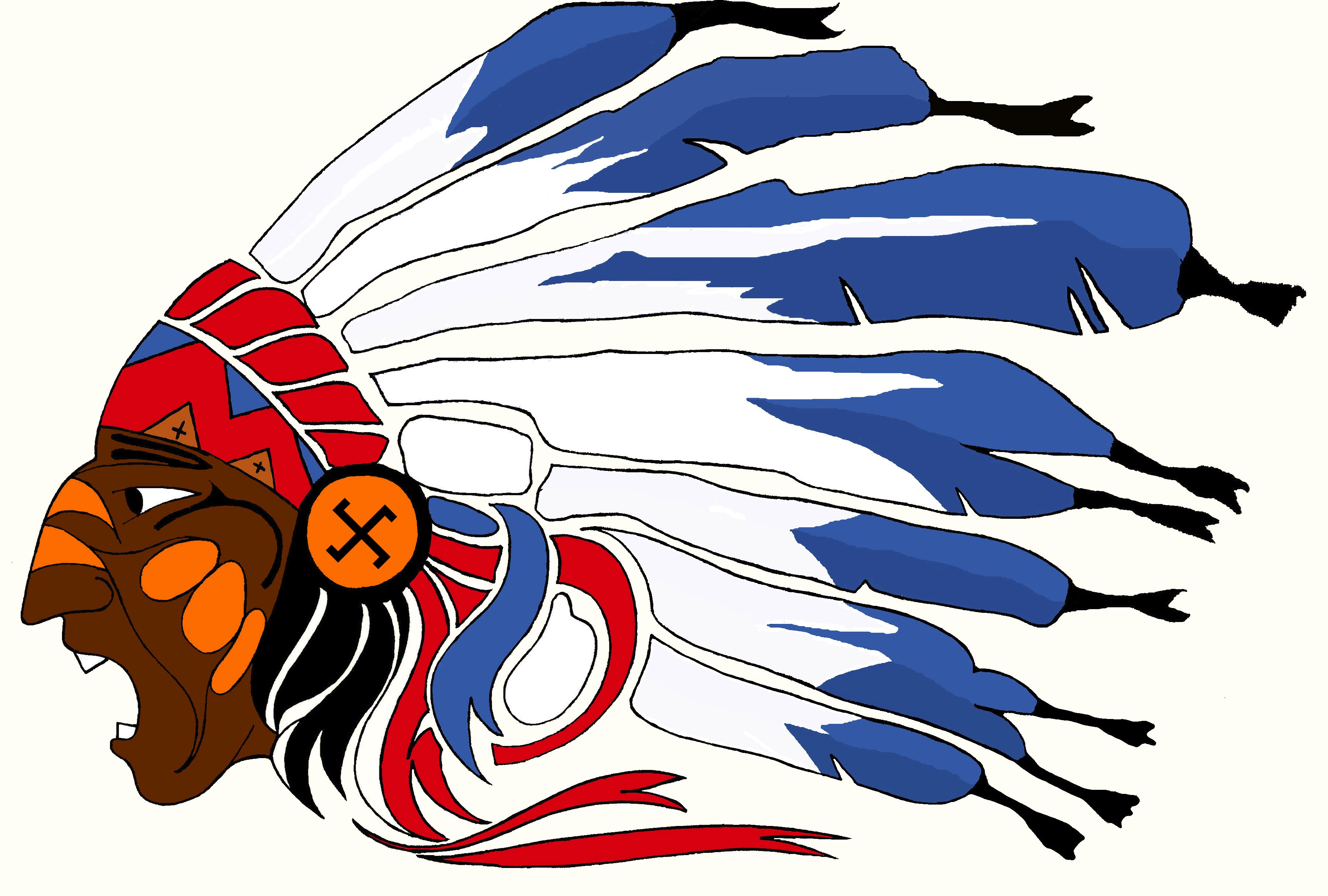
- Squadron insignia of the Lafayette Escadrille which was brought forward to the 103rd Aero Squadron

Aircraft flown
- Fighter: Spad VII, 1918; Spad XIII, 1918

Service record
- Operations: French Air Service; 3rd Pursuit Group; Western Front, France: 18 February – 11 November 1918
- Victories: Enemy aircraft shot down: 49; Enemy balloons shot down: 2; Total enemy aircraft destroyed: 51

The 103rd Aero Squadron was an aviation pursuit squadron of the U.S. Air Service that served in combat in France during World War I. Its original complement included pilots from the disbanded Lafayette Escadrille and Lafayette Flying Corps. One of those pilots, Paul F. Baer, became the first ace of an American unit in World War I. (Note: See note below. Baer's fifth victory, as recognized by the Air Force Historical Research Agency, occurred 23 April, more than a month before the fifth of Douglas Campbell. Campbell at that date still had only a single victory.)

The 103rd Aero Squadron was the first U.S. pursuit squadron in action during World War I and had the longest combat service, from 19 February to 11 November 1918. It earned six battle participation credits, flew 470 combat missions, engaged in 327 combats, destroyed 45 German aircraft in aerial combat and claimed an additional 40 as probably destroyed, shot down two balloons, flew 3,075 hours over the front lines, and dropped 4,620 pounds of bombs. Its casualties were five killed in action, two killed in flying accidents, four prisoners of war, three wounded in action, and one injured in a forced landing.

The commander of the 1st Pursuit Wing, in general orders, said of the 103rd:

"In February last the Lafayette Escadrille of the French Army was transferred to the 103rd Aero Squadron, United States Army. It was the first, and for nearly two months it was the only American Air Service organization on the front. Since that time it is not too much to say that pilots who served in this squadron have formed the backbone of American Pursuit Aviation on the front...No task was too arduous or too hazardous for it to perform successfully. In the recent decisive operations of the First American Army the 103rd Aero Squadron has done its share." – Lt. Col. Burt M. Atkinson, 16 November 1918

The history and lineage of the 103rd Aero Squadron continues as part of the 94th Fighter Squadron of the United States Air Force.

== History ==
The 103rd Aero Squadron was organized on 31 August 1917 at Kelly Field, Texas, where its enlisted members, drawn from other units, trained until being moved to Garden City, New York for preparation for overseas movement. On 23 November 1917 the unit sailed on board the RMS Baltic from its port of embarkation at New York City. The Baltic joined a convoy at Halifax, Nova Scotia and arrived at Liverpool on 7 December 1917. Because of a measles outbreak, it was quarantined at Winnall Down Camp outside Winchester until 23 December 1917, when it proceeded to France through Southampton and Le Havre. The squadron arrived at Issoudun on 28 December 1917, where it spent the month of January constructing hangars for the instructional school being built there. On 1 February it resumed training for combat at the front.

On 11 February 1918 Major William Thaw, formerly with the Lafayette Escadrille, took command of the 103rd Squadron at the Ferme de La Noblette, near La Cheppe, followed on 18 February by the assignment of 17 former pilots of the Lafayette Escadrille and Lafayette Flying Corps. (Note: later in 1918 the AEF standardized the Table of Organization and Equipment for pursuit squadrons at 18 pilots and 25 aircraft) Combat operations began almost immediately in early March, using Spad VII fighters, and flying with the newly formed Groupe de Combat 21 (21st Pursuit Group) of the Aéronautique Militaire in support of the French 4th Army, and the squadron recorded its first aerial victory on 11 March.

At La Noblette, the squadron was relieved by another French Escadrille and moved west on 10 April to the Reims area, in support of the French 6th Army, then north to the coast of the North Sea at Leffrinckoucke on 2 May, to support the French Detachment of Army of the North until 29 June. While at Leffrinckoucke its airdrome was subjected to frequent air attacks, and it received a citation 22 October 1918 from the commander in chief of the French Armies of the North and Northeast for its "brilliance" in operations in the face of adversity.

The display of its distinctive "Indian Head" insignia from the Lafayette Escadrille was authorized by the Chief of Air Service AEF, Brig. Gen. Benjamin Foulois, on 6 May 1918. Two days later 1st Lt. Paul F. Baer shot down two German airplanes to become the first ace of an American unit. (Note: Baer's kills were on 11 March, 16 March, 6 April, 12 April, 23 April (half), 8 May (two), 21 May (one quarter), and 22 May. AFHRA credits him with nine victories. (Gorrell's History, Series E (Squadron Histories) Volume 16, Part 1 Sheet 13)) By mid-May the 103rd was the leading American pursuit squadron, with half of the AEF's 28 aerial victories. Baer was the sole ace of the AEF, with nearly one-third of all victories, but he was shot down in a fight with eight Albatros D.Va fighters of the Leutnant der Reserve August Raben-led Jasta 18 near Laventie on 22 May, after Gefreiter Deberitz of Jasta 18 severed the flight control cables of Baer's SPAD VII with the gunfire from his Albatros, and Baer was captured following his crash, with only a broken knee as his sole injury.

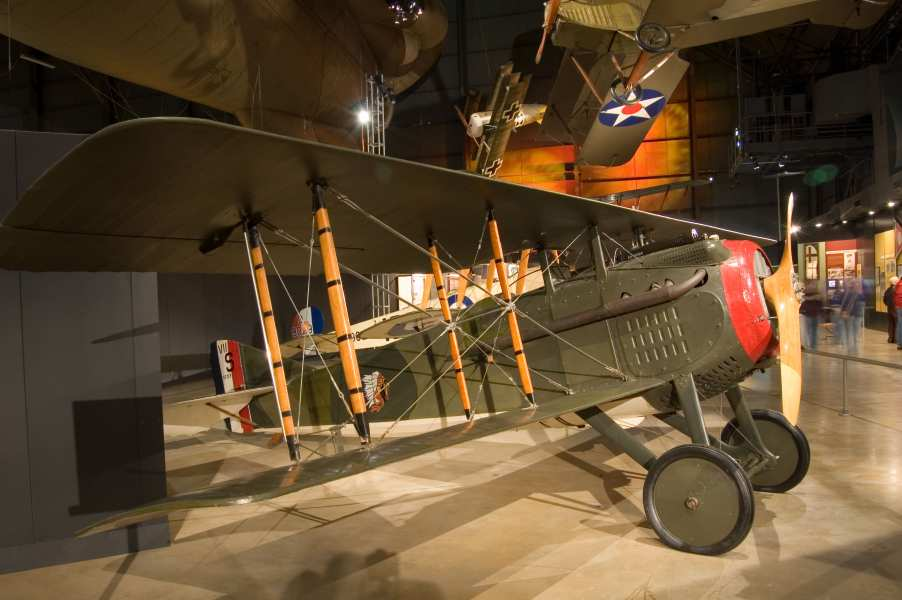
Spad VII displayed in livery of the 103rd Aero Squadron

On 4 July 1918 the squadron relocated to Toul and was assigned to an American command, the 2nd Pursuit Group. On 29 July Thaw moved up to command of the new 3rd Pursuit Group and was replaced by Lafayette Escadrille veteran Capt. Robert L. Rockwell. The 103rd relocated to Vaucouleurs in the Meuse department of France for operations with the 3rd Pursuit Group. In September the squadron shifted northwest to Lisle-en-Barrois to support the Meuse-Argonne Offensive. On 18 October, Capt. Robert Soubiran, another Escadrille veteran and a former member of the 103rd, returned to the squadron to take command. The squadron recorded its last aerial combat on 4 November near Montmédy, claiming three aircraft destroyed. At the hour of the armistice, the squadron had 21 Spad XIIIs and 21 pilots available for operations.

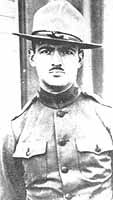
1st Lt. Frank Hunter

Three of the five pursuit groups operational at the end of the war were commanded by former pilots of the 103rd Aero Squadron, and ten other pilots were selected to command pursuit squadrons. (Note: Thaw, Biddle, and Hill commanded the 3rd, 4th and 5th Groups, respectively, while Soubiran (103rd), Rockwell (103rd), Marr (94th), Peterson (95th), Hill (138th), Bridgman (22nd), Biddle (13th), Baker (141st), Low (185th), and C. M. Jones (28th) received squadron commands.) 14 pilots received 21 awards of the French Croix de Guerre, and eight received 17 awards of the Distinguished Service Cross. Seven pilots were recognized as aces with five recording all their kills with the 103rd. Beginning 13 September 1918, 1st Lt. Frank O'D. Hunter shot down eight German aircraft in six weeks, tying Baer for the lead in squadron victories, for which he received five awards of the DSC and the Croix de Guerre with palm. Baer was released at the Armistice by the Germans and returned to the squadron. He submitted a claim for a kill occurring on the morning he was shot down, which was confirmed, and became the leading ace of the 103rd with nine victories.

After the armistice, the squadron was based at Foucaucourt and assigned to the First Army, alerted for possible occupation service with the Third Army. It received nine new pilots in early December, but was taken off operations on 14 December. The squadron's SPAD aircraft were delivered to the Air Service American Air Service Acceptance Park No. 1 at Orly Aerodrome to be returned to the French. There practically all of the pilots and observers were detached from the squadron. All of its pilots except four were transferred out of the squadron by 4 January 1919, and those four by 24 January.

The remainder of the squadron and its equipment followed by truck within a week. Soubiran turned over command to the squadron adjutant, 1st Lt. John P. Healy, at Colombey-les-Belles on 1 February 1919. Personnel at Colombey were moved to their port of embarkation at Brest and sailed to New York aboard the armored cruiser USS Frederick on 19 February 1919. The 103rd returned to Garden City to muster out its personnel, and became a unit on paper only by 18 March. It officially demobilized on 18 August 1919.

On 8 April 1924 the 103rd Aero Squadron was reconstituted and consolidated with the 94th Pursuit Squadron to maintain its history and lineage.

=== Lineage ===
- Organized as **103rd Aero Squadron** on 31 August 1917

Re-designated as: 103rd Aero Squadron (Pursuit), 13 February 1918
Absorbed American pilots of Escadrille de Lafayette (Aéronautique Militaire), 18 February 1918
Re-designated as: 103rd Aero Squadron, 4 March 1919

- Demobilized on 18 Aug 1919

=== Assignments ===
- Post Headquarters, Kelly Field, 31 August 1917
- Aviation Concentration Center, 5 November 1917
- 3rd Air Instructional Center, 28 December 1917
- Air Service Headquarters, AEF, 13 February 1918

Attached to Groupe de Combat 21, Fourth Army (France) 18 February 1918 – 10 April 1918
Attached to Sixth Army (France) 11 April 1918 to 30 April 1917
Attached to Army of the North (France) 31 April 1918 to 4 July 1918

- 2nd Pursuit Group, 4 July 1918
- 3rd Pursuit Group, 7 August 1918
- 1st Air Depot, 5 January 1919
- Commanding General, Services of Supply, 6–19 February 1919
- Eastern Department, 4 March – 18 Aug 1919

=== Stations ===
- Kelly Field, Texas, 31 August – 30 October 1917
- Aviation Concentration Center, Garden City, New York, 5 November 1917

Overseas transport: RMS Baltic, 23 November – 7 December

- Liverpool, England, 8 December
- Windall Downs Rest Camp, Winchester, England, 8 December
- Southampton, England, 23 December
- American Rest Camp, Le Havre, France, 24 December
- Issoudun Aerodrome, France, 28 December
- La Noblette Aerodrome, France, 13 Feb 1918
- Bonne Maison Aerodrome, France, 8 April 1918
- Leffrinckouke Aerodrome, France, 30 April 1918
- Crochte Aerodrome, France, 6 June 1918
- Gengault Aerodrome (Toul), France, 30 June 1918
- Vaucouleurs Aerodrome, France, 7 August 1918
- Lisle-en-Barrois Aerodrome, France, 20 September 1918
- Foucaucourt Aerodrome, France, 6 November 1918
- Colombey-les-Belles Airdrome, France, 5 January 1919
- Brest, France, 6–19 Feb 1919
- Garden City, New York, 4–18 Mar 1919
- Undetermined, 19 March – 18 Aug 1919

=== Combat sectors and campaigns ===
Streamer	Sector/Campaign	Dates	Notes
	Champagne Sector	19 February – 9 April 1918	
	Aisne sector	11–30 April 1918	
	Ypres-Lys sector, Belgium	2 May – 29 June 1918	
	Toul sector	5 July – 11 September 1918	
	St. Mihiel Offensive Campaign	12–16 September 1918	
	Meuse-Argonne Offensive Campaign	18 October – 11 November 1918	

=== Aces ===
- Maj. Gervais Raoul Lufbery, with a total of 17 aerial victories, until his death in combat
- Lt. Paul F. Baer, DSC, 9 (2 shared)
- Maj. Charles J. Biddle, 1 (1 probable)-Biddle had a total of 7 aerial victories, 1 while serving with Spa73 of the French Air Service, and 5 after being transferred to the 13th Aero Squadron.
- Lt. George W. Furlow, DSC, 5 (4 shared)
- Capt. Frank O'Driscoll Hunter, DSC, 9 (3 shared)
- Capt. G. DeFreest Larner, DSC, 5 (3 shared)- Larner a total of 7 aerial victories, 2 while serving with Spa86 of the French Air Service.
- Lt. William T. Ponder, DSC, 3 (2 shared- Ponder had a total of 6 aerial victories, 3 while serving with Spa163 of the French Air Service.
- LtCol. William Thaw II, DSC, 3 (2 shared)- Thaw had a total of 5 aerial victories, 2 (along with 2 probables) while serving with N.124 of the French Air Service.
- Lt. Edgar G. Tobin, DSC, 6 (2 shared, 1 probable)

=== Other personnel ===
- 1Lt. Stuart Emmet Edgar, died shortly after takeoff due to an engine malfunction
- Lt. Herbert B. Bartholf, DSC, 2 aerial victories
- Lt. Warren E. Eaton, DSC, 1 aerial victory [Founder Soaring Society of America]
- Lt. John Frost, DSC, 2 aerial victories
- Cpt. Christopher W. Ford, DSC, 3 aerial victories
- Lt. Ernest A. Giroux, DSC (KIA)
- Cpt. James Norman Hall, DSC, 3 aerial victories
- Lt. Warren T. Hobbs, SSC (KIA)
- Lt. Livingston G. Irving, DSC, 1 aerial victory
- Lt. Eugene B. Jones, SSC (KIA)
- Cpt. Richard C. M. Page, DSC, 2 aerial victories
- Lt. Percy R. Pyne, DSC, 1 aerial victory
- Lt. John I. Rancourt, DSC, 1 aerial victory
- Lt. Joseph Waddell, SSC

DSC: Distinguished Service Cross; SSC: Silver Star Citation; KIA: killed in action

=== Officers assigned during hostilities ===
Former members of Lafayette Flying Corps in italics; former members of Lafayette Escadrille in bold
A ♦ symbol indicates present for duty on 11 November 1918
Pilots

- 2nd Lt. William C. Appleton♦
- 1st Lt. Paul F. Baer (prisoner of war, ace)
- 1st Lt. Hobart A.H. Baker
- 1st Lt. Herbert B. Bartholf♦
- Capt. Charles J. Biddle (ace)
- **Capt. Ray C. Bridgman**
- 1st Lt. B. Drumond Cannon
- 1st Lt. Lawrence E. Cauffman♦
- 2nd Lt. Loran B. Cockrell♦
- Capt. Phelps Collins (Killed in flying accident)
- **1st Lt. Charles H. Dolan**
- **1st Lt. William E. Dugan Jr.**
- 1st Lt. Paul W. Eaton (Prisoner of war)
- 1st Lt. Warren E. Eaton♦
- 1st Lt. Stuart E. Edgar (Killed in flying accident)
- 2nd Lt. Clarence H. Faith♦
- **1st Lt. Christopher W. Ford** (Prisoner of war)
- 1st Lt. John Frost♦
- 1st Lt. George W. Furlow♦ (ace)
- 1st Lt. Ernest A. Giroux (Killed in action)
- **Capt. James N. Hall**
- **Capt. Dudley L. Hill**
- 1st Lt. Warren T. Hobbs (Killed in action)
- 1st Lt. Theodore H. Hubbard♦
- 1st Lt. Frank O'D. Hunter♦ (ace)
- 1st Lt. Livingston G. Irving♦
- 1st Lt. C. Maury Jones
- 1st Lt. Eugene B. Jones (Killed in action)
- **1st Lt. Henry S. Jones**
- 1st Lt. Hugo A. Kenyon♦
- 1st Lt. John O. Kirtland♦
- 1st Lt. John M. Koontz (Wounded in action)
- Capt. G. DeFreest Larner♦ (ace)
- 1st Lt. Alfred W. Lawson
- 1st Lt. Seth Low
- 2nd Lt. Wellford MacFadden Jr (Killed in action)
- 1st Lt. Dudley H. Manchester♦
- **Capt. Kenneth A. Marr**
- 1st Lt. Martin F. McQuilkin♦
- 1st Lt. Charles I. Merrick
- 1st Lt. Cord Meyer
- 1st Lt. Charles H. Monroe♦
- 1st Lt. Keene M. Palmer (Killed in action)
- 2nd Lt. Samuel H. Paris
- **Capt. David McK. Peterson**
- 1st Lt. William Ponder♦ (ace)
- 1st Lt. Percy R. Pyne♦
- 1st Lt. John F. Randall
- **Capt. Robert L. Rockwell**♦
- 1st Lt. William T. Rolph
- 1st Lt. Louis F. Schultze
- **Capt. Robert Soubiran**♦ (last wartime commanding officer)
- 1st Lt. McCrea Stephenson
- Capt. Edgar Tobin (ace)
- 1st Lt. Van Winkle Todd (Prisoner of war)
- 1st Lt. George E. Turnure
- 1st Lt. Joseph Waddell
- 1st Lt. Doyan Parsons Wardwell♦
- 1st Lt. Charles H. Willcox

Headquarters

- **Maj. William Thaw II**, Commanding Officer
- 1st Lt. Phocion S. Park, Adjutant
- 2nd Lt. George A. Orr, Adjutant
- 1st Lt. John P. Healy, Adjutant♦ (joined squadron 11 Nov 18)
- 1st Lt. Henry V. Bell, Operations Officer♦
- 1st Lt. Dan L. Perkins, Engineering Officer♦
- 1st Lt. Claudius H.M. Roberts, Armament Officer
- 2nd Lt. Edward H. Carman, Armament officer♦
- 2nd Lt. William H. Bleeker, Supply Officer
- 2nd Lt. Elwood S. Frymire, Supply Officer
- 2nd Lt. William B. Carill, Supply Officer
- 2nd Lt. Robert L.W. Owens, Supply officer
- 1st Lt. Rufus K. Goodenow, Supply Officer♦
- 1st Lt. Sigurd H. Kraft, Medical officer
- 1st Lt. Omer O. Gain, Medical Officer
- 1st Lt. Carroll D. Evans, Medical officer

== See also ==
- United States Army Air Service
- Organization of the Air Service of the American Expeditionary Force
- List of American Aero Squadrons
- Lafayette Flying Corps
- Lafayette Escadrille

== Notes ==
Footnotes

Citations
