= Frank O'Driscoll Hunter =

United States Army Air Forces general (1894–1982)

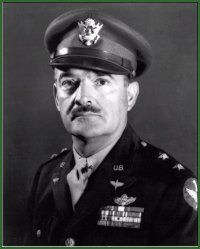
- Major General Frank O'Driscoll Hunter during World War II
- Born: December 8, 1894; Savannah, Georgia
- Died: June 25, 1982 (aged 87); Savannah, Georgia
- Burial place: Laurel Grove Cemetery; Savannah, Georgia
- Military career
- Allegiance: United States of America
- Branch: United States Army Air Service; United States Army Air Corps; United States Army Air Force
- Service years: 1917–1919, 1920–1946
- Rank: Major General
- Nickname: Monk
- Units: 103rd Aero Squadron; 1st Pursuit Group
- Commands: 94th Aero Squadron; 95th Pursuit Squadron; 17th Pursuit Group; 79th Pursuit Squadron; 23rd Composite Group; VIII Fighter Command; First Air Force
- Conflicts: World War I World War II
- Awards: Distinguished Service Cross (5); Army Distinguished Service Medal; Silver Star; Legion of Merit; Distinguished Flying Cross; Purple Heart

Frank O'Driscoll Hunter (December 8, 1894 – June 25, 1982) was a World War I flying ace, being credited by the United States Army Air Service with downing nine enemy aircraft. Hunter became an advocate of fighter aircraft strategy and tactics. In World War II he served as commanding general of the VIII Fighter Command and, later, the First Air Force.

== Early career ==
Hunter was born in Savannah, Georgia on December 8, 1894. He was educated at Hotchkiss School, Connecticut, and in Lausanne, Switzerland. He enlisted in the Aviation Section, Signal Reserve, as a flying cadet on May 18, 1917.

== World War I service ==
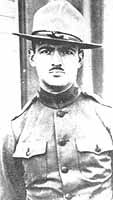
Hunter during World War I

Hunter went to France in September 1917 and received further training at the 3rd Aviation Instruction Center at Issoudun, France. Assigned to the 103rd Aero Squadron in May 1918, on his first combat patrol Hunter downed two German planes and landed safely despite being wounded. By the end of the war he had nine German planes to his credit, earning him recognition as an ace. Hunter was the last pilot remaining with the squadron before its return to the United States, transferring out on January 24, 1919.

Hunter was awarded the Distinguished Service Cross with four oak leaf clusters, more than any person other than Eddie Rickenbacker who received six oak leaf clusters to the DSC. His achievements in aerial combat earned him the French Croix de Guerre with palm. He left the Army for a short time after the war, but returned with a commission in the Regular Army Air Service in 1920.

== Between the world wars ==
When Hunter entered the Regular Army in 1920 he attended Field Artillery School and Air Service Observation School at Fort Sill, Oklahoma. He graduated in September 1921 and transferred to Ellington Field, Texas, for duty with the 1st Pursuit Group. In July 1922, he went to Selfridge Field, Michigan, as commanding officer of the 94th Squadron, and in October 1922, entered the Air Service Tactical School at Langley Field, Virginia, returning to his command of the 94th Squadron when he graduated in June 1923. In July 1925 he became Operations Officer of Selfridge Field.

Hunter transferred to Camp Anthony Wayne, Pennsylvania., in September 1926 as a pilot with the Composite Air Corps Squadron, and returned to Selfridge Field in December 1926. He next served in Washington, D.C., in the Office of the Chief of Air Corps, and in December 1930 went to Rockwell Field, California, as commanding officer of the 95th Pursuit Squadron. He assumed command of the 17th Pursuit Group there in October 1931.

In November 1933 Hunter was assigned as executive officer of the 1st Pursuit Wing at March Field, California, and in February 1934 became chief of operations, Western Zone Air Mail Operations, with headquarters at March Field. In May 1934 he returned to his duties as executive officer of the 1st Pursuit Wing. He was ordered to Albrook Field, Panama Canal Zone, in July 1934, as adjutant and operations officer of the 19th Composite Wing. In December 1934 he became operations and training officer and intelligence officer at Albrook Field.

Hunter transferred to Barksdale Field, Louisiana, in November 1936 as commanding officer of the 79th Pursuit Squadron, and in July 1937 became operations officer for the 3rd Wing there. He then went to Maxwell Field, Alabama, in July 1939 as commanding officer of the 23rd Composite Group.

== World War II service ==
In May 1940 the citizens of Savannah, Georgia., named the Savannah Municipal Airport the Hunter Municipal Airfield, later Savannah Army Air Base, Hunter Air Force Base, then Hunter Army Air Field in his honor. In July 1940 he was attached to the Office of the Military Attaché in London, England, as a Military Observer. He returned to the United States in December 1940 and was stationed at Orlando Army Air Base, Fla., as commanding officer of the 23rd Composite Group. In February 1942, he was assigned to Headquarters Army Air Forces, Washington, D.C., and in May 1942 joined the Eighth Air Force at Bolling Field, Washington, D.C. That same month he accompanied that organization to the European Theater of Operations, with headquarters in London, as commanding general, VIII Fighter Command. In this position he affected the first trans-Atlantic flight of AAF planes without the loss of life or equipment. He also directed the first P-47 fighter-bomber sweeps over the continent.

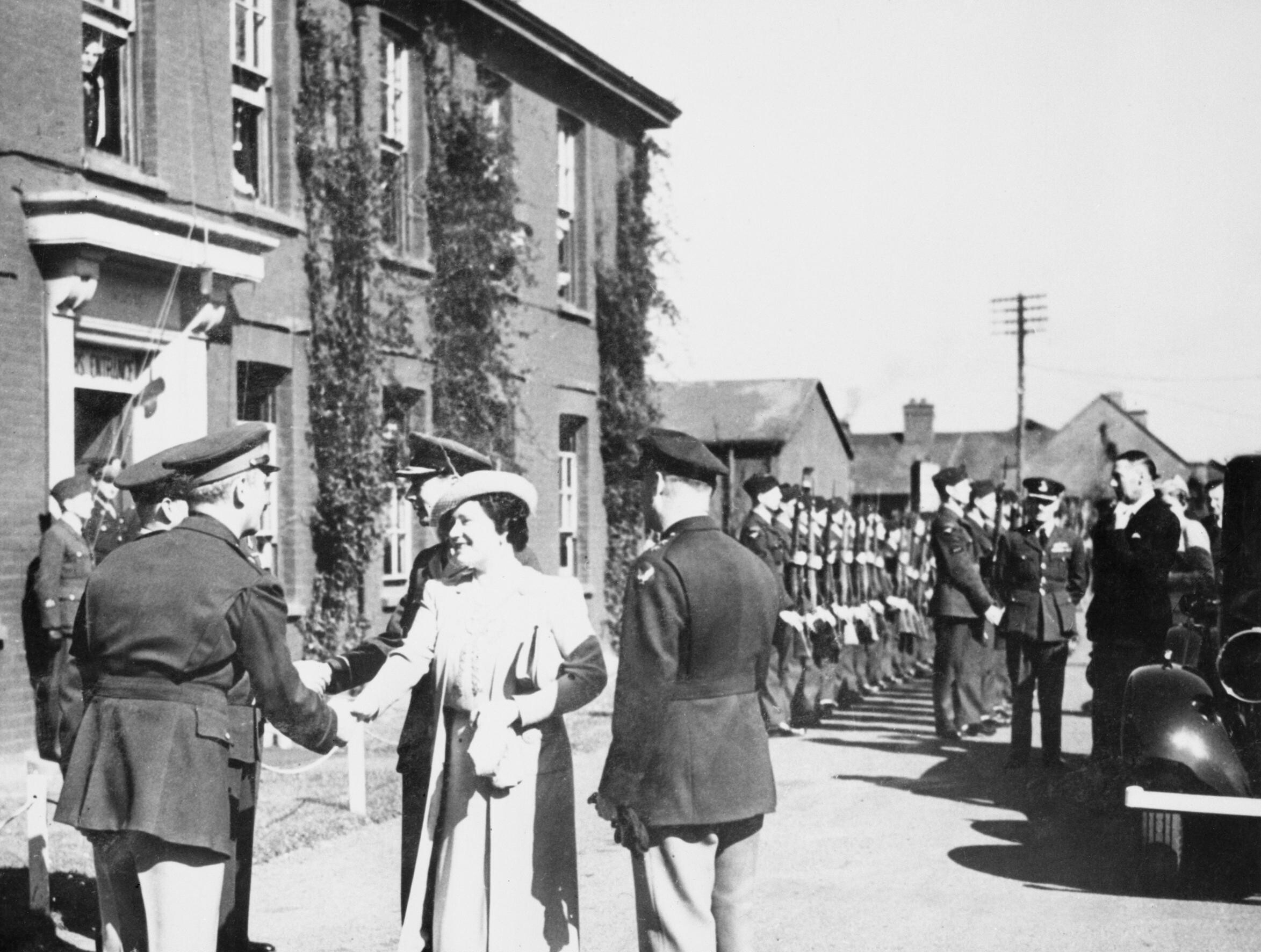
H.M. King George VI and Queen Elizabeth are greeted by Major General Frank Hunter and Major General Ira C. Eaker of the 8th U.S. Army Air Forces on the occasion of their visit to Duxford, Cambridgeshire on 26 May 1943.

It was upon Brigadier General Hunter's recommendation that the Eagle Squadrons (which had American pilots in the service of the United Kingdom) were transferred from the Royal Air Force to become the 4th Fighter Group in September 1942.

In May 1943, Hunter was relieved of his command for his failure to obey a directive issued by his superior, General Ira C. Eaker mandating use of wing tanks on P-47 fighters. He returned to the United States in August 1943 and was named commanding general of the First Air Force, where he was charged with training replacement air crews. His tenure in this command was marred by his involvement in maintaining racial segregation in the U. S. Army, thus provoking the Freeman Field Mutiny of the Tuskegee Airmen.

In 1944 the Earl of Halifax, then Britain's ambassador to the U.S., presented to General Hunter, in the name of the King of England, the CBE, "Commander of the military division of the most excellent order of the British Empire." Just a year earlier the general had been awarded the Legion of Merit for "exceptional services" in planning and executing the movement of air echelons of the Twelfth Air Force from Great Britain to North Africa. His other awards include the Distinguished Flying Cross and Purple Heart.

Among the units under Hunter's command was the all Negro 477th Bombardment Group stationed at Freeman Field in Seymour, Indiana. Hunter was commanding general when 104 African-American were subjected to military court martial for trying to integrate the base's officer club in early 1945. Hunter earned the reputation of being a rabid racist. This information is omitted from Hunter's biography because the U.S. Army Air Forces' strict segregation policy.

In October 1945 he was assigned to a detachment of patients at Air Force Regional Hospital, Miami District, and later was admitted to Walter Reed General Hospital.

He was rated a command pilot, combat observer and technical observer. Throughout his lengthy flying career, he survived three bail outs, one of which was from an altitude of 500 feet over a frozen lake, and two broken backs, both of which kept him in the hospital for a year. He became known as one of the Army's top stunt, test and racing pilots.

== Post World War II ==
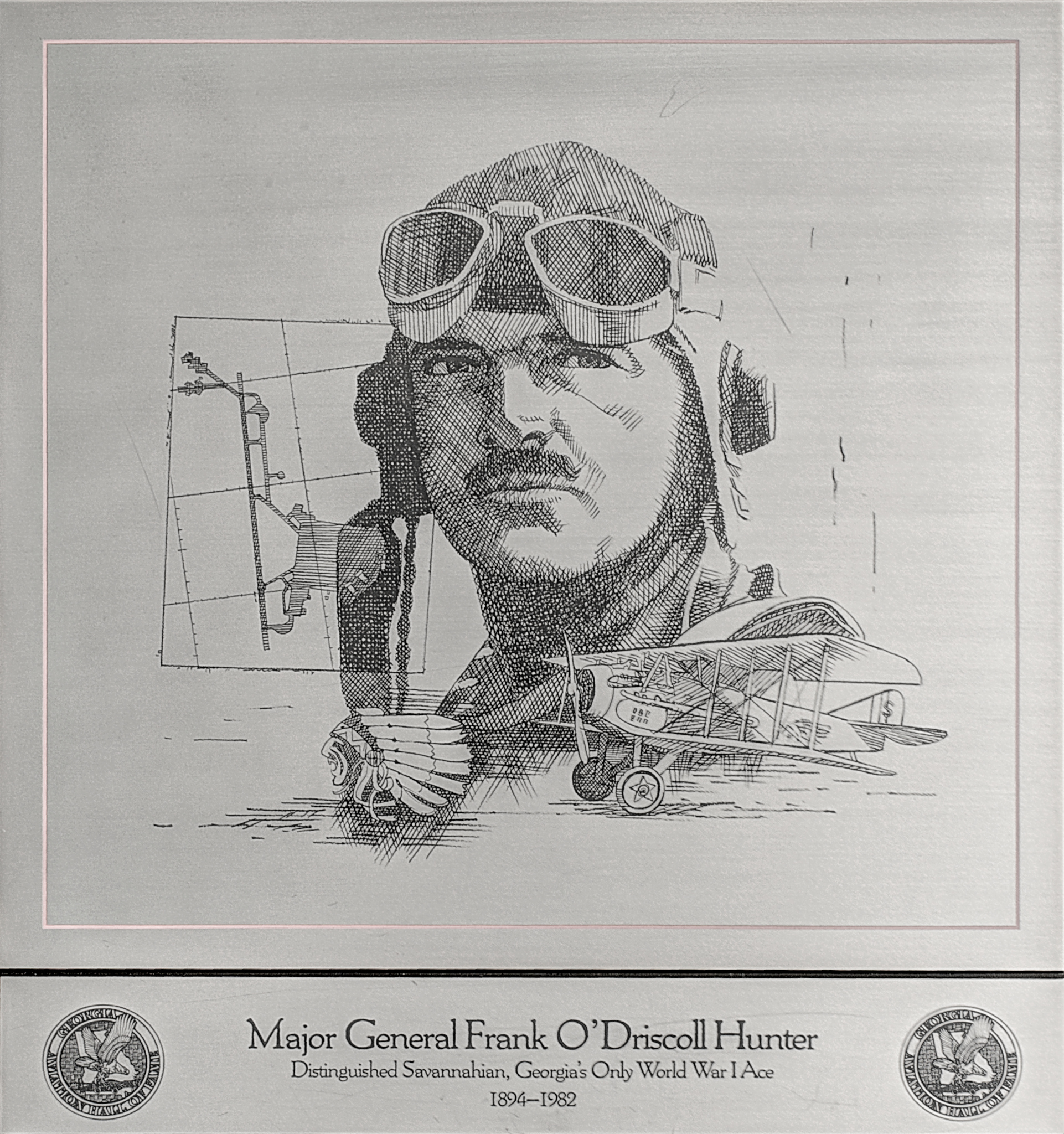
Plaque of Hunter at the Georgia Aviation Hall of Fame

General Hunter retired from the Army Air Forces on March 31, 1946, and returned to his home state of Georgia. He died on 25 June 1982 in Savannah, Georgia.

The Georgia Historical Society houses and makes available for research a collection of General Hunter's papers. The collection, comprising news clippings, photographs, commendations and awards, and personal and military correspondence, documents the life and military career of Frank O'Driscoll Hunter from 1917 to 1982. In 1989 Hunter was inducted into the Georgia Aviation Hall of Fame.

== Effective dates of promotion ==
- Sergeant, Enlisted Reserve Corps – May 18, 1917
- 1st lieutenant, Officers Reserve Corps – September 19, 1917
- Discharged – February 24, 1919
- 1st lieutenant – July 1, 1920 (accepted on November 28, 1920)
- Captain – January 17, 1921
- Major (temporary) – March 15, 1935; (permanent) November 1, 1936
- Lieutenant colonel (temporary) – March 1, 1940; (permanent) October 9, 1940
- Colonel (temporary) – April 19, 1941
- Brigadier general (temporary) – April 20, 1942
- Major general (temporary) – November 3, 1943
- Major general (retired list) – March 31, 1946

== Awards and decorations ==
Included among his 10 awards for valor and service, in addition to receiving five awards of the Distinguished Service Cross, Hunter was decorated with the Army Distinguished Service Medal and the Silver Star. He was also awarded a Legion of Merit, Distinguished Flying Cross and Purple Heart.

US Army Air Forces Command Pilot Badge

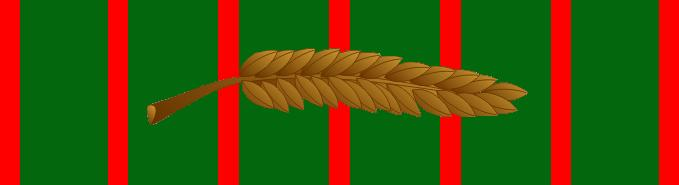
Distinguished Service Cross with four bronze oak leaf clusters
Army Distinguished Service Medal
Silver Star
Legion of Merit
Distinguished Flying Cross
Purple Heart
World War I Victory Medal with three bronze campaign stars
American Defense Service Medal with one service star
American Campaign Medal
Asiatic-Pacific Campaign Medal
European-African-Middle Eastern Campaign Medal
World War II Victory Medal
Commander of the Order of the British Empire (United Kingdom)
Croix de Guerre (WWI), with Palm (France)

He was also rated a Combat Observer and Technical Observer.

=== World War I citations ===
Lieutenant Frank Hunter of the American Expeditionary Forces Air Service in World War I received five Distinguished Service Cross citations:

- "Frank O'D. Hunter, First Lieutenant, Air Service, pilot, 103d Aero Squadron. For extraordinary heroism in action in the region of Ypres, Belgium, June 2, 1918. Lieut. Hunter, while on patrol, alone attacked two enemy biplanes, destroying one and forcing the other to retire. In the course of the combat he was wounded in the forehead. Despite his injuries he succeeded in returning his damaged plane to his own aerodrome."
- "A bronze oak leaf, to be worn with the Distinguished Service Cross, for extraordinary heroism in action in the region of Champey, France, September 13, 1918. He, accompanied by one other mono-place plane, attacked an enemy patrol of six planes. Despite numerical superiority and in a decisive combat, he destroyed one enemy plane and, with the aid of his companion, forced the others within their own lines."
- "A second bronze oak leaf, for extraordinary heroism in action near Verneville, France, September 17, 1918. Leading a patrol of three planes, he attacked an enemy formation of eight planes. Although out-numbered, they succeeded in bringing down four of the enemy. Lieut. Hunter accounted for two of these."
- "A third bronze oak leaf, for extraordinary heroism in action in the region of Liny-devant-Dun, France. While separated from his patrol he observed an allied patrol of seven planes (Breguets) hard pressed by enemy formation of 10 planes (Fokker type). He attacked two of the enemy that were harassing a single Breguet and in a decisive fight destroyed one of them. Meanwhile five enemy planes approached and concentrated their fire upon him. Undaunted by their superiority, he attacked and brought down a second plane."
- "A fourth bronze oak leaf, for extraordinary heroism in action in the region of Bantheville, France. While on patrol he encountered an enemy formation of six monoplanes. He immediately attacked and destroyed one enemy plane and forced the others to disperse in confusion."

On 23 October 1918, International News Service staff & war correspondent Newton C. Parke wrote an article that described one of the missions that Hunter flew over France:

Lieut. Frank O. Hunter of Savannah, Ga., scored his eighth unofficial air victory northwest of Verdun this morning. In the combat Percy D. Dine of New York City and Wm. H. Ponder of Lone Wolf, Okla., each shot down an enemy plane, the latter elevating himself to the position of an ace by his exploit. Reed Chambers of Memphis, Tenn., another new ace, was unofficially credited with shooting down two boches yesterday and Eddie Rickenbacker got another. Eleven American planes were engaging at one time yesterday against 30 machines. Lieut. Benson of the American air service single handed wandered thirty miles behind the enemy lines in the darkness and turned his machine gun upon an enemy troop train meanwhile dropping bombs.

== Assignments ==
- 1939–1940 Commanding officer of the 23d Composite Group, Maxwell Field, Alabama
- 1940 Military observer and assistant air attaché at the American Embassies in Paris, France and London, England
- 1940–1942 Commanding officer of the 23d Composite Group, Orlando, Florida
- 1942–1943 Commanding general of the VIII Interceptor (later, Fighter) Command, High Wycombe, England
- 1943–1945 Commanding general of the First Air Force, Mitchel Field, New York
- 1946 Retired (disability in line of duty)

== See also ==
- Tuskegee Airmen
- List of World War I flying aces from the United States

== Bibliography ==
- Over the Front: A Complete Record of the Fighter Aces and Units of the United States and French Air Services, 1914–1918 Norman L. R. Franks, Frank W. Bailey. Grub Street, 1992. ISBN 0-948817-54-2, ISBN 978-0-948817-54-0.
- The Tuskegee Airmen: Mutiny at Freeman Field. James C Warren. Conyers, 2001. ISBN 0-9660818-1-1, ISBN 978-0-9660818-1-7.
