= Edgar Kain =

New Zealand fighter pilot

Edgar James Kain
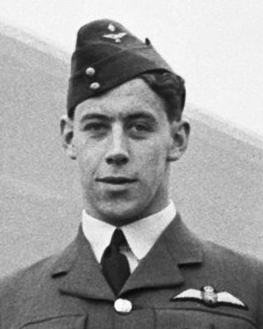
- Born: 27 June 1918; Hastings, New Zealand
- Died: 7 June 1940 (aged 21); Échemines, France
- Military career
- Allegiance: United Kingdom
- Branch: Royal Air Force
- Service years: 1936–1940
- Rank: Flying officer
- Nickname: Cobber
- Service number: 39534
- Unit: No. 73 Squadron
- Conflicts: Second World War; Phoney War; Battle of France
- Awards: Distinguished Flying Cross; Mention in despatches

Edgar James Kain, DFC (27 June 1918 – 7 June 1940) was a New Zealand fighter pilot and flying ace who flew in the Royal Air Force (RAF) during the Second World War.

Born in Hastings, New Zealand, Kain developed an early interest in aviation and joined the RAF in 1936. He completed his flight training the following year and was posted to the RAF's No. 73 Squadron, flying the Gloster Gladiator and then the Hawker Hurricane. On the outbreak of the Second World War the squadron was dispatched to France. Kain began flying operational sorties during the Phoney War and gained his first aerial victory, a German bomber, in November 1939. He claimed his fifth aerial victory in March 1940, becoming the RAF's first flying ace of the Second World War as well as its first recipient of the Distinguished Flying Cross. His success early in the war and consequent media reports made him well known in Britain and the Dominions.

The Phoney War ended on 10 May 1940, when the German invasion of France and the Low Countries began. Within 17 days, Kain had claimed a further 9 aerial victories. By early June, he was physically exhausted and ordered to return to England. On 7 June 1940, having bid farewell to his squadron and in a gesture to his comrades, he took off in a Hurricane to perform a series of low-level aerobatics over Échemines airfield. While performing one of these manoeuvres, he crashed at high speed and was killed instantly. At the time of his death he was ranked flying officer and was officially credited with 14 aerial victories. Subsequent research suggests he destroyed 16 enemy aircraft. Originally buried in Troyes Cemetery, his remains were relocated to the Commonwealth War Graves Commission's Choloy War Cemetery, near Nancy, after the war.

== Early life ==
Edgar James Kain was born in Hastings, New Zealand, on 27 June 1918, the third of four children of George Kain, a warehouseman, and his wife Nellie née Keen. His family moved to Wellington, where his father set up a warehousing business. Kain was educated at Croydon School and, from 1932, at Christ's College, Christchurch, where he boarded. At school he played rugby, participated in rowing and excelled at athletics. He was seen as a natural leader, but unmotivated academically.

In Christchurch, Kain's school was near Wigram Aerodrome and he would often see aircraft of the Royal New Zealand Air Force approaching and taking off. He was passionate about aviation from an early age and eager to fly. After three years at Christ's College, with a poor academic record, he left school in 1935 without graduating. He worked as a clerk in his father's warehousing business and also became a member of the Wellington Aero Club. His intention was to obtain a pilot's licence and then join the Royal Air Force (RAF).

Kain's flying lessons commenced in early 1936 and he soon soloed in a Tiger Moth, having accumulated just over seven hours of flying time. He also received tuition in mathematics from Professor George William von Zedlitz of the Victoria University of Wellington; this was necessary after his failure to graduate from secondary school as such academic qualifications were prerequisites enter the RAF as a pilot. Later that year he transferred to Wigram for further flight training and he soon secured his pilot's licence. He was then able to meet the requirements for a short-service commission in the RAF; under this scheme, entrants would serve a four-year period and then, if suitable, transfer to a permanent commission. Applicants needed to apply to the Air Ministry in London. Accordingly, having convinced his parents to support his endeavours, Kain departed New Zealand in November 1936, accompanying his father on a business trip to England aboard the RMS Orford.

== Early military career ==
Once in London, Kain formally applied to the Air Ministry for a short-service commission in the RAF but failed his medical due to high blood pressure. He was told to reapply once he had acclimatised; the lengthy voyage from New Zealand had taken its toll on his fitness. He spent two weeks labouring on a farm to improve his condition and passed the subsequent medical. Having been accepted, Kain was sent to a civilian flying school in Brough, near Hull, for elementary flight training. The use of a civilian facility was to help filter out unsuitable entrants before entering the RAF flight training system. Kain commenced his training at the school on 21 December 1936, and was soon flying a Blackburn B-2 trainer solo. Towards the end of the ten-week course, he was asked for his preference for further training: bombers or fighters. He opted for fighters, seeing it as a more exciting prospect.

On completion of the elementary course on 5 March 1937, Kain was accepted for a short-service commission with the rank of acting pilot officer and the service number 39534. His probationary period of 12 months began on 8 March 1937, calculated from the commencement of his elementary training. He proceeded to RAF Uxbridge for basic military training and then went onto No. 5 Flying Training School at RAF Sealand in Cheshire. He gained his wings on 25 June 1937 and was sent to RAF Ternhill a few months later for advanced training on fighters, flying the Hawker Fury. By this time, Kain had become proficient in aerobatics, but he had also been disciplined for performing stunts at too low an altitude.

In November 1937, his training complete, Kain was posted to No. 73 Squadron, which was equipped with the Gloster Gladiator biplane fighter and based at RAF Digby. While serving with the squadron he became known as Cobber, New Zealand slang for a friend. This was partly to distinguish him from his fellow pilot, Derek Kain, also a New Zealander and a distant relative. The nickname was also a reflection of his friendly and outgoing nature. Kain's probationary period ended on 21 December 1937, and his rank of pilot officer was confirmed. He continued to develop his aerobatic skills with the Gladiator and in May 1938 took part in the Empire Air Day, giving flying demonstrations to the public. Two months later, the squadron began converting to the new monoplane Hawker Hurricane and Kain began to find its limits, causing light damage to his aircraft after putting it into a high-speed dive, an action for which he was reprimanded. In mid-September 1938, during the Sudetenland crisis, the squadron was placed on standby, although its pilots were not yet fully proficient on the Hurricane. The Munich Agreement that was concluded at the end of the month reduced tensions, and familiarisation training on the Hurricane resumed. In June 1939, Kain crashed during a night flying exercise, when he forgot to lock the undercarriage while landing. A loose panel affected the aircraft's handling, distracting Kain during his landing procedure. He was officially admonished despite the extenuating circumstances. He had a further accident in late July while landing on another night time flying exercise; this time the issue was the surface of the aerodrome and no blame was attached to Kain. He had been promoted to flying officer earlier in the month.

== Second World War ==
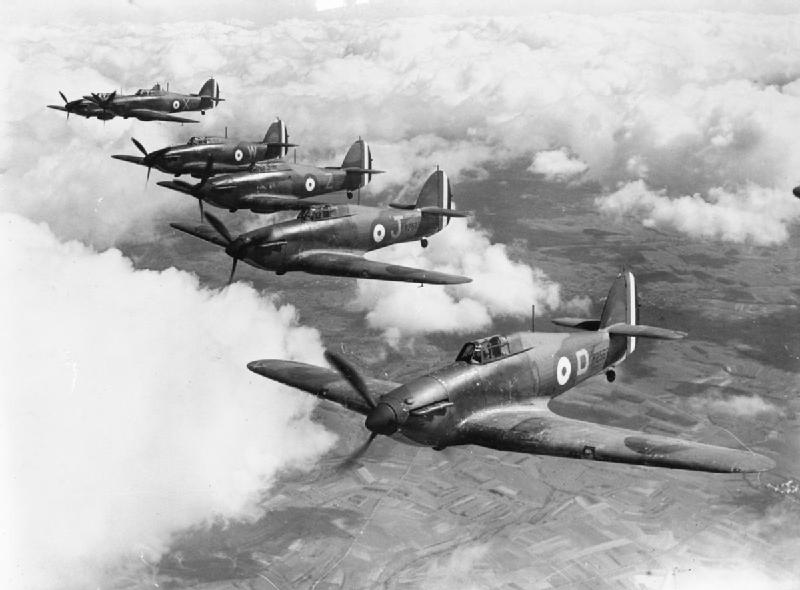
No. 73 Squadron Hawker Hurricanes in flight over France

On 24 August 1939, as tensions escalated between Britain and Germany, No. 73 Squadron was mobilised for war. It was intended to send the squadron to France as the Air Component of the British Expeditionary Force (BEF), designated as part of No. 60 Mobile Wing along with No. 1 Squadron. On 8 September 1939, the Second World War now underway, it deployed to France, initially to Le Havre-Octeville aerodrome in Normandy. On 10 September 1939, Kain flew his first operational patrols, covering ships disembarking the BEF at Cherbourg, without making contact with the enemy. The weather prevented flying for much of the next two weeks and his squadron moved to an airfield near St. Omer towards the end of the month. From there it moved to Rouvres, near Verdun.

=== Phoney War ===
No. 73 Squadron's new base was close to the border between France and Germany, and No. 60 Mobile Wing was attached to the Advanced Air Striking Force (AASF), comprising several squadrons of Fairey Battles of Bomber Command. The following months saw little offensive activity in the air; this stage of the conflict was known as the Phoney War. Despite the squadron's proximity to the German border, there was little contact with the enemy and few successful interceptions.

By this point, Kain was a section leader in No. 73 Squadron, with responsibility for two wingmen. On 8 November, while on patrol, he spotted a Dornier Do 17 bomber above and ahead of him. As the Do 17 began to climb to 27,000 feet (8,200 m), Kain pursued, made two attacks, and observed several strikes by his machine guns. With his Hurricane showing signs of strain, he attacked again and the Do 17 dived steeply. Kain followed but pulled out when he saw fabric peeling off his wings. The bomber crashed into the small village of Lubey, northwest of Metz, exploding on impact and killing the crew. It was the first aerial victory of the war for No. 73 Squadron and also for a pilot from one of the Dominions. The event was widely reported although, due to the RAF prohibition of the naming of its personnel in the media, Kain was not identified as the successful pilot in British newspapers. Instead he was simply referred to as a 21-year-old New Zealander. (Note: An MG 15 machine gun recovered from that aircraft was featured as part of the Outbreak 1939 exhibition at the Imperial War Museum. The Air Force Museum of New Zealand in Christchurch also holds an MG 15 from the Do 17.)

Weather conditions affected the flight operations of the wing, now re-designated as No. 67 Wing, for several days, but Kain had a successful encounter on 23 November, near Conflans, when he shot down another Do 17. It was one of four German bomber and reconnaissance aircraft claimed as destroyed by No. 73 Squadron pilots that day. There was little flying from December to February due to the weather. Kain spent some of this period in England on leave with Joyce Phillips, a theatre actress he had met while completing his flight training in 1937. He had been corresponding with her for some time. On returning to the squadron, he temporarily took command of one of its flights. The weather still permitted occasional patrols; in late January his flight encountered a Heinkel He 111 medium bomber but Kain's guns failed to fire. This was later put down to them being affected by the extreme cold. His aircraft received damage from the He 111's defensive armament, and on landing was found to be irreparable. Kain relinquished command of the flight at the end of January, when its regular leader returned from leave.

By early February 1940 the thaw was well underway, but this affected the runway of the aerodrome which was prone to bogging, impacting flight operations for the next few weeks. Kain was mentioned in dispatches on 20 February 1940 for his efforts pursuing the He 111 that he sighted late the previous month. Weather conditions improved on 1 March 1940, and the following day Kain became involved in a dogfight with two Messerschmitt Bf 109 fighters while in pursuit of some He 111s. He destroyed the first Bf 109 but the second damaged his engine with cannon fire before departing. (Note: Aviation historian Max Lambert notes that it has been speculated that this second Bf 109 was flown by the German ace Werner Mölders.) Over the German lines when the attack took place, Kain glided 30 miles (48 km) from 20,000 feet (6,100 m) to reach French territory. When his damaged engine caught fire, Kain prepared to bail out but had to re-enter the cockpit when he realised his parachute strap was not in position. The flames went out and Kain glided on to a forced-landing at Metz. His Hurricane was a wreck and he had to be flown back to Rouvres by a Bristol Blenheim in the evening. The encounter was reported by the BBC in its main radio bulletin later that day; Kain was not named and only referred to as a New Zealander. A few days later, identified as Cobber, he completed a BBC Radio interview that was broadcast on 9 March 1940. Reporters from the United States were not so restricted and his identity was becoming known in his home country.

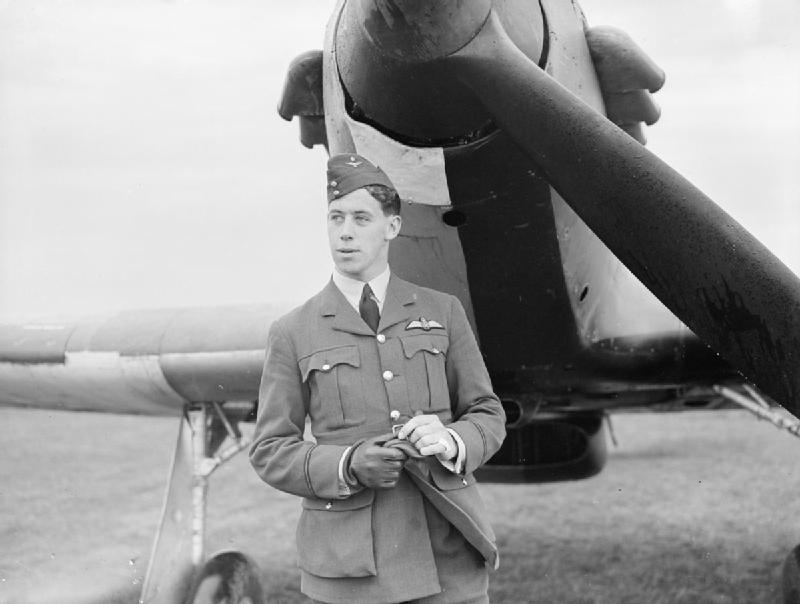
A formal publicity photograph of Kain following the announcement of the award of his Distinguished Flying Cross

Kain was soon back on operations and, at the same time, the squadron was re-equipping with updated Hurricanes. In mid-March he was informed of his impending award of the Distinguished Flying Cross (DFC), in recognition of the action earlier in the month when he had shot down his first Bf 109. It was to be the first such award to a pilot of Fighter Command. He promptly took ill with German measles and was hospitalised for several days. He did not return to operational duty until 26 March. That day, in the early afternoon he led a section on a defensive patrol over the German lines and encountered a group of Bf 109s. He managed to destroy one Bf 109 and then a second, but shortly afterwards his Hurricane's engine was damaged by a cannon strike from another Bf 109. With his aircraft on fire, he bailed out with shell splinters to his left leg, a bullet-grazed left hand and burns to the face. Landing in no man's land, he made his way to a nearby village. He soon encountered French soldiers and after satisfying them as to his nationality, he was treated by a doctor and driven back to Rouvres in the evening. Shooting down the two Bf 109s in this action made him the RAF's first flying ace of the Second World War. (Note: A flying ace is considered to be a pilot who has destroyed at least five enemy aircraft.) He remained relatively anonymous to the British public, his identity continuing to be simply Cobber when his exploits were reported. The wounds from his latest encounter forced him off flying duties for a few days. During his convalescence the citation for his DFC was published in the London Gazette. It read:

In March, 1940, while on patrol with another aircraft, Flying Officer Kain sighted seven enemy bombers about 5,000 feet above him, and while giving chase well into Germany, he was attacked from behind by an enemy fighter. Showing the finest fighting spirit this officer out-manoeuvred the enemy and although his own aircraft was badly damaged he succeeded in bringing the hostile aircraft down. Thick smoke and oil fumes had filled his cockpit and although unable to see his compass, he skilfully piloted his aircraft inside allied lines in spite of being choked and blinded by the smoke.

— London Gazette, No. 34820, 29 March 1940.

With the announcement of his DFC, the anonymity he had previously been afforded was no longer possible. There was significant public interest in Kain, his endeavours being widely reported in the United Kingdom and in the Dominions; one newspaper correspondent described Kain as "carrying the Dominion banner across the German frontiers in grand style". Kain went on leave to England on 2 April, intending to spend time with Phillips. Much to his irritation, the couple had to deal with intense media interest during his leave. While in England, he and Phillips announced their engagement, and tentatively set a date in July for the wedding.

Kain returned on 14 April to his squadron, which was now based with the rest of No. 67 Wing at Reims and tasked with the protection of the AASF headquarters. Tensions were high as a result of the German invasions of Norway and Denmark, and the Luftwaffe had increased its presence along the French border with Germany. The squadron was shortly back at Rouvres when the expected fighting in France did not occur. Kain was initially stood down from flight operations so did not undertake his first patrol until 21 April. Two days later he and his flight encountered a Messerschmitt Bf 110, which Kain damaged, but was surprised by three Bf 109s which shot down two Hurricanes in return. Kain saw little flying duty for the rest of the month, due to poor weather.

=== Battle of France ===
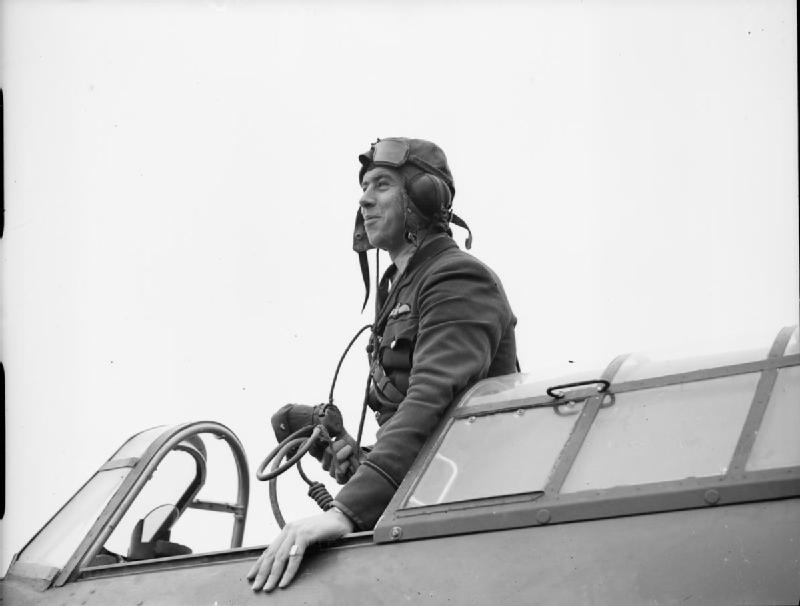
Cobber Kain, wearing his flying helmet and standing in the cockpit of his Hawker Hurricane

On 10 May 1940, the German forces launched the blitzkrieg through the Low Countries and France. No. 73 Squadron was immediately involved, as several Hurricanes scrambled to deal with a number of German bombers. At around 6:00 am, Kain engaged and shot down a Dornier Do 215, one of nine that he sighted near Metz. He encountered another seven on his return to Rouvres but had exhausted his ammunition in the earlier action. The squadron was ordered back to Reims later in the morning, and assembled there by 2:00 pm. Despite the airfield being bombed later in the afternoon, the squadron flew several defensive patrols that day, Kain flying two of them. He flew a defensive patrol the next morning, then a mission escorting bombers of the AASF to a target at Wiltz. On the last patrol of the day he shot down a Do 215; cannon shells from a Bf 110 damaged the fuselage of his Hurricane.

The airfield at Reims was bombed again on 12 May, but this did not affect the squadron's operations, and it flew several missions in the afternoon. While escorting some Fairey Battles on a raid north of Sedan, Kain spotted a Henschel Hs 126 reconnaissance aircraft that he pursued and destroyed over Bouillon. Over the next two days, Luftwaffe activity around Sedan increased in support of the tanks of Panzer Group Kleist crossing the Meuse. The squadron encountered several flights of bombers during operations. Kain had no successful engagements on 13 May to add to his official tally of destroyed aircraft but the same day a newspaper reported that he may have destroyed as many as eleven enemy aircraft, and Kain himself had "lost count". Officially he shot down his tenth enemy aircraft, a Bf 109, the next day.

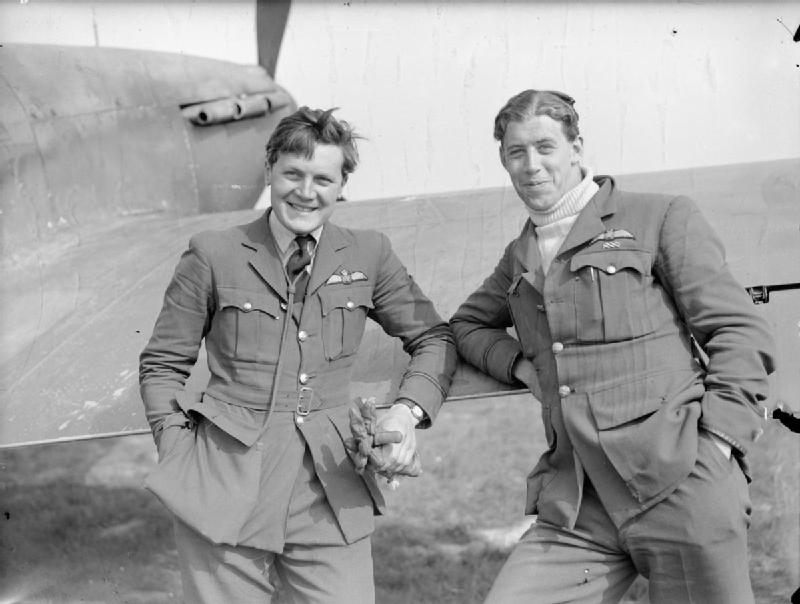
Kain stands on the right, alongside Newell Orton, another flying ace of No. 73 Squadron

On 15 May, Kain's section encountered a Do 17 and began to initiate an attack. Without firing his guns, Kain saw the crew of the bomber promptly bail out to leave the now pilotless bomber to fly on deeper into France. Casualties in the squadron were now mounting, with four pilots missing or killed in action and a fifth invalided from flying. This saw Kain given command of one of the squadron's flights. The next day, the squadron moved to Villeneuve while Kain led his flight in a covering patrol to help protect the shift to the new base. Despite flying several patrols, there were no encounters with the enemy until the afternoon of 17 May, when Kain came across a group of Bf 110s; he damaged one and later destroyed a Bf 109 that disrupted his attempt to attack a Junkers Ju 88. It was a particularly busy day; the end of it, he had accumulated thirteen hours in the air.

The pace of the German advance saw another move by No. 73 Squadron, this time to Gaye, east of Paris, on 18 May. The next day, the entire squadron took part in a defensive patrol during which it met a group of German bombers, He 111s and Ju 88s, with an escort of Bf 110 fighters. The British fighters attacked and Kain shot down a Ju 88 and then a Bf 110. Towards the end of the engagement, he destroyed a He 111. Seven German aircraft had been destroyed for the loss of three Hurricanes, whose pilots all survived to return to the squadron. By now, No. 73 Squadron's pilots were extremely fatigued from extensive operations and minimal rest. Several fresh pilots soon arrived and Kain helped with their introduction to operational flying. On 22 May he received orders to return to England with several other pilots to take on instructional duties.

On arrival in Le Bourget on 23 May, from where the group of pilots were to travel to England, Kain and another pilot were ordered to immediately report back to No. 73 Squadron. Once back at Gaye, the two pilots were put on administrative duties and Kain did not fly again until 25 May. That day he led a section in a morning patrol, during which he destroyed a Do 17 but had to then make an emergency landing back at Gaye due to damage inflicted on his Hurricane by machine-gun fire from the bomber's rear gunner. The next day, in a replacement Hurricane, he shot down a Hs 126 near Bouillon. The situation in France was now deteriorating; the French army was defending the line along the Somme and Aisne with the fighter squadrons of the AASF operating in support, while the BEF was being evacuated from Dunkirk. Kain's focus for 26 May was introducing new pilots to operational duties. The following day, the squadron was operating from a forward base at Boos-Rouen, alongside No. 501 Squadron. It was the subject of a bombing raid during which Kain met Ginger Lacey, who later became one of the RAF's highest scoring flying aces of the war. According to Lacey's biographer, the two were sheltering in what turned out to be a petrol dump. Later in the day, while on a patrol over Boos-Rouen, Kain shot down a Do 17.

By this time Kain was very fatigued. Many of his fellow pilots had become casualties or been sent back to the United Kingdom, leaving him as one of the few still remaining of the squadron's original flying roster. Other pilots noted he was increasingly preoccupied and nervous. Although he flew patrols on 28 May, Kain saw little action and for the next two days he was grounded by No. 73 Squadron's commander. He resumed flying on 31 May, leading a section in an uneventful mission providing cover for Fairey Battle bombers attacking German forces southeast of Reims. The first two days of June were quiet, but then the squadron received orders to move to Le Mans and operate from an advanced airfield at Échemines. Kain led a flight of Hurricanes there early in the morning of 3 June; they then covered the move of the ground crew and administrative staff to Le Mans. He did not fly the next day and flew a single patrol on 5 June, protecting the airfield. He sighted a Bf 109 and pursued it to near Reims, where he shot it down.

=== Final flight ===
On 6 June, suffering nervous exhaustion and fatigue, Kain and another long-serving pilot of No. 73 Squadron received orders to return to England as soon as replacement personnel arrived. A group of pilots arrived the next day for allocation to units of the AASF; four were assigned to Kain's squadron, freeing him to return to England. In front of a group of his squadron mates who gathered at the airfield at Échemines to bid him farewell, he took off in his Hurricane to fly to Le Mans to collect his kit. He then began to perform some low-level aerobatics. On the third of a series of "flick" rolls, he misjudged his altitude and hit the ground heavily. He was thrown from the Hurricane's cockpit and died when he struck the ground some distance away from his crashed aircraft.

Kain was originally buried in Troyes Cemetery on 8 June but after the war, his remains were moved to the Commonwealth War Graves Commission's Choloy War Cemetery, near Nancy. His parents were advised by telegram within two days of his death; his mother and younger sister, Judy Kain, were in transit to England at the time to attend his wedding to Phillips; Judy was to be a bridesmaid. The BBC reported that he was "killed in action" on 10 May. Later in the month, when the RAF published its casualty lists, Kain was recorded as being killed on active service, rather than in action. As the RAF's first recipient of the DFC and its first flying ace of the war, Kain had a high profile in Britain and the Dominions and his death was widely covered in newspapers. King George VI presented Kain's mother and sister, Judy Kain, who had just joined the Women's Auxiliary Air Force, with his DFC in a private ceremony at Buckingham Palace on 4 September 1940.

== Legacy ==
At the time of Kain's death, he was officially credited with the destruction of 14 enemy aircraft. His fellow pilots believed his score to be higher, ranging from 15 to 20 aircraft destroyed. Kain himself, in late May 1940, believed he had shot down 17 aircraft. Inaccurate media reports credited him with even higher tallies; the Evening Post in New Zealand reported him as having shot down over 40 enemy aircraft. Aviation historians Christopher Shores and Clive Williams credit Kain with 16 aircraft destroyed and 1 damaged, as does author Mike Spick.

Kain Place in his home town of Hastings, New Zealand, was named in his honour in 2008. Kain Avenue in Matraville, in the eastern suburbs of Sydney, Australia, is also named for him, as is Kain Avenue, Rotorua.
