= Maurice Leblanc-Smith =

British flying ace (1896–1986)

Maurice Le Blanc-Smith
- Born: 23 February 1896; Leatherhead, Surrey, England
- Died: 29 October 1986 (aged 90); England
- Relatives: Stanley Le Blanc-Smith (father)
- Military career
- Allegiance: United Kingdom
- Branch: British Army; Royal Air Force
- Service years: 1915–1919; 1921
- Rank: Major
- Units: No. 18 Squadron RFC; No. 73 Squadron RFC/RAF
- Conflicts: World War I; Western Front
- Awards: Distinguished Flying Cross

Major Maurice Le Blanc-Smith DFC (23 February 1896 – 29 October 1986) was a British World War I flying ace credited with seven aerial victories.

== Biography ==
=== Background and education ===
Le Blanc-Smith's great-grandfather was Henry Le Blanc (1776–1855), born in Cavenham, Suffolk, one of 13 children of Thomas Le Blanc (1743–1801) and Felicia, née Pelham (1747–1840). The Le Blanc's trace their ancestry back to France. In 1792 Henry joined the 71st (Highland) Regiment of Foot and served in India, Scotland, Ireland and South Africa, before losing a leg to a Spanish cannonball while serving as a major in the Expedition to the Río de la Plata in 1806. He was invalided home to serve as lieutenant colonel of the 5th Royal Veteran Battalion in Guernsey, then as Captain of Invalids and Hospital Major at the Royal Hospital Chelsea. He somehow managed to see action during the battle of Waterloo in 1815, and was eventually promoted to colonel. He married Elizabeth McClintock of Drumcar, Ireland, in 1801 and they had four children. Their youngest child, Lucy Mary Le Blanc was born in Guernsey in 1813.

Lucy Mary married a clergyman, the Reverend Thomas Tunstall Smith (1810–1893), rector of Wirksworth, Derbyshire. Together they had eight children; five boys and three girls. All the boys took the surname Le Blanc-Smith. Their fifth child, and third boy, Stanley Le Blanc-Smith (1849–1922) married Amy Harris in 1880 in Westmorland, and lived in Leatherhead, Surrey, while working as a stockbroker on the London Stock Exchange. They had three sons; Clive (1882–1907), Geoffrey (1884–1968) and Maurice.

Like his father, Maurice was educated at Radley College, and rowed for the First VIII in 1914.

=== Military service ===
Maurice Le Blanc-Smith entered the Royal Flying Corps as a Special Reserve officer, which meant he first had to learn to fly at his own expense before being commissioned (and then was refunded the costs). He was granted Royal Aero Club Aviators' Certificate No. 1440 after flying a Maurice Farman biplane at the Military School, Brooklands Aerodrome, on 14 July 1915, and was commissioned as a second lieutenant (on probation) in the Royal Flying Corps the same day. He completed his military flight training, and was appointed a flying officer and confirmed in his rank on 12 October 1915.

Le Blanc-Smith served in No. 18 Squadron RFC as a bomber and reconnaissance pilot, flying the Airco DH.2 and the Vickers Gunbus. He was appointed a flight commander with the rank of temporary captain on 20 July 1916, before being promoted to the rank of lieutenant on 1 September.

In early 1918, he was reassigned to No. 73 Squadron RFC, flying the Sopwith Camel. With him he brought "Adolphus", a toy dog presented to him by a French girl which was his mascot on his flying missions.

Le Blanc-Smith's first aerial victory came on 10 March 1918 when he destroyed a Fokker Dr.I west of Bohain. On 1 April the Army's Royal Flying Corps and the Royal Naval Air Service (RNAS) were merged to form the Royal Air Force, and his unit became No. 73 Squadron RAF. Le Blanc-Smith destroyed another enemy fighter on 16 May south of the Arras–Cambrai Road, and on 6 June destroyed a Fokker D.VII south of Roye. On the morning of 12 June he destroyed an Albatros D.V north of Courcelles, and in the evening drove down two aircraft, a Fokker D.VII and an Albatros D.V, west of Tricot about a half-hour apart. Both made forced landings and were captured. Finally on 21 July he shared in the destruction of another Fokker Dr.I north-east of Oulchy-le-Château with seven other members of his squadron: Major R. H. Freeman, Lieutenants J. Balfour, Gavin L. Graham, William Sidebottom and William Stephenson, and 2nd Lieutenants Robert Chandler and K. S. Laurie.

Le Blanc-Smith was subsequently awarded the Distinguished Flying Cross, which was gazetted on 2 August 1918. His citation read:

Captain Maurice Le Blanc-Smith.

"A very efficient officer and successful patrol leader, who, during the late operations, has done great execution in attacking ground targets. On a recent occasion he attacked five enemy aeroplanes, destroying one and driving down another out of control."

On 9 August 1918 he was promoted to the temporary rank of major, which he held until 24 April 1919, and the reduction of the establishment following the end of hostilities. He was still listed a member of 73 Squadron when his name was among those mentioned in despatches by Sir Douglas Haig in his despatch of 16 March 1919, which was gazetted on 11 July.

He was transferred to the unemployed list on 20 August 1919. Le Blanc-Smith briefly returned to RAF service, being recommissioned as a flight lieutenant on 9 April 1921, but was re-transferred to the unemployed list on cessation of temporary duty on 5 June.

=== Post-war life ===
Le Blanc-Smith became a director of Bewlay (Tobacconists) Ltd. until retiring in 1959. In 1926 he married Margaret Chance, and they had three children. Le Blanc-Smith died in a nursing home in Lyme Regis in 1986, aged 90.
