= Gavin L. Graham =

South African flying ace (1894–1963)

Gavin Lynedoch Graham
- Born: October 18, 1894; Grahamstown, Cape Colony
- Died: 17 June 1963 (aged 68)
- Military career
- Allegiance: Union of South Africa
- Branch: Royal Flying Corps
- Rank: Lieutenant
- Units: 18th Hussars; No. 70 Squadron RAF; No. 73 Squadron RAF
- Awards: Distinguished Flying Cross; French Legion d'Honneur; Croix de Guerre

Lieutenant Gavin Lynedoch Graham (18 October 1894—17 June 1963) DFC, LdH, CdG was a South African World War I flying ace credited with thirteen confirmed aerial victories.

== Aerial service ==
Graham served with the 18th Hussars from April 1915 through August 1916 before transferring to the Royal Flying Corps. He put in 200 hours flight time as an observer in No. 70 Squadron RFC before being sent to pilot's training in March 1917. On 14 December, he was assigned to No. 73 Squadron RFC as a Sopwith Camel pilot. He scored his first win on 3 May 1918, scored steadily, and on 19 July he became an ace. His next victory, two days later, came during a squadron patrol that destroyed a Fokker Dr.I triplane, and was shared with Major Maurice Le Blanc-Smith, Lieutenant William Sidebottom, Lieutenant William Stephenson, Second Lieutenant Robert Chandler, and two other pilots, with every pilot credited with a win. He would not share a triumph again until his eleventh on 8 August; then he teamed with Chandler and Captain Emile John Lussier to destroy an enemy two-seater reconnaissance plane, for his sole win over a two-seater. On the 25th, he destroyed a Fokker D.VII and teamed with another British pilot to drive down another one out of control. Graham finished his war with over 250 flight hours as a pilot, nine destroyed enemy machines to his credit, three enemy fighters driven down out of control, and one enemy plane captured. On 2 November 1918, he received the Distinguished Flying Cross, being lauded as:

A bold and gallant officer, whose success in attacking troops and transport with bombs and machine guns has been marked. He has also proved himself a skilful fighter in the air, having destroyed eight enemy machines and driven down two others out of control.

== Aerial victory list ==
| No. | Date/time | Aircraft | Foe | Result | Location | Notes |
|---|---|---|---|---|---|---|
| 1 | 3 May 1918 @ 1250 hours | Sopwith Camel | Albatros D.V | Driven down out of control | Ploegsteert | |
| 2 | 21 May 1918 @ 1830 hours | Sopwith Camel | Fokker Dr.1 | Destroyed | Armentieres | |
| 3 | 10 June 1918 @ 1830 hours | Sopwith Camel | Albatros D.V | Destroyed | Mesnet | |
| 4 | 18 July 1918 @ 1500 hours | Sopwith Camel | Fokker D.VII | Destroyed | Oulchy-le-Château | |
| 5 | 19 July 1918 @ 0620 hours | Sopwith Camel | Fokker D.VII | Captured | Chateau-Verses-Freuille | |
| 6 | 21 July 1918 @ 2000 hours | Sopwith Camel | Fokker Dr.1 | Destroyed | Northeast of Oulchy-le-Château | Victory shared with 7 other pilots. |
| 7 | 22 July 1918 @ 1810 hours | Sopwith Camel | Fokker D.VII | Driven down out of control | Bazoches | |
| 8 | 22 July 1918 @ 1810 hours | Sopwith Camel | Fokker D.VII | Destroyed | Bazoches | |
| 9 | 25 July 1918 @ 1900 hours | Sopwith Camel | Fokker D.VII | Destroyed | East of Courmont | |
| 10 | 29 July 1918 @ 1900 hours | Sopwith Camel | Fokker D.VII | Set afire and destroyed | Northeast of Soissons | |
| 11 | 8 August 1918 @ 1720 hours | Sopwith Camel | Reconnaissance craft | Destroyed | Nesle | Shared with two other pilots |
| 12 | 25 August 1918 @ 1125 hours | Sopwith Camel | Fokker D.VII | Destroyed | North of Bapaume | |
| 13 | 25 August 1918 @ 1130 hours | Sopwith Camel | Fokker D.VII | Driven down out of control | North of Bapaume | Victory shared with another pilot |
