= Robert Chandler (RAF officer) =

British flying ace

Robert North Chandler
- Born: 18 December 1898; London, England
- Military career
- Allegiance: United Kingdom
- Branch: British Army; Royal Air Force
- Service years: 1917–1919
- Rank: Lieutenant
- Nickname: Chubby
- Unit: No. 73 Squadron RAF
- Awards: Distinguished Flying Cross

Lieutenant Robert North Chandler (born 18 December 1898; date of death unknown) was a British World War I flying ace credited with seven aerial victories.

== Biography ==
Chandler was appointed a probationary temporary second lieutenant in the Royal Flying Corps on 5 July 1917, being confirmed in the rank on 16 November.

Posted to No. 73 Squadron, flying the Sopwith Camel, he gained his first victory on 24 March 1918, shooting down an Albatros D.V over Vraignes. On 11 April he shot down another D.V south-east of Villers-Bretonneux, and destroyed a Fokker D.VII on 11 June, east of Bus. On 21 July he shared in the destruction of a Fokker Dr.I with Maj. R. H. Freeman, Capt. Maurice Le Blanc-Smith, Lt. Gavin L. Graham, Lt. William Stephenson, 2nd Lt. K. S. Laurie, Lt. William Sidebottom, Lt J. Balfour and Lt W. G. Peters, north-east of Oulchy-le-Château. He destroyed two more D.VII on 22 and 29 July, and finally destroyed a Halberstadt C over Nesle with Lt. Gavin L. Graham and Lt. Emile John Lussier on 8 August.

On 16 September 1918 Chandler was appointed a flight commander with the acting rank of captain.

Chandler was awarded the Distinguished Flying Cross in early 1919. His citation read:

Lieutenant (Acting-Captain) Robert North Chandler.
In aerial fighting this officer has destroyed three enemy aircraft and driven down two others out of control. He has also displayed marked courage in attacking enemy troops, etc., on the ground. On 28 October, having attacked enemy troops with great success and silenced an anti-tank gun, he later on silenced two enemy machine-guns and inflicted heavy casualties on infantry in shell holes. Whilst so engaged, his machine was hit in the engine and he was forced to land.

Chandler was transferred to the unemployed list on 26 May 1919.

After the war he emigrated to Canada. He served in the Royal Canadian Air Force from 1940 to 1946 until he retired as a Wing Commander.
