= No. 73 Squadron RAF =

Defunct flying squadron of the Royal Air Force

- Active: 1 July 1917 – 2 July 1919; 15 March 1937 – 3 February 1969
- Country: United Kingdom
- Branch: Royal Air Force
- Mottos: Latin: Tutor et Ultor ("Protector and Avenger")
- Battle honours: Western Front, 1918*, Marne, 1918*, Lys, Amiens, Arras, Hindenburg Line, France & Low Countries, 1939–40*, Battle of Britain, 1940*, Egypt & Libya, 1940–43*, Mediterranean, 1941–43*, El Alamein*, El Hamma, South East Europe 1943–45*, Italy 1943–45; Honours marked with an asterisk are those emblazoned on the Squadron Standard

Insignia
- Squadron Badge heraldry: A demi-Talbot rampant, charged on the shoulder with a maple leaf. During World War Two the squadron was commanded by Major Hubbard and his aircraft carried a representation of Old Mother Hubbard's dog looking into an empty cupboard. In order to retain its association with this unofficial badge the squadron adopted a heraldic dog and put a maple leaf on it to associate with its Canadian personnel.
- Squadron Codes: HV Oct 1938 – Sep 1939; TP Sep 1939 – Nov 1940

No. 73 Squadron, Royal Air Force was formed on 2 July 1917 during the First World War. It was disbanded in 1969.

== World War I ==
It was initially a unit of the Royal Flying Corps and was formed out of the Central Flying School, based at Upavon, Wiltshire. Eight days later, the new unit moved to RFC Lilbourne, near Rugby.

The squadron, only for a matter of days led by Lieutenant C A Mercer, came under the command of Major H F A Gordon and started a phase of training at Lilbourne. From September 1917, this became more specifically targeted towards operating in combat when a Programme of Development was received, instructing the unit to prepare for an overseas deployment on 22 December.

This training phase saw a number of accidents and incidents, not uncommon in military aviation at that time. On one day, 29 October 1917, the squadron had four aircraft damaged in accidents: two in a mid-air collision, when one aircraft had its propeller damaged, the other lost part of its lower left wing and aileron; one aircraft was damaged when it had to be crash-landed after its pilot became lost; a fourth aircraft was damaged when the pilot crashed at the aerodrome. All incidents are shown in the squadron records as applying to 'A' Flight.

The squadron's first fatality appears to have been 2nd Lieutenant E G Higginson, a 23-year-old Canadian, who died on 4 October 1917 as the result of a flying accident.

=== Combat operations ===
By stages, the unit deployed to France through January 1918; by the 20th, the full squadron complement was based at Liettres and available for operations. Due to bad weather, the first patrols were not sent up until 30 January. Two flights each comprising six machines undertook practice patrols, one along the balloon lines from Boesinghe to Flerbaix and then Bethune to Arras.

The first offensive patrols over enemy lines took place on 18 February 1918. On the 20th, all 18 Camels, divided into three 'Flights' patrolled a line between Roeselare and Menin and the first combat report was completed by Captain Gus Orlebar, submitting that an Albatros D.V may have been damaged. It was the start of a combat record that would show ten aces serving in the squadron, including Owen Baldwin, Gavin L. Graham, William Stephenson, William Henry Hubbard, Emile John Lussier, Robert Chandler, Norman Cooper, Maurice Le Blanc-Smith, Thomas Sharpe, and future Air Vice-Marshal Geoffrey Pidcock.

In March 1918 the squadron was moved to the south of the British Front where it became engaged in the German offensive between Cambrai and St. Quentin where low level strafing was carried out.

In August the squadron was attached to the Tank Corps for special duties in connection with anti-tank gun strafing and took part in a succession of battles on the Third and Fourth Army Fronts. During this phase the squadron expended 25,000 rounds of ammunition and 160 25 lb. Cooper bombs in one day's flying.

At the cessation of hostilities the Camels of No. 73 were disposed of and the personnel posted to RAF Yatesbury, where the squadron was disbanded. During wartime operations the pilots of the squadron had destroyed or sent down out of control 132 enemy aircraft.

=== Aircraft used ===
As at 1 October 1917, the squadron had the following aircraft:

'A' Flight:

- 2 Sopwith Camels
- 1 Sopwith Pup
- 2 Nieuports

'B' Flight:

- 2 Avros
- 1 Nieuport

'C' Flight:

- 1 Avro

From November 1917, the squadron began to re-equip entirely with Sopwith Camels powered by 130 hp Clerget engines. By the time it deployed to France in January 1918, the squadron had 18 Camels, which it retained throughout the rest of the Great War.

== World War II ==
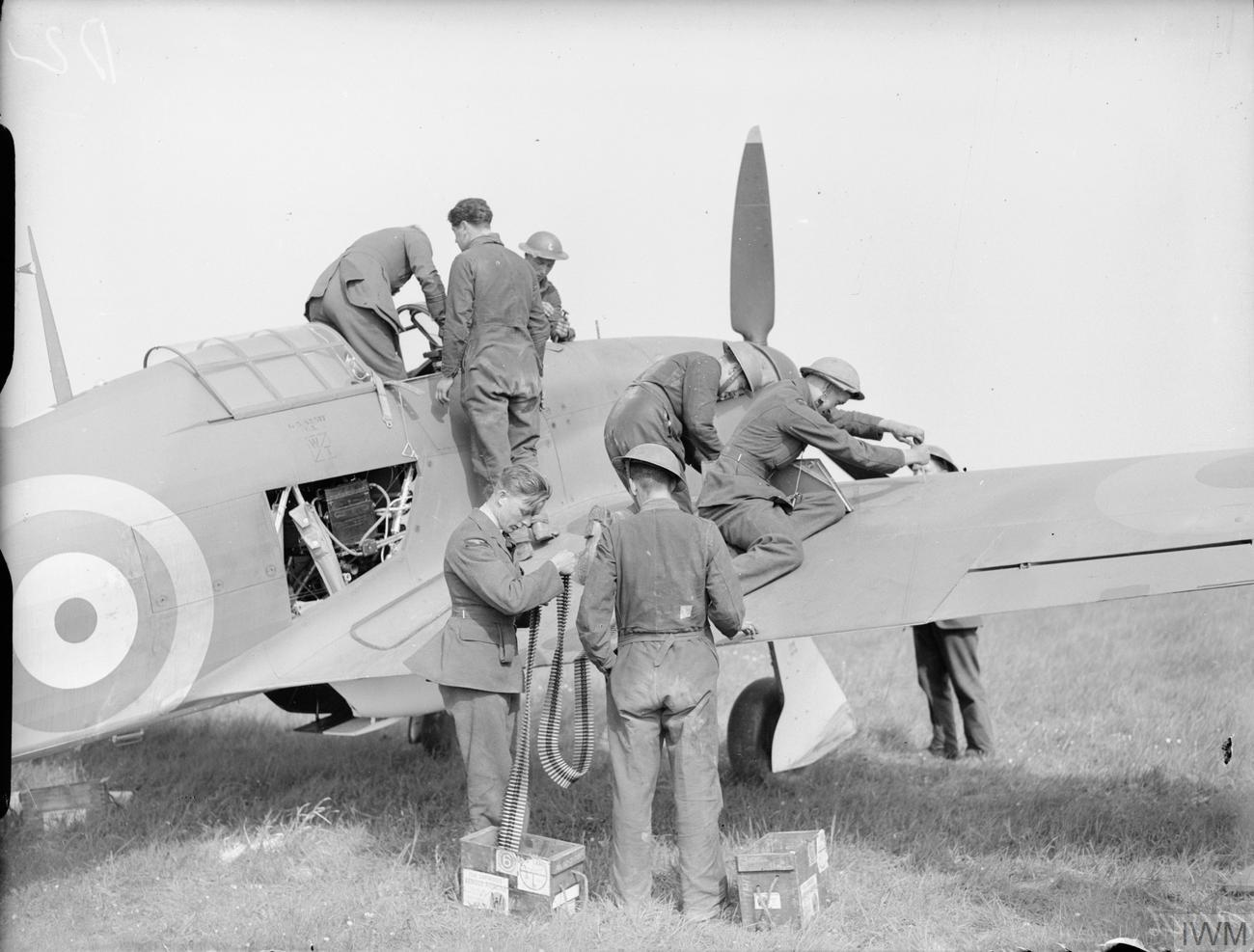
A Hawker Hurricane Mark I flown by Flight Lieutenant J E "Ian" Scoular, commander of 'B' Flight, No. 73 Squadron RAF, being refuelled and re-armed between sorties at Reims-Champagne, 1939 or 1940

The squadron reformed on 15 March 1937 equipped with Hawker Furys, they then relocated to RAF Digby where they were re-equipped with Gloster Gladiators, and then Hawker Hurricanes.

In September 1939, 73 Squadron, along with No. 1 Squadron were then posted to North-East France on the outbreak of war as part of the RAF Advanced Air Striking Force. Early in the campaign the squadron controlled the Cherbourg Peninsula, before a move to Rouvres in October. One of the outstanding pilots on the squadron at this time was F/O. E. J. 'Cobber' Kain, who destroyed a Do 17 at 27,000 feet. 'Cobber' was killed in a flying accident on 7 June 1940. Another 'ace' in the squadron at this time was F/O Newell 'Fanny' Orton.

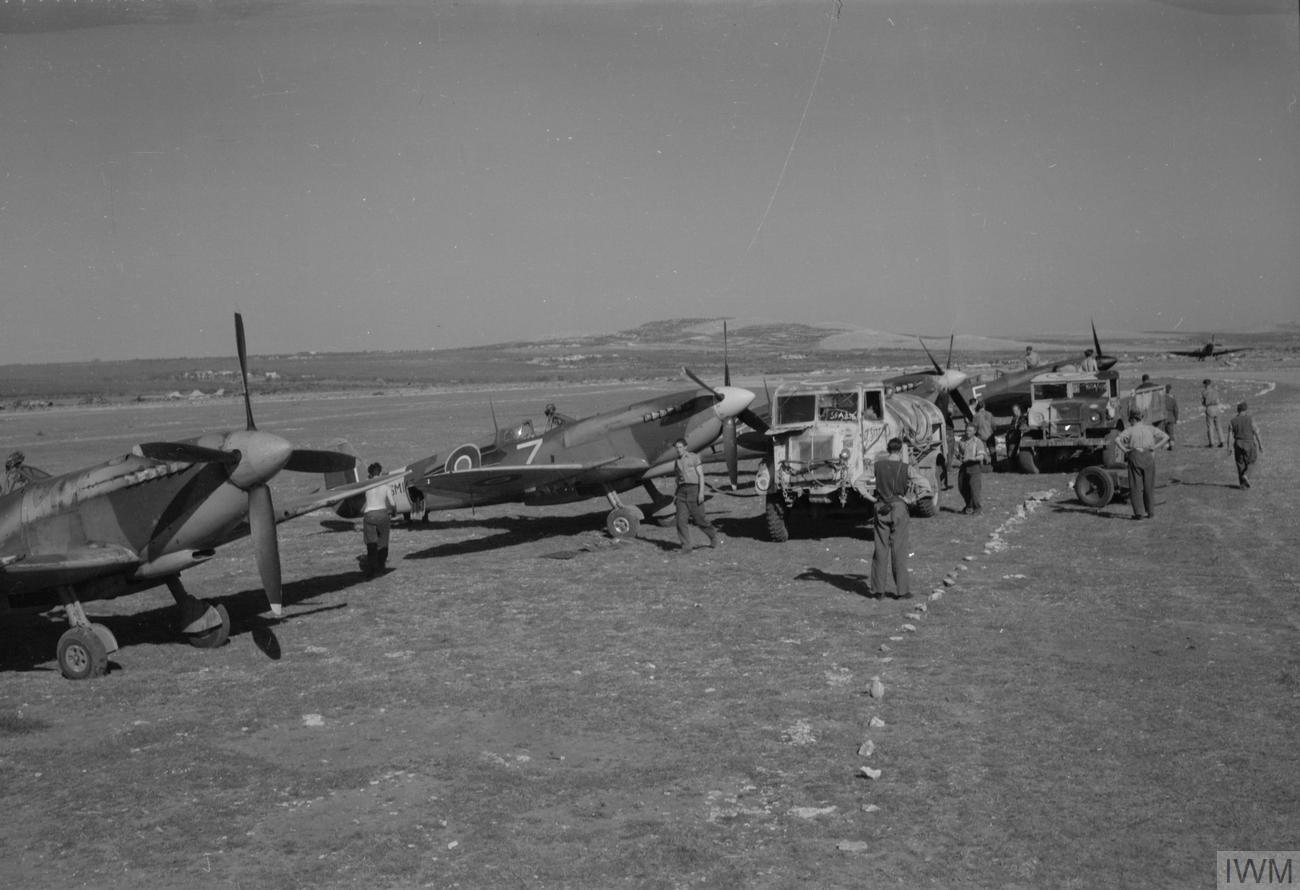
Spitfire Mark IXs of No. 73 Squadron RAF, undergo servicing and refuelling at Prkos, Yugoslavia 1945

After the German attack on 10 May 1940, No. 73 provided cover over Allied airfields and bases, falling back as its airfields were overrun by enemy columns. On 17 June 1940 the squadron had withdrawn from France. The squadron suffered tragedy during the withdrawal when RMS Lancastria was sunk off the coast of St. Nazaire with the loss of around 40 ground crew.

During the Battle of Britain No.73 Squadron, operating from RAF Debden on 5 September until late October, when the unit withdrew in preparation for a move to the Middle East.

The squadron Hurricanes were shipped to Takoradi on the Gold Coast on board HMS Furious, and were then flown in stages across Africa to Egypt. The squadron took part in the series of campaigns in the Western Desert and Tunisia, helping cover the supply routes to Tobruk and taking part in ground-attack operations. In December 1942 the squadron recorded their 300th victory when F/S Beard shot down a Ju 88 over the sea of Benghazi.

In June 1943 the squadron converted to the Spitfire, and were posted to Italy in October. In April 1944 the squadron began to operate over the Balkans, in the fighter-bomber role. In December 1944 part of the squadron was moved to Greece to take part in the fighting against the Communist resistance attempting to seize power. In January 1945 the squadron returned to Italy, and in April moved to Yugoslavia, where it remained until the end of the war moving to Malta in July 1945. Initially at RAF Hal Far, the squadron soon moved to RAF Ta Kali.

== 1950s ==
The squadron, now flying de Havilland Vampire FB.9、Venom FB.1s, was moved to Habbaniya in Iraq in May 1953. In 1955 it was in Cyprus, and deployed to Aden from 1956–57 for the Suez Crisis. The squadron arrived in Akrotiri in March 1957 to form part of the Middle East Air Force Strike Wing, equipped with Canberra B2s. The squadron was disbanded on 10 January 1969.
