= Women's Electoral Lobby (New Zealand) =

Former New Zealand lobbying group

The Women's Electoral Lobby (WEL) in New Zealand was a non-partisan feminist lobby organisation founded in 1975. From the 1970s to the 1990s it worked for greater participation of women in local and national politics. WEL educated and supported women to stand for election, lobbied and advocated for women, and monitored legislation and the media to make sure women's concerns were addressed. It supported the introduction of the proportional representation voting system in 1996 on the grounds that it would lead to greater representation of women in parliament.

== History ==
WEL was founded simultaneously in Auckland and Wellington. Two of the founders Albertje Gurley and Judy Zavos, had seen the work of WEL in Australia and saw a need for a similar organisation in New Zealand. In Auckland, Albertje Gurley organised an inaugural meeting on 25 March 1975 attended by about 80 women. The following day, 26 March 130 women attended a meeting in Wellington organised by Judy Zavos and Marijke Robinson. The Wellington meeting adopted aims and objectives of becoming a non-partisan lobby committed to achieving social, legal, economic, educational and political equality for women.

The organisation grew quickly as the general election of November 1975 approached. Its growth was also attributed to two other events in 1975: the United Nations International Women's Year and a United Women's Convention held in Wellington. A report by the Parliamentary Select Committee on the Status of women in New Zealand helped to focus WEL's policies. Political reaction to WEL ranged from praise to vilification.

WEL's independence was crucial; while it was politically active it was not a political party and was not affiliated to any other group or organisation. Candidates for political office were not permitted to serve on any executive committees though they could be ordinary members.

In 2001 there was a move to wind up WEL (NZ) as there was only one active branch left but a decision was taken to complete WEL's oral and written records before disestablishing the organisation. At that time, there were still many subscribers to the national newsletter, which began in 1977 and ceased in 2004. WEL (NZ) was wound up in 2003.

== Objectives ==
WEL's aims were:

- to inform women about discrimination against them
- to work for the introduction and enactment of legislation to benefit women
- to secure the appointment or election to public office of persons having attitudes and policies which advanced the rights of women.

== Structure and membership ==
=== Structure ===
In June 1976 the inaugural annual national conference was held in Wellington. Twenty one branches formed WEL (NZ), with a national secretary, to present a united and national voice. Branch activities varied; they were able to work on local issues significant for their situation and act as a point of focus for feminist activity. The branches were autonomous though their activities had to be compatible with WEL New Zealand's overall objectives and policies. Formulation of policies and their amendment took place at the national conferences.

=== Membership ===
By the end of 1975 there were 18 WEL branches with a national membership of over 2000. At the end of 1979 membership had declined to 605 members and 15 active branches: Northland, Bay of Islands, Waikato, Tokoroa, Rotorua, Taranaki, Gisborne, Hawke's Bay, Wairarapa, Horowhenua, Kāpiti, Wellington, Motueka, Nelson, and Southland.

Other branches had been active in Kaeo-Kerikeri, Hokianga, West Auckland, Central Auckland, South Auckland, Thames, Tauranga, Taupō, Manawatu, Porirua, and West Coast.

Membership declined during the 1980s although the organisation was still very active. In 1987 there were 322 members in eleven branches and the decline continued into the 1990s with only four active branches left by 1996. In 2000 the WEL Wellington branch was wound up leaving only the Kapiti branch by 2001.

Notable women members were Margaret Evans, Judy Pickard, Di Grant, Danna Glendining, Elaine Jakobsson, Rae Julian, Helen Paske, Ruth Richardson, Margaret Shields, Marilyn Waring and Helene Ritchie. Richardson, Shields and Waring became MPs; Richardson and Shields became cabinet ministers.

== Activities and achievements ==
External image
- Five WEL members presenting a survey of the elderly to the Minister of Social Welfare (copyright till 2025)

Following WEL's foundation in March 1975 its members immediately became active lobbying and formulating policy. In that year WEL achieved the following:

- Lobbied MPs on proposed legislation (1975 Hospital Amendment Bill) which would restrict access to safe abortion to public hospitals
- Monitored and responded to political statements inside and outside parliament
- Compiled a list of women qualified and able to sit on government appointed bodies
- Set up study groups to formulate WEL policies on women's health, education, employment and legal rights
- Arranged four lunches with party leaders before the election. The lunch with Robert Muldoon, the then Leader of the Opposition, was controversial as he did not think women's opinions and questions were worthy of his time
- Surveyed all candidates standing for parliament in the November general election
- Presented a survey of the elderly to the Minister of Social Welfare, Norman King, in May 1975

=== National elections ===
WEL ran the following campaigns for various general elections.

==== 1975 ====
WEL conducted a survey of political candidates standing for election in November. Interviewing for the survey began in August 1975 with face-to-face interviews conducted by WEL members working in teams of two. The survey explored candidates’ attitudes to women's issues and the support they would give to addressing them. The questionnaire had six sections: discrimination, employment, childcare, health, education and awareness of issues facing women. Robert Muldoon had to be persuaded to allow National Party candidates to participate, and many candidates were frightened of being interviewed by politically minded women and having their answers scored. Responses were scored to provide a guide for voters: a score of above 6 recorded the interviewee as either a feminist activist or liar; a minus score was given for views unfavourable to women. The highest score was obtained by Cathy Wilson, the Values Party co-leader and the lowest by Henry May, the Minister of Internal Affairs. Results were released in October 1975 and distributed widely through meetings and the media.

The survey showed how little politicians and political parties considered women's issues with the result that the parties began to formulate policies on women and families. In spite of this four women were elected to parliament, including Marilyn Waring and Colleen Dewe.

==== 1978 ====
For the 1978 general election, a shorter simpler questionnaire was used for candidates and included questions on issues pertinent to each branch. Only four women were elected.

==== 1981 ====
In the 1981 election WEL changed tactics producing a pamphlet listing the biographical details and attitudes of women candidates to fertility control, abortion and childcare. The number of women MPs doubled to eight. Three of the women elected had been influential in WEL: Ruth Richardson, Marilyn Waring and Margaret Shields.

==== 1984 ====
External image
- 1984 WEL lobby pamphlet: "Only 8 women in parliament"

WEL's election pamphlet for the 1984 election emphasised the contribution of women to parliament. The number of women MPs elected totalled twelve.

==== 1987 ====
In the 1987 election, WEL focussed on making women aware of the major issues facing them: jobs, environment, Treaty of Waitangi, women in parliament, pornography, proportional representation, equal educational and employment opportunities, women's health and fertility control, dependency care and peace. Fourteen women were elected in 1987.

==== 1990s ====
In the 1990 election, sixteen women were elected; after the 1993 election there were 21 women MPs making their proportion 20%.

WEL supported the change from a first-past-the-post electoral system to mixed-member proportional representation (MMP), which would give more opportunity for women and Māori to be elected to parliament as party list candidates. In the first MMP election in 1996 the number of women increased sharply to 35. Following the election WEL continued its commitment to equity and monitoring policy promises and legislation.

=== Local government elections ===
In the October 1977 local government elections WEL encouraged women to take an interest in the elections and to make sure their names were on the electoral rolls. Over the years WEL did a lot of education to ensure women got their names on the electoral rolls and ran workshops for women wanting to stand for election to councils. The Wellington branch launched a booklet How to Take Part in Local Government, which explained what local government was and its relevance to women's lives. As a result, there was much greater acceptance of the need for women to be represented in local government and more women were elected to councils. In Here I Stand, published in time for the 1983 local government elections, women in local government outlined their experiences. In the 1986 elections a number of WEL members were successful candidates.

Between 1974 and 1980, the number of women in local government doubled. In 1983 the number of women mayors increased from six to twelve.

=== Women’s appointments ===
WEL, the National Council of Women and the Committee on Women produced a list of 200 names in 1978 of women qualified for appointment to statutory bodies. The Prime Minister Robert Muldoon responded by saying that balanced women were needed on boards, not “beady-eyed ladies who scream slogans”. There were 600 boards and of WEL's list of 100 names fewer than 5 had been appointed. The lists covered a cross section of women and WEL's stated that they were hardly “militant feminists”. Two Wellington women responded to Muldoon's comments by printing T-shirts with the slogans ‘Beady-eyed Ladies Inc.’ and ‘Slogans by request’.

As a result of the work of WEL, and other organisations, a Women's Appointment File was produced by the Ministry for Women's Affairs; this became a nominations service administered by the Ministry for Women.

=== Policy ===
In July 1978 WEL published its policy manifesto A New Look: a WEL view of some changes for New Zealand. Its purpose was to inform candidates for the 1978 general election and the general public on issues for New Zealand women.

Proposals for change in the manifesto covered seven areas:

- Early childhood services
- Education
- Employment
- Health
- Law
- Social welfare
- Town planning

The policy areas were further developed and updated during the 1980s and 1990s. In the 1980s, policies covered childcare services, education, employment, health, law, local government, finance, pornography, international and miscellaneous. By 1993 policies covered childcare services, education, employment, health, law, local government, social welfare, pornography.

=== Advocacy ===
During the 1980s and 1990s WEL was active nationally and at branch level advocating, lobbying and protesting on a number of issues of concern to women:

- the 1981 Springbok rugby tour
- the Working Women's Charter
- matrimonial property
- contraception, sterilisation and abortion
- rape
- homosexuality
- the electoral system
- promotion of a Ministry of Women's Affairs (which was established in 1984)
- promotion of a Human Rights Commission
- promotion of a nuclear-free New Zealand
- the 1991 budget, known as the Mother of all Budgets. WEL was concerned at cuts to the welfare budget and the absence of any analysis regarding the effect of the budget on women's lives. Particular concerns were the risk of a poverty trap for women and children, loss of economic independence, and the future social implications of the budget

WEL's advocacy contributed to legislative or other outcomes that addressed women's concerns.

== WEL publications ==
- How to take part in local government (1977)
- A new look : A WEL view of some changes for New Zealand (1978)
- Here I stand : The experiences of woman candidates in 1980 local body elections (1983)
- Women’s Electoral Lobby: Australia, New Zealand, 1972–1985 (1985)
- Walking backwards into the future : A collection of essays / commissioned by Women's Electoral Lobby. (1993)
- The WEL herstory : The Women's Electoral Lobby in New Zealand 1975–2002 (2003)
- National Newsletter (1977–2004)
