= Newell Orton =

British flying ace of World War II

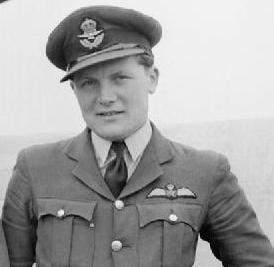
- Orton, April 1940
- Born: 1915
- Died: 17 September 1941 (aged 25–26)
- Military career
- Allegiance: United Kingdom
- Branch: Royal Air Force (1937–1941) †
- Rank: Squadron leader
- Nickname: Fanny
- Commands: No. 54 Squadron
- Conflicts: Second World War: Phoney War; Battle of France; Circus offensive
- Awards: Distinguished Flying Cross & bar

Newell Orton, DFC & Bar (1915 – 17 September 1941) was a British flying ace of the Royal Air Force (RAF) during the Second World War. He was officially credited with the destruction of 17 enemy aircraft.

Born in Warwick, Orton served in the Royal Air Force Volunteer Reserve before joining the RAF in 1937. Posted to No. 73 Squadron, he was sent to France with the squadron on the outbreak of the Second World War. He flew extensively during the Phoney War and the subsequent Battle of France. He was wounded on 15 May 1940 when his Hawker Hurricane fighter was shot down and was repatriated to England for hospital treatment for burns. In 1941, after recovering from his injuries, he was appointed commander of No. 54 Squadron and flew numerous operations during the Circus offensive until his death.

== Early life ==
Newell Orton, nicknamed Fanny, was born in 1915 in Warwick, England, and was educated locally at King's High School and then proceeding to Leamington Technical College. He joined the Royal Air Force Volunteer Reserve in 1935 and was soon a qualified pilot with the rank of sergeant. Two years later he received a short service commission in the Royal Air Force (RAF) and was posted to No. 73 Squadron as a flying officer. At the time, the squadron operated Gloster Gladiators but in July 1938, it was re-equipped with Hawker Hurricane fighters.

== Second World War ==
On 24 August 1939, as tensions escalated between Britain and Germany, No. 73 Squadron was mobilised for war. It was intended to send the squadron to France as the Air Component of the British Expeditionary Force (BEF), designated as part of No. 60 Mobile Wing along with No. 1 Squadron. On 8 September 1939, the Second World War now underway, it deployed to France. Operating from Rouvres, not far from the border with Germany, the squadron flew regular standing patrols and were involved in infrequent engagements with the Luftwaffe during the Phoney War. On 23 November, Orton helped in the shooting down of a Heinkel He 111 medium bomber and claimed another as destroyed. Towards the end of the year and into the early part of 1940, weather often affected flight operations and little action was seen.

Conditions began to improve into February and operations were more frequent the following month. On 26 March Orton shot down two Messerschmitt Bf 109 fighters near Trier. His own aircraft was damaged, reportedly by the German flying ace Werner Mölders. On 21 April he destroyed a Bf 109 that attacked his flight while it was pursuing two other enemy fighters. Later, in the same patrol, he shot down a Messerschmitt Bf 110 heavy fighter, one of a group that intercepted his flight, and damaged another. It was a successful day for the squadron, with several enemy aircraft shot down. Orton also became a flying ace, credited with five German aircraft destroyed. He was the squadron's second ace of the war, his fellow pilot Edgar Kain being the first.

=== Battle of France ===
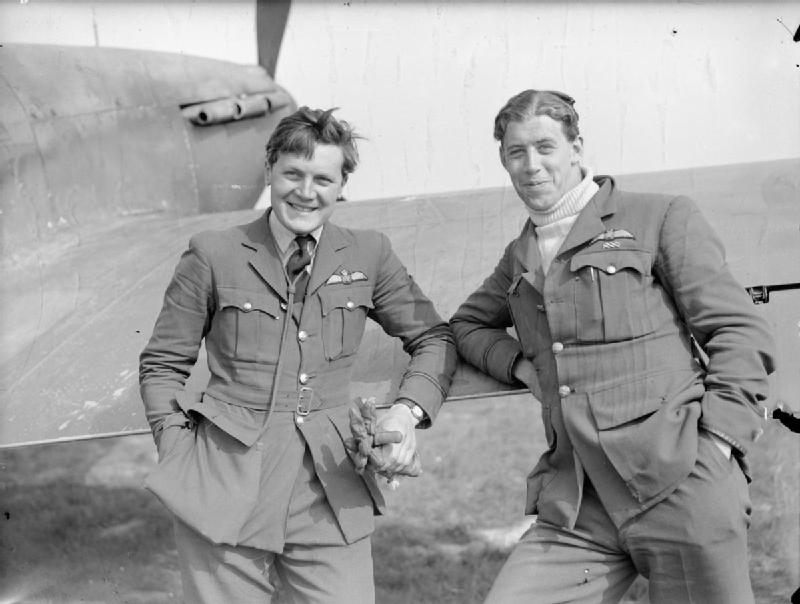
Orton, on the left, with fellow No. 73 Squadron pilot Edgar Kain

On the day of the German invasion of France, Orton and another pilot damaged a Dornier Do 17 medium bomber that had attacked the airfield at Rouvres but had to bale out after his Hurricane was damaged. Having returned to the squadron he was able to resume flying the same day. Being close to the border and exposed to bombing attacks, the squadron was moved back, to Reims-Champagne. Orton promptly shot down a Do 17 in the morning and a Bf 110 in the afternoon. Others in the squadron shot down four more German aircraft. Over the next several days, during which air operations were hectic, he shot down more enemy aircraft.

On 15 May, Orton, flying with five other Hurricanes of his squadron, was wounded during a dogfight with several Bf 110s. Having shot down two of the Bf 110s, his Hurricane was damaged and put on fire. Bailing out, Orton's parachute was caught up in trees when he landed and he had to be rescued by another RAF officer. His wounds, which included bad burns, warranted hospitalisation and ended his involvement in the Battle of France. By this time he was credited with at least 15 enemy aircraft destroyed. Two days later, in recognition of his exploits of 21 April, he was awarded the Distinguished Flying Cross (DFC) on 17 May; the citation, published in The London Gazette, read:

During April, 1940, this officer was the leader of a rear section in a patrol of nine aircraft, and in that position was allotted the important task of guarding the rear of the formation. Whilst two enemy aircraft were being pursued into Germany, he noticed other enemy aircraft at the left rear. After warning the leader of the formation, he proceeded with his section to attack the enemy, which proved to be three Messerschmitt 109's one of which he shot down in flames. Later, during the same patrol, the formation again came in action with 12 enemy aircraft and during this engagement Flying Officer Orton attacked a Messerschmitt 109 and, it is believed, destroyed it. This officer has displayed skill and determination in a number of previous combats.

— London Gazette, No. 34852, 17 May 1940.

Orton was repatriated to England and spent the next several weeks in hospital, missing the Battle of Britain. During the period of his recuperation, he was awarded a bar to the DFC on 16 July, the first of the Second World War for a No. 73 Squadron pilot. On recovery from his injuries, he was posted to No. 59 Operational Training Unit. In September he was promoted to flight lieutenant.

=== Circus offensive ===
Orton returned to active operations in July 1941, when he was posted to No. 242 Squadron on a short-term basis. He claimed a Bf 109 as probably destroyed during his service with the squadron and at the end of the month was given command of No. 54 Squadron, operating from Hornchurch. Now holding the rank of squadron leader, he regularly flew on sweeps to France as part of the RAF's Circus offensive. On 12 August, with his squadron flying as escorts to Handley Page Hampden bombers attacking the airfield at St. Omer. Unmolested as they crossed the English Channel, over France they were intercepted by a group of Bf 109s. In the ensuing dogfight Orton claimed two of these as destroyed. On 17 September the squadron, flying as part of the Hornchurch Wing, was involved in a large engagement with around 50 Bf 109s near Le Touquet. Orton was one of three pilots of the squadron that were shot down and killed. He is believed to have probably destroyed one Bf 109 before his death.

Survived by his wife Helen, Orton has no known grave and is commemorated on the Runnymede Memorial. He is credited with 17 aircraft destroyed, eight probably destroyed, and four damaged.
