= Judy Pickard =

New Zealand artist (1921–2016)

Judy Pickard QSM
- Born: Judith Ngaire Maud Kain; 19 June 1921; Hastings, New Zealand
- Died: 10 March 2016 (aged 94); Hamilton, New Zealand
- Occupations: Painter; librarian; women's rights advocate
- Known for: Abstract painting
- Spouse: Alexander Pickard (m. 1952; died 2006)
- Children: 3
- Relatives: Edgar Kain (brother)

Judith Ngaire Maud Pickard QSM (née Kain; 19 June 1921 – 10 March 2016) was a New Zealand abstract painter, librarian and advocate for women's rights.

== Early life and family ==
Pickard was born in the New Zealand city of Hastings on 19 June 1921. She was the youngest of five children, and her father imported textiles. After the family moved to Wadestown, Wellington, she attended Samuel Marsden Collegiate School.

During World War II Pickard and her mother travelled to England to join her brother, Edgar Kain, a fighter pilot with the RAF who had recently become engaged, but he died before their arrival. Pickard and her mother were presented by George VI with her brother's DFC medal on his behalf at Buckingham Palace, and Pickard joined the Women's Auxiliary Air Force. She had attained the rank of sergeant by the end of the war and was working as an instructor.

After the war, Pickard returned to New Zealand, where she completed a bachelor of arts degree at the University of Canterbury and obtained a diploma from the New Zealand Library School, becoming a librarian. In 1952, she married schoolteacher and writer Alexander Pickard, best-known by his literary pseudonym AP Gaskell, and they had three children.

== Career ==
The early years of Pickard's marriage were mainly spent in Invercargill, where her husband worked as a schoolteacher and Pickard worked at the public library; in 1960 the family moved to Hamilton. In 1961 her poem "A Long Sea Voyage" was published in the New Zealand literary journal Landfall. The family's home in Hamilton was designed by architect Ernst Plischke and completed in 1964. In the same year, she began working at the University of Waikato library.

In 1970 Pickard was appointed as the City Librarian for Hamilton. She was the first woman in the role, and the first person in that role to have a professional qualification. In this role she reorganised, relocated and expanded the library, increased the intellectual quality of its holdings, and developed a mobile library to support outer areas of the city. She retired from the position in 1981.

In retirement, Pickard had more time to spend on her abstract painting (for which she was well-known in the Waikato region), and held several exhibitions of her work including through the Waikato Society of Arts. She also engaged in political advocacy. She and her husband participated in political protests against the 1981 Springbok tour and advocated for electoral reform in New Zealand. She supported the Labour Party and was a long-time friend of Dianne Yates, who said of her, "any campaign for liberty, honesty and justice, Judy would be there".

Pickard was an active member of the Women's Electoral Lobby, serving as its Waikato co-ordinator in the 1980s and as the national co-ordinator from 1991 to 1993. She advocated for women's rights in a range of areas including abortion, rape law and school curriculums, assisted with organising the centennial of women's suffrage in New Zealand in 1993 and co-edited a book of essays by New Zealand women called Walking Backwards to the Future.

Pickard also served as a referee on New Zealand's Small Claims Tribunal, a member of the Hamilton Civic Trust, and as a member of the council of the University of Waikato. In the 2001 Queen's Birthday Honours, she was awarded the Queen's Service Medal for public services. In 2003, the Waikato Times listed her as one of 125 people who had contributed to the development of the city of Hamilton.

== Later life and death ==
Pickard was predeceased by her husband in 2006. She died at her home in Hamilton on 10 March 2016.
