= Geoffrey Pidcock =

Geoffrey Arthur Henzell Pidcock
- Born: 6 November 1897; Eastbourne, Sussex, England
- Died: 12 February 1976 (aged 78)
- Military career
- Allegiance: United Kingdom
- Branch: British Army (1916–18); Royal Air Force (1918–51)
- Service years: 1916–1951
- Rank: Air Vice Marshal
- Units: No. 60 Squadron RFC; No. 44 Squadron RFC; No. 73 Squadron RFC/RAF; No. 1 Squadron RAF; No. 19 Squadron RAF
- Commands: Director-General of Technical Services (1950–51); Director-General of Armament (1947–50); President of the Ordnance Board (1945–47); Director of Armament Development (1942–44); RAF North Coates (1937–38); No. 1 Air Observers School (1937–38); No. 55 Squadron RAF (1933)
- Conflicts: First World War: Western Front; Second World War
- Awards: Companion of the Bath; Commander of the Order of the British Empire; Legion of Honour (France); Croix de guerre (France); Commander of the Legion of Merit (United States)

Air Vice Marshal Geoffrey Arthur Henzell Pidcock, CB, CBE (6 November 1897 – 12 February 1976) was a senior officer in the Royal Air Force. After becoming a flying ace in the First World War, credited with six aerial victories, he remained in the newly created Royal Air Force after the war, serving as a senior officer during the Second World War and specializing in the development of armaments. He retired in 1951.

== Early life and education ==
Pidcock was born in Eastbourne, Sussex, and was educated at St Cyprian's School there, and then at Haileybury College, Hertfordshire, from 1911. He left school in February 1915, and joined the Royal Flying Corps as a cadet in April 1916.

== First World War ==
Pidcock completed his basic flight training, and was awarded Royal Aero Club Aviators' Certificate No. 3259 on 17 July 1916, being commissioned as a second lieutenant (on probation) the same day. He was appointed a flying officer on 4 August, and was confirmed in his rank on 24 August. Although posted to No. 60 Squadron in August 1916, he did not gain his first aerial victory until 5 April 1917, when flying a Nieuport 17 he shared in the driving down out of control of an Albatros D.III over Riencourt with five other pilots. Soon after, on 14 April, he was appointed a flight commander with the temporary rank of captain, and shortly afterwards returned to England, where he was transferred to No. 44 Squadron on Home Defence duties. In October 1917 he was posted to the Fighter Instructors' Refresher Course, and on 17 December 1917 was promoted to lieutenant.

Pidcock returned to France in March 1918, posted to No. 73 Squadron, flying the Sopwith Camel, and soon after, on 1 April, the Army's Royal Flying Corps and the Royal Naval Air Service were merged to form the Royal Air Force. A week later, on 7 April, Pidcock drove down a Fokker Dr.I north of Lamotte, and on the 12th he destroyed an Albatros D.V over Lestrem. On 3 May he drove down another D.V over Ploegsteert, and on 11 June gained his fifth victory by destroying another D.V north-east of Courcelles, earning his "ace" status. Two days later, on 13 June, he shared in the destruction of a Type C reconnaissance aircraft south of Thiescourt. On 23 September he was awarded the Croix de guerre by France.

== Inter-war career ==
Pidcock remained in the Royal Air Force after the end of the war, being granted a short service commission with the rank of flying officer on 24 October 1919. He was sent to India in early 1920 to serve in No. 1 Squadron, and on 1 January 1922 he was promoted to flight lieutenant. On 6 March 1923 his short service commission was made permanent, and he was then posted to the headquarters of Iraq Command on 23 March, as a supernumerary officer on administrative duties. He returned to the Home Establishment on 13 November 1923, temporarily assigned to the RAF Depot, until posted to No. 19 Squadron, based at Duxford, on 15 December. On 18 August 1924 Pidcock was posted to the Armament and Gunnery School at Eastchurch, then on 27 February 1925 to the Staff at the headquarters of No. 7 Group at Andover, then to the headquarters of the Wessex Bombing Area on 12 April 1926. On 22 October 1928 he joined the Air Staff at the Directorate of Training, based at the Air Ministry in London, and there on 25 July 1929 he married Evelyn Catherine Watkin (née Hardacre), widow of Hugh Watkin.

Pidcock was promoted to squadron leader on 14 May 1930, and returned to Iraq to command No. 55 Squadron, based at Hinaidi, until 17 June 1933. On 26 August he was appointed Armament Officer at the Aeroplane and Armament Experimental Establishment at Martlesham Heath, serving there until 1 January 1935, and on 21 January he returned to Eastchurch to serve as an Armament Officer at the Air Armament School there. On 1 January 1937 Pidcock was promoted to wing commander, and on 2 August was appointed Officer Commanding of No. 1 Air Observers School at North Coates Fitties.

== Second World War ==
On 28 September 1939, soon after the declaration of war on Germany, Pidcock was appointed Assistant Director Armament (Bombs), and served as a member of the Ordnance Board, based at the Royal Arsenal at Woolwich. On 1 January 1940 he was appointed a temporary group captain, and on 24 April was transferred to the RAF Technical Branch.

On 1 December 1941 he was appointed a temporary air commodore, and in February 1942 was appointed Director of Armament Development at the Ministry of Aircraft Production, where he was involved in the introduction of a number of new weapons. These included the RP-3 rocket projectile, the Hurricane Mk IID "tank-buster" equipped with the 40 mm Vickers S cannon, the Mosquito FB Mk XVIII Tsetse equipped with the Molins 6-pounder gun, and the "Tallboy" and "Grand Slam" earthquake bombs. On 14 April 1942 he was promoted to group captain, while still holding the temporary rank of air commodore,

In January 1944 Pidcock was appointed vice-president of the Ordnance Board at the Ministry of Supply, and on 1 May was appointed an acting air vice-marshal. On 1 May 1945 he was granted the war substantive rank of air commodore, and in August 1945 was appointed President of the Ordnance Board.

== Post-war career ==
Following the end of the war, Pidcock was made a Commander of the Order of the British Empire (CBE) on 1 January 1946, and the same day he appointed a temporary air vice-marshal. On 5 November 1946 Pidcock was granted permission to wear the insignia of a Commander of the Legion of Merit which has been conferred on him by the United States, and presented to him in October by the military attaché Major-General Clayton Lawrence Bissell "for exceptional meritorious service as Director of Armament Development."

On 1 July 1947 he was promoted to air vice-marshal, and on 14 October was appointed Director-General of Armament at the Air Ministry. On 1 January 1948 Pidcock was made a Companion of the Order of the Bath (CB). By 1950 he was serving as Director-General of Technical Services, and on 23 April 1951 retired at own request.

Pidcock died on 12 February 1976.

== Bibliography ==
- Shores, Christopher F.; Franks, Norman & Guest, Russell F. (1990). Above the Trenches: a Complete Record of the Fighter Aces and Units of the British Empire Air Forces 1915–1920. London, UK: Grub Street. ISBN 978-0-948817-19-9.
