= Emile John Lussier =

American flying ace during World War I

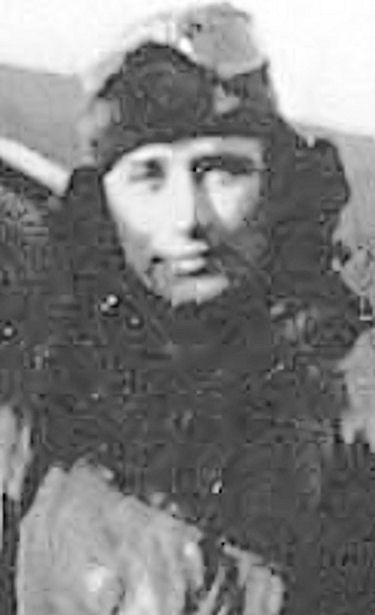
- Emile John Lussier, 1918
- Born: 10 October 1895; Chicago, Illinois, USA
- Died: 11 December 1974 (aged 79); Westminster, Maryland, USA
- Military career
- Allegiance: United States
- Branch: Royal Air Force (United Kingdom)
- Rank: Captain
- Unit: Royal Air Force: No. 73 Squadron RAF
- Conflicts: World War I
- Awards: British Distinguished Flying Cross
- Other work: Served in Royal Canadian Air Force in World War II

Captain Emile John Lussier was an American flying ace during World War I. He was credited with eleven confirmed aerial victories while flying with the Royal Air Force.

== Early life ==
Emile John Lussier was the son of Joseph Emile and Louise Swalwell Lussier. The younger Lussier was born in Chicago on 10 October 1895, and reared there until age fifteen. In 1910, Joseph Lussier moved to Winnipeg to take up a job constructing railroad stations throughout western Canada, and his teenage son went with him. Consequently, he has often been dubbed a French Canadian.

== Military service ==
When World War I began, Emile John Lussier claimed Medicine Hat as his home. He enlisted in the Royal Flying Corps in late 1917. Once trained, he was stationed with No. 73 Squadron RFC as a Sopwith Camel pilot.

Lussier did not score his first wins until 25 July 1918, when he destroyed a Fokker D.VII and drove another down out of control. Five days later, he teamed with Norman Cooper and another pilot to destroy an LVG reconnaissance plane. On 8 August, he downed another German two-seater, sharing it with Gavin L. Graham and Robert Chandler. Then, beginning with the win that made him an ace on 19 August, he ran off a string of seven victories over Fokker D.VII fighters that took him to 11 October 1918. In total, he destroyed three Fokker D.VIIs and driven down six others out of control. There were also the two shared wins over reconnaissance planes.

== Post World War I ==
Lussier moved back to the United States after the war; there he discovered he was considered a natural born American. He became a farmer in Westminster, Maryland, raising four daughters, including Betty Ann Lussier, who became an ATA pilot and early member of the OSS. As World War II was beginning, and the U.S. was still neutral, he joined the Royal Canadian Air Force as a squadron leader involved with radio training. At war's end, he once again returned to his Maryland farm. He died there on 11 December 1974.

Emile John Lussier is buried in plot X-318, Westminster Cemetery, Westminster, Maryland.

== Honors and awards ==
Distinguished Flying Cross (DFC)

Lt. Emile John Lussier.

Lussier was awarded the Distinguished Flying Cross in November 1918. His award citation credited him with destroying or forcing down out of control seven enemy aircraft alone, including three in a single day, and sharing credit for two more alongside two other pilots. The citation praised his willingness to attack even when enemy aircraft outnumbered his own side.

== See also ==
- List of World War I flying aces from the United States

== Bibliography ==
- American Aces of World War I. (2001) Norman Franks, Harry Dempsey. Osprey Publishing. ISBN 1-84176-375-6, ISBN 978-1-84176-375-0.
- Intrepid Woman, Betty Lussier's Secret War, 1942-1945. (2010) Lussier, Betty. U.S. Naval Institute Press ISBN 1591144493
- Over the Front: A Complete Record of the Fighter Aces and Units of the United States and French Air Services, 1914-1918 (1992). Norman L. R. Franks, Frank W. Bailey. Grub Street. ISBN 0-948817-54-2, ISBN 978-0-948817-54-0.
