= Gaye =

- Commune
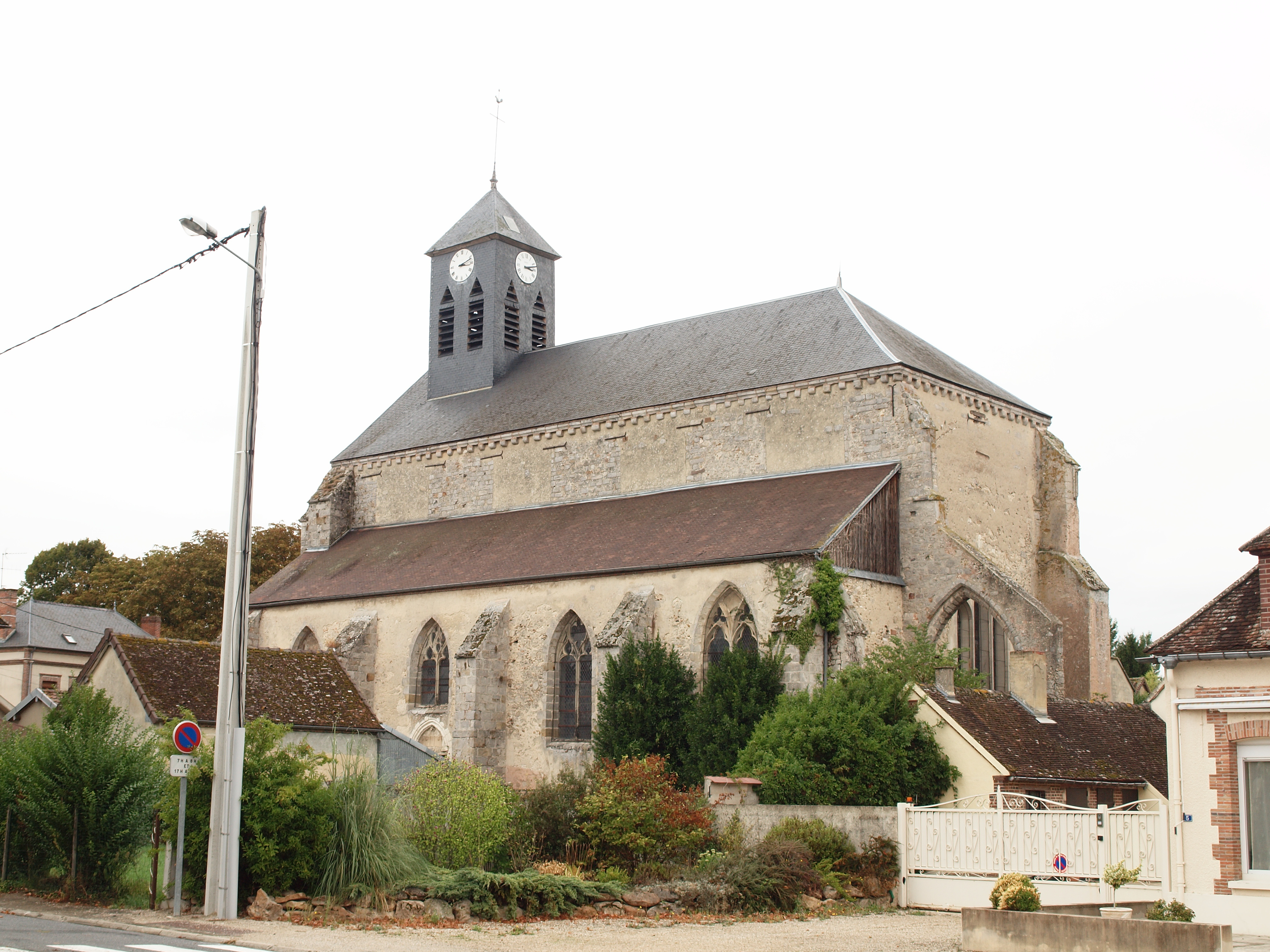
- The church in Gaye

- Coat of arms
- Location of Gaye
- Location within France Location within Grand Est
- Coordinates: 48°41′02″N 3°48′11″E
- Country: France
- Region: Grand Est
- Department: Marne
- Arrondissement: Épernay
- Canton: Sézanne-Brie et Champagne

Government
  - Mayor (2021–2026): Brigitte Leroy
- Area^{1}: 21.13 km^{2} (8.16 sq mi)
- Elevation: 110 m (360 ft)
- Population (2023): 564
  - Density: 26.7/km^{2} (69.1/sq mi)
- Time zone: UTC+01:00 (CET)
  - Summer (DST): UTC+02:00 (CEST)
- INSEE/Postal code: 51265 /51120
- ^{1} French Land Register data, which excludes lakes, ponds, glaciers > 1 km^{2} (0.386 sq mi or 247 acres) and river estuaries.

Gaye (French pronunciation: [ɡɛ]) is a commune in the Marne department in north-eastern France.

== See also ==
- Communes of the Marne department
