= Échemines =

Commune in Grand Est, France

- Commune
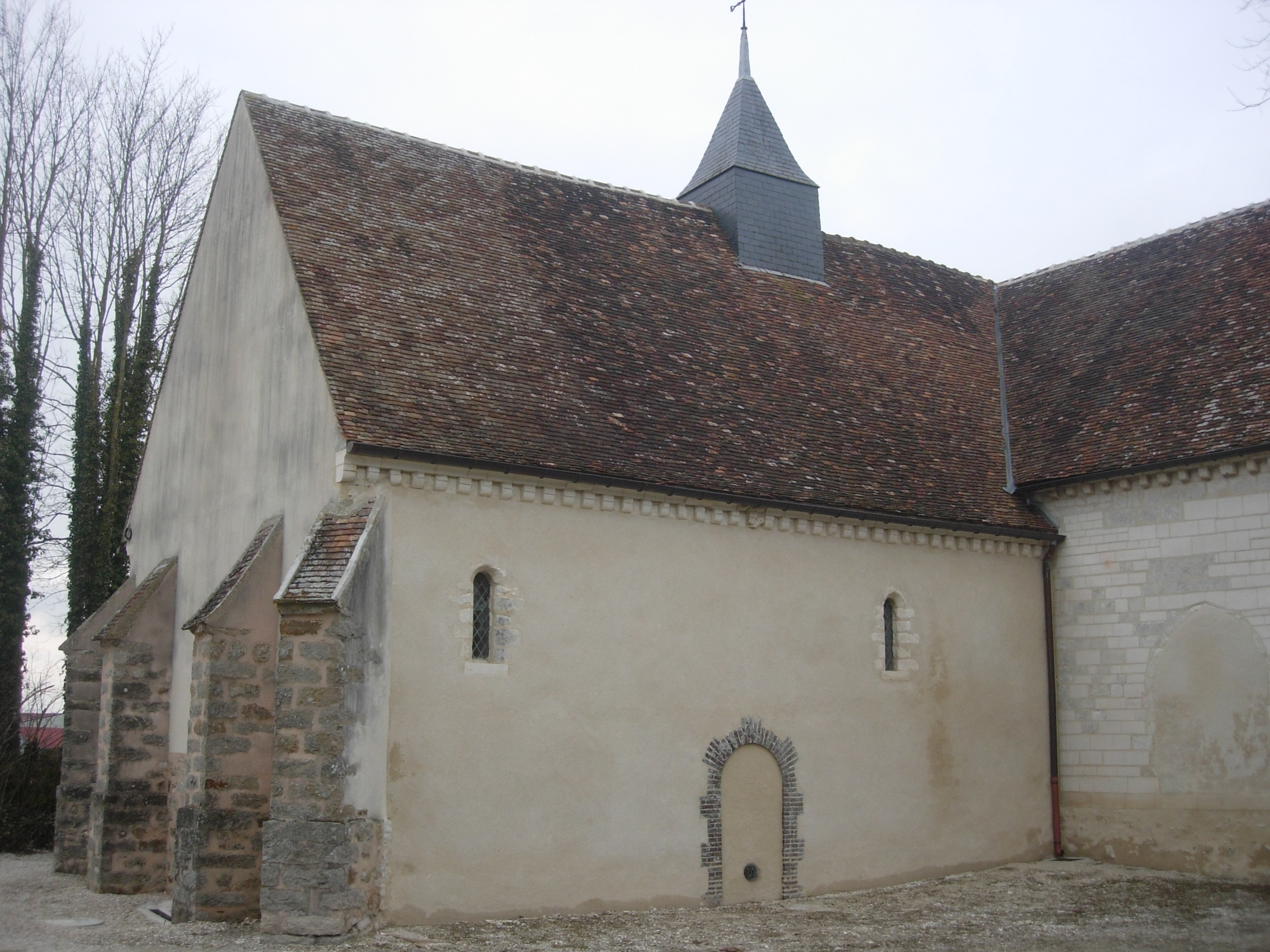
- The church in Échemines
- Location of Échemines
- Location within France Location within Grand Est
- Coordinates: 48°23′20″N 3°50′01″E
- Country: France
- Region: Grand Est
- Department: Aube
- Arrondissement: Nogent-sur-Seine
- Canton: Saint-Lyé
- Intercommunality: l'Orvin et l'Ardusson

Government
  - Mayor (2020–2026): Jean-Michel Valton
- Area^{1}: 18.2 km^{2} (7.0 sq mi)
- Elevation: 75 m (246 ft)
- Population (2023): 82
  - Density: 4.5/km^{2} (12/sq mi)
- Time zone: UTC+01:00 (CET)
  - Summer (DST): UTC+02:00 (CEST)
- INSEE/Postal code: 10134 /10350
- ^{1} French Land Register data, which excludes lakes, ponds, glaciers > 1 km^{2} (0.386 sq mi or 247 acres) and river estuaries.

Échemines (French pronunciation: [eʃmin]) is a commune in the Aube department in north-central France and located 121 kilometers from Paris.

== Population ==
Historical population
| Year | Pop. | ±% p.a. |
|---|---|---|
| 1968 | 72 | — |
| 1975 | 70 | −0.40% |
| 1982 | 73 | +0.60% |
| 1990 | 82 | +1.46% |
| 1999 | 85 | +0.40% |
| 2007 | 82 | −0.45% |
| 2012 | 94 | +2.77% |
| 2017 | 94 | +0.00% |
| 2023 | 82 | −2.25% |
Source: INSEE

== See also ==
- Communes of the Aube department
