= Oulchy-le-Château =

- Commune
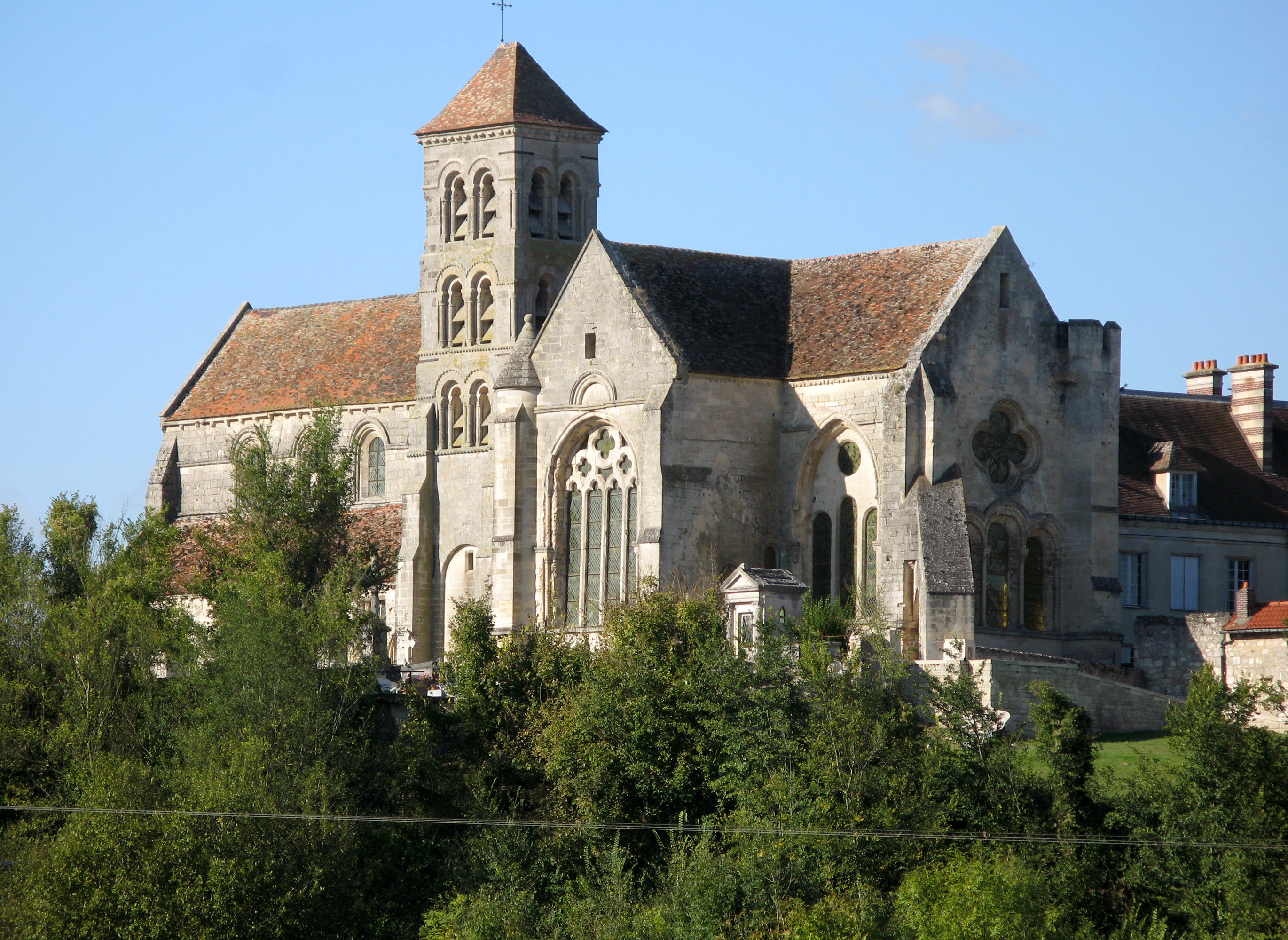
- The church of Oulchy-le-Château

- Coat of arms
- Location of Oulchy-le-Château
- Location within France Location within Hauts-de-France
- Coordinates: 49°12′18″N 3°22′09″E
- Country: France
- Region: Hauts-de-France
- Department: Aisne
- Arrondissement: Soissons
- Canton: Villers-Cotterêts
- Intercommunality: Oulchy le Château

Government
  - Mayor (2026–32): Philippe Meurs
- Area^{1}: 15.08 km^{2} (5.82 sq mi)
- Elevation: 83 m (272 ft)
- Highest elevation: 178 m (584 ft)
- Lowest elevation: 87 m (285 ft)
- Population (2023): 785
  - Density: 52.1/km^{2} (135/sq mi)
- Time zone: UTC+01:00 (CET)
  - Summer (DST): UTC+02:00 (CEST)
- INSEE/Postal code: 02580 /02210
- ^{1} French Land Register data, which excludes lakes, ponds, glaciers > 1 km^{2} (0.386 sq mi or 247 acres) and river estuaries.

Oulchy-le-Château is a commune in the Aisne department in Hauts-de-France in northern France.

== Geography ==
The town is located about 106 km (66 mi) from Paris, between Soissons to the north and Château-Thierry to the south. It is directly accessible by highway.

=== Towns, villages and localities ===
- Cugny-lès-Crouttes, located to the east

== History ==
On the night of 2/3 March 1814, the area was taken by imperial troops commanded by Captain Parquin. In 1976, the commune of Cugny-lès-Crouttes was absorbed.

== Population ==
Historical population
Year	Pop.	±% p.a.
1968	721	—
1975	759	+0.74%
1982	788	+0.54%
1990	856	+1.04%
1999	849	−0.09%
2007	853	+0.06%
2012	829	−0.57%
2017	823	−0.15%
2023	785	−0.78%
Source: INSEE

== Sights ==
- War memorial, on which 41 names are inscribed
- War memorial of Cugny-lès-Crouttes, on which 5 names are inscribed
- Monument in memory of Captain Parquin
- Many public baths
- The Ghosts of Landowski - 1919-1935 by Paul Landowski. This group consists of 7 stone soldiers, 8 meters (26 ft) high, each reflecting a weapon and erected on Chalmont hill at the site of the Second battle of the Marne.

== Personalities ==
- Gérard Titus-Carmel, painter and poet, lived and worked in the commune for more than thirty years

== Economics and sports ==
The village contains a bakery, supermarket, butcher shops, pharmacy, doctor, nightclub, police, garage and gasoline. The town contains a football stadium and two tennis courts.

== See also ==
- Communes of the Aisne department
- List of medieval bridges in France
