= Hilbert Leigh Bair =

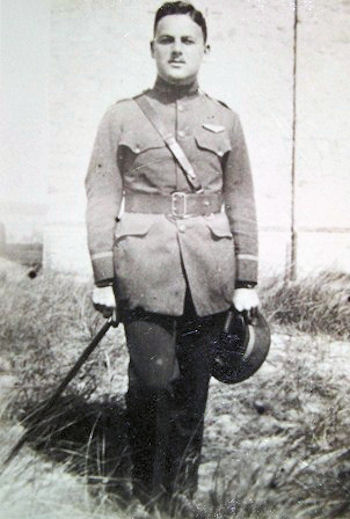
- Hilbert Leigh Bair, 1918
- Born: 15 November 1894; New York City, New York, United States
- Died: 24 November 1985 (aged 91); Hawaii, USA
- Burial place: Section CT2-D, Row 400, Site 423, National Memorial Cemetery of the Pacific, Honolulu, Hawaii
- Military career
- Allegiance: United States
- Branch: Royal Air Force (United Kingdom); Air Service, United States Army
- Rank: Lieutenant
- Units: Royal Air Force: No. 24 Squadron RAF; Air Service, United States Army: 25th Aero Squadron
- Conflicts: World War I World War II
- Awards: American Distinguished Service Cross, British Distinguished Flying Cross
- Other work: Returned to service for World War II

Lieutenant (later Lieutenant Colonel) Hilbert Leigh Bair was a World War I flying ace credited with six aerial victories.

== Military career ==
Bair joined the U.S. Army Air Service on 18 July 1917. He was forwarded to the Royal Air Force for seasoning, and was assigned to 24 Squadron on 5 July 1918. On 22 August, he shared his first win with fellow ace William Lambert and other pilots, driving a Fokker D.VII. Bair shared one of his two 29 August victories with another pilot. The next day, Bair and Horace Barton cooperated in the destruction of an Albatros reconnaissance plane. Bair singlehandedly destroyed a Fokker D.VII on 8 September. A week later, for his last triumph, he again teamed with Barton in the destruction of a Hannover recon plane. In October, Bair transferred back to an American unit, the 25th Aero Squadron.

In World War II, Hilbert Bair returned to service in the U.S. Army Air Force as a lieutenant colonel.

== See also ==
- List of World War I flying aces from the United States
- 25th Aero Squadron
- Reed G. Landis
- Frederick Ernest Luff
- Eugene Hoy Barksdale

== Bibliography ==
Above the Trenches: a Complete Record of the Fighter Aces and Units of the British Empire Air Forces 1915-1920. Christopher F. Shores, Norman L. R. Franks, Russell Guest. Grub Street, 1990. ISBN 0-948817-19-4, ISBN 978-0-948817-19-9.
