= Bair =

Bair may refer to:

- Bair (surname), a surname
- Bair Badënov (born 1976), Russian archer
- Bair Island, an area in Redwood City, California, United States
- Bair, Croatia, a village in Croatia
- Bair, Bitola, a quarter of Bitola city, North Macedonia
- Bair, Sarawak, a settlement in Sarawak, Malaysia
- Bair Machine Company of Lincoln, Nebraska, a defunct manufacturer of handloading equipment
- Bair (fruit)
