= Bair (surname) =

Bair is a surname. Notable people with the surname include:

- Brandon Bair (born 1984), American football player
- Charles M. Bair (1857–1943), American businessman
- Dale Bair, United States Marine Corps officer
- Deirdre Bair, American writer
- Donald Bair, American politician
- Doug Bair (born 1949), American baseball player
- Hilbert Bair (1894–1985), American World War I flying ace
- Margaret H. Bair, United States Air Force general
- Matthew Bair, known professionally as Matthew Koma, American songwriter and musician.
- Michael Bair, American comic book artist
- Molly Bair (born 1997), American model
- Myrna L. Bair (1940–2024), American educator and politician
- Philomena Bair (born 1996), Austrian skier
- RaNae Bair (1943–2021), American javelin thrower
- Sheila Bair (born 1954), American businesswoman
- Steve Bair (born 1958), American politician
- Theo Bair (born 1999), Canadian soccer player
