= 25th Aero Squadron =

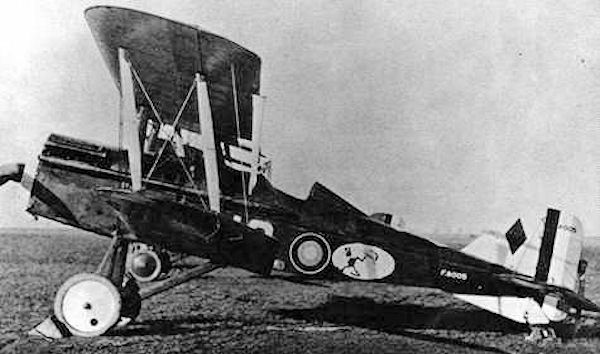
- Austin-built 25th Aero Squadron British S.E.5a, British s/n F8005, with 200 hp Wolseley Viper engine, Gengault Aerodrome, Toul, France, November 1918
- Active: 7 May 1917 – 17 June 1919
- Country: United States
- Branch: United States Army Air Service
- Type: Squadron
- Role: Pursuit
- Part of: American Expeditionary Forces (AEF)
- Engagements: World War I

Commanders
- Notable commanders: Maj. Reed G. Landis

Insignia
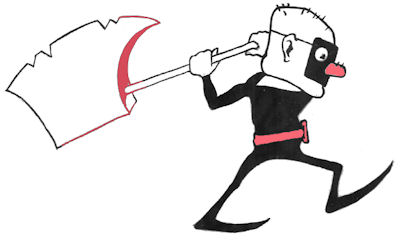
- 25th Aero Squadron Emblem

Aircraft flown
- Fighter: Royal Aircraft Factory S.E.5A, 1918–1919

Service record
- Operations: 4th Pursuit Group; Western Front, France: 22 October-11 November 1918: 2 Sorties into enemy territory, one each on 10 and 11 November 1918. No combat engaged in.

The 25th Aero Squadron was a United States Army Air Service unit that fought on the Western Front during World War I.

The squadron was assigned as a Day Pursuit (Fighter) Squadron as part of the 4th Pursuit Group, Second United States Army. Its mission was to engage and clear enemy aircraft from the skies and provide escort to reconnaissance and bombardment squadrons over enemy territory.

The squadron saw limited combat, and with Second Army's planned offensive drive on Metz cancelled due to the 1918 Armistice with Germany, the squadron returned to the United States in June 1919 and was demobilized .

The current United States Air Force unit which holds its lineage and history is the 25th Space Range Squadron, based at Schriever Air Force Base, Colorado and assigned to the Nevada Test & Training Range. On March 31, 2020, it was announced that the 25th would be moved to the newly formed United States Space Force. This transfer will make the 25th the oldest unit in the USSF.

== History ==
=== Origins ===
A detail of men from the 3d Aero Squadron at Fort Sam Houston, Texas, was assigned to the new Kelly Field on 7 May 1917 to erect tents for the First Provisional Recruit Regiment. The next day, after a sufficient number of tents were put up, what became the 25th Aero Squadron began being quartered in Row "G". On 10 May, the first formation of men was held. Between 11 May and 13 June, the men of Row G went through the usual recruit training, a minute allowance of drill and a large portion of fatigue, such as digging ditches, latrines, excavation for road-building, erection of wooden barracks and performing guard duty on what became Kelly Field #1. Quite a few of the buildings erected on the field were the handiwork of the squadron. On 13 June, the unit was formally organized and given the designation of "20th Aero Squadron", however, due to a clerical error, the designation had been allocated to another unit, the squadron was re-designated as the "25th Aero Squadron" on 22 June.

On 1 July, equipment of all kinds was issued to the men, including uniforms, rifles, ammunition belts, but no aircraft. On the 15th, an old Curtiss RE-2 aircraft was parked in front of the squadron. Training was held on repair and rigging this aircraft, and on the 26th, the squadron was moved from their row of tents into one of the new wooden barracks which they had helped to erect. Further instruction on aircraft maintenance continued, and on 15 September, several crews from the squadron were sent over to the airfield to take charge of some Curtiss JN-4As and LWS, which were flying daily from Kelly Field #1.

Training continued through the months of October and November at Kelly Field. On 9 December, the squadron was ready to be sent overseas and was ordered to proceed to the Aviation Concentration Center, Garden City, Long Island. The squadron, however, did not depart Kelly Field until 28 December, arriving in New York on 3 January 1918. The time spent in Garden City was short, as on 9 January, the squadron took a short train trip to Hoboken, New Jersey and boarded the RMS Carmania, bound for Liverpool, England. The voyage across the Atlantic was uneventful, the squadron arriving in Liverpool on 24 January. A train was taken south to Winchester, where the 25th Aero Squadron was assigned to the Romsey Rest Camp.

=== Training in England ===
At Winchester, it was learned that the squadron would be assigned to the British Royal Flying Corps for advanced training before being sent to the front in France. It boarded a train, first proceeding to London, then changing there, took another train to Scotland, arriving at RFC Ayr at 9:00am on 31 January. At Ayr, the squadron was assigned to the #1 School of Aerial Fighting. After several weeks of intense training by the RFC, the British trainers determined that the squadron was perfectly capable of doing the work they were assigned. The men were divided into different flights, and were given the assignments of maintaining Sopwith Pups, Sopwith Camels, SE.5s, Sopwith Dolphins, French SPADs, Avro 504s, Bristol Fighters and Bristol monoplanes. Also a captured German Albatros was sent there for instructional purposes. On 23 April, the squadron was ordered to proceed to the #2 School of Aerial Fighting, RFC Marske-by-the-Sea, England for further training. There, given the scarcity of British aircraft mechanics, a large majority of the men of the 25th were pressed into service to support the station's operations. Finally, in early August, the squadron, being eager to get to the front, was ordered to proceed to France, leaving on 7 August for the Romney Rest Camp at Winchester. However, due to delays, the 25th did not reach the port of Le Havre until the afternoon of 16 August.

=== Western Front ===
After several days at Rest Camp #4, the 25th Aero Squadron boarded a French troop train bound for the Replacement Concentration Center, AEF, St. Maixent Replacement Barracks on 18 August for equipping, and personnel processing. Then on the 27th, it moved again to the Air Service Production Center No. 2. at Romorantin Aerodrome, arriving on the 29th. There, the squadron went back to performing the same work it was doing at Kelly Field, that of ten hours of fatigue work each day, unloading steel from cars and placing it in piles. It continued this until 16 September when they departed for the 1st Air Depot at Colombey-les-Belles Airdrome.

At Colombey the squadron was finally classified as a Pursuit Squadron, and also began to receive pursuit pilots. Many of the pilots had been trained in England and had been attached to British squadrons, flying Royal Aircraft Factory S.E.5s over the lines. During its time in England, the 25th had gained much experience in maintaining S.E.5s, and it was delighted to learn it would be the first American Squadron to be equipped with the British aircraft. However, the S.E.5s which it would be equipped were intended to be fitted with American license-built Hispano-Suiza 8 engines manufactured by Wright Aeronautical. The planes were being assembled by the Austin Motor Company, in Birmingham and Coventry, England and several flying officers were sent to England to ferry the planes to the front. However, this did not proceed as quickly as was hoped, as delays in the delivery of the aircraft in England and with one aircraft being flown to the American Air Acceptance Park #1 at Orly Field, it was held for an engine overhaul, a thorough examination and it needed to be equipped with armament.

On 24 October, the squadron was moved to Croix de Metz Aerodrome, near Toul, where the squadron was assigned to the Second Army Air Service, 4th Pursuit Group. The 141st Aero Squadron of the group was already operating over the lines with SPAD XIIIs, but the 25th was still awaiting aircraft. The next ten days were spent on camp duty awaiting the problems with its aircraft being sorted out. Finally, on 1 November, the first S.E.5 was delivered to the squadron, with the second aircraft being delivered the next day. Deliveries of the planes continued, although at a slow pace though November until the full complement of twenty-one planes was received by the end of the month.

On 10 November, the 25th Aero Squadron made its first flight over the lines, joining with the 4th Pursuit Group in a hunting expedition in front of Metz, with many of the 25th's S.E. 5as missing their "overhead" mount Lewis machine guns. No enemy aircraft were seen, but the squadron bombed German targets in Metz with twenty-pound bombs each pilot carried on their lap. This patrol qualified the squadron as an aerial pursuit unit operating on the front. The morning of the 11th saw another patrol being made over the front, being in the air at the time of the Armistice with Germany. However, again no enemy aircraft were seen, no bombs dropped and no rounds were fired by the squadron. One of the 25th's new pilots flying on the 10th and 11th was Philadelphia-born Joseph E. "Child Yank" Boudwin, the former wingman of Royal Air Force ace pilot Andrew Beauchamp-Proctor, when both men (often with Hugh Saunders as the other wingman to Beauchamp-Proctor) flew S.E.5as with No. 84 Squadron RAF from Bertangles, in the summer of 1918.

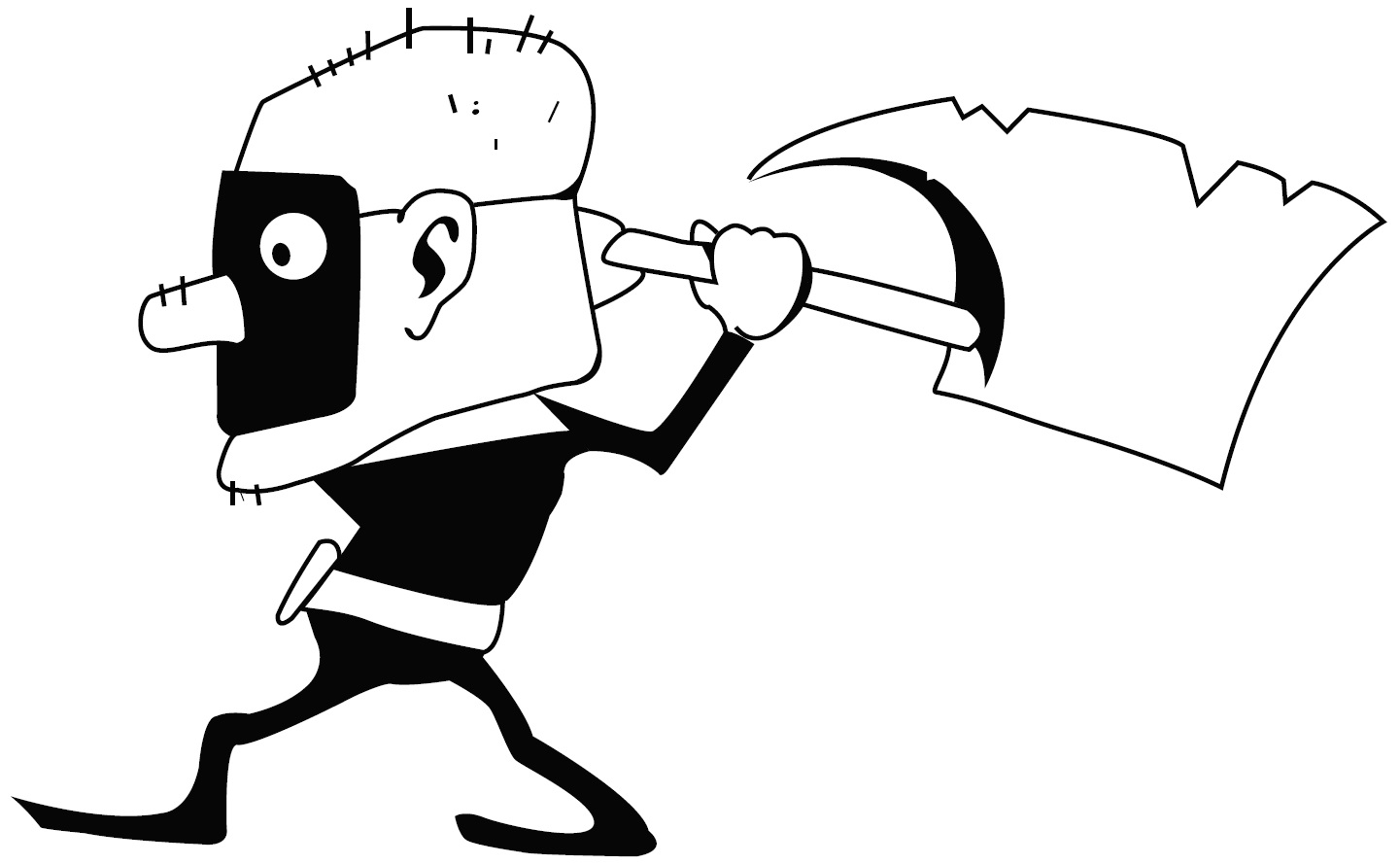
Computer image based on the 25th AS original Executioner. 1918

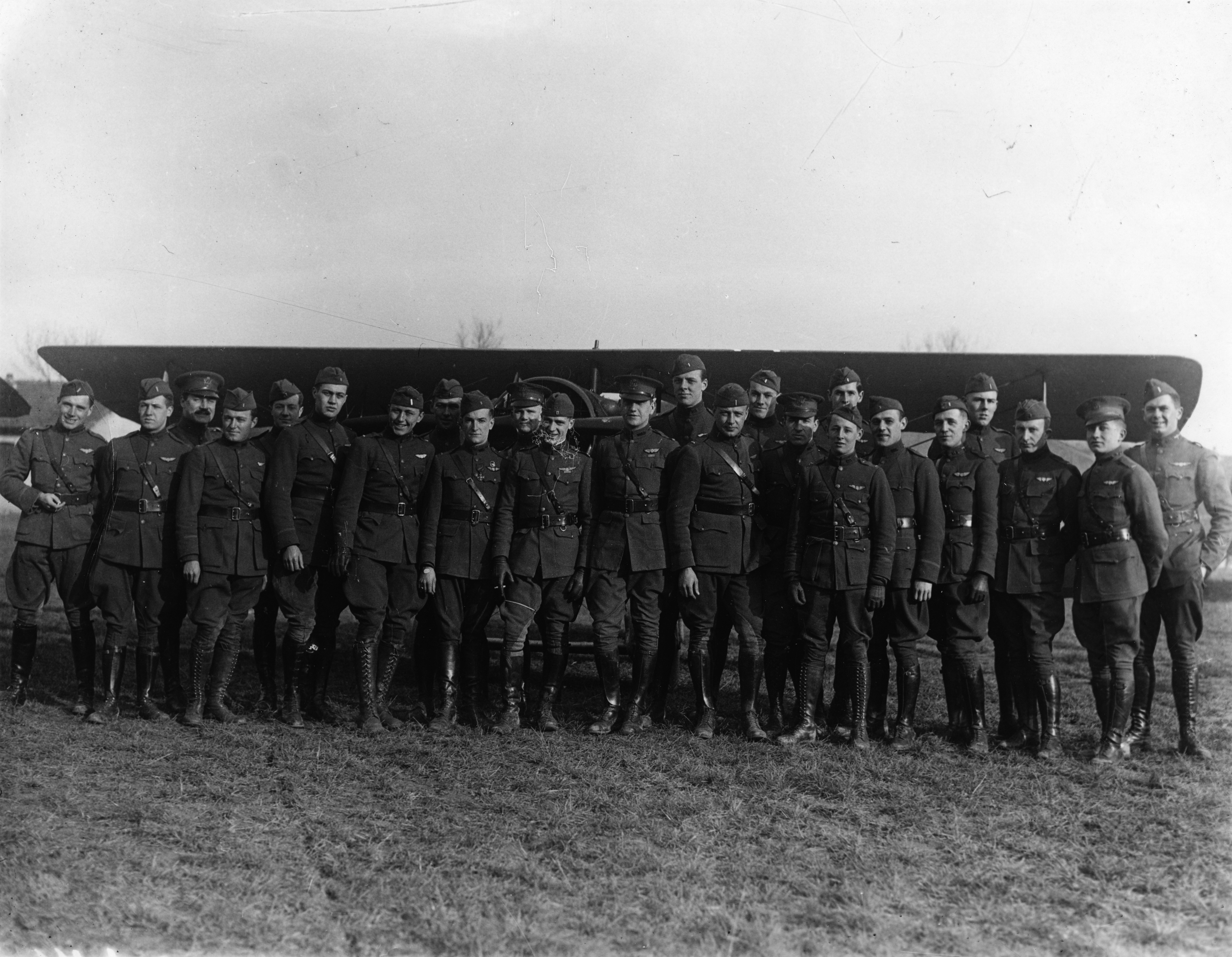
25th AS pilots. Squadron did not have their own aircraft at this time. Pictured is most likely a sister squadron SPAD aircraft. Date unknown.

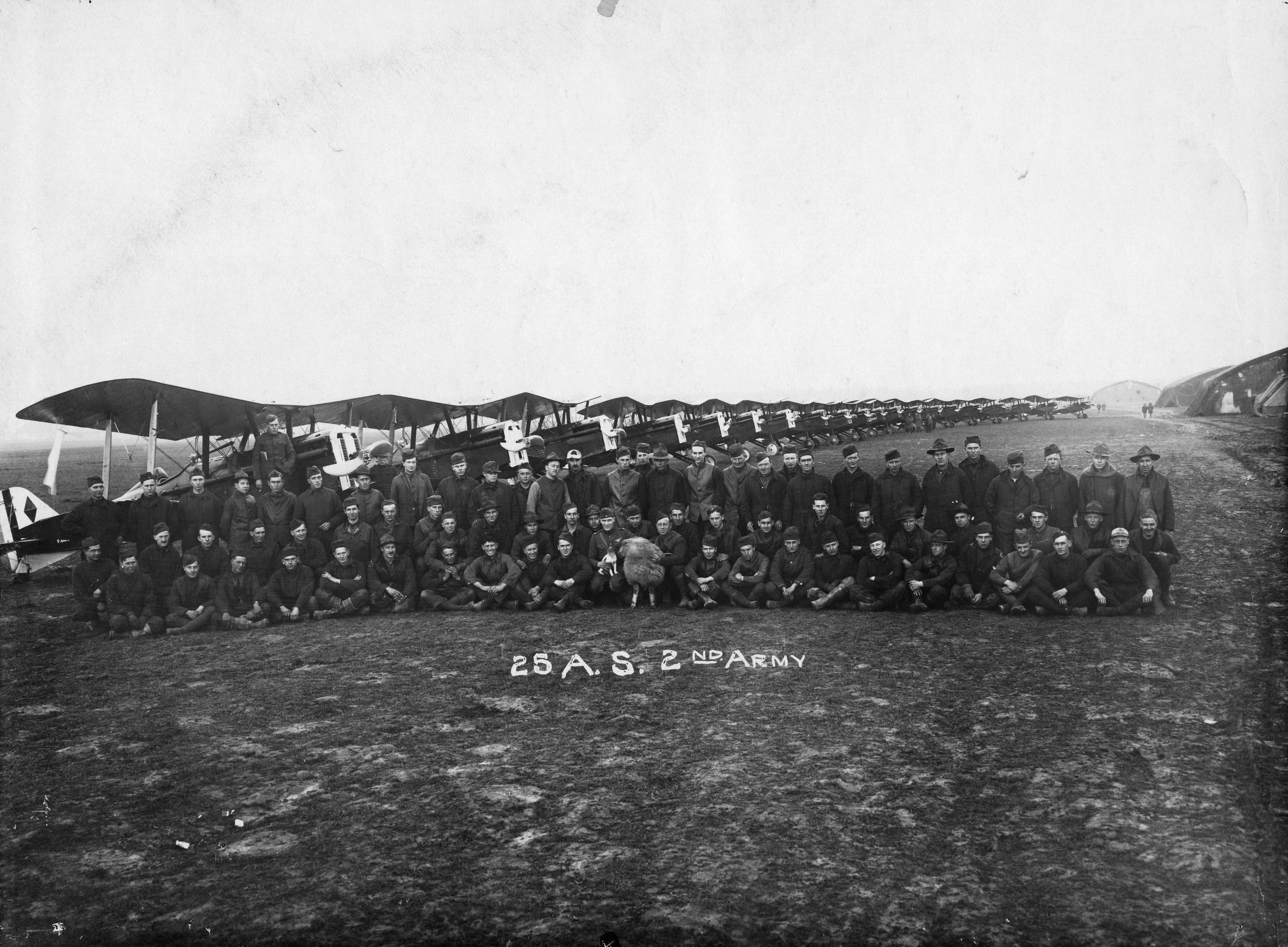
25th AS and S.E.5a aircraft

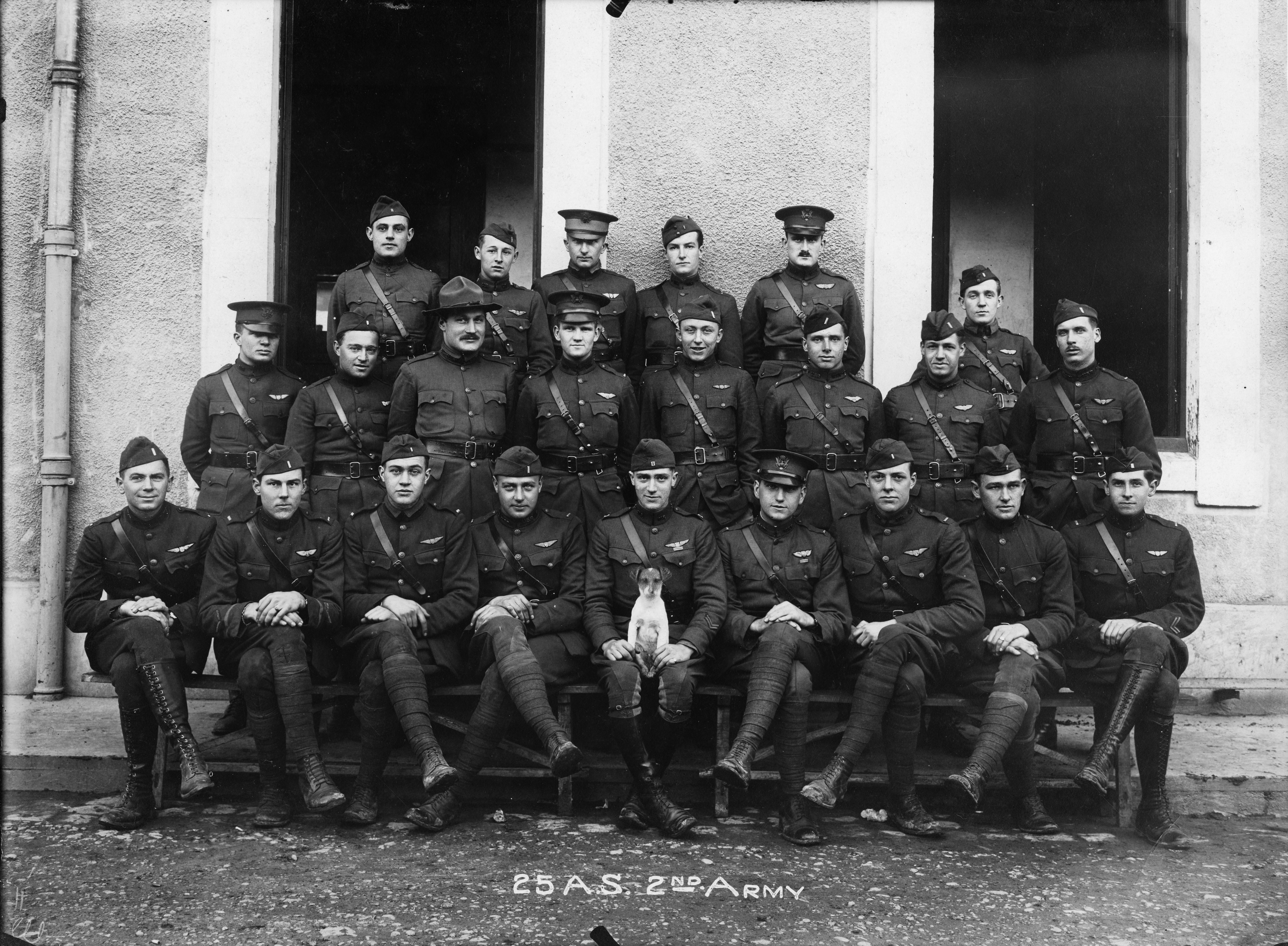
25th AS Officer Corps 1918

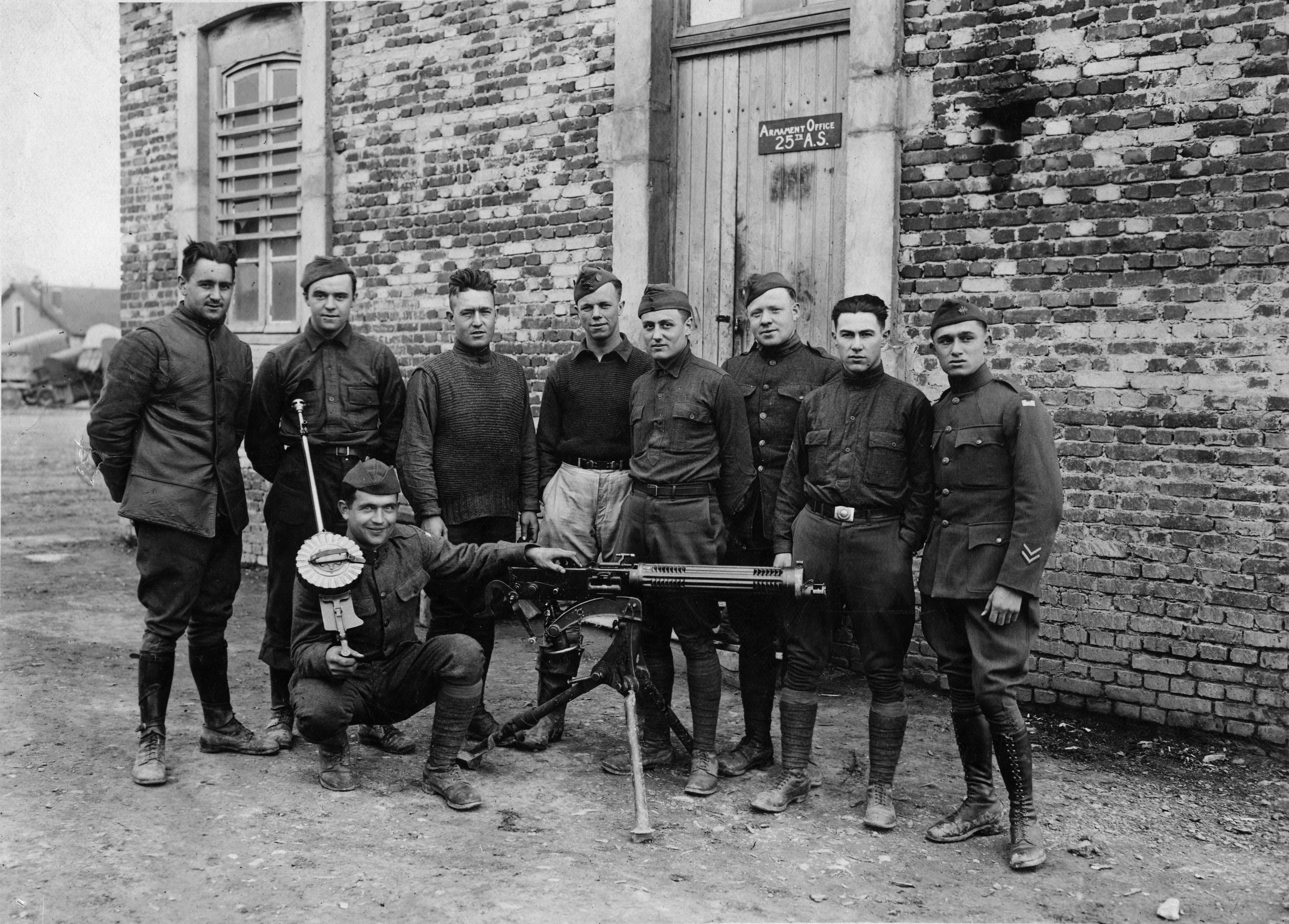
25th AS Armament Shop 1918

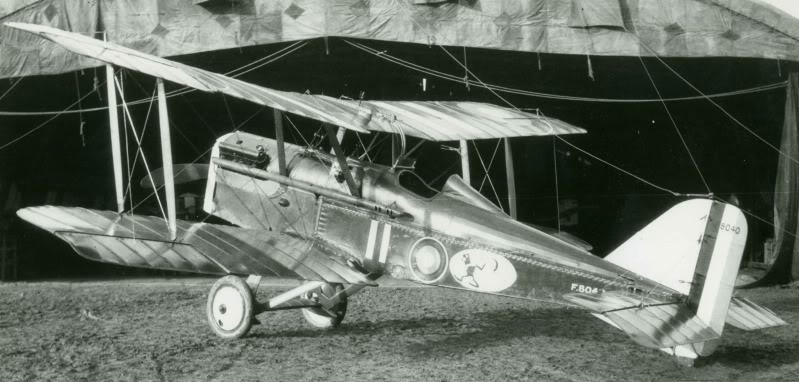
25th AS SE5a aircraft #11, British s/n F8040

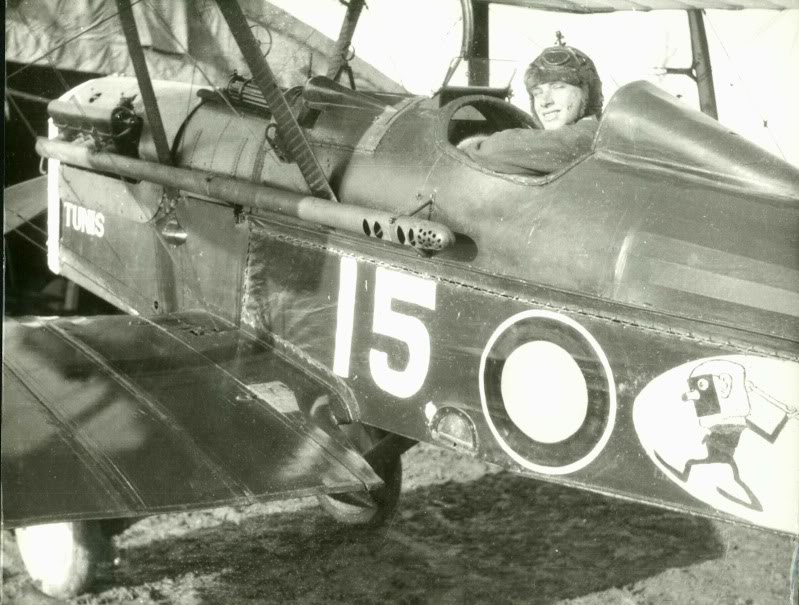
25th AS SE5a aircraft #15 flown by Lt Aubrey "Joe" Diamond.

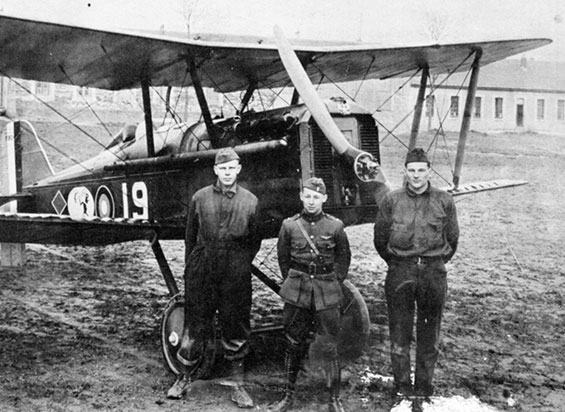
Lt Joseph Elwood, "Child Yank" Boudwin and crew (Sgt. F.C. Melby (left). and Pvt. C.L. Gilbert (right)) in front of Boudwin's Austin Motor Car Company-produced S.E. 5a #19 (s/n F8010).

25th AS SE5a aircraft #21

25th AS SE5a aircraft #23

=== Demobilization ===
After the signing of the Armistice and the conclusion of the war, flying continued on a limited basis to keep the pilots proficient in their skills. However, the main endeavors of the squadron were infantry drill guard duty, and Army administrative paperwork. Although the squadron did not destroy any enemy aircraft, it was granted the privilege of placing the squadron emblem on its aircraft as the pilots that made up the squadron had shot down over thirty enemy aircraft with their service in with the British.

Owing that the squadron had come late to the front, it remained at Toul until 15 April 1919 when, with the demobilization of the Second Army Air Service, orders were received from Second Army for the squadron to report to the 1st Air Depot, Colombey-les-Belles Aerodrome to turn in all of its supplies and equipment and was relieved from duty with the AEF. The squadron's S.E.5 aircraft were delivered to the Air Service American Air Service Acceptance Park No. 1 at Orly Aerodrome to be returned to the British. There practically all of the pilots and observers were detached from the squadron.

Personnel at Colombey were subsequently assigned to the commanding general, services of supply, and ordered to report to one of several staging camps in France. There, personnel awaited scheduling to report to one of the base ports in France for transport to the United States and subsequent demobilization.

In June, the 25th Aero Squadron returned to Mitchell Field, New York, where its men were demobilized and returned to civilian life.

=== Lineage ===
- Organized as 20th Aero Squadron on 13 June 1917

Re-designated 25th Aero Squadron on 21 June 1917
Re-designated 25th Aero Squadron (Pursuit) on 10 September 1918
Demobilized on 17 June 1919

=== Assignments ===
- Post Headquarters, Kelly Field, 13 June 1917
- Aviation Concentration Center, 3 January 1918
- Air Service Headquarters, AEF, British Isles

Attached to the Royal Flying Corps for training, 31 January-16 August 1918

- Replacement Concentration Center, AEF, 18 August 1918
- Air Service Production Center No. 2, 29 August 1918
- 1st Air Depot, 16 September 1918
- 4th Pursuit Group, 24 October 1918
- 1st Air Depot, 15 April 1919
- Commanding General, Services of Supply, April 1919
- Post Headquarters, Mitchell Field, June 1919

=== Stations ===
- Kelly Field, Texas, 13 Jun-28 Dec 1917
- Aviation Concentration Center, Garden City, New York, 3 January 1918
- Port of Entry, Hoboken, New Jersey, 9 January 1918

Overseas transport: RMS Carmania, 9–24 January 1918

- Liverpool, England, 24 January 1918
- Romsey Rest Camp, Winchester, England, 25 January 1918
- RFC Ayr, Scotland, 31 January 1918
- RFC Marske-by-the-Sea, England, 23 April 1918
- Romsey Rest Camp, Winchester, England, 7 August 1918
- Rest Camp #4, Le Havre, France, 16 August 1918
- St. Maixent Replacement Barracks, France, 18 August 1918
- Romorantin Aerodrome, France, 29 August 1918
- Colombey-les-Belles Aerodrome, France, 16 September 1918
- Croix de Metz Aerodrome, Toul, France, 24 October 1918
- Colombey-les-Belles Aerodrome, France, 19 April 1919
- France, April–June 1919
- Mitchell Field, New York, 6–17 June 1919.

=== Combat sectors and campaigns ===
Streamer	Sector/Campaign	Dates	Notes
	Meuse-Argonne Offensive Campaign	24 October-11 November 1918	

=== Notable personnel ===
- Reed G. Landis, formerly flew with No. 40 Squadron RAF accredited with 12 aerial victories
- Frederick Ernest Luff, accredited with 5 aerial victories, DFC recipient
- Donald S. Poler, accredited with 1 aerial victory, SSC recipient
- Eugene Hoy Barksdale, accredited with 6 aerial victories, DSC recipient, Barksdale AFB named in his honor
- Hilbert Leigh Bair, accredited with 6 aerial victories, DSC & DRC recipient
- Joseph Elwood "Shorty/Child Yank" Boudwin, Jr., also a No. 84 Squadron RAF veteran. The Warren J. Brown-authored history book "Child Yank over the Rainbow" is based on his diary.

== See also ==
- Organization of the Air Service of the American Expeditionary Force
- List of American aero squadrons
