= Frederick Ernest Luff =

American flying ace

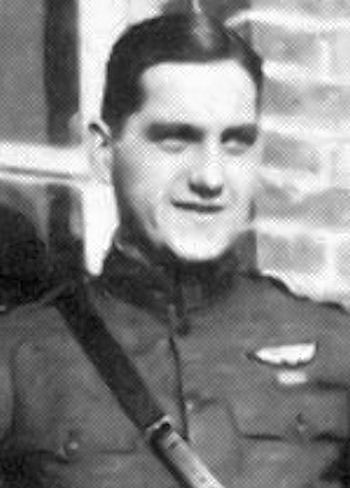
- Frederick Ernest Luff, 1918
- Born: 9 July 1896; Cleveland, Ohio, USA
- Died: 27 or 28 April 1931; Cleveland, Ohio
- Military career
- Allegiance: United States
- Branch: Royal Air Force (United Kingdom); Air Service, United States Army
- Rank: Lieutenant
- Units: Royal Air Force: No. 74 Squadron RAF; Air Service, United States Army: 25th Aero Squadron
- Conflicts: World War I
- Awards: Distinguished Flying Cross

Lieutenant Frederick Ernest Luff was an American flying ace during World War I. He was credited with five aerial victories, and awarded the British Distinguished Flying Cross.

Although he survived the war, he was injured in an air accident in May 1919 at Lorain, Ohio. He subsequently lived an invalid's life before expiring at home in Cleveland, Ohio in late April 1931.

== Early life ==
Frederick Ernest Luff was born in Cleveland, Ohio on 9 July 1896.

== World War I ==
Luff joined the United States Army Air Service during World War I and was trained as a pilot. He was then forwarded to the Royal Air Force for service. They posted him to pilot's duty with No. 74 Squadron RAF to fly a Royal Aircraft Factory SE.5a. He destroyed three German Fokker D.VII fighters and two observation balloons between 19 August and 15 September 1918, earning a Distinguished Flying Cross for his deeds. On 19 September, he rejoined the USAAS and was assigned to the 25th Aero Squadron. He and the 25th moved into combat on 9 November 1918, but the war ended two days later. The present-day U.S. Air Force unit, the 25th Space Range Squadron, traces its lineage back to the 25th Aero Squadron and recognizes Luff as a founding member.

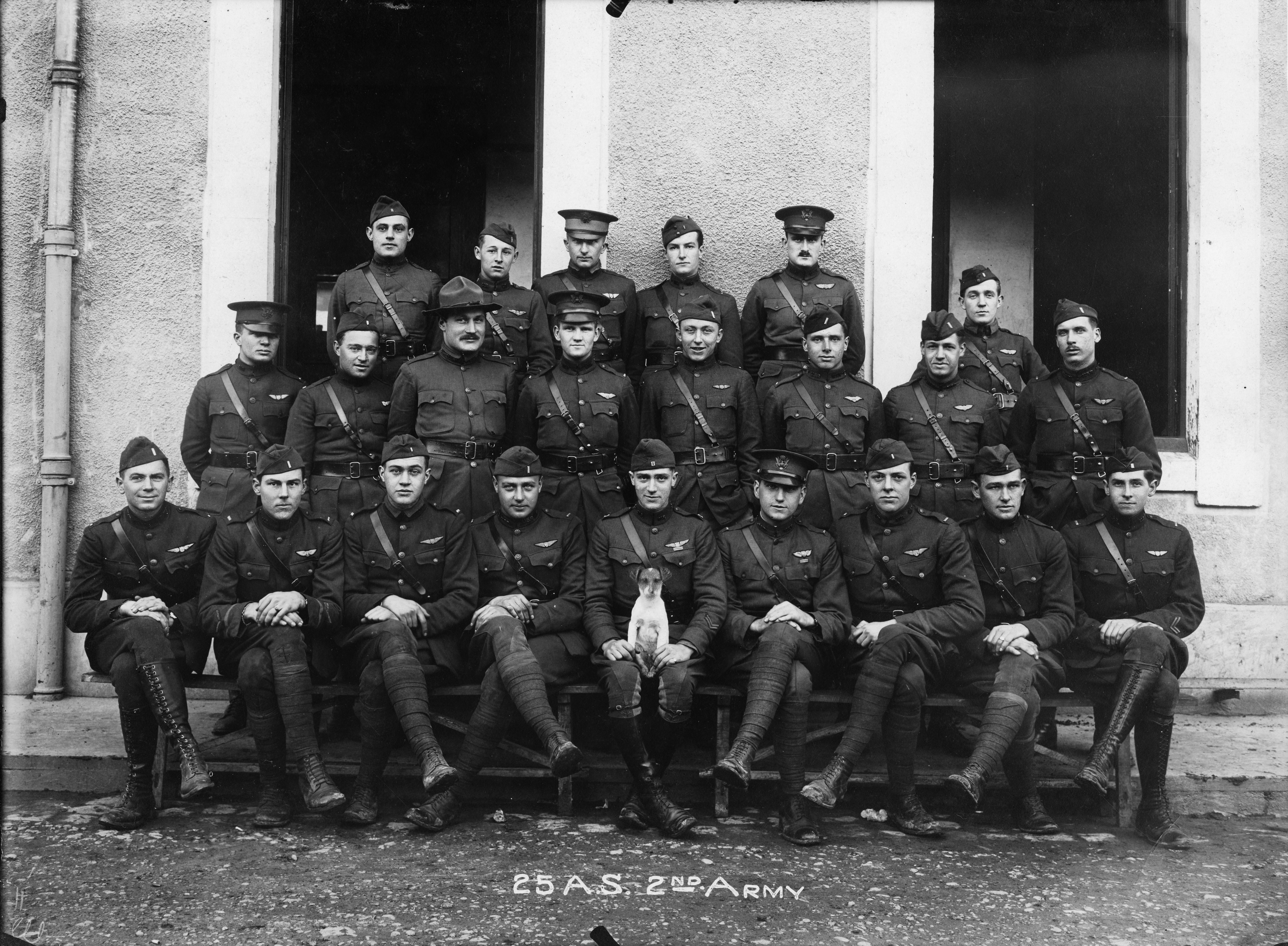
25th AS Officer Corps, Lt Luff pictured right of mascot

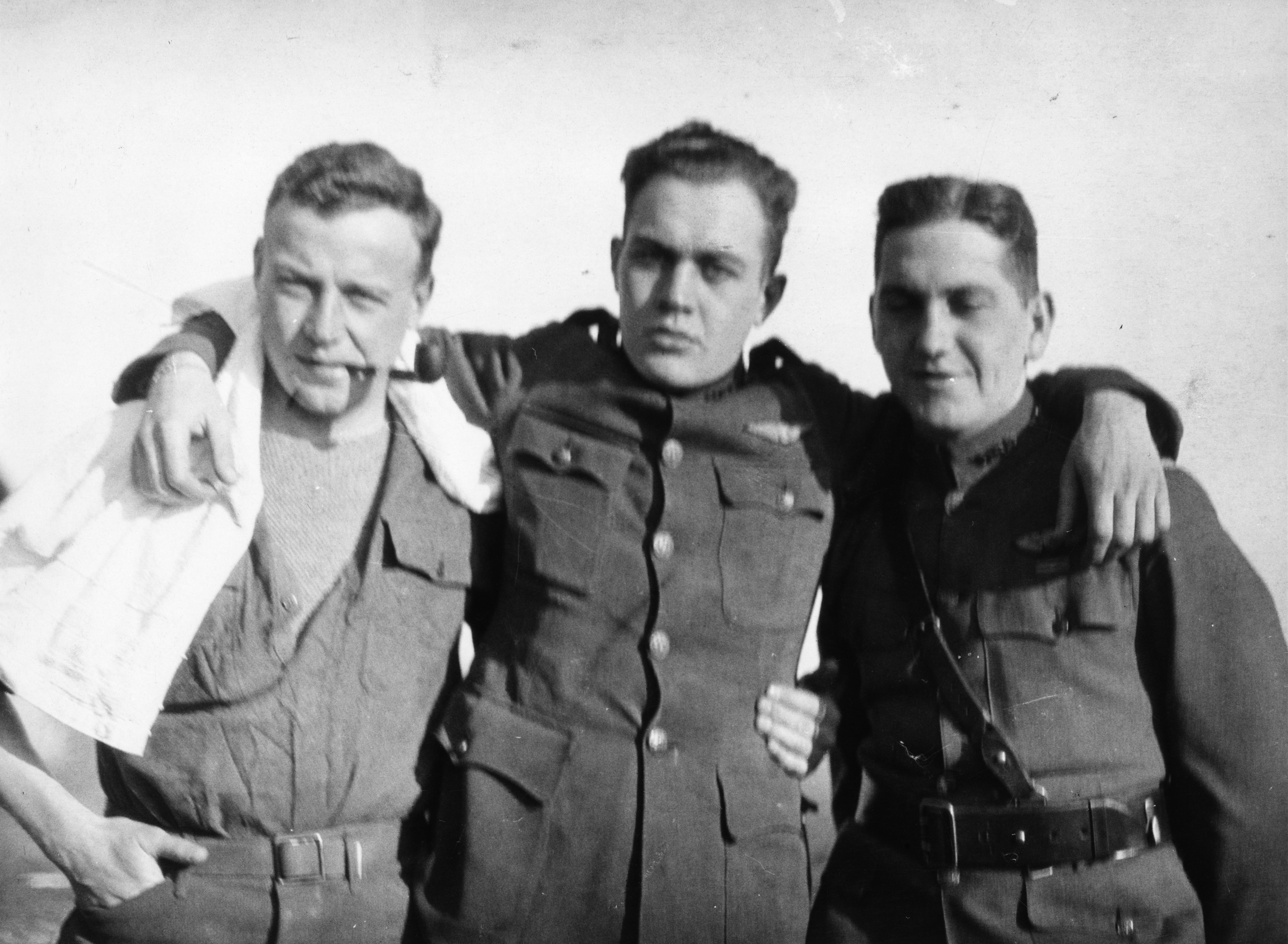
Posing with 25th AS mates, Lt Luff pictured on far right

== Post-war ==
Luff returned to the United States after the war, and survived an airplane crash at Lorain, Ohio in May 1919. However, injuries suffered in the accident left him an invalid until he died in his parents' home on 27 or 28 April 1931.

== See also ==
- List of World War I flying aces from the United States
- 25th Aero Squadron
- Eugene Hoy Barksdale
- Reed G. Landis

== Bibliography ==
- Above the Trenches: A Complete Record of the Fighter Aces and Units of the British Empire Air Forces 1915–1920. Christopher F. Shores, Norman Franks, Russell Guest. Grub Street, 1990. ISBN 0-948817-19-4, ISBN 978-0-948817-19-9.
- Over the Front: A Complete Record of the Fighter Aces and Units of the United States and French Air Services, 1914–1918 Norman Franks, Frank W. Bailey. Grub Street, 1992. ISBN 0-948817-54-2, ISBN 978-0-948817-54-0.
