= Reed G. Landis =

American World War I flying ace

Reed Gresham Landis
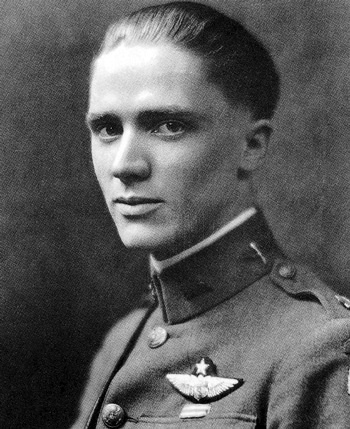
- Reed Gresham Landis, 1918
- Born: July 17, 1896; Ottawa, Illinois, USA
- Died: May 30, 1975 (aged 78) near Hot Springs, Arkansas, USA
- Relatives: Kenesaw Mountain Landis, father
- Military career
- Allegiance: United States
- Branch: Royal Air Force (United Kingdom); Air Service, United States Army
- Rank: Colonel
- Units: Royal Air Force: No. 40 Squadron RAF; Air Service, United States Army: 25th Aero Squadron
- Commands: 25th Aero Squadron
- Conflicts: World War I World War II
- Awards: Distinguished Service Cross, British Distinguished Flying Cross

Colonel Reed Gresham Landis (July 17, 1896 – May 30, 1975) was an American military aviator who served in the air services of the United States Army during World War I and World War II, and was credited as a flying ace during the former, with twelve aerial victories.

== Early life and World War I ==
Landis was born on July 17, 1896, in Ottawa, Illinois, United States. He was the only son of Winifred Reed Landis and federal judge Kenesaw Mountain Landis, the first Commissioner of Baseball. In 1916, Landis enlisted in the 1st Illinois Cavalry of the National Guard and served as a private along the Mexican border in Brownsville, Texas. In 1917 he joined the Aviation Section, U. S. Signal Corps. He finished his training in England and was posted to No. 40 Squadron RAF. Flying the Royal Aircraft Factory SE.5a he drove down a Pfalz D.III out of control on 8 May 1918 for his first victory. On 19 May, he destroyed another D.III. Between 14 July and 19 August, he claimed another ten victories.

His final tally was an observation balloon and eight enemy airplanes destroyed, and three enemy planes driven 'down out of control'. During the war he flew missions with George McElroy and Stan Dallas.

In late August 1918, Landis was transferred to command the 25th Aero Squadron, which never succeeded in getting into combat, only receiving its Austin-built S.E.5as in early November 1918. The present-day U.S. Air Force unit, the 25th Space Range Squadron, traces its lineage back to the 25th Aero Squadron and recognizes Landis as its first operational squadron commander.

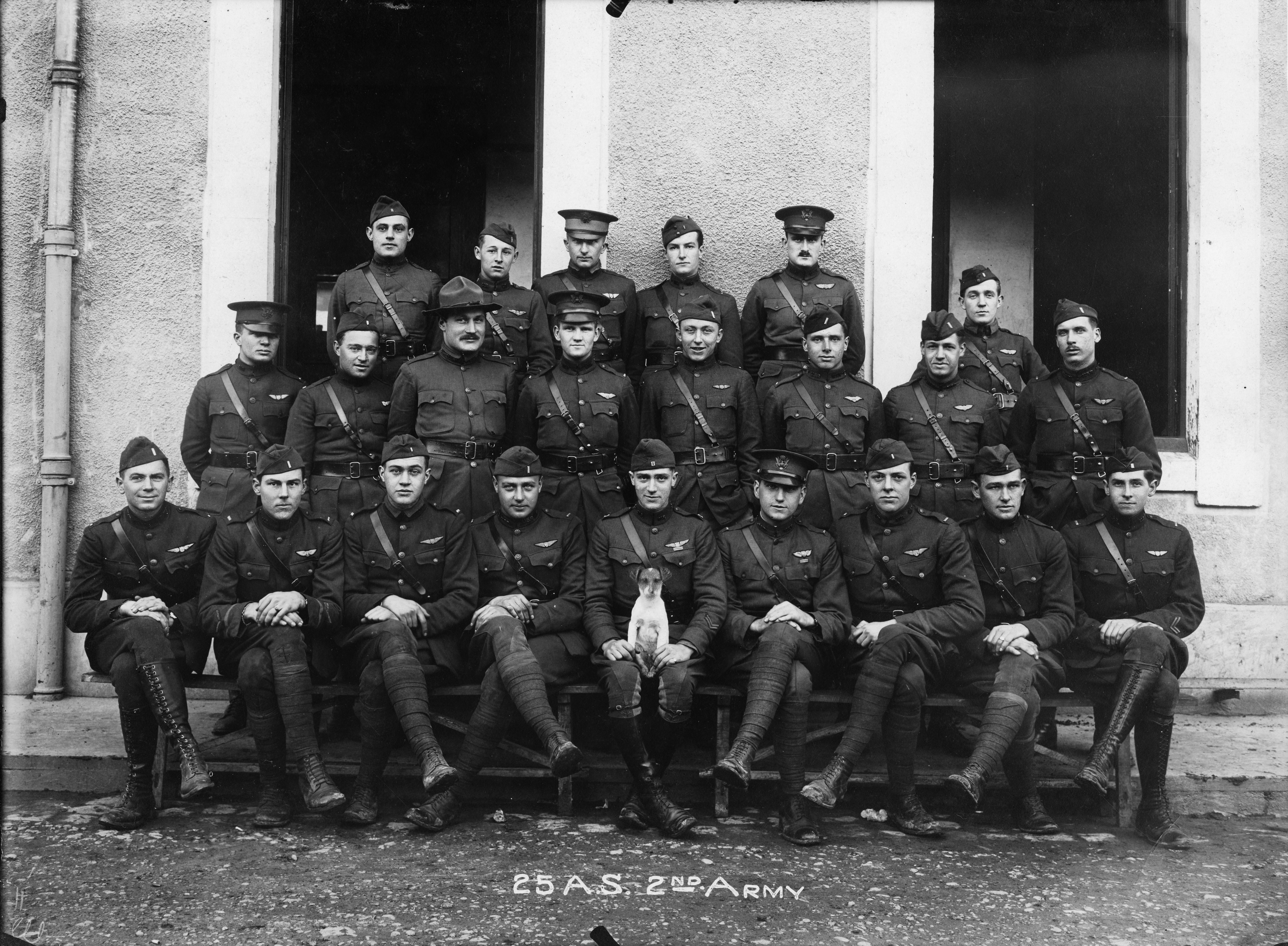
25th AS Officer Corps, Landis centered with "Mike" their mascot

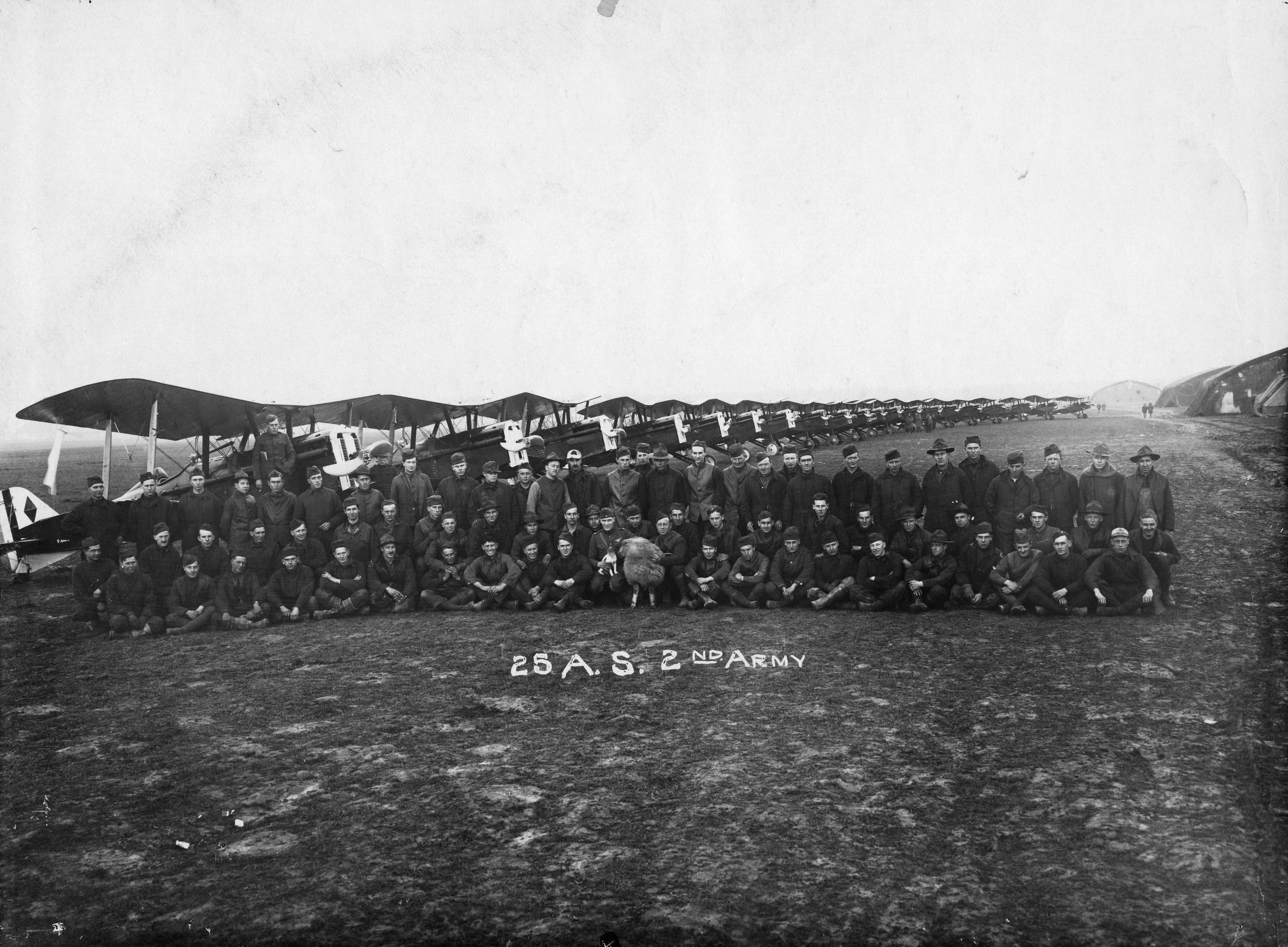
25th AS & Royal Aircraft Factory S.E.5 aircraft. Landis center w/mascot (dog)

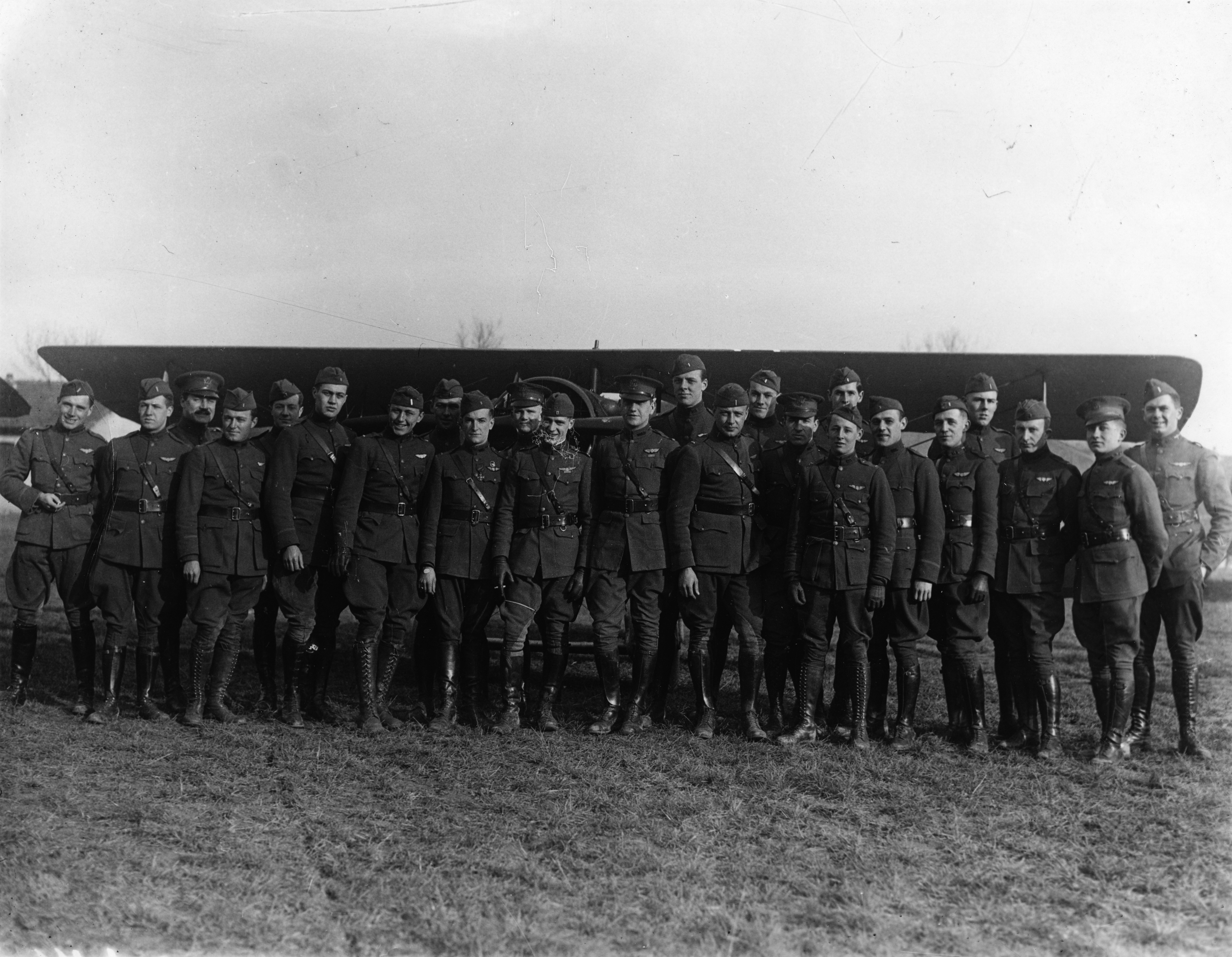
25th AS Pilots (Landis and first flight commanders identified. Nov 1918

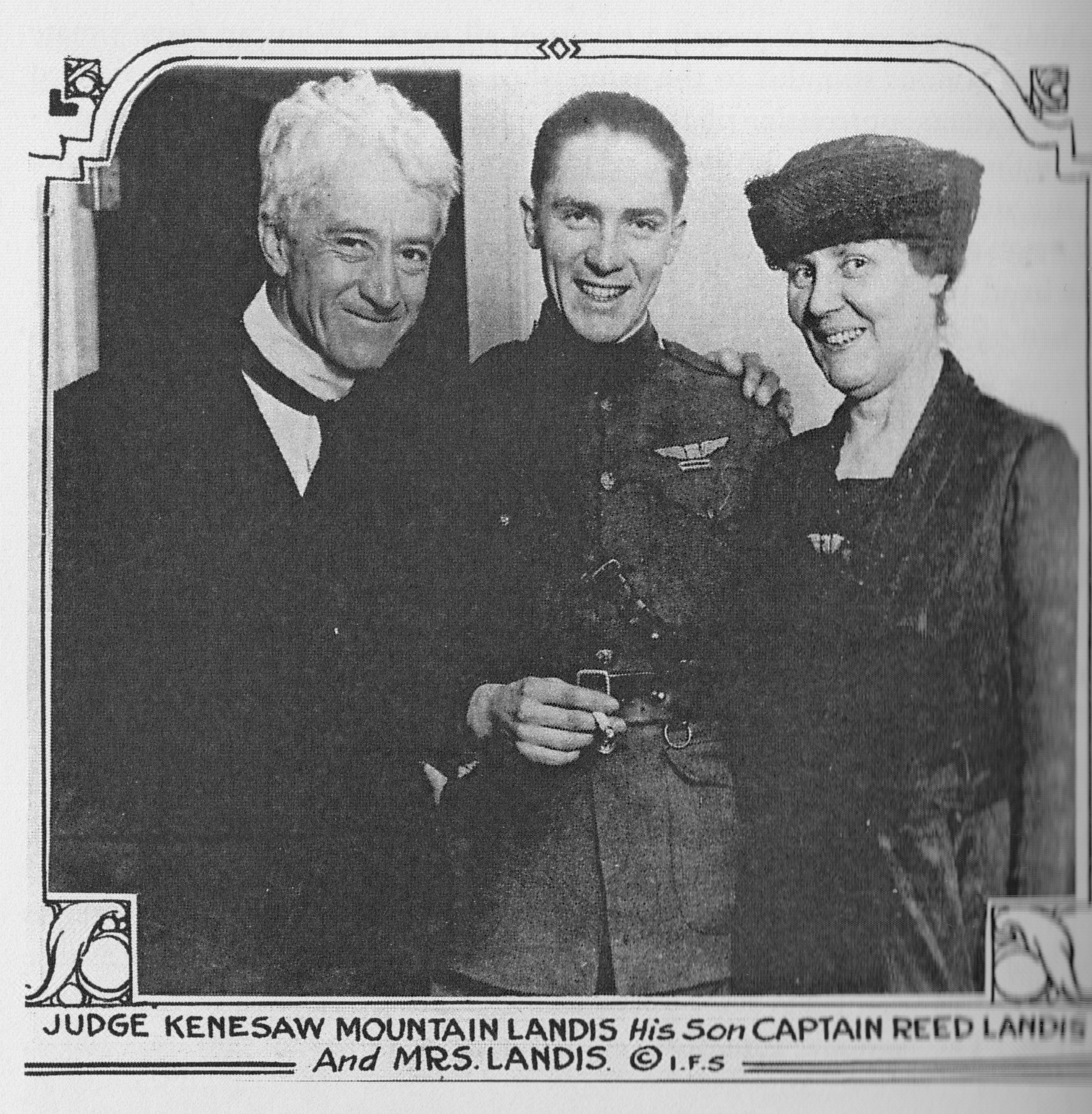
Landis and his parents

== Post World War I ==
During the 1920s, Landis became chairman of the American Legion. During World War II, he returned to service as a USAAC colonel stationed in Washington DC.

== Retirement ==
In April 1946, Landis announced his retirement and said that he would be living near Austin, Texas, by July. He had a residence near Bastrop State Park.

== Honors and awards ==
Distinguished Service Cross (DSC)

The Distinguished Service Cross is presented to Reed Gresham Landis, Captain (Air Service), U.S. Army, for extraordinary heroism in action west of Douai and south of Vitry, August 8, 1918; west of Brieve, August 12, 1918; and over Lens, August 13, 1918. During a general engagement west of Douai and south of Vitry on August 8, 1918, Captain Landis attacked and destroyed two enemy planes and one balloon in the course of a single flight. During a general engagement west of Brieve on August 12, 1918, he singled out an enemy plane and shot it down. While on patrol over Lens on August 13, 1918, he engaged four enemy triplanes and one biplane in decisive combat, and, despite the numerical superiority of the enemy, he destroyed two of their planes and forced the others to withdraw. On August 19, 1918, while leading a patrol of five planes he encountered and unhesitatingly attacked eight enemy Fokker scouts, one of which he shot down. During the combat several other enemy planes joined the action from above and observing one of these attacking a member of his patrol, he climbed up under it, and firing at point-blank range shot it down. General Orders No. 8, W.D., 1934

Distinguished Flying Cross (DFC)

For conspicuous gallantry and devotion to duty. He has carried out offensive patrols with marked determination and dash, and he has on all occasions engaged the enemy with marked skill and an entire disregard of personal danger. On 8 August 1918, he attacked an enemy kite balloon over Vitry-en-Artois. One observer jumped clear with a parachute and the balloon burst into flames and went down. Personally he has accounted for enemy aircraft as follows: On 8 August, during a general engagement west of Douai, he engaged a Fokker biplane and fired a short burst from point blank range. EA went down vertically after emitting a huge cloud of smoke and though the enemy machine was not seen to burst into flames, it was evidently on fire. He then attacked a balloon over Vitry but seeing a DFW below it, he attacked the EA instead. He fired a long burst from above; the enemy machine dived, started to spin and crashed on the southern edge of Vitry-en-Artois village. On 7 August, while on offensive patrol in the vicinity of Carvin, four enemy scouts were engaged. He selected one and fired about 300 rounds closing at short range. EA spiraled steeply, side-slipped at intervals and was seen to crash in the vicinity of Carvin. On 14 July, when on offensive patrol, he fired about 150 rounds into a Pfalz scout from 75 yards range. Enemy machine was observed to crash near Epinoy. In addition to the above, this officer has destroyed one EA and driven on down out of control.

Major Reed G. Landis trading card 1934 (front)

Major Reed G. Landis trading card 1934 (back)

== See also ==
- List of World War I flying aces from the United States
- 25th Aero Squadron
- 25th Space Range Squadron
- Frederick Ernest Luff
- Eugene Hoy Barksdale

== Bibliography ==
- American Aces of World War 1 Harry Dempsey. Osprey Publishing, 2001. ISBN 1-84176-375-6, ISBN 978-1-84176-375-0.
