= Eugene Hoy Barksdale =

United States Army Air Service pilot (1896–1926)

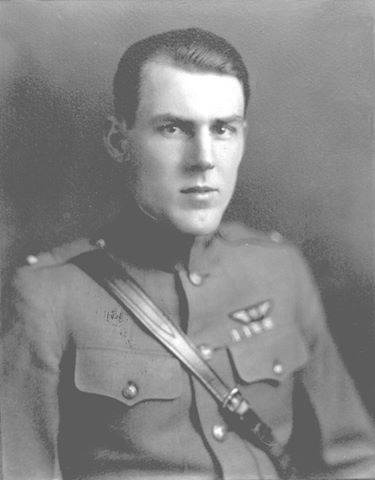
- Born: November 5, 1896; Goshen Springs, Mississippi, US
- Died: August 11, 1926 (aged 29); Dayton, Ohio, US
- Burial place: Arlington National Cemetery
- Military career
- Allegiance: United States
- Branch: U.S. Army Air Service
- Service years: 1918–1926
- Rank: First lieutenant
- Nickname: Hoy
- Units: 41st Squadron, Royal Flying Corps; 25th Aero Squadron
- Wars: World War I: Western Front

Lieutenant Eugene Hoy Barksdale (November 5, 1896 – August 11, 1926) was a noted aviator and was a First Lieutenant in the United States Army Air Service and Army Air Corps. The new Barksdale Field (now Barksdale Air Force Base) in Shreveport–Bossier City, Louisiana, was named for him on February 2, 1933.

== Early years ==
Born in Goshen Springs, Mississippi, Barksdale had one brother and five sisters. He attended Mississippi State College in Starkville for three years before leaving to enter officers training camp at Fort Logan H. Roots in Little Rock, Arkansas. He volunteered for the aviation section of the U.S. Army Signal Corps as a Private First Class.

== Life and career ==
Barksdale completed aviation ground school in Austin, Texas. In September 1917, he embarked to England and received flight training with the Royal Flying Corps and was posted to No. 41 Squadron RAF, on 31 July 1918. He later became a founding member of the U.S. Army's 25th Aero Squadron. In 1919, Barksdale was assigned to Mitchel Field, New York, where he married Lura Lee Dunn in 1921. On 8 March 1924 then Lt Barksdale and his navigator, Lt Bradley Jones, flew a DH-4B, powered by a 400-horsepower Liberty engine from McCook Field, OH to Mitchel Field using instruments only.

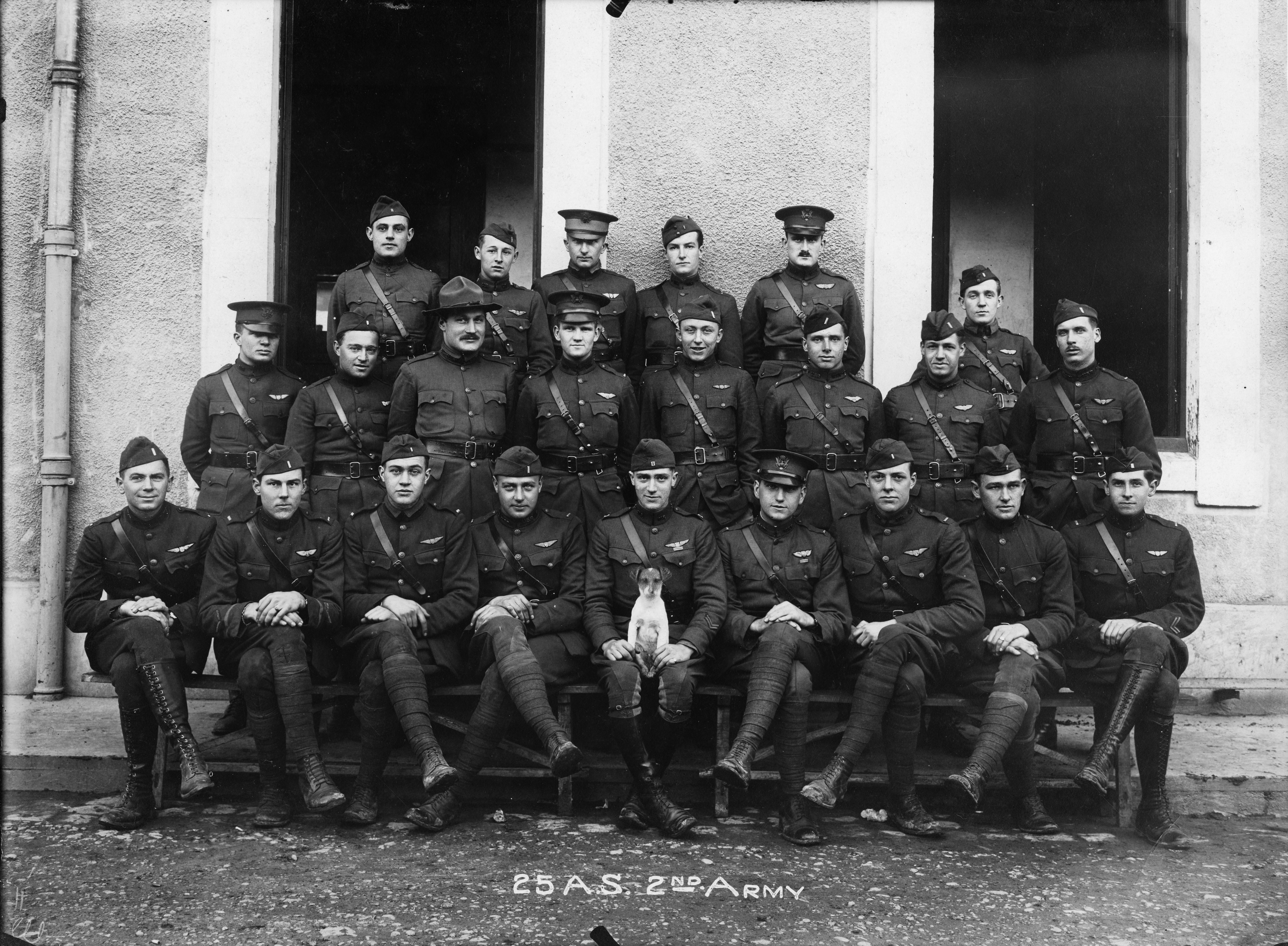
25th AS, Lt Barksdale pictured (bottom row, 2nd from left)

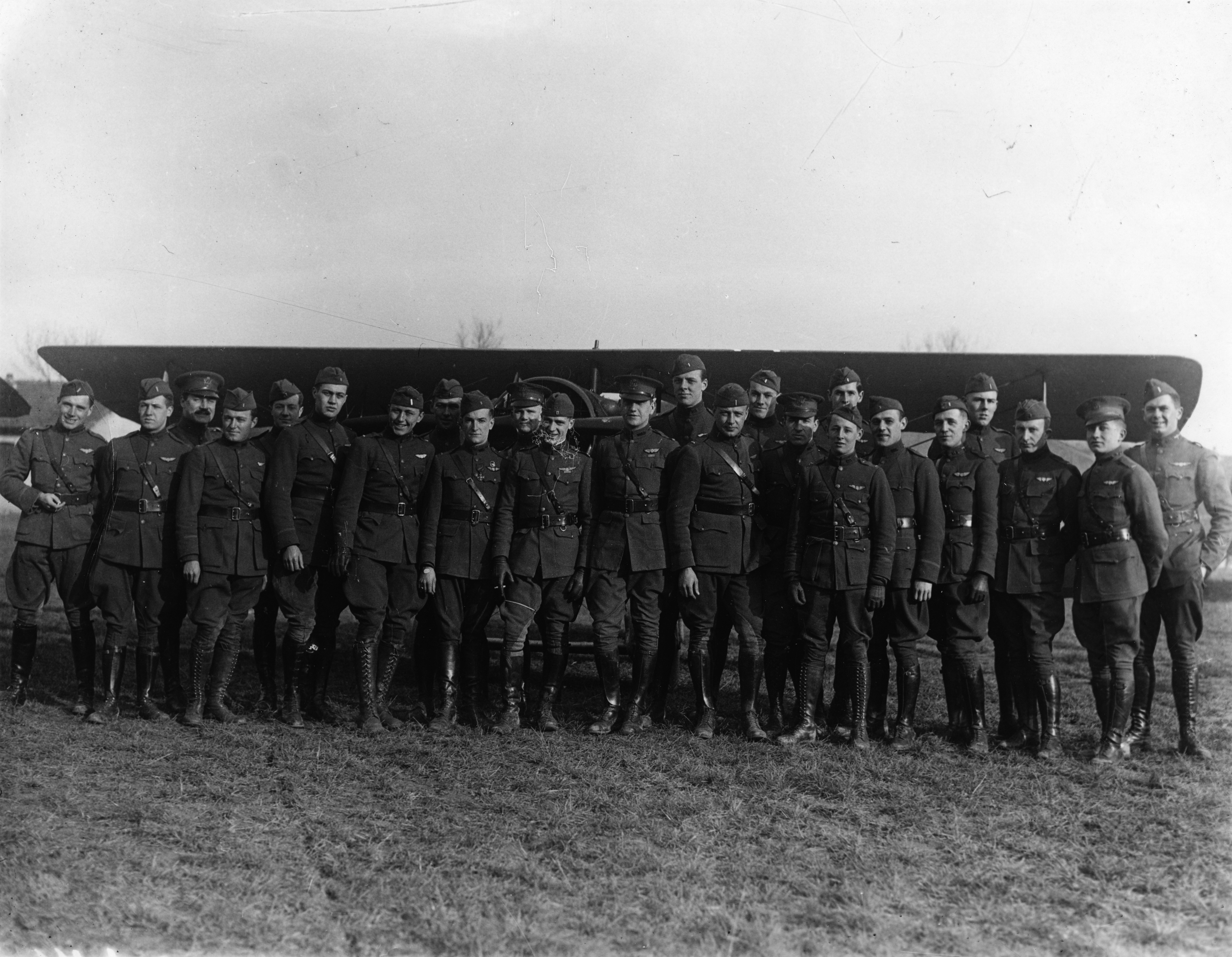
25th AS, Lt Barksdale pictured (forth from right, back row)

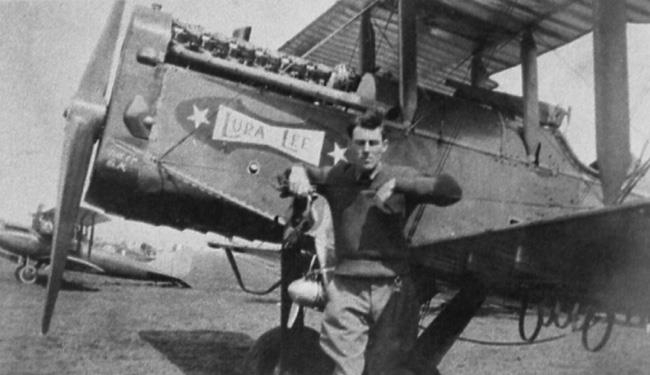
Lt Barksdale, date unknown

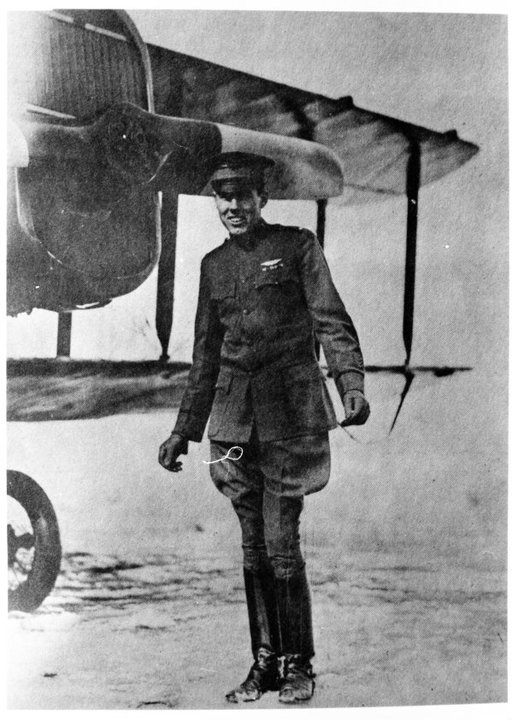
Lt Barksdale, date unknown

== Death ==
In August 1926, Barksdale was testing a Douglas O-2 observation airplane for spin characteristics over McCook Field in Dayton, Ohio, and was unable to recover from a flat spin. While attempting to bail out of the stricken plane, his parachute caught in the wing's bracing wires, and he went down with the plane and was killed. He was buried with full military honors in Arlington National Cemetery in Arlington, Virginia.

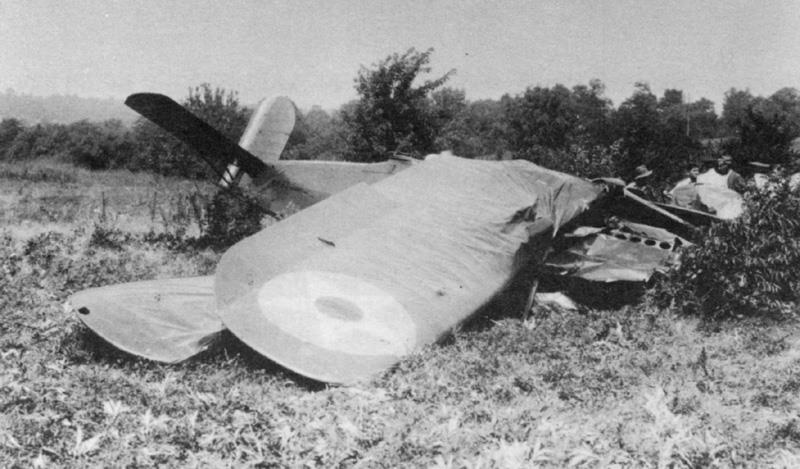
Douglas O-2 crash that killed Lt Barksdale.

== See also ==
- 25th Aero Squadron
- Reed G. Landis
- Frederick Ernest Luff
