= Bair, Bitola =

The neighborhood Bair is one of the largest quarters in Bitola. It extends from the street "Devejani" and Crn Most (in the west), "Ilindenska" (in the south) to the elementary school "Todor Angelevski" (in the east). The neighborhood includes over 30 streets, and there are two main schools: the elementary schools "Georgi Sugarev" and "Todor Angelevski". It is estimated that the population is 5,500 of which the majority are Macedonians and Roma (who mainly live on the streets "Kozjak" and "Karaorman"). Notable roads and buildings located here: the old road that connects Bitola with Ohrid, the legendary Krkardash with monasteries St. 40 Martyrs and St. Archangel Michael, one of the oldest trees in Bitola, Platanus orientalis and old hamams ("Turkish baths").
