= Steve Bair =

American politician from Idaho

Member of the Idaho Senate
- In office December 1, 2006 – November 30, 2022
- Preceded by: Stan Williams
- Succeeded by: Van Burtenshaw (redistricting)
- Constituency: 28th district (2006–2012); 31st district (2012–2022)

Personal details
- Born: April 9, 1958 (age 68) Blackfoot, Idaho
- Party: Republican
- Spouse: Peggy Jean Bartschi (m. 1980; died 1982) Lori Kae Belnap (m. 1983; died 2024)
- Children: 5
- Occupation: Retired farmer, agricultural sales

R. Steven 'Steve' Bair (born April 9, 1958) is a Republican member of the Idaho State Senate. He represents the 31st District since 2012. He previously served in District 28 from 2006 to 2012.

== Early life, education, and career ==
Bair was born native and resident of Blackfoot, Idaho. He graduated in 1976 from Snake River High School in Moreland, ID. Bair is a member of the Church of Jesus Christ of Latter-day Saints. Bair is married to Lori Kae Belnap and together they have five children. He attended Ricks College, earning a degree in Farm Crops Management. In addition to being a Senator, Bair was also a farmer. Bair was a Precinct Committeeman.

== Idaho Senate ==
=== Committees ===
Bair is currently serving on the following committees:

- Joint Finance and Appropriations - Chairman
- Resources & Environment

== Elections ==
District 28 Senate - Part of Bingham County
Year	Candidate	Votes	Pct	Candidate	Votes	Pct
2006 Primary	Steve Bair	2,658	62.6%	Paul Clark	1,588	37.4%
2006 General	Steve Bair	7,312	61.8%	Butch Hulse	4,512	38.2%
2008 Primary	Steve Bair (incumbent)	4,316	100%			
2008 General	Steve Bair (incumbent)	11,524	100%			
2010 Primary	Steve Bair (incumbent)	5,157	100%			
2010 General	Steve Bair (incumbent)	9,416	100%			

District 31 Senate - Bingham County
Year	Candidate	Votes	Pct	Candidate	Votes	Pct
2012 Primary	Steve Bair (incumbent)	5,610	100%			
2012 General	Steve Bair (incumbent)	11,048	64.4%	Cherie Harding Clawson	6,104	35.6%
2014 Primary	Steve Bair (incumbent)	5,071	100%			
2014 General	Steve Bair (incumbent)	9,100	100%			
2016 Primary	Steve Bair (incumbent)	2,461	100%			
2016 General	Steve Bair (incumbent)	13,954	100%			
