= Walter Lovell =

American war pilot and serviceman

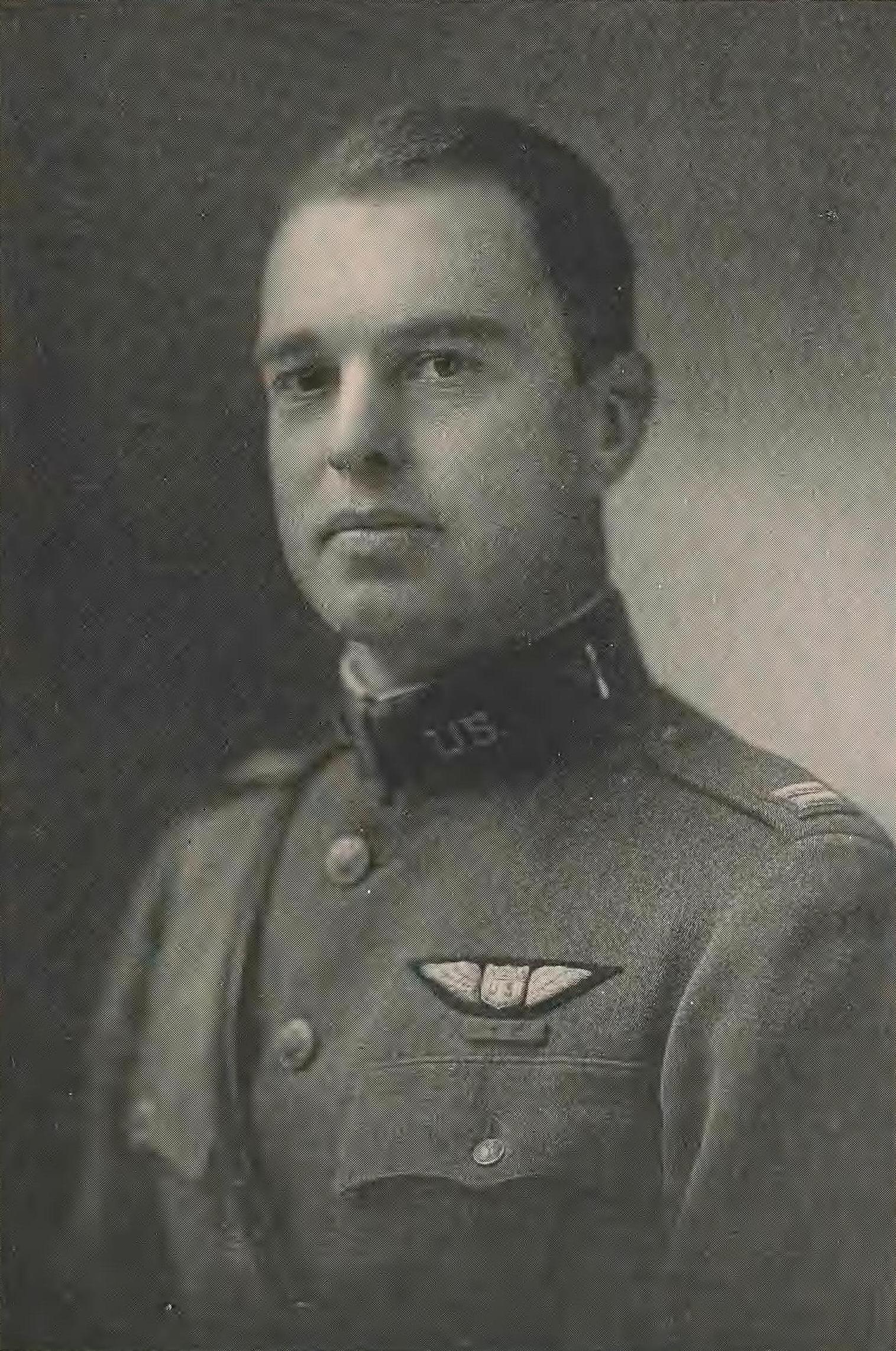
- Born: September 9, 1884; Newton, Massachusetts
- Died: September 10, 1937 (aged 53); Bay Shore, New York
- Spouse: Helene Du Bouchet
- Military career
- Allegiance: United States
- Branch: American Ambulance Hospital Field Service; Aéronautique Militaire (France); United States Army Air Service
- Service years: American Ambulance (1915–1916); French Air Service (22 May 1916 – 24 October 1917); United States Army Air Service (24 October 1917 – January 1919)
- Rank: Major
- Units: Aéronautique Militaire: Escadrille N.124 (Lafayette Escadrille) (26 February – 24 October 1917); American Expeditionary Forces (October 1917 – January 1918)
- Conflicts: World War I
- Awards: Croix de guerre with Star (Ambulance); Croix de guerre with Palm (Aviation); Médaille d'Argent

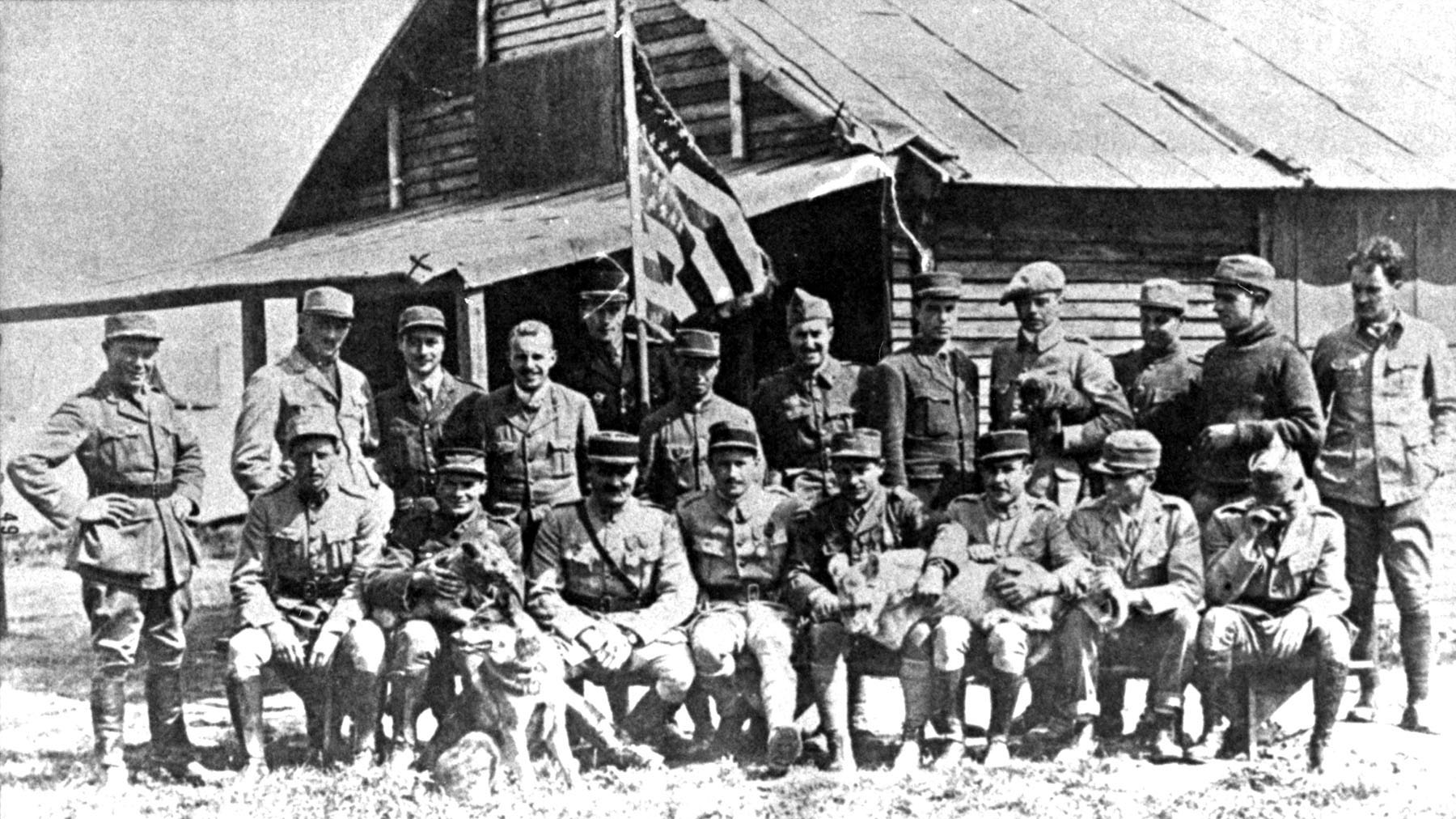
Pilots of SPA 124 Escadrille Lafayette at Chaudun, France, July 10, 1917.

Walter Lovell (September 9, 1884 – September 10, 1937) was a World War I volunteer pilot and an American serviceman. He was born in Newton, Massachusetts, to Wallace D. and Josephine (Hastings) Lowell. Walter attended Newton High School (now Newton North High School) and graduated from Harvard College with a Bachelor of Arts degree, class of 1907. He stayed in Boston and went into brokerage business after graduation.

== American Ambulance volunteer ==
In January 1915, Walter Lovell departed for England on RMS Lusitania, and in February 1915, joined the American Ambulance Hospital Field Service, known also as the American Field Service, in France. In the spring of 1915, the French High Command authorized creation of foreign sanitary sections of the American Ambulance and allowed them to be sent to the Western Front as part of the French Army Automobile Service. Lovell was dispatched to Alsace and after six months became second in command of the American Automobile Sanitary Section N° 2 of the Sanitary Service of the 73rd division displaying leadership qualities. His citation in May 1916 mentioned that he "has always given proof of a noteworthy spirit; has constantly set the example of courage to the other drivers, and has been an invaluable assistant to the commander of his Section". Ambulance service earned Lovell his first Croix de Guerre for bravery and courage. In the summer of 1916, Lowell along with Clyde Balsley, Willis Haviland, Thomas Hewitt, Henry Jones, James McConnell and Robert Rockwell applied for a transfer from American Field Service to French Air Service.

== French Air Service ==
From June 1916 till March 1917, he underwent training in different aviation schools in Buc, Avord and Pau, and finally was breveted on 1 October 1916 at Buc Aviation School. Lowell joined the Lafayette Escadrille on 26 February 1917, going on to become one of the unit's most dependable fliers and patrol leaders.

During his ten-month stay at the Western Front of the World War I as a fighter-pilot, Sergeant Walter Lovell flew near daily Nieuport 17 and Spad VII aircraft on different missions, mostly behind the enemy line, eventually becoming Lafayette Escadrille's adjutant. He scored only one confirmed victory – over Dun-sur-Meuse, in a close fight with an Albatros D.V – many, according to James Norman Hall and other fellow-pilots, remained unaccountable. Lovell left the Lafayette Escadrille on October 24, 1917, for General Headquarters of the American Expeditionary Force at Chaumont after his medical test indicated a hearing loss and color blindness, which kept him behind a desk for the balance of the war. In the Lafayette Escadrille, Lowell was not alone in his physical deficiency since the medical board discovered to its surprise that Raoul Lufbery did not have a proper sense of balance, William Thaw, Charles Dolan and Dudley Hill had poor vision in one eye, and Henry Jones had flat feet, which did not stop them from becoming celebrated World War I fliers.

== United States Army Air Service ==
After being accepted to the United States Army Air Service, Lovell was promoted to captain on January 1, 1918, and to major in August 1918, and went on to serve as a member of the French Aviation Mission in Paris and chief aviation instructor in the United States from July 1918 till the Armistice.

== Later life ==
Lovell resigned his commissions in January 1919 at Washington, D.C., and took residence in Paris, where he had married Helėne Du Bouchet on April 16, 1918, in the American Church on Rue de Berri.

September 10, 1937, Lovell died after a three-month illness connected to brain abscess.
