= James Rogers McConnell =

American World War I aviator (1887–1917)

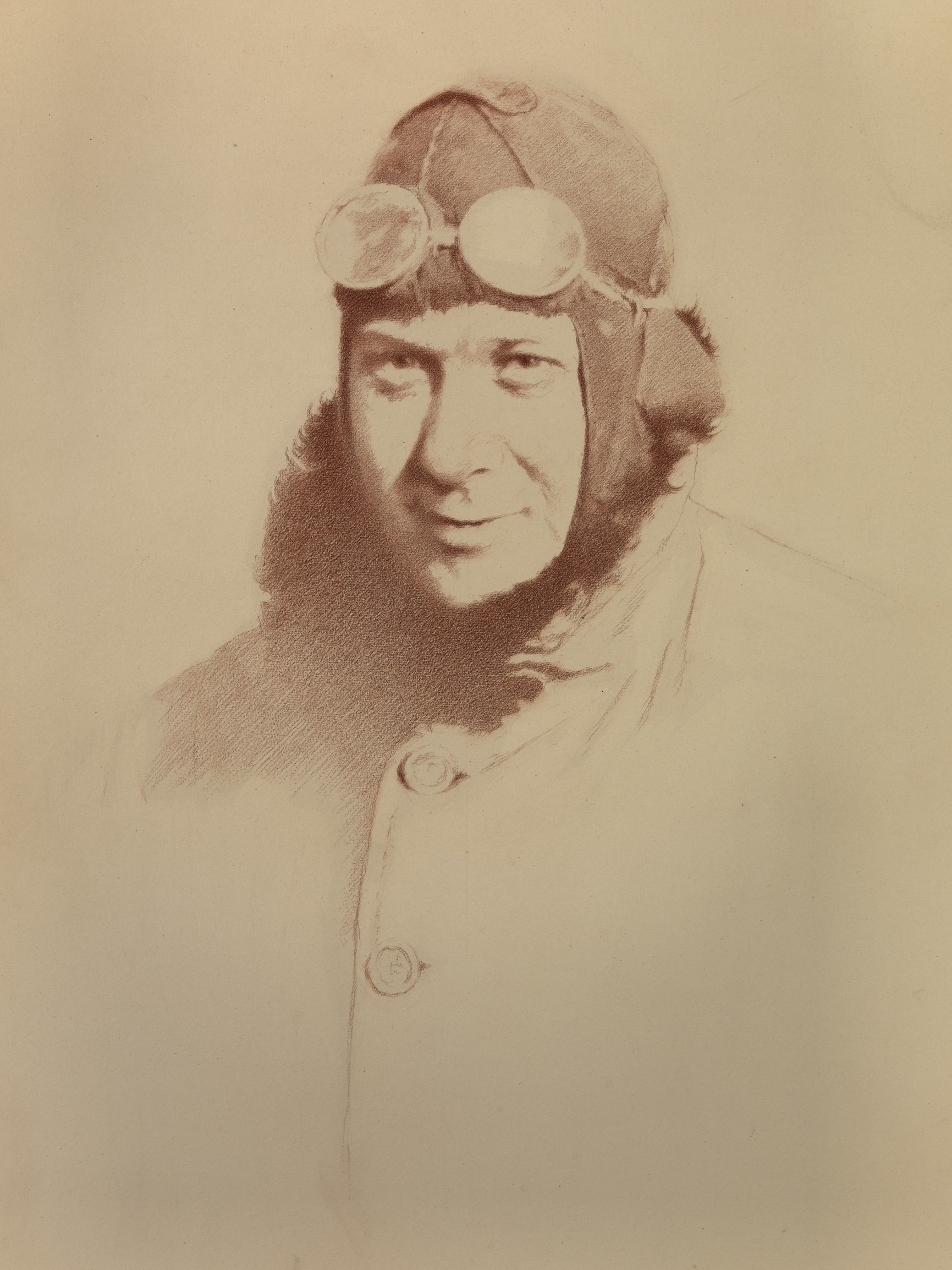
- Born: March 14, 1887; Chicago, Illinois
- Died: March 19, 1917 (aged 30) near Saint-Quentin, France
- Military career
- Allegiance: France
- Unit: Lafayette Escadrille
- Conflicts: World War I †: Battle of the Somme; Battle of Verdun

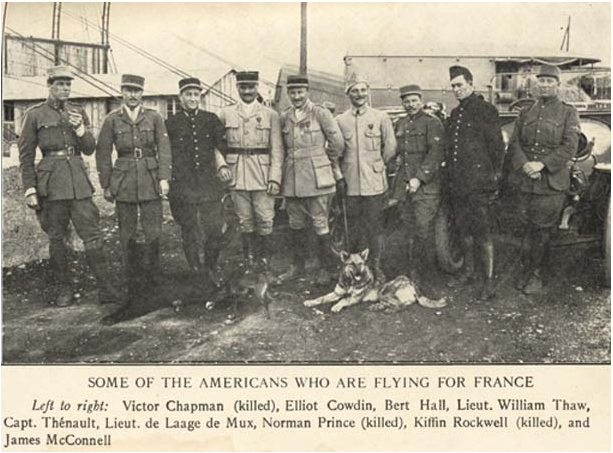
The Lafayette Escadrille

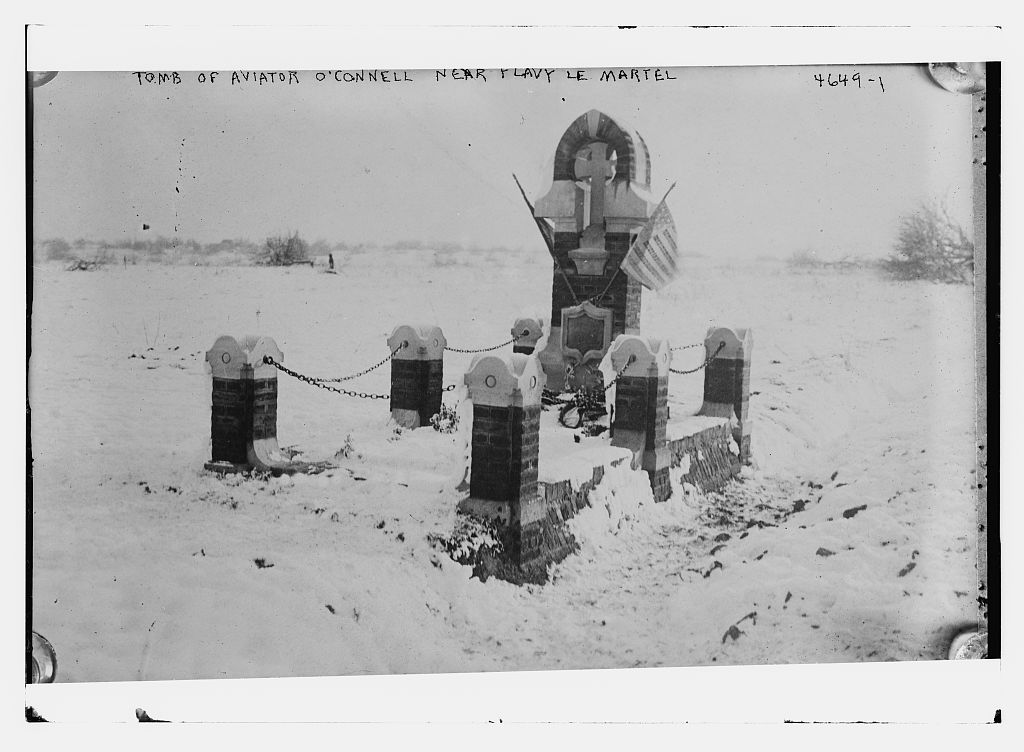
McConnell's tomb near Flavy Le Martel in 1918

James Rogers McConnell (14 March 1887 – 19 March 1917) flew as an aviator during World War I in the Lafayette Escadrille and authored Flying for France. He was the first of sixty-four University of Virginia students to die in battle during that war.

== Early life ==
Born in Chicago, he was the son of Judge Samuel Parsons McConnell and Sarah Rogers McConnell. The family moved from Chicago to New York City following the judge's resignation from the bench and then to Carthage, North Carolina. James attended private schools in Chicago, Morristown, N.J., and Haverford, Pa. In 1908 he enrolled at the University of Virginia, staying for two undergraduate years and one in the law school. While there he founded an "aero club," engaged in numerous collegiate pranks, was elected King of the Hot Feet (later painting a red foot on the side of his plane in France), was assistant cheerleader, and joined the Omicron chapter of Beta Theta Pi as well as the organization Theta Nu Epsilon. In 1910 McConnell left law school and joined his family in Carthage. There he served as the land and industrial agent of the Seaboard Air Line Railway and secretary of the Carthage Board of Trade. He also wrote promotional pamphlets for the Sandhills area of North Carolina. He never married.

== World War I ==
When war broke out in Europe, McConnell soon came to the conclusion, as he is quoted in the introduction to his book, Flying for France, that: "These sand hills will be here forever, but the war won't, so I'm going." In January 1915, McConnell sailed from New York to enlist with the American Ambulance Corps in France. In a letter to a friend in 1915, he wrote: "Tomorrow I am going to the front with our squad and twelve ambulances. . . . I am having a glorious experience." His rescue of a wounded French soldier while under fire was one of many similar acts. France awarded him the Croix de Guerre for "conspicuous bravery in saving wounded under fire.

Dissatisfied with his field of service and America's position towards the war, McConnell withdrew from the Ambulance Corps and entered the aviation training program. Of his decision to join the fighting ranks, he wrote: "All along I had been convinced that the United States ought to aid in the struggle against Germany. With that conviction, it was plainly up to me to do more than drive an ambulance. The more I saw the splendor of the fight the French were fighting, the more I felt like an embusque (French for Ambusher) - what the British call a "shirker." So I made up my mind to go into aviation." On May 13, 1916, McConnell participated in the unit's first patrol. Thirty-eight pilots of the Lafayette Escadrille flew Nieuport biplanes that traveled at 110 miles per hour (180 km/h) Operating from Luxeuil Field in eastern France, McConnell's group typically set off each day at dawn, clad in fur-lined outfits for two-hour patrols. Only after the Battle of Verdun were the planes equipped with machine guns; prior to this, pilots simply fired machine guns single-handedly while steering. The 47-round Lewis machine guns were replaced with 500-round Vickers models which synchronized with the rotating propellers. While convalescing from a back injury, suffered during a landing mishap, McConnell found time to compose Flying for France.

== Flying for France ==
After suffering a serious back injury from a landing mishap, McConnell took time to write about his experiences in the war. Flying for France goes in depth about his personal experiences with the Escadrille from his training period to his participation in the Battle of Verdun. McConnell expresses the strict rules and regulations that were put in place, but also notes the large amount of freedom gained after, "save when he is flying or on guard, his time is his own." When the war began, most people doubted the possibility of an American entering the French aviation service. Yet, by the fall of 1915, there were six Americans serving as full-fledged pilots, and in the summer of 1916, the number grew to a list of fifteen or more, with twice that number training for their pilot's license in the military aviation schools. As Americans soldiers, McConnell and his comrades were all treated with respect and shown more than the ordinary consideration by the French Government.

In his book, McConnell describes his experience at the front in a manner consisting of short narrations, personal letters, as well as explanations for tests for the military brevet, trick flying and stunts. McConnell explains the pilot life at the front in Luxeuil as a "delightful opportunity to see that glorious countryside." The American Escadrille was sent to Luxeuil primarily to achieve teamwork necessary for a strong, functional flying unit. In addition, the new pilots needed to familiarize themselves with anti-aircraft artillery over a battlefield.

McConnell goes on to describe the Escadrille's first sortie and recounts his fear of losing contact with his companions as he had never flown over the region. During the flight, the clouds had closely joined and blocked his view of the other planes, and he had lost the others altogether. McConnell continued to grow uncertain about his position as he couldn't make out a single plane, but one by one, the others began bobbing up above the cloud level. Upon the Escadrille's first sortie, they flew over Dannemarie where they were able to see the trenches for a brief time before they were shot at with shrapnel. The Escadrille escaped and turned north after crossing the lines into Mullhouse, where McConnell notes the keen sense of satisfaction of "their invasion of real German territory."

In mid September 1916, the Escadrille was ordered to pack up and head to Somme. During this transition, Victor Chapman, a close friend of McConnell's, died over the Verdun sector and his death visibly shook up the Escadrille. Quoted from his novel, McConnell describes the aftermath of the news: "We could read the pain in one another's eyes. If only it could have been some one else, was what we all thought, I suppose. To lose Victor was not an irreparable loss to us merely, but to France, and to the world as well." Chapman was the first to die, followed by Kiffin Rockwell, the first American pilot to shoot down a German aircraft in World War I, and Norman Prince, a leading founder of France's Lafayette Escadrille - all close friends with McConnell. The death of his comrades urged the rest of the men to greater action against the Boche.

The arrival at Somme shifted the escadrille's previous concept of pilot life. Before Somme, the escadrille had always been quartered in towns and the life of the pilots was all that could be desired in the way of comforts. They had come to believe that they would only wage a de luxe war, and were therefore unprepared for any other sort of campaign. The introduction to the Somme was a rude awakening. Instead of being quartered in a villa or hotel, the pilots were directed to a portable barracks newly erected in a sea of mud.

== Battle of Verdun ==
Shortly after the Escadrille's first sortie, they were ordered to the sector of Verdun. Fights occurred on almost every sortie; all the pilots whose planes were in commission, besides the ones who stayed behind on guard, would leave early and average from four to six on a sortie, unless too many flights had been ordered for that day, in which case only two or three went out at a time. The Germans seldom crossed into French territory, unless on a bombarding jaunt, and thus practically all the fighting took place on the German side of the line.

After the Battle of Verdun, McConnell was given a new plane on which the 500-round Vickers machine gun was synchronized with the propeller.

== Death and legacy ==
McConnell was flying in the area of St.-Quentin when two German planes shot him down on March 19, 1917. He was the last American pilot of the squadron to die under French colors before America entered the war in April 1917. Both the plane and his body were found by the French, and he was buried at the site of his death, in a meadow at the edge of the village of Jussy, and was later reinterred at the Lafayette Escadrille memorial near Paris upon his father's wishes. McConnell was commemorated with a plaque by the French Government and a statue by Gutzon Borglum at the University of Virginia, as well as an obelisk on the court square of his home town of Carthage, North Carolina. The monument bears an inscription reading in part, "He fought for Humanity, Liberty and Democracy, lighted the way for his countrymen and showed all men how to dare nobly and to die gloriously."

In his final letter, found among his effects, McConnell wrote:

"My burial is of no import. Make it as easy as possible on yourselves. I have no religion and do not care for any service. If the omission would embarrass you, I presume I could stand the performance.

"Good luck to the rest of you. God damn Germany and Vive la France."

The Gilliam–McConnell Airfield, built in Carthage, North Carolina in 1994, was named partly in homage to McConnell.

=== The Aviator ===
The Aviator

Alumni of Virginia and friends of McConnell commissioned a statue, The Aviator, by Gutzon Borglum, that now adorns the grounds of the University of Virginia. The statue's base reads: "Soaring like an eagle into new heavens of valor and devotion".

When Armistead Dobie accepted the statue on behalf of the university during Finals in 1919, he recalled of McConnell's nature a "hatred of the humdrum, an abhorrence of the commonplace, a passion for the picturesque."

The Seven Society, of which McConnell was a member, presented a wreath on that day.

Today, brothers of McConnell's fraternity, the Omicron of Beta Theta Pi, remember his exploits in song and memorialize the fallen aviator every year on March 19 with an all-day color guard and a memorial ceremony.
