= Stephen W. Thompson =

American military aviator (1894–1977)

- Stephen Thompson in the uniform he was wearing on February 5, 1918. Note the French Croix de guerre with Palm.
- Born: March 20, 1894; West Plains, Missouri, United States
- Died: October 9, 1977 (aged 83); Dayton, Ohio, United States
- Relatives: Wife: Dorothy Mary (Wright) Thompson (Born: August 25, 1896 – Died: October 1971) Children: Dr. Stephen Wright Thompson (Born: September 24, 1926), died June 17, 2018) Dr. Robert James Thompson (Born: September 21, 1930), Mary Catherine (Thompson) Muller (Born: August 17, 1931)
- Military career
- Allegiance: United States Army Air Service
- Branch: United States 1st Aero Squadron
- Service years: 1917–1918
- Awards: Croix de Guerre with Palm; Purple Heart

Stephen W. Thompson (March 20, 1894 – October 9, 1977) was an American aviator of World War I. Flying as a gunner on a French aircraft in February 1918, he became the first member of the United States military to shoot down an enemy aircraft. Kiffin Rockwell achieved an earlier aerial victory as an American volunteer member of the French Lafayette Escadrille in 1916.

== World War I ==
Thompson arrived in France in September and was assigned to the United States 1st Aero Squadron for training as an observer. The commander was Major Ralph Royce, who became a general in the Army Air Forces during World War II. The training took place from a field in Amanty. The French day bombardment squadron Br.123, which flew the Breguet 14 B2, was nearby at Neufchâteau aerodrome, and Royce was occasionally able to send one of his men along with the French on a raid.

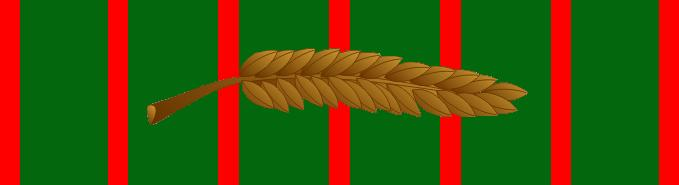
Croix de guerre 1914–1918 ribbon with palm

On February 5, 1918, the 1st Aero Squadron had not yet begun combat operations, and Thompson visited a French unit with a fellow member of the 1st Aero Squadron. Both were invited to fly as gunner-bombardiers with the French on a bombing raid over Saarbrücken, Germany. After they had dropped their bombs, the squadron was attacked by Albatros D.III fighters. Thompson shot down one of them. This was the first aerial victory by any member of the U.S. military. He was awarded the Croix de Guerre with Palm for the action.

In May, he was assigned to the new 12th Aero Squadron at Ourches-sur-Meuse airdrome, commanded by Capt. Lewis H. Brereton. On July 28, now flying from a farm field near La Ferté-sous-Jouarre, he was in another memorable battle. While doing artillery spotting during a battle near Château-Thierry, his Salmson 2 A2 was attacked by four Fokker D.VIIs from what had been Richthofen's Flying Circus but was by then under the command of Hermann Göring. Thompson shot down the first two planes that attacked him, but a bullet from the third hit his machine gun and disabled it. He was then hit in the leg, and his pilot was hit in the stomach by an exploding bullet. The pilot J. C. Miller managed to crash land the plane before he died of his wounds. Thompson dug the bullet out of his leg with a pocket knife. The uniform that Thompson was wearing when he shot down the Albatros D.III and the bullet he dug from his leg are on display at the National Museum of the United States Air Force.

== Post-war life ==
After the war Thompson worked for several years as an engineer at McCook Field, the predecessor of today's Wright-Patterson Air Force Base. He then became a high school mathematics teacher. During World War II he taught preflight and meteorology. He maintained an interest in aviation and in 1940 he received U.S. Patent No. 2,210,642 for a tailless flying wing. He died in Dayton, Ohio at age 83.

== See also ==
- Kiffin Rockwell, American who shot down the first plane as a member of the Lafayette Escadrille
- Frederick Libby, the first American flying ace
