= Paul Pavelka =

American aviator (1890–1917)

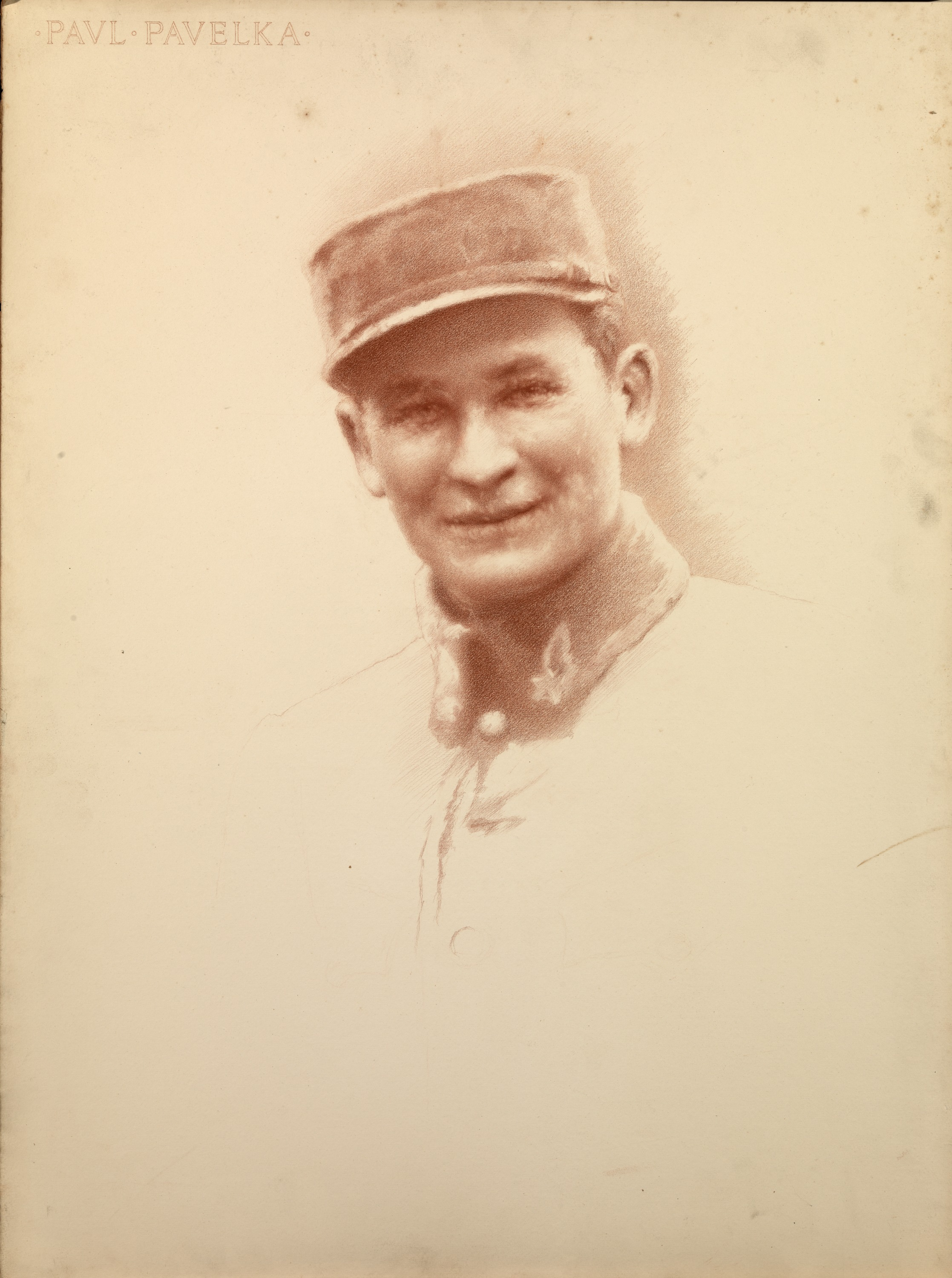
- Pavelka, ca. 1917–1925
- Born: Paul Pavelka; October 26, 1890; New York City, U.S.
- Died: November 12, 1917 (age 27); Monastir, North Macedonia
- Burial place: Lafayette Escadrille Memorial Cemetery, Paris, France
- Military career
- Allegiance: United States/France
- Branch: Aviation/Infantry
- Service years: 1914–1917
- Rank: Sergeant
- Nickname: "Skipper"
- Unit: Lafayette Escadrille
- Conflicts: Second Battle of Champagne

Paul Pavelka (October 26, 1890 – November 12, 1917) was an American aviator and a member of the Lafayette Escadrille. He joined the United States Navy as a sailor and served on the USS Maryland (ACR-8). In World War I, his regiment fought in the Second Battle of Champagne. Pavelka then transferred to French aviation, later joining the Lafayette Escadrille in August 1916. He received the Croix de Guerre while part of the French Air Force unit, and was a member of the Army of the Orient along the Macedonian front. On November 12, 1917, while serving along the Macedonian front, Pavelka was killed by being thrown from a horse and trampled.

== Early life ==
Pavelka was born to Hungarian immigrants Paul and Anna Pavelka in The Bronx, New York, on October 26, 1890. He attended a public school in the Bronx before moving to Madison, Connecticut. His mother died in 1907 after she fell on a pitchfork. His father remarried, but Pavelka and his new stepmother did not get along and he left home.

Pavelka began work on farms in Vermont and New Hampshire before working as a lumberjack in Canada. His next job was as a nurse at a mental health hospital in New York, after which he travelled across the country by train to work at a cattle and sheep ranch in Montana. While in Idaho, Pavelka was shot by a train guard who thought he was trying to hijack a train. He then moved to near a river in Washington in 1909, before moving south towards California, becoming a migrant laborer and an assistant nurse at a hospital in San Francisco. In 1910, Pavelka went to the Panama Canal Zone before moving south and climbing the Andes as part of an expedition that killed his fellow climbers. Pavelka became a sailor at the age of twenty, crossing the Pacific Ocean, stopping in London, and coming back to New York City before 1912. He was once involved in a shipwreck, and had to walk across South America to get to his next port. He then joined the United States Navy, serving on the USS Maryland (ACR-8), before being discharged. He moved to France in 1914 prior to the beginning of World War I.

== World War I ==
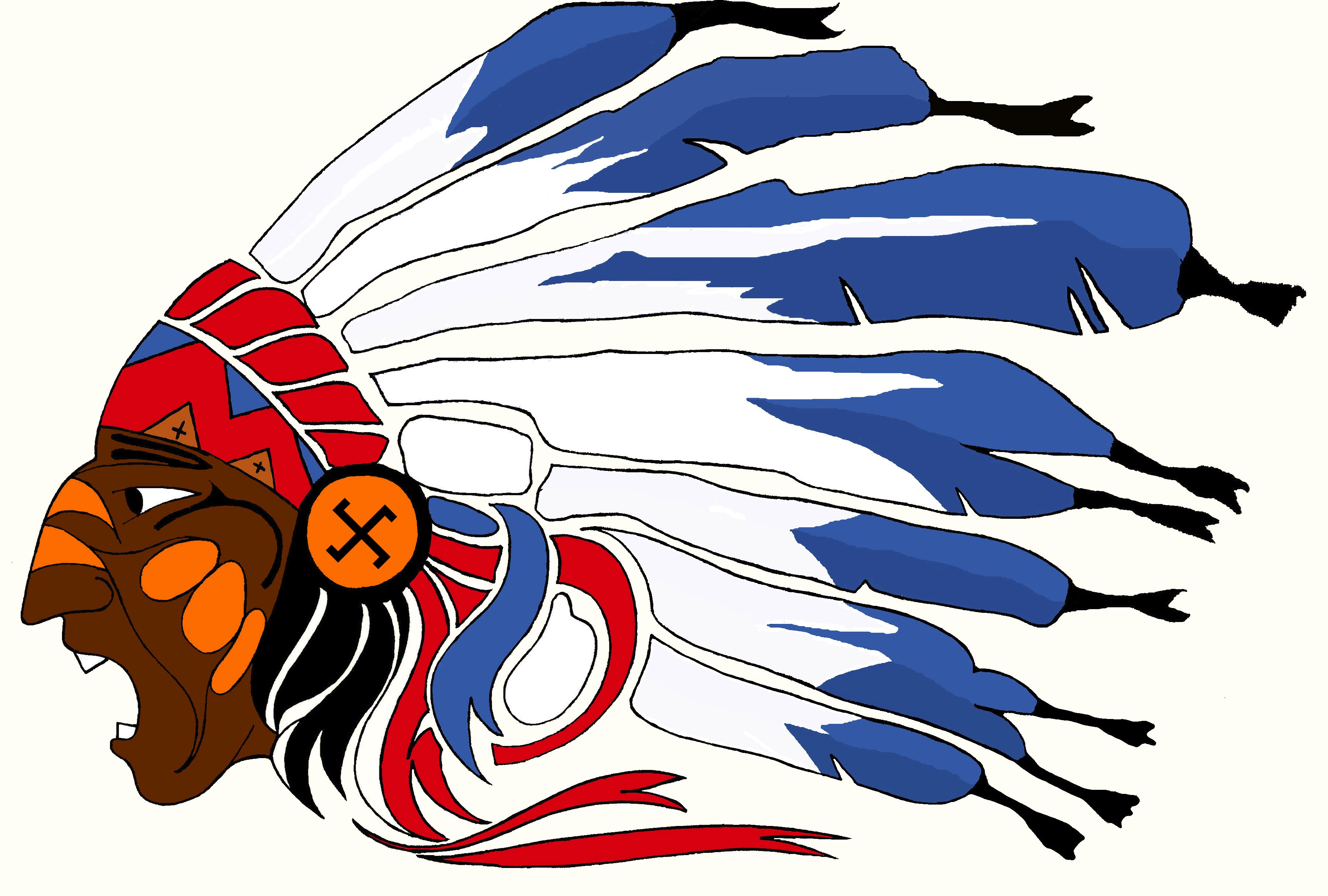
The emblem of the Lafayette Escadrille. Pavelka joined the unit in August 1916 after completing aviation training.

Pavelka first entered as a member of the French 170th Infantry Regiment and the Army of Counani in October 1914, before joining the French Foreign Legion in France after the army disbanded. On June 16, 1915, Pavelka was wounded in hand-to-hand combat near Givenchy, sustaining a bayonet wound to the leg. He and another soldier were wounded, while three other Americans were killed during the battle that day. After returning to duty, Pavelka fought in the Second Battle of Champagne alongside his regiment, also working as a message runner. On October 5, 1915, Pavelka was believed to be killed in the battle; but he was found several days later. In total, Pavelka fought in three battles.

In December 1915, Pavelka was transferred to French aviation, first enlisting on October 18, 1915. He took part in aviation school on December 10, 1915, joining the Lafayette Escadrille in August 1916 shortly after completing training. During his tenure at the aviation school in France, he set a record for pistol shooting in the air. He was first assigned a Nieuport 16 plane which had a history of accidents, deeming it "hoodoed". In December 1916, Pavelka requested to be part of the Army of the Orient, in which he was later sent to the Salonika front. Several days after arriving in Salonika in February 1917, he flew a Nieuport plane over enemy lines five hours a day. Midway through 1917, Pavelka was involved in a vehicle accident in which the vehicle fell down a ravine, injuring him. However, he resumed aviation less than two weeks after the accident. On August 13, 1917, the engine in the Nieuport 16 plane Pavelka was flying caught fire. Pavelka crashed the plane into a swamp after attempting to keep the flames away from its cockpit. He fled from the plane before it exploded and was shelled by German forces. On October 30, 1916, while part of the Lafayette Escadrille, Pavelka was awarded the Croix de Guerre and cited for combating enemy forces by French general Maurice Sarrail, and promoted to sergeant rank.

In November 1917, Pavelka received internal injuries after being thrown and stampeded on by a horse, later dying on November 12 at age 26 near Monastir, North Macedonia. His funeral was held in Salonika, and he was buried at the Lafayette Escadrille Memorial Cemetery in Paris. Pavelka was the only American aviator killed along the front in Salonika and the first American soldier killed along the Macedonian front.

== Sources ==
- Hall, James Norman; Nordhoff, Charles Bernhard (2016). The Lafayette Flying Corps - Volume 1 (WWI Centenary Series). Read Books Limited. ISBN 9781473359772.
- Nordhoff, Charles (1920). The Lafayette Flying Corps Volume 1. Houghton Mifflin.
- Parsons, Edwin C. (2016). I Flew With the Lafayette Escadrille. Tannenberg Publishing. ISBN 9781786259943.
- Flood, Charles Bracelen (2015). First to Fly: The Story of the Lafayette Escadrille, the American Heroes Who Flew for France in World War I. Grove Atlantic. ISBN 9780802191380.
- Tom, Steven T. (2019). First to Fight: An American Volunteer in the French Foreign Legion and the Lafayette Escadrille in World War I. Stackpole Books. ISBN 9780811768108.
- Carroll, Andrew (2018). My Fellow Soldiers: General John Pershing and the Americans who Helped Win the Great War. Penguin Publishing Group. ISBN 9780143110811.
- Flammer, Philip M. (1981). The Vivid Air, the Lafayette Escadrille. University of Georgia Press. ISBN 9780820331263.
- Elmark, Nils (2023). Fighting for the French Foreign Legion: Americans who joined the First World War in 1914. Pen & Sword Military. ISBN 9781399069175.
- Ex Libris Volume 1, Issues 1-2. University of Illinois at Urbana-Champaign. 1923.
- Ruffin, Steven A. (2016). The Lafayette Escadrille: A Photo History of the First American Fighter Squadron. Casemate Publishers. ISBN 9781612003511.
- Cross & Cockade Journal Volume 19. Cross & Cockade, the Society of World War I Aero Historians. 1978.
