= Norman Prince =

Founder of the American Escadrille Squadron (1887–1916)

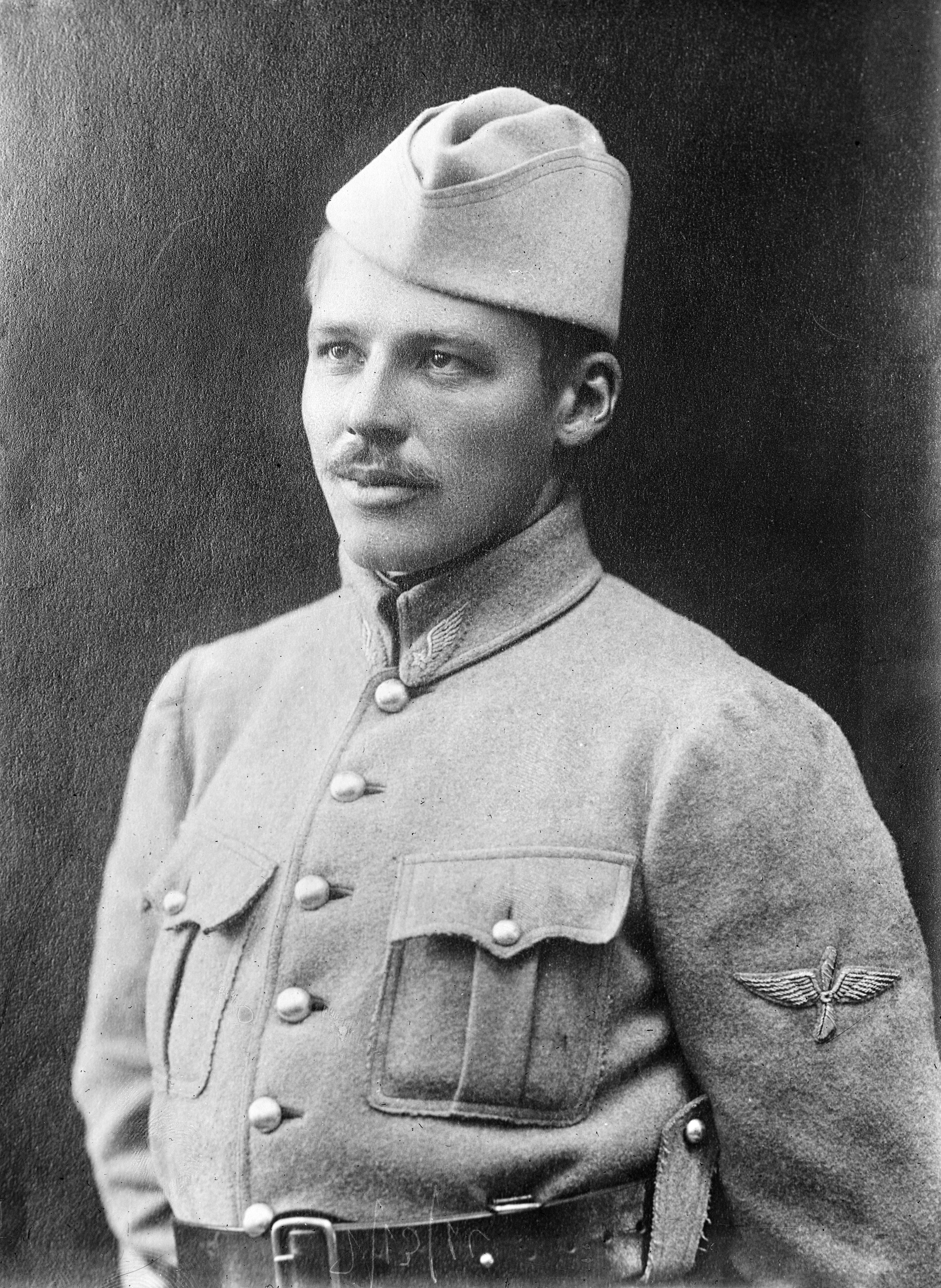
- Born: August 31, 1887; Beverly, Massachusetts, USA
- Died: October 15, 1916 (aged 29); Gérardmer, Lorraine, France
- Burial place: Washington National Cathedral, Washington, D.C., USA
- Military career
- Allegiance: USA, France
- Branch: French Aviation Service
- Service years: August 1915-1916
- Rank: Sergeant
- Unit: Escadrille C.124
- Awards: Croix de Guerre; Médaille Militaire; Croix de la Légion d'Honneur

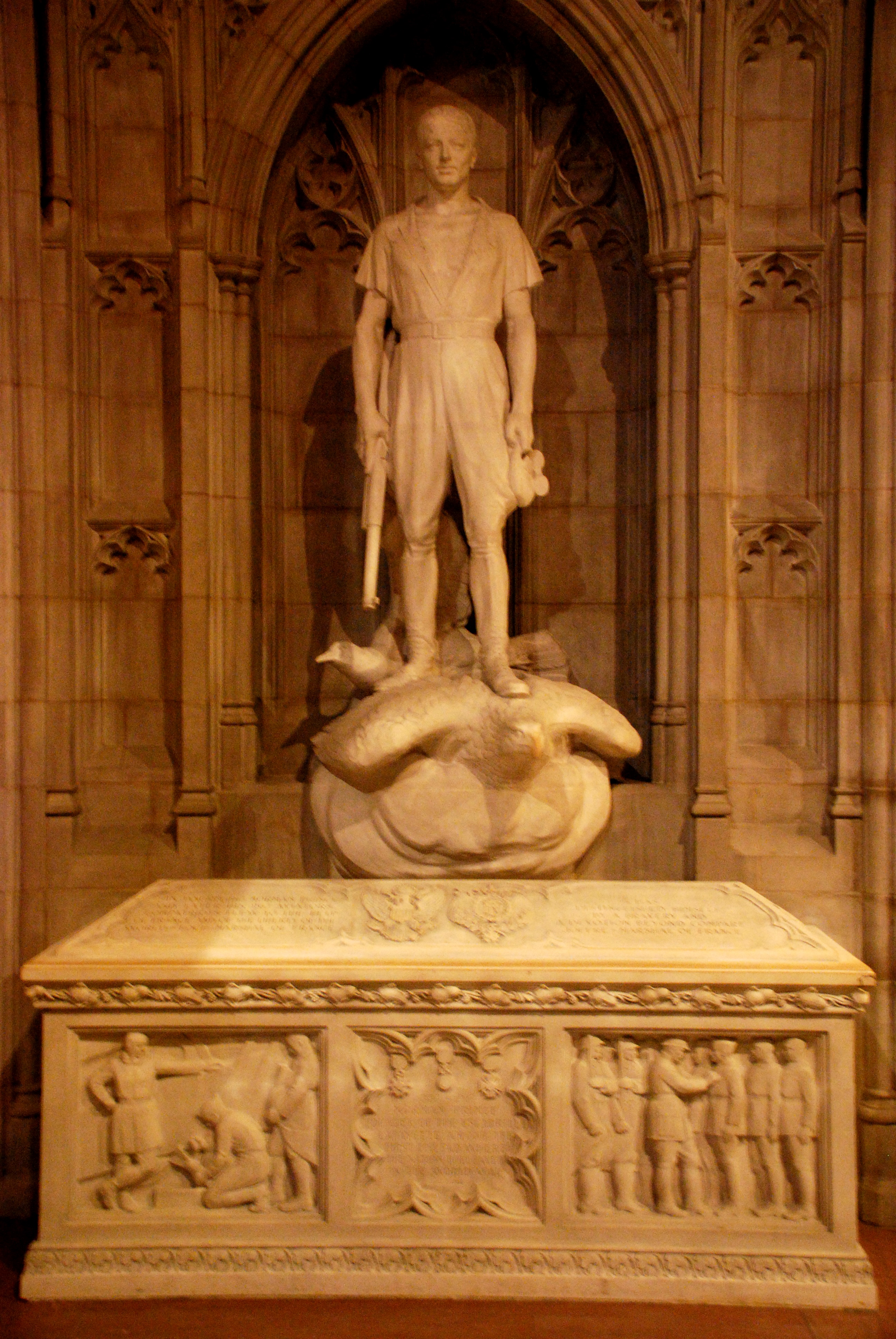
Grave of Norman Prince in the Washington National Cathedral

Norman Prince (August 31, 1887 – October 15, 1916) was an American aviator and leading founder of France's Lafayette Escadrille.

== Biography ==
He was born on August 31, 1887, in Beverly, Massachusetts. He was son of Frederick Henry Prince and Abigail Kinsley Norman.

Prince attended the Groton School, graduated from Harvard College, cum laude, in 1908 and Harvard Law School in 1911.

Prince, under the alias 'George Manor' to conceal his flight training from his father, was the 55th American to be licensed to fly an airplane by the Aero Club of America. He passed his test on August 28, 1911, at Squantum, Massachusetts, flying a Burgess with a Wright motor.

Prince was practicing law in Chicago when he joined a group to build and race a plane in the Gordon Bennett Cup Race. They hired Starling Burgess to build their plane in his boat yard in Marblehead, Massachusetts, in 1912. In 1910, Norman's family had bought an estate in Pau, France, known as "Villa Ste Helene". The estate, with its house, still stands at 29 Avenue Norman-Prince, and contains a painting of Prince standing next to an aircraft. The year before the Prince family purchased the estate, the Wright Brothers had traveled to Pau, and made many well-publicized flights there, carrying passengers, and training pilots.

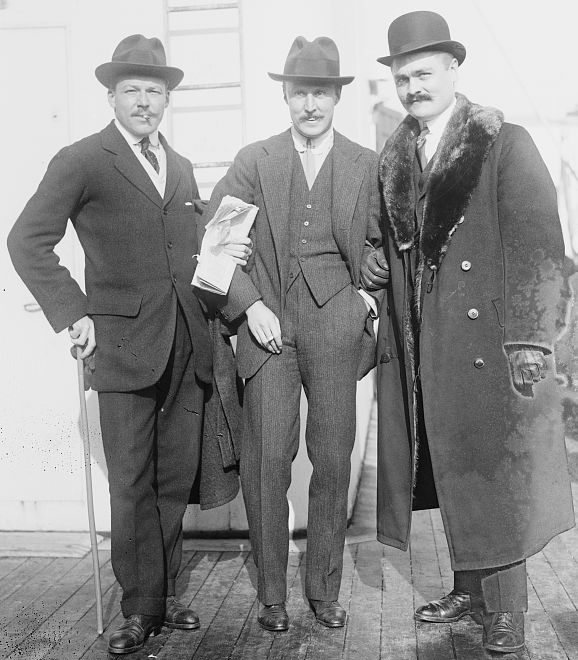
Elliott Christopher Cowdin II (left), Norman Prince (center), William Thaw II (right) on December 23, 1915- all American aviators that served in the French Army

In January 1915, Prince, who spoke fluent French, sailed to France, and finally persuaded the French to allow the founding of the American Escadrille (squadron) in April 1916.

Captain Georges Thenault, the Escadrille's commander, credits Prince for conceiving the idea of bringing together his countrymen with some of those of the French Foreign Legion in a squadron of flyers to be initially known as the Escadrille Américaine. He formed the squadron with William Thaw II, Elliot C. Cowdin, Frazier Curtis, Victor Chapman, and Greeley S. Curtis Jr. Elliott C. Cowdin, in an article which he published in the Harvard Alumni Bulletin (March 7, 1918) gave the full credit for the formation of this flying corps and for its incorporation in the French flying service to the energy and persistence of Norman Prince.

As an aviator, serving as a sergeant in the French air service, Prince was involved in 122 aerial combat engagements in which he was officially credited with five victories. He was also thought to have brought down four additional hostile planes which were not confirmed. Note - Sources vary as to how many aerial victories Prince had. Estimates range from zero to five.

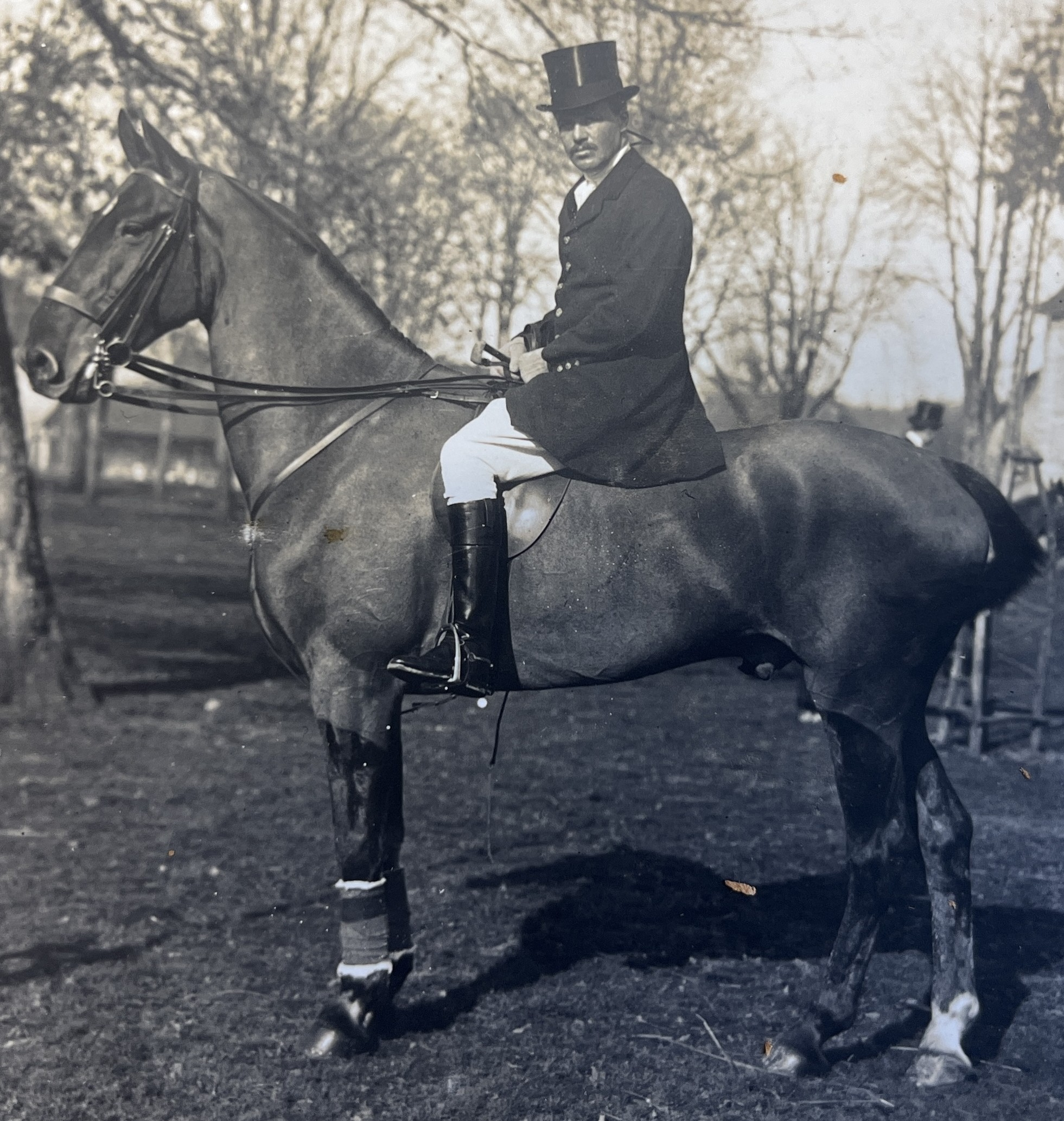
Norman Prince at a Pau Hunt meet.

Prince was awarded the French Legion of Honor, Médaille Militaire and Croix de Guerre.

On October 12, 1916, Prince flew as an escort for a bombing raid on the Mauser rifle works at Oberndorf, Germany during which he shot down an enemy plane. Returning to base, his landing wheels hit telegraph cables near his air base and his plane flipped over and crashed.

Prince was severely injured and died on October 15, 1916. On his deathbed he was promoted to sous lieutenant and awarded the Legion of Honor. His body was returned to the United States and buried in an elaborate tomb at the National Cathedral in Washington, D.C.
