= Alfred de Laage de Meux =

French aviator (1891–1917)

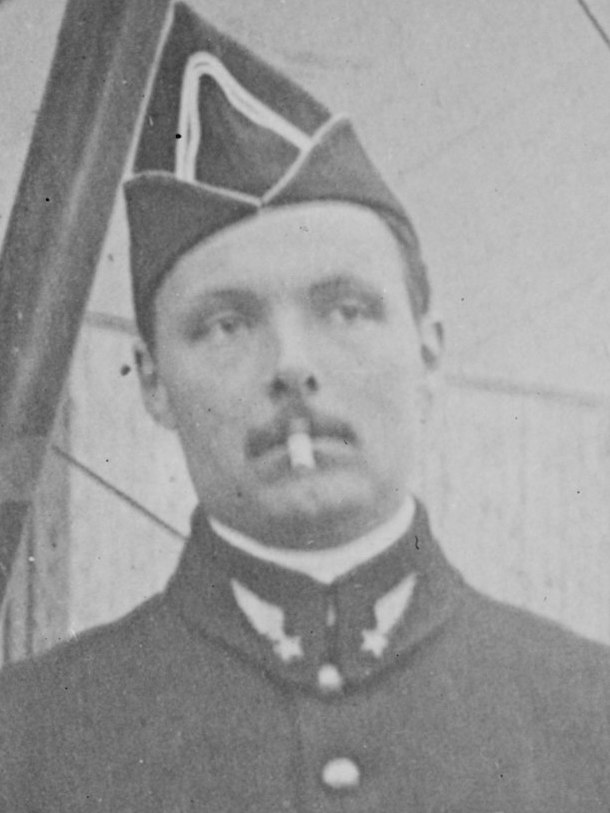
- de Meux, ca. 1915–1917
- Born: 24 September 1891; Clessé, Deux-Sèvres, France
- Died: 23 May 1917 (aged 25); Ham, Somme, France
- Burial place: Ham, Somme, France
- Military career
- Allegiance: United States/France
- Branch: Aviation
- Rank: Lieutenant
- Unit: Lafayette Escadrille
- Conflicts: World War I

Alfred de Laage de Meux (24 September 1891 – 23 May 1917) was a French lieutenant. He was one of the founders and second-in-command of the Lafayette Escadrille, serving under commander Georges Thenault. First serving as a cavalryman and second lieutenant for a separate regiment in World War I, he then entered the Service Aéronautique, serving as a machine gunner and observer, before receiving his flying certificate. After meeting Georges Thenault, he accepted his request to join the Lafayette Escadrille in 1916. De Meux was killed on 23 May 1917 when his plane crashed due to engine failure.

== Early life ==
Alfred de Laage de Meux was born on 24 September 1891, in Clessé, Deux-Sèvres, to an aristocratic French military family. Prior to World War I, he was interested in agricultural science, working as a farmer.

== World War I ==
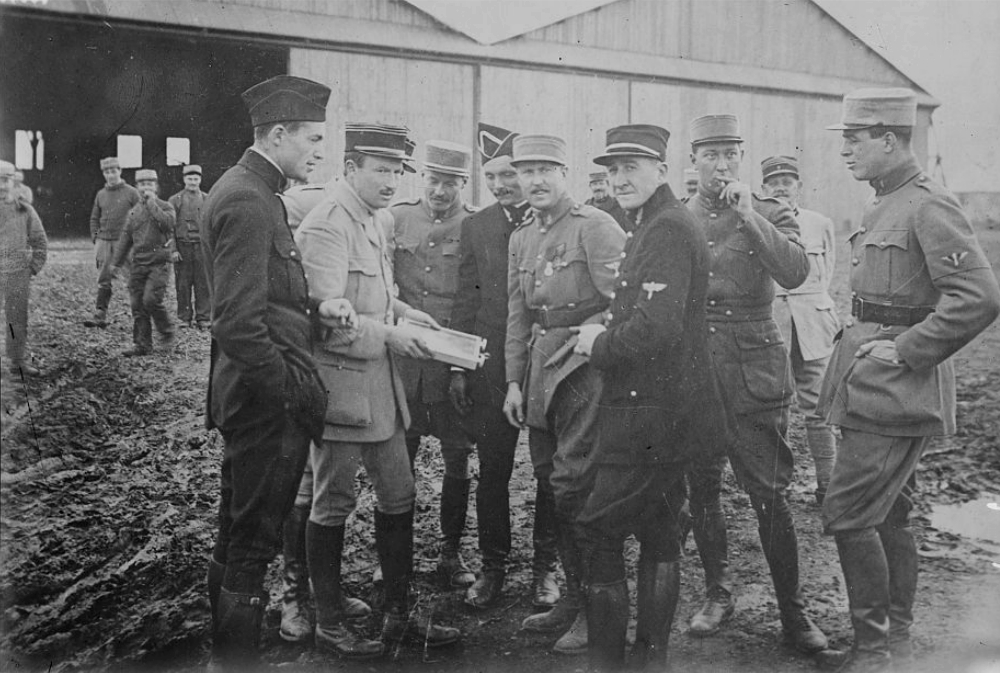
The aviators of the Lafayette Escadrille. De Meux is located fourth from the left.

De Meux first served as a cavalryman and second lieutenant for a regiment, before he was wounded in August 1914. Thereafter, he entered the Service Aéronautique in March 1915 as a machine gunner and observer after the regiment he first was in disbanded. While in a Caudron as an observer, he shot down a German enemy plane and received his second citation à l'ordre de l'armée. De Meux then transferred to aviation, working as an air gunner while also teaching himself how to operate aircraft. He became a pilot on 22 March 1915, becoming one of several aviators to receive his military flying certificate without attending aviation school. He first flew a Farman aircraft for several months, scoring a victory, before transferring to another regiment, and entering combat in the Battle of Verdun thereafter. De Meux then met Georges Thenault, commander of the Lafayette Escadrille, and Thenault requested De Meux to join the aviation unit. De Meux accepted Thenault's request, becoming second-in-command of the unit in Luxeuil on 20 April 1916. Thenault and De Meux became the only two French aviators in the Lafayette Escadrille, though there were French ground crews and mechanics in the aviation unit.

He entered combat on 8 April 1917, shooting down two planes. De Meux was killed on 23 May 1917, in Ham, Somme, France, shortly after departing from an aerodrome. His plane's engine failed, causing the plane to lose flying speed, eventually crashing and killing De Meux. His funeral was held in Ham. De Meux was described as "a terror in the sky" and, by pilots under his command, "the man in the French Army" and "the finest man I ever knew", the latter of which described following De Meux weeping after a pilot under his command was killed.

== Sources ==
- Ruffin, Steven A. (2016). The Lafayette Escadrille: A Photo History of the First American Fighter Squadron. Casemate Publishers. ISBN 978-1-61200-351-1.
- Nordhoff, Charles (1920). The Lafayette Flying Corps: Volume 1. Houghton Mifflin.
- Flammer, Philip M. (1981). The Vivid Air, the Lafayette Escadrille. University of Georgia Press. ISBN 978-0-8203-3126-3.
- Hall, James Norman; Nordhoff, Charles Bernhard (2016). The Lafayette Flying Corps - Volume 1 (WWI Centenary Series). Read Books Limited. ISBN 978-1-4733-5977-2.
- Miller, Roger G. (2015). Like A Thunderbolt: The Lafayette Escadrille And The Advent Of American Pursuit In World War I (Illustrated ed.). Tannenburg Publishing. ISBN 978-1-78625-247-0.
- Treadwell, Terry C. (2020). Strike from the Air: The Early Years of the US Air Forces. Pen & Sword Books. ISBN 978-1-5267-7646-4.
- Tom, Steven T. (2019). First to Fight: An American Volunteer in the French Foreign Legion and the Lafayette Escadrille in World War I. Stackpole Books. ISBN 978-0-8117-6810-8.
- Bruce, Robert Bowman (2003). A Fraternity of Arms: America and France in the Great War. University Press of Kansas. ISBN 978-0-7006-1253-6.
