= William Thaw =

William Thaw may refer to:

- William Thaw Sr. (1818–1889), American railroad baron
- William Thaw II (1893–1934), American aviator who fought in World War I
