= Victor Chapman =

World War I pilot

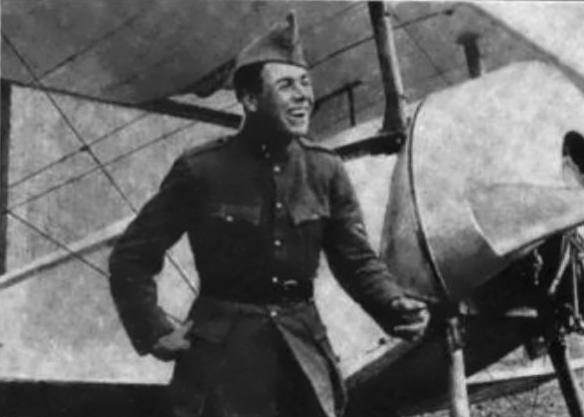
- Chapman in 1916
- Born: Victor Chapman; April 17, 1890; New York City, U.S.
- Died: June 24, 1916 (aged 26); Douaumont, France
- Burial place: Meuse-Argonne American Cemetery and Memorial
- Military career
- Allegiance: United States/France
- Branch: Aviation/Infantry
- Service years: 1915–1916
- Rank: Sergeant
- Unit: Lafayette Escadrille
- Conflicts: First World War: Battle of Verdun †
- Awards: Medaille Militaire, Croix de Guerre with two Palms.

Victor Emmanuel Chapman (April 17, 1890 – June 23, 1916) was a French-American pilot remembered for his exploits during World War I. He was the first American pilot to die in the war.

== Growing up ==
Chapman was born in New York City to essayist John Jay Chapman and Minna Timmins (who died in 1897). He and his father moved to France soon after. In France, Chapman obtained dual-citizen status as a French and US citizen.

His father remarried, to Elizabeth Chanler, a sister of William A. Chanler from the Astor family, when Chapman was a teenager around 16 years old. Chapman returned to the United States in his late teens to attend Fay School (Class of 1903), St Paul's School, Concord, NH, and Harvard University. After graduating, Chapman returned to Europe, spending time in France and in Germany.

== Fighting in the war ==
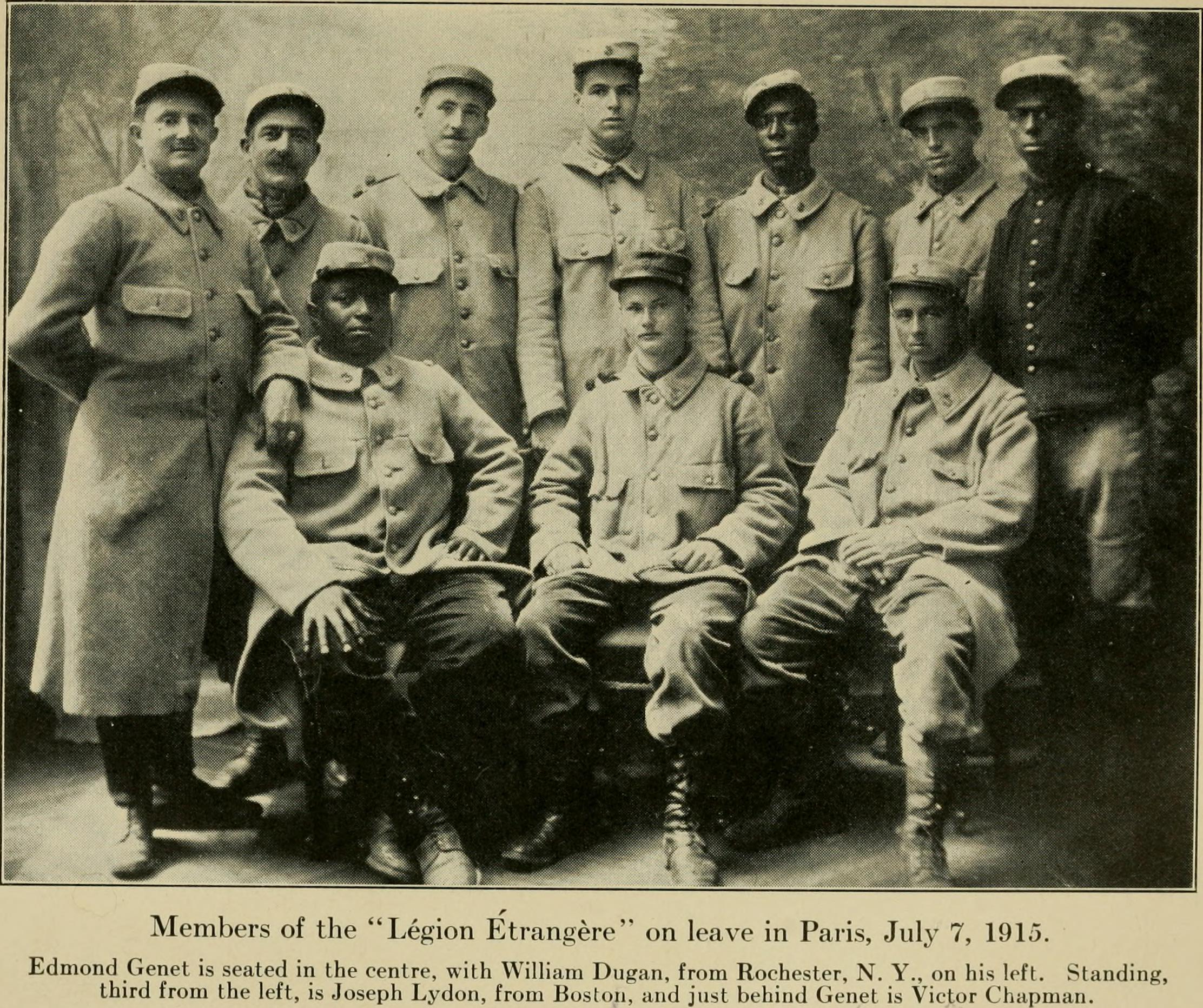
Chapman is in the center in the back row.

When World War I broke out, his father and stepmother moved to London, England. However, Chapman decided to stay in France, joining the French Foreign Legion on August 30, 1914, and served in the 3rd March regiment of the Legion. He became friendly with four men during his days in the trenches: a Polish fighter who was known only as "Kohl", and Americans Alan Seeger, Henry Fansworth, and David King. The trio of Americans watched as Kohl was killed by a bullet while walking with his friends. He was also friends with Edmond Genet.

After Kohl's death, Chapman and two other friends, (Norman Prince and Elliot Cowdin), were given an opportunity to fly in a fighter airplane. Chapman requested a transfer to the Aéronautique Militaire, the army's air arm. He attended flight school and was certified as a pilot.

Chapman flew many missions for the 1st Aviation Group and was promoted to sergeant. He was chosen as one of the founding members of N.124, the Escadrille Americaine, also known as the Lafayette Escadrille. On June 17, 1916, he was flying over the Verdun sector when he was attacked by four German aircraft. During the engagement, Chapman suffered a head wound, most likely from an attack by then four-victory German flier Walter Höhndorf. Chapman landed his aircraft safely, with Höhndorf getting his fifth victory as a result. While recovering Chapman found out that his friend, Clyde Balsley had been wounded in a separate incident. Prior to his last flight Chapman loaded oranges onto his aircraft, intending to take these to Balsley who was in the hospital recuperating from his wounds. On June 24, 1916, while en route to Balsley, Chapman was again attacked, north of Douaumont by German flying ace Leutnant Kurt Wintgens, a close friend of Höhndorf. With Wintgens flying a Halberstadt D.II that day against Chapman's Nieuport 11, Wintgens soon gained the upper hand and Chapman was shot down and killed.

A memorial service was held on the 4th of July for Chapman. The service, which was held at the American Church in Paris, included many of the American ambassador to France, American residents of Paris and any American soldiers in France that could make it.

== Awards and medals ==
Chapman earned many medals and commendations during his military career. Chapman was interested in the arts and in writing. He often found inspiration to write while he was in the middle of battles, and many of the letters he sent to his father were written in these circumstances. A book of these letters, called Victor Chapman's Letters from France, with a memoir by John Jay Chapman was published in 1917 after his death. In his memory, the composer Charles Martin Loeffler, a friend of Chapman's father, composed his quartet Music for Four Stringed Instruments. A cenotaph in his honor was erected in St. Matthew's Episcopal Churchyard, Bedford, New York.

== Bibliography ==
- Chapman, Victor Emmanuel; Chapman, John Jay (1917). Victor Chapman's letters from France, with memoir. New York: The Macmillan Company.
