= Willis Bradley Haviland =

American aviator (1890–1944)

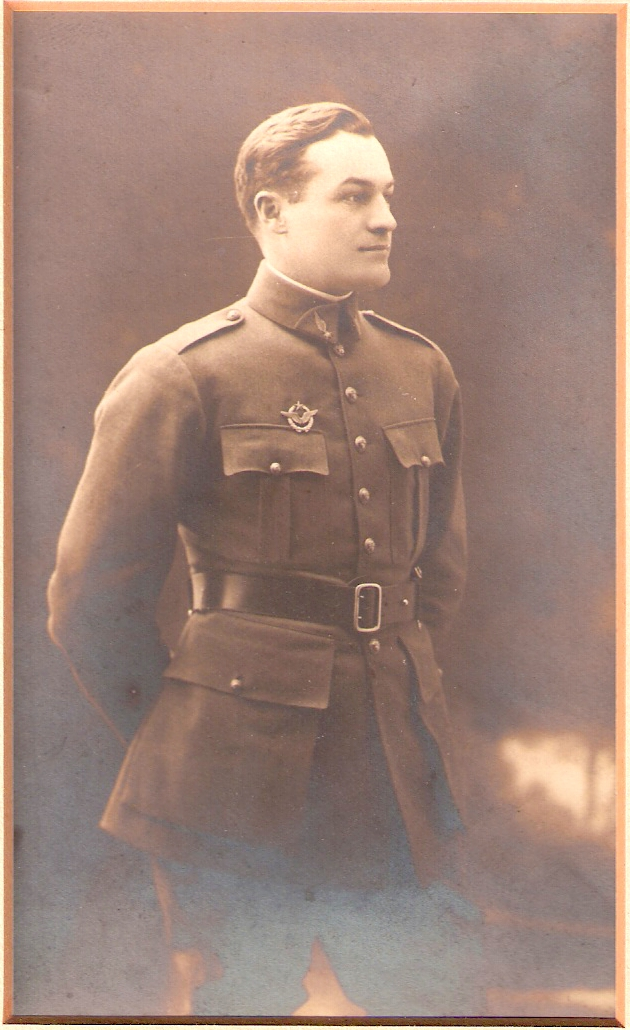
- Lafayette Escadrille Aviator
- Born: 10 March 1890; Minneapolis, Minnesota, US
- Died: 28 November 1944 (aged 54); Corona, California, US
- Resting place: Arlington National Cemetery
- Occupations: Naval Air Combat Pilot; Naval Air Station Commander
- Employer(s): French Foreign Legion, French Air Service, United States Navy
- Known for: Pilot in the Lafayette Escadrille, First pilot to launch a plane from a battleship
- Spouse: Mary Lucile Satterthwaite
- Children: 1 daughter
- Parent(s): Senator Dr. Willis Henry Haviland (father); Grace Hynes (mother)
- Relatives: Co-founders of Haviland & Co. (cousins); Willis Haviland Carrier (cousin)

Commander Willis Bradley Haviland (10 March 1890 – 28 November 1944) was a pioneer military pilot in World War I and a naval air station commanding officer in World War II. As the sixteenth American volunteer in the Lafayette Escadrille, he was among the first air combat pilots to fight the Germans in World War I, before the United States officially entered the war. He would later become the first pilot to launch a plane from a battleship.

== Early life ==
Born on 10 March 1890 in Minneapolis, Minnesota, Willis was the only son of Dr. Willis Henry Haviland (10 September 1864 – 15 January 1939) by his first wife, Grace Hynes. His parents divorced 28 June 1895, when he was only about 5 years old, and Dr. Haviland remarried to Mary Page Irvine on 22 Jul 1895 in Butte, Montana. Willis Bradley Haviland would remain close to his biological mother well into his adulthood.

He attended Kemper Military School and Iowa State College of Agriculture and Mechanic Arts at Ames.

His father was elected a Montana state senator in 1906 for one term in the Democratic Party. Meanwhile, young Willis B. Haviland enlisted in the United States Navy from 1907 to 1911. When war broke out in Europe, Willis joined the American Field Service (American Ambulance Corp, nicknamed "Friends of France") in 1915. There he drove ambulances for seventeen months at the Alsace front. When the Field Service and American Ambulance severed ties in the summer of 1916, Willis received a pilot's license on 7 September in that year and entered the American Escadrille (soon afterward renamed Lafayette Escadrille), becoming the sixteenth American volunteer pilot in the squadron.

== Aviation career ==
Willis Bradley Haviland was primarily an escort and reconnaissance pilot in the Lafayette Escadrille, and occasionally was assigned a bombing run. He was permitted only to engage in air combat with the enemy in defense. Consequently, he earned only two confirmed "kills" in this time period, not nearly as many as his ace peers who had more aggressive assignments. He was adept at keeping his plane out of the enemy's firing angle, and if provoked he was skilled enough to send the German and Austrian pilots into retreat when he turned on them.

After the United States joined the war, Haviland became executive officer of a naval air station at Dunkirk, France, with one month of special duty in the 13th Squadron RNAS flying a Sopwith Camel single-seater biplane. In July, 1918, Lt. Haviland was reassigned to command the naval air station (263ª Squadriglia) near the village of Porto Corsini in Italy and train pilots there. "So successfully did the station carry out its mission that Admiral H. T. Mayo, USN, stated on the basis of his inspection 10 November 1918, that the station had 'the distinction of being the most heavily engaged unit of the U.S. Naval Forces in Europe.'"

Following the war, Lt. Haviland was assigned to the USS Texas (BB-35) near Guantánamo Bay as a combat pilot. There, he became the first pilot to launch a plane off a U.S. battleship, and the first pilot to launch a military aircraft off any ship, motivating the United States to begin developing the first military aircraft carriers. The idea was inspired by experiments in 1910 when stunt aviator Eugene Ely launched a Curtiss Model D (non-military) biplane off of a custom platform built onto the United States Cruiser USS Birmingham. Haviland's idea, which he had proposed to Captain Nathan C. Twining on the USS Texas (BB-35), was to build a 40-foot-long (12 m), 12-foot-wide (3.7 m) runway of timbers lashed together on the Number 2 guns of the battleship's forward deck. His Sopwith Camel biplane would then be winched down on the runway and its wheels held by a bridle to be released at Haviland's command, after the plane's propeller had sufficient speed for takeoff. "Haviland climbed into the cockpit and revved and raced the plane's motor until it seemed to the nearby sailors that the prop blast and vibration would tear the fuselage apart. Haviland signaled for the cables to be released. The straining aircraft roared down the runway, dropped precipitously toward the sea, then climbed into the sky."

Lt. Haviland subsequently served on the USS Oklahoma, whose fate would end at Pearl Harbor in 1941. In 1942, Haviland became the executive officer assigned to the establishment of a naval air station on Whidbey Island, Washington, which was commissioned 21 September 1942. He assumed the role of commanding officer of that station in November 1943 upon the detachment of the previous CO, Captain Cyril T. Simard. On 18 February 1944 Captain Willis B. Haviland was appointed the role officially by the Bureau of Personnel, which he held until 1 September 1944 when his superior officers, impressed by his efficient management of the facility, asked him to relinquish command for a special assignment in the Central Pacific War Zone.

== Death ==
Captain Willis B. Haviland fell ill at the time of his accepting the new position in the Central Pacific, delaying his assignment. He died suddenly at the naval hospital at Corona, California, on 28 November 1944. He is interred at Arlington National Cemetery in Arlington, Virginia, in Section 8, Site 6024.

== Honors ==
Haviland's piloting skills in World War I earned him a U.S. Navy Cross, a French Croix de Guerre with two palms and one star, a Belgian Croix de guerre with palm, an Italian Croce di Guerra ("Cross of War"), and an Italian Medal of Military Valor. Pilots under his command at Porto Corsini, Italy won sixteen Navy Crosses and one Congressional Medal of Honor, the latter being Ensign Charles Hammann.

== Family and genealogy ==
Willis Bradley Haviland's father was Dr. Willis Henry Haviland, M.D., born 10 Sep 1864 in Haviland Hollow, Putnam County, NY, died 15 Jan 1939 in Butte, Silver Bow County, MT. He was a career physician, and a Montana State Senator in 1906–1910 (Democratic Party). Willis Henry Haviland married 5 Jun 1889 in St. Paul, Minnesota to Grace Hynes (born 31 Oct 1866 in Kenosha, Wisconsin), who was Willis Bradley Haviland's mother. They divorced 28 Jun 1895, and Dr. Haviland remarried 22 Jul 1895 in Butte, Montana to Mary Page Irvine who was born in 1870 and died 19 Jun 1956. Dr. Haviland had two daughters with Mary, being: Katherine Irvine and Elizabeth; Willis Bradley Haviland's half-sisters. Dr. Haviland married a third time, to Frances Elbert Harris, born ca 1881 and died 13 Aug 1944.

Willis Bradley Haviland married Mary Lucile Satterthwaite, a cousin of U.S. Senator George Smathers of Florida and had one daughter, Barbara Grace Haviland who married James Burlon Lamm. Barbara's son, Willis Haviland Lamm, inherited Willis Bradley Haviland's scrapbooks, documents and memorabilia.
