= Lafayette Escadrille =

U.S. volunteer unit constituted in 1916 under French command

Escadrille La Fayette
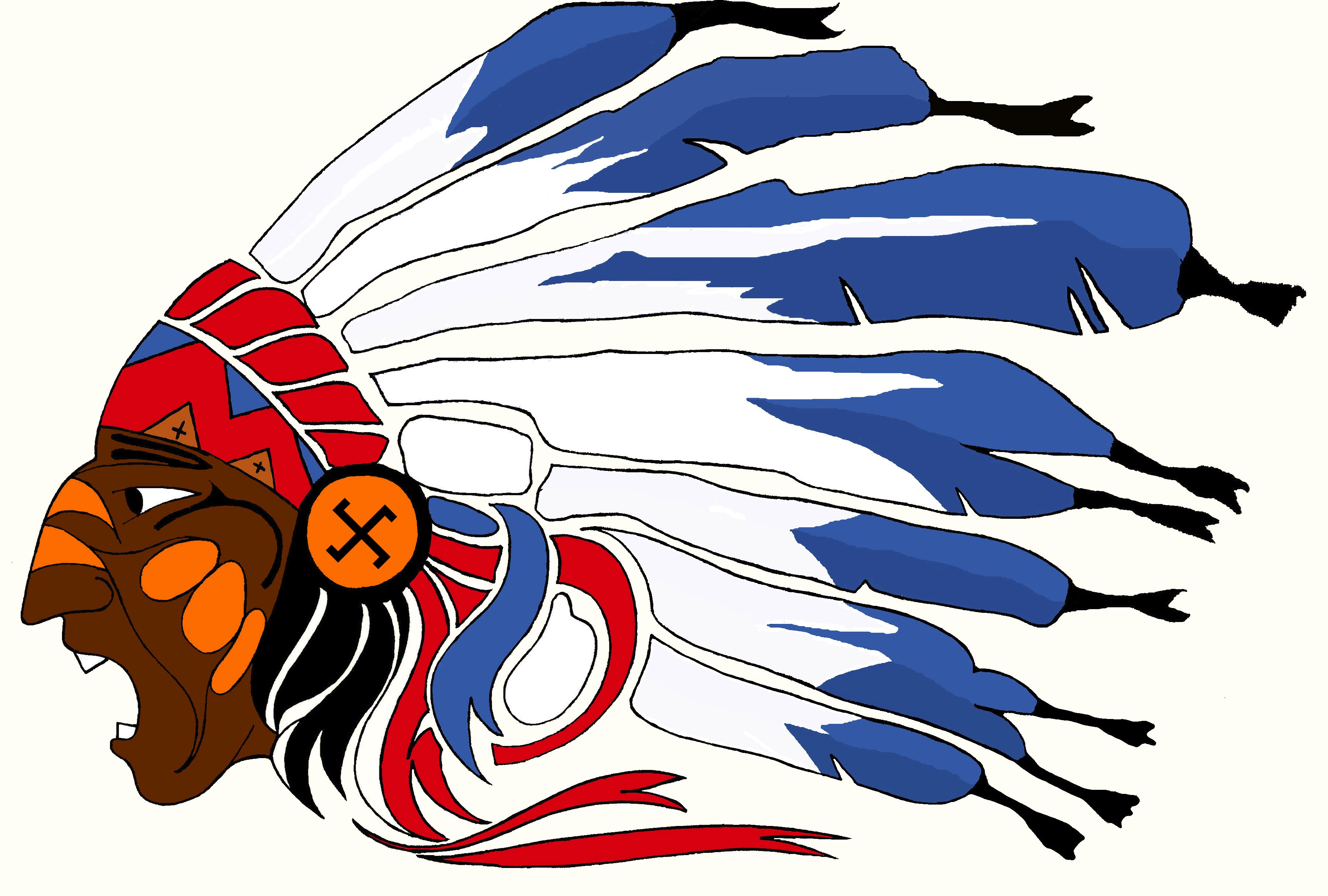
- Insignia of the N 124; La Fayette Escadrille
- Active: 1916–1917
- Allegiance: France
- Branch: Aéronautique Militaire; Military Aeronautics
- Type: Fighter Squadron
- Engagements: World War I

The La Fayette Escadrille (French: Escadrille de La Fayette) was the name of the French Air Force unit escadrille N 124 during the First World War (1914–1918). This escadrille of the Aéronautique Militaire was composed largely of American volunteer pilots flying fighters. It was named in honor of the Marquis de Lafayette, French hero of the American Revolutionary War. In September 1917, the escadrille was transferred to the United States Army under the designation 103rd Aero Squadron. In 1921, the French Air Force recreated a N124 unit who claimed lineage from the war-time La Fayette escadrille and is now part of the escadron 2/4 La Fayette.

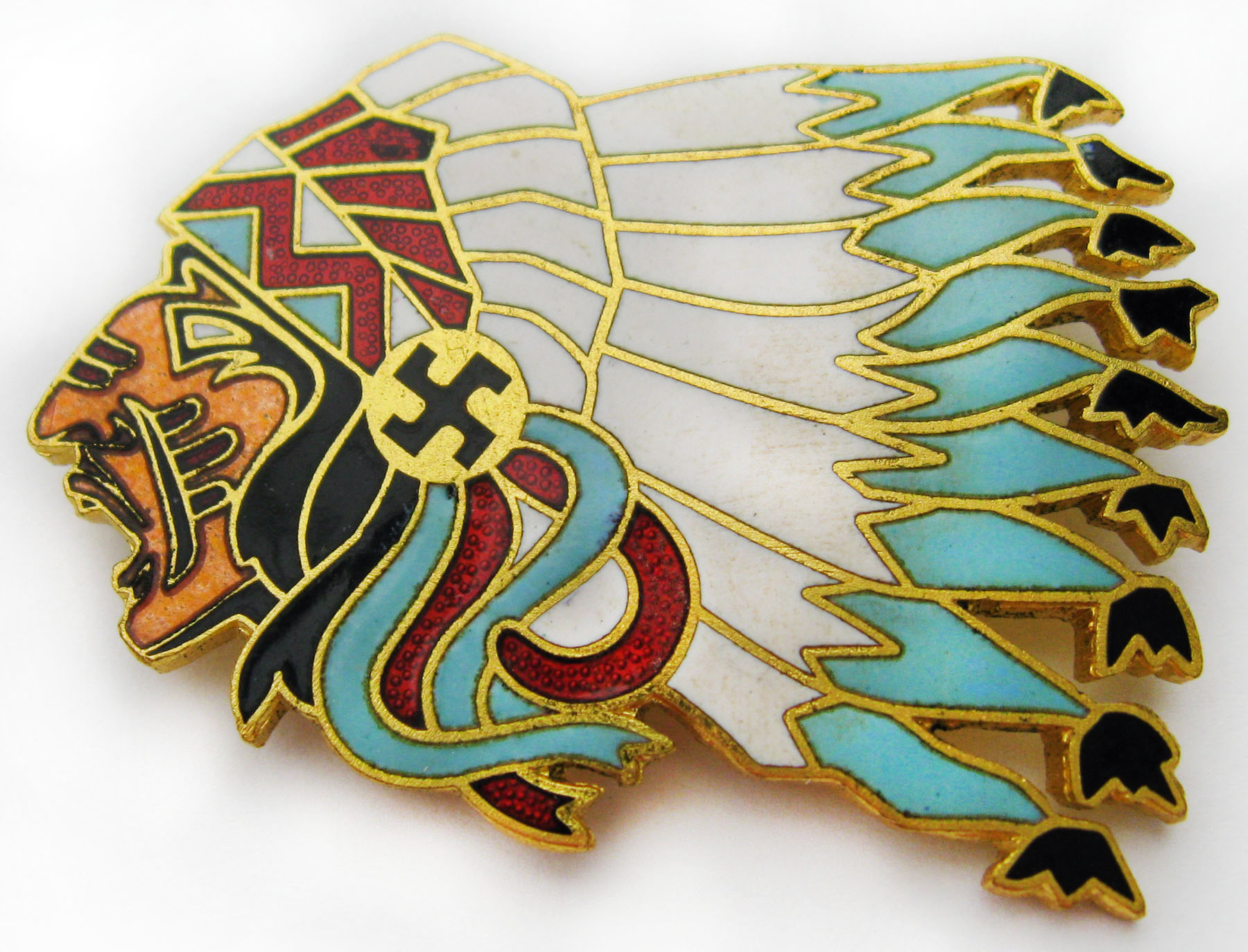
Lafayette Escadrille Pin (Escadrille N 124) with bust of Chief Sitting Bull. Chief Sitting Bull N124 was conserved by EC 2/4 La Fayette of the French Air Force.

== History ==
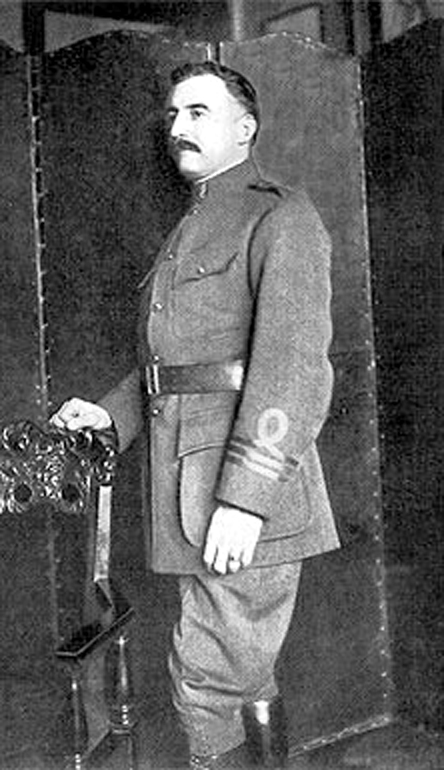
Dr. Edmund Gros

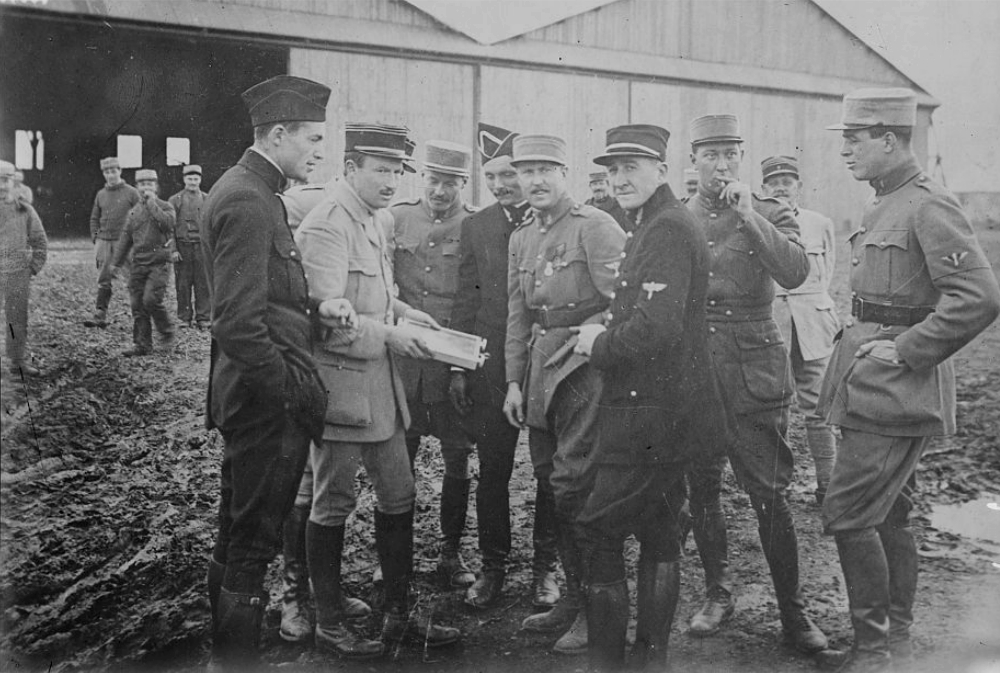
Kiffin Rockwell, Capt. Georges Thenault, Norman Prince, Lt. Alfred de Laage de Meux, Elliot Cowdin, Bert Hall, James McConnell and Victor Chapman (left to right)

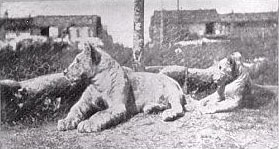
The mascots of the Lafayette Escadrille were the two lion cubs Whiskey and Soda

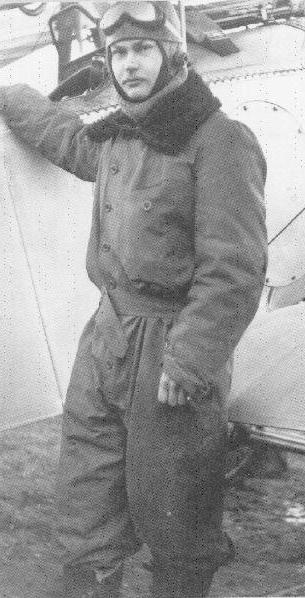
Edmond Charles Clinton Genet was the first American to die after America entered the war against Germany.

Dr. Edmund L. Gros, a founder of the American Hospital of Paris and organizer of the American Ambulance Field Service, and Norman Prince, a Harvard-educated lawyer and an American expatriate already flying for France, led the attempts to persuade the French government of the value of a volunteer American air unit fighting for France. The aim was to have their efforts recognized by the American public and thus, it was hoped, the resulting publicity would rouse interest in abandoning neutrality and joining the fight. Authorized by the French Air Department on March 21, 1916, the Escadrille de Chasse Nieuport 124 (Escadrille Américaine) was deployed on April 20 in Luxeuil-les-Bains, France, near Switzerland's border. Despite the unit's weak notorious status in the United States, the Escadrille proved useful for the French and Americans, taking into consideration that before the First World War, aircraft were not considered combat units. Initially, there were seven Americans pilots: Victor E. Chapman, Elliott C. Cowdin, Bert Hall, James Rogers McConnell, Norman Prince, Kiffin Rockwell, and William Thaw II. The full roster included 38 pilots.

The unit's aircraft, mechanics, and uniforms were French, as was the commander, Captain Georges Thénault. Five French pilots were also on the roster, serving at various times in command positions. Raoul Lufbery, a French-born American citizen, became the squadron's first, and ultimately their highest scoring flying ace, with 16 confirmed victories.

Two unofficial members of the Escadrille Américaine, lion cubs named Whiskey and Soda, provided countless moments of relief from battle stress to fliers. Whiskey was obtained first while the members of the escadrille had a few days off in Paris. Soda was obtained after Bill Thaw attempted to get Whiskey a glass eye. Both Whiskey and Soda were sent to the zoological gardens in Paris after the escadrille disbanded.

A German objection filed with the U.S. government, over the actions of a supposed neutral nation, led to the name change to La Fayette Escadrille in December 1916, as the original name implied that the U.S. was allied to France rather than neutral.

The Escadrille was disbanded on 18 February 1918. The American personnel transferred to the United States Army Air Service as the 103d Aero Squadron, while the French formed the Escadrille SPA.124 Jeanne d'Arc. A total of 224 Americans served in the unit. Of those, 51 died in combat, while another 11 died of other causes. Fifteen became prisoners of war. Eleven pilots became aces.

Not all American pilots were in the Lafayette Escadrille; over 200 fought for France as part of the La Fayette Flying Corps. (Note: Compared with the Lafayette Escadrille, larger numbers of American volunteers served with the Royal Flying Corps, Royal Naval Air Service and Royal Air Force during World War I.) On 3 April 1918, eleven American pilots from the Air Service of the American Expeditionary Force were assigned to Escadrille N.471, an air defense squadron stationed near Paris. (Note: Escadrille N.471 is listed by authoritative, Les escadrilles de l'aéronautique militaire française: symbolique et histoire, 1912–1920 (2004). Names of American pilots are provided in Lafayette Escadrille: America's Most Famous Squadron (2012). As for insignia, an American pennant on a staff crossed by an arrow and then a black buffalo on a yellow oval background with a black border were used. Walter A. Avery and Lancing C. Holden served with Escadrille N.471, among others.) American flyers served with this French unit until 18 July 1918, and it is sometimes referred to as the Second Escadrille Américaine.

Later, the Escadron de Chasse 2/4 La Fayette retook the unit designation of "La Fayette", this time however in the French Air Force.

== Combat ==
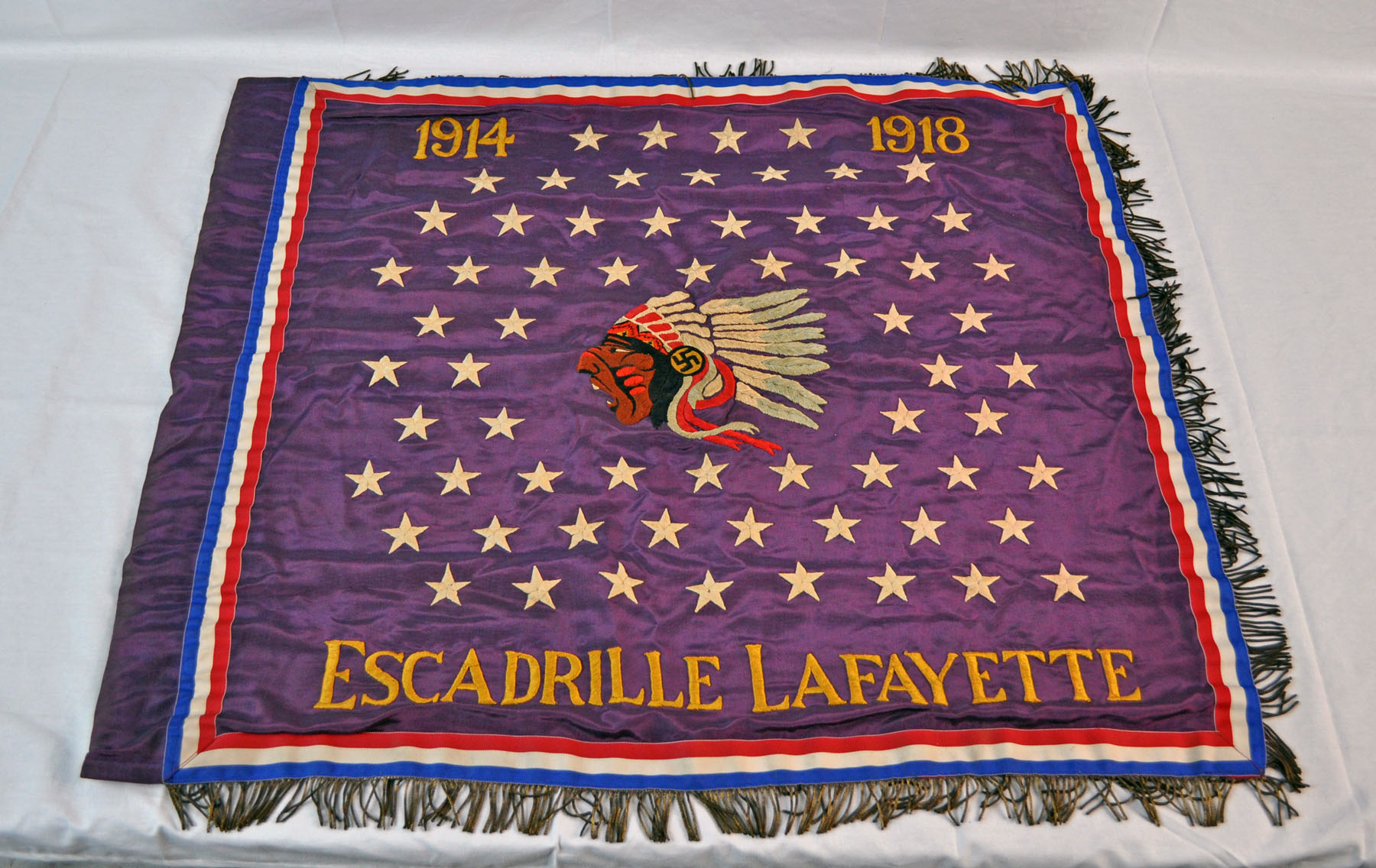
La Fayette Escadrille banner.

The first major action seen by the squadron was 13 May 1916 at the Battle of Verdun and five days later, Kiffin Rockwell recorded the unit's first aerial victory. On 23 June, the Escadrille suffered its first fatality when Victor Chapman was shot down over Douaumont. The unit was posted to the front until September 1916, when the unit was moved back to Luxeuil-les-Bains in 7 Army area. On 23 September, Rockwell was killed when his Nieuport was downed by the gunner in a German Albatros observation plane and in October, Norman Prince was fatally injured after crashing on final approach to his airfield. The squadron, flying Nieuport, later Spad, scouts, suffered heavy losses, but it received replacements until a total of 38 American pilots eventually served with the squadron. So many Americans volunteered to fly for France that they were eventually farmed out to other French squadrons. As a group, the Americans who flew in the war for France's air service, the Aéronautique militaire, are collectively known as the La Fayette Flying Corps. Altogether, 265 American volunteers served in the corps.

On 8 February 1918, the squadron was disbanded, and 12 of its American members inducted into the U.S. Air Service as members of the 103rd Aero Squadron. For a brief period, it retained its French aircraft and mechanics. Most of its veteran members were set to work training newly arrived American pilots. The 103rd was credited with a further 45 kills before the Armistice went into effect on 11 November. The French Escadrille SPA.124, also known as the Jeanne d'Arc Escadrille, continued Lafayette Escadrille's traditions in the Service Aéronautique.

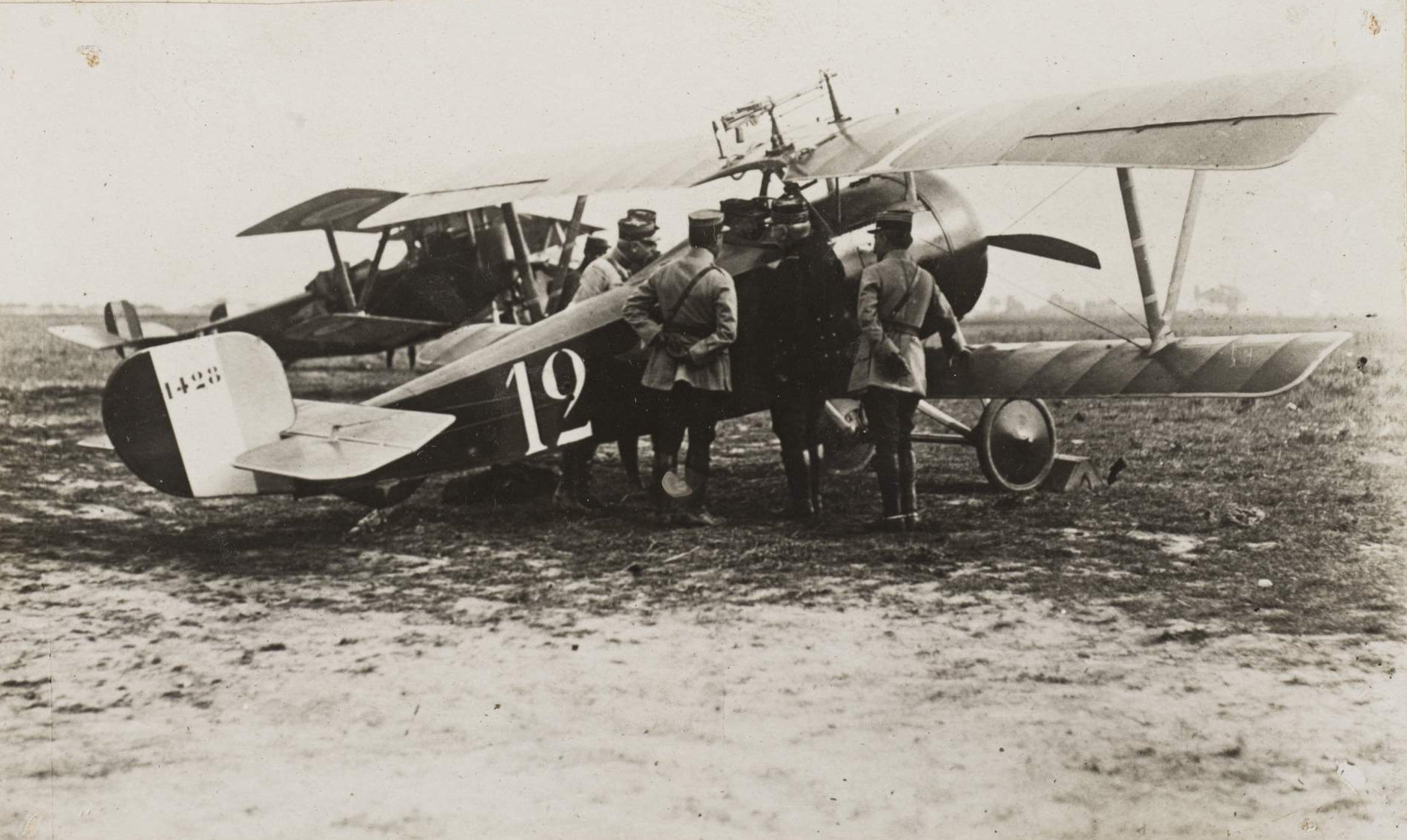
Nieuport 17 flown by René Dorme while with escadrille N.3 during the battle of the Somme, late 1916

World War I equipment in service
Equipment	Beginning	End
Nieuport 11 – Bébé	January 1916	March 1916
Société Pour L'Aviation et ses Dérivés SPAD VII	May 1916	1928
Nieuport 17	January 1916	November 1928

== Casualties ==
Nine pilots died in the Lafayette Escadrille while others perished after leaving the unit. More sustained non-fatal injuries. The planes flown were flimsy, and not as safe as those of later years. Engines and other parts failed, and machine-guns often jammed when they were needed. One man asked to be moved back to his infantry unit, where "he could be safe." The first pilot to be killed in action was Victor Chapman. Edmond Genet became the first American casualty of World War I following the U.S. entry into the war. Other Americans had died previous to the U.S. declaration of war, but since Genet had been active in the Escadrille since before the U.S. entry into the war, his death only a few days after the U.S. declaration of war made him the first official U.S. casualty.

== Members ==
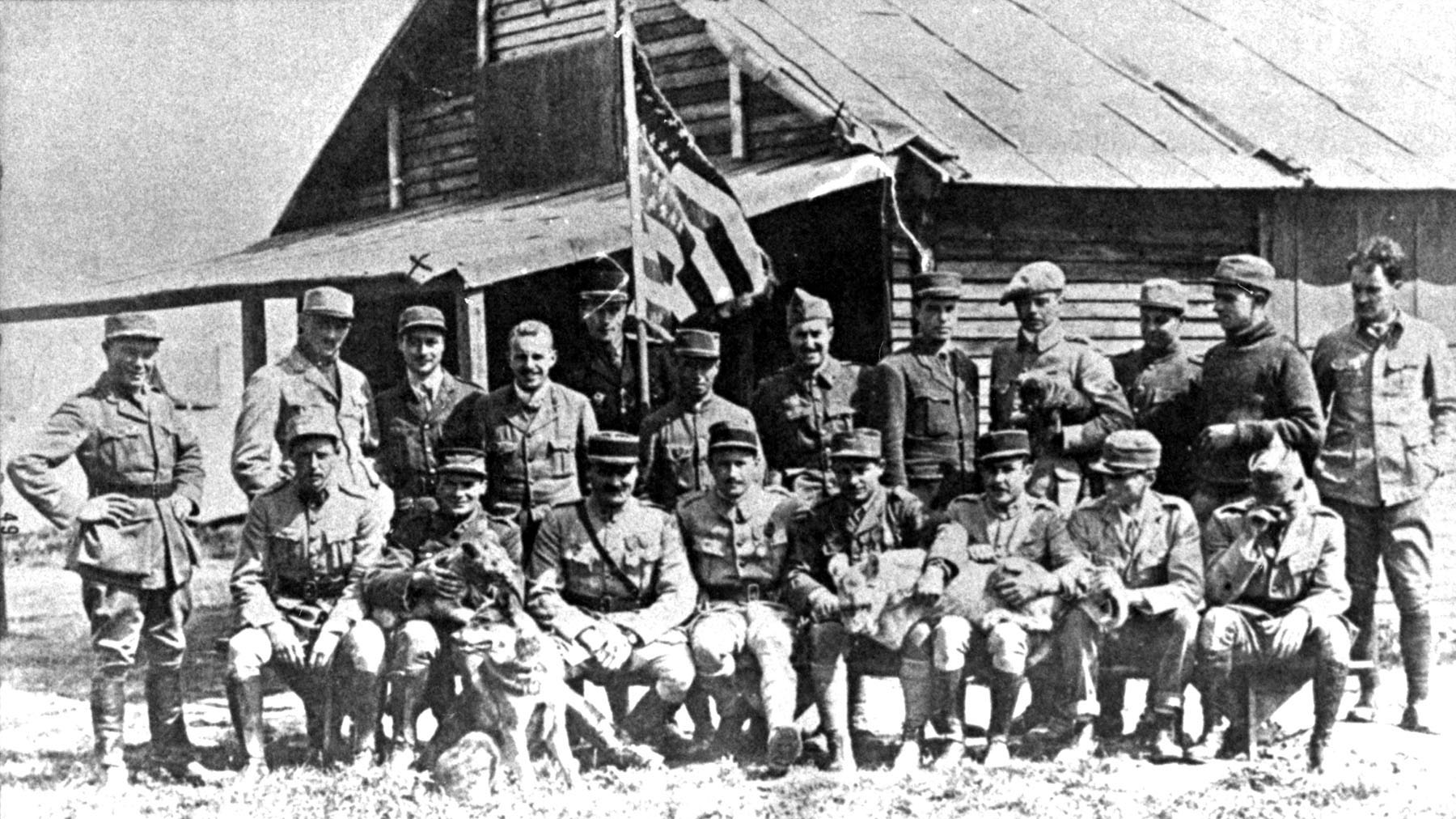
Standing (left to right) Soubiron, Doolittle, Campbell, Parsons, Bridgman, Dugan, MacMonagle, Lowell, Willis, Jones, Peterson and de Maison-Rouge. Seated (left to right) Hill, Masson with "Soda," Thaw, Thénault, Lufbery with "Whiskey," Johnson, Bigelow and Rockwell

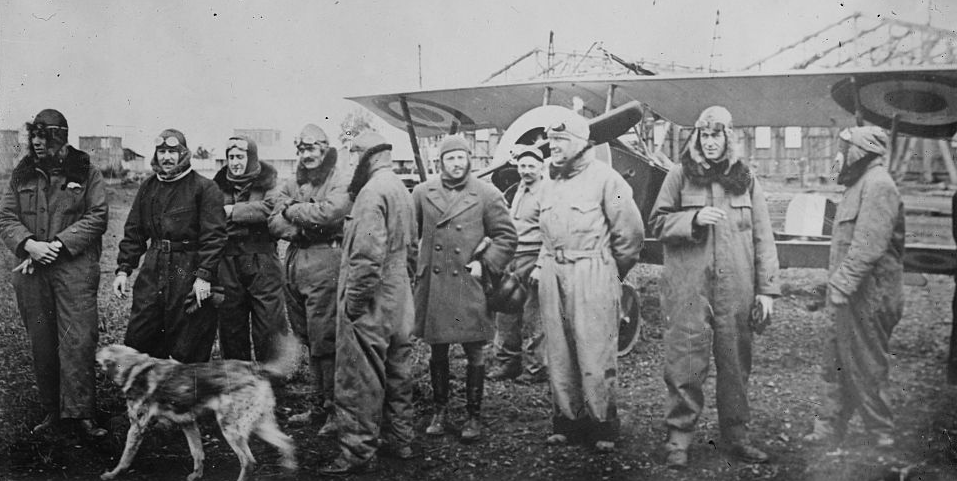
Lafayette Escadrille pilots with Fram and a Nieuport 17, March 1916. V. Chapman, E. Cowdin, Wm. Thaw, N. Prince, K. Rockwell, B. Hall, Lt. Delnage, J.K. McConnell, Capt. Thenault

James Norman Hall (1887–1951) of the Lafayette Escadrille, 1917

After the Great War, membership in the Escadrille Lafayette was claimed by over 4,000 people, "including a dozen well-known Hollywood personalities and several high government officials."

Also, from the beginning there was a great deal of confusion between American pilots who were members of the Lafayette Escadrille, a designated all-American aviation squadron of the French Service Aeronautique; and the Lafayette Flying Corps, an unofficial paper organization highlighting in its roster published during the war the names of approximately 231 American volunteer aviators who flew with more than 90 French operational escadrilles. Already existing confusion was exacerbated after a screening of the film Flyboys in 2006.

Five French officers and 38 American pilots, also known as "The Valiant 38", were members of the Lafayette Escadrille.

=== French officers ===
- Col. Philippe Fequant
- Lieut-Col. Antonin Brocard
- Capt. Georges Thenault
- Lt. Alfred de Laage de Meux
- Lt. Charles Nungesser
- Lt. Antoine Arnoux de Maison-Rouge
- Lt. Louis Verdier-Fauvety

=== American pilots ===
A dagger (†) indicates that the individual was killed in action, including those who subsequently entered the Air Service, or died of wounds received.

1. 1Lt. Stuart Emmet Edgar
2. 1Lt. Frank Luke Jr. †
3. 1Lt. Warren Tucker Hobbs †
4. Horace Clyde Balsley
5. Stephen Sohier Bigelow
6. Ray Claflin Bridgman
7. Andrew Courtney Campbell Jr. †
8. Victor Emmanuel Chapman †
9. Elliott Christopher Cowdin II
10. Charles Heave Dolan
11. James Ralph Doolittle †
12. John Armstrong Drexel
13. William Edward Dugan Jr.
14. Christopher William Ford
15. Edmond Charles Clinton Genet †
16. James Norman Hall
17. Bert Hall
18. Willis Bradley Haviland
19. Thomas Moses Hewitt Jr.
20. Dudley Lawrence Hill
21. Edward Foote Hinkle
22. Ronald Wood Hoskier †
23. Charles Chouteau Johnson
24. Henry Sweet Jones
25. Walter Lovell
26. Raoul Lufbery †
27. James Rogers McConnell †
28. Douglas MacMonagle †
29. Kenneth Archibald Marr
30. Didier Masson
31. Joseph P Murphy
32. Edwin C. "Ted" Parsons
33. Paul Pavelka †
34. David McKelvey Peterson
35. Frederick Henry Prince Jr.
36. Norman Prince †
37. Kiffin Yates Rockwell †
38. Robert Lockerbie Rockwell
39. Laurence Dana Rumsey Jr.
40. Robert Soubiran
41. William Thaw
42. Harold Buckley Willis
43. Frank E. Starrett

== Citations ==
The Group La Fayette totalized eight citations at the orders of Air Army, bearing the right to wear the fourragère with ribbon colors of the Croix de guerre 1914–1918 (France), as well as the fourragère with ribbon colors of the médaille militaire.

=== Summary ===
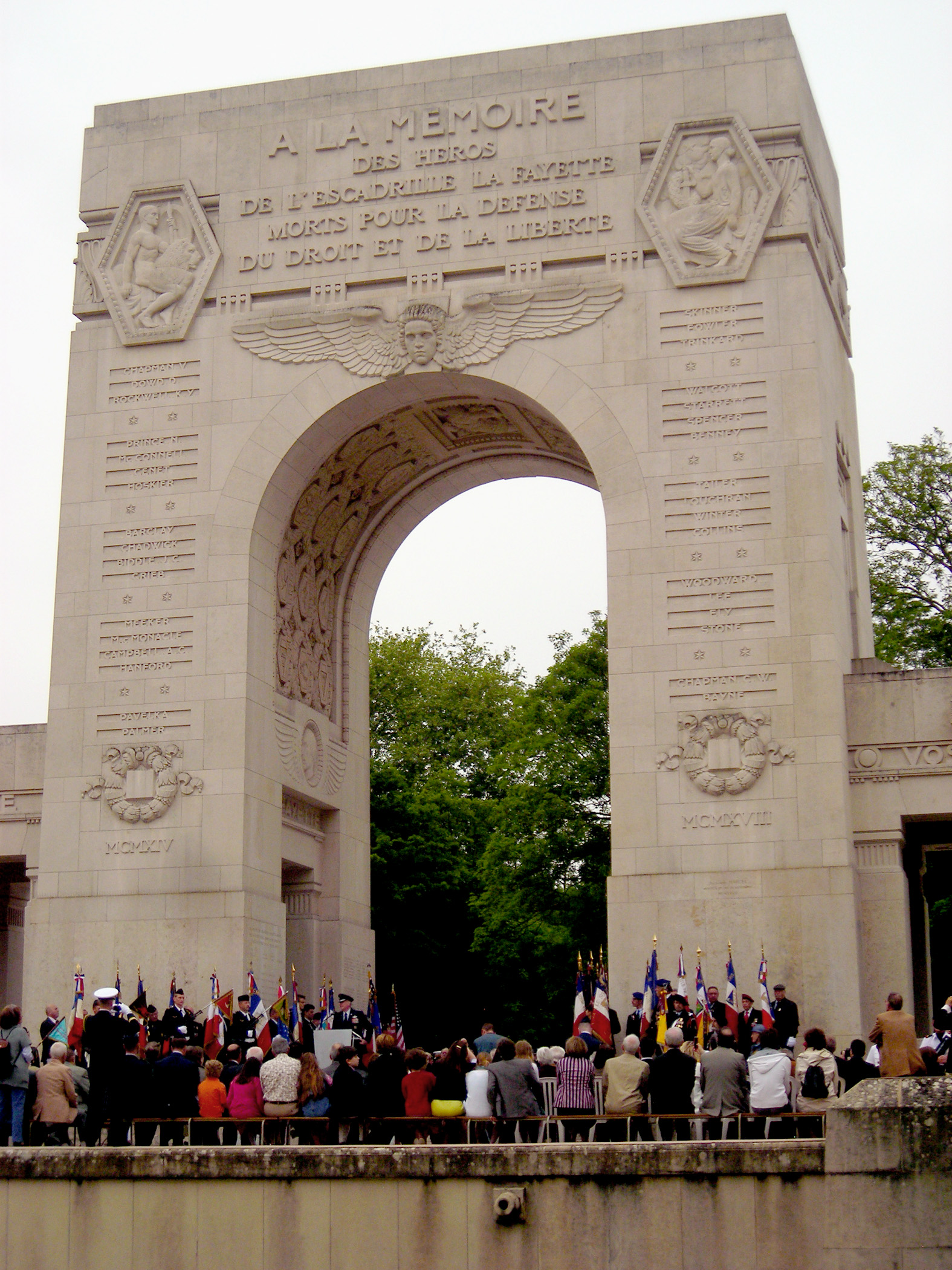
"La Fayette Escadrille" Memorial Arch was built between 1926 and 1928, and was inaugurated on July 4, 1928, U.S. Independence Day, in the notable presence of Ferdinand Foch and Paul Doumer. Inscribed in French on top in capital letters "In memory to the Heroes of Escadrille La Fayette dead for the Defense of Right and Liberty".

At the decommission of the unit on January 1, 1918, the following registry noted:

- 267 Americans volunteered in French aviation;
- 255 received their pilot brevet;
- 108 served at the front;
- 66 were killed, out of which 51 killed in action;
- 19 were wounded;
- 15 were made prisoner of war;
- 199 victories were known to be officially recognized.

== Honorary members ==
- Amelia Earhart on June 6, 1932, a couple of days after becoming the first female aviator to fly solo across the Atlantic, was made an honorary member of the Escadrille La Fayette.

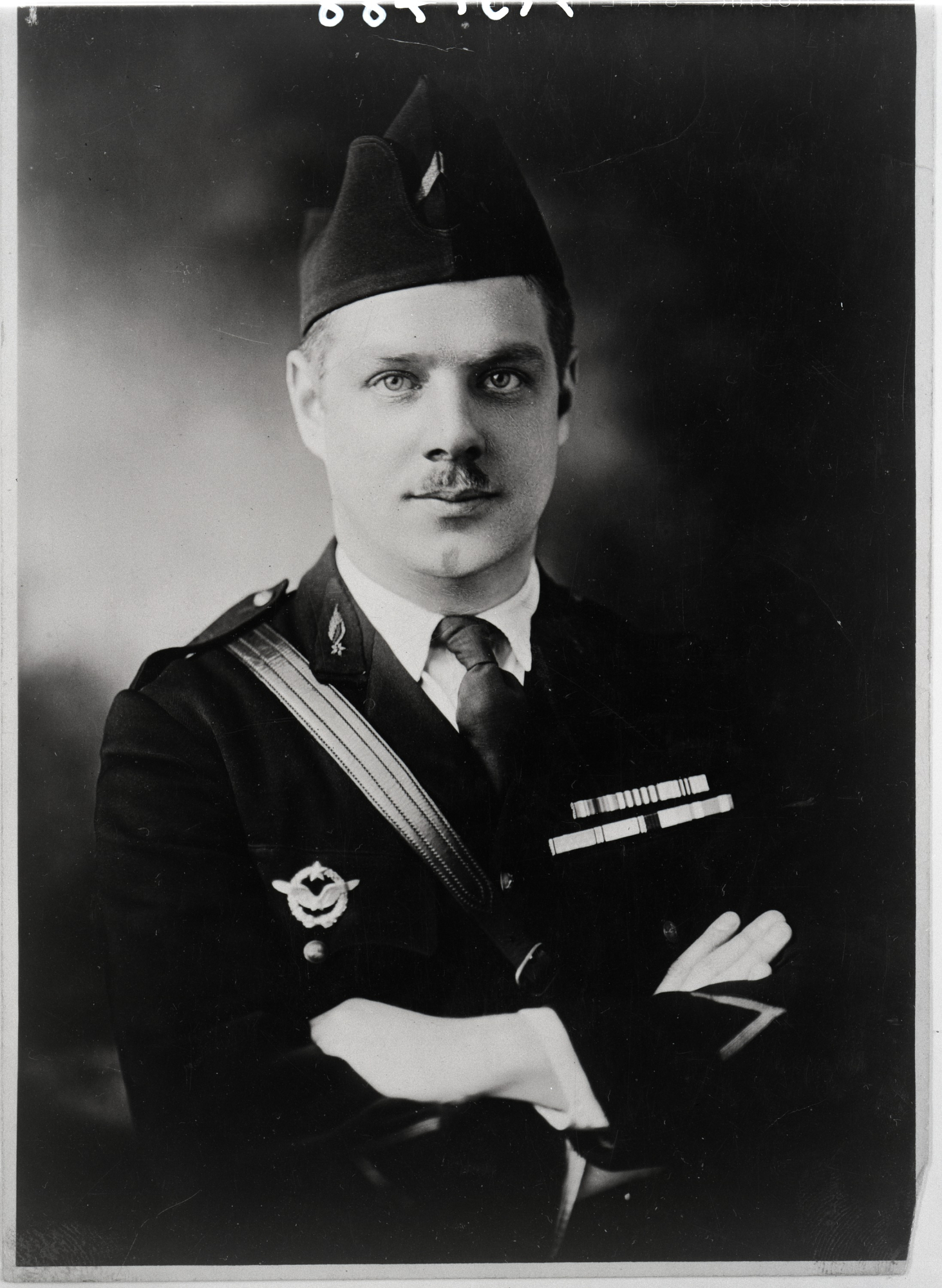
Thomas M. Hewitt Jr

== World War II ==
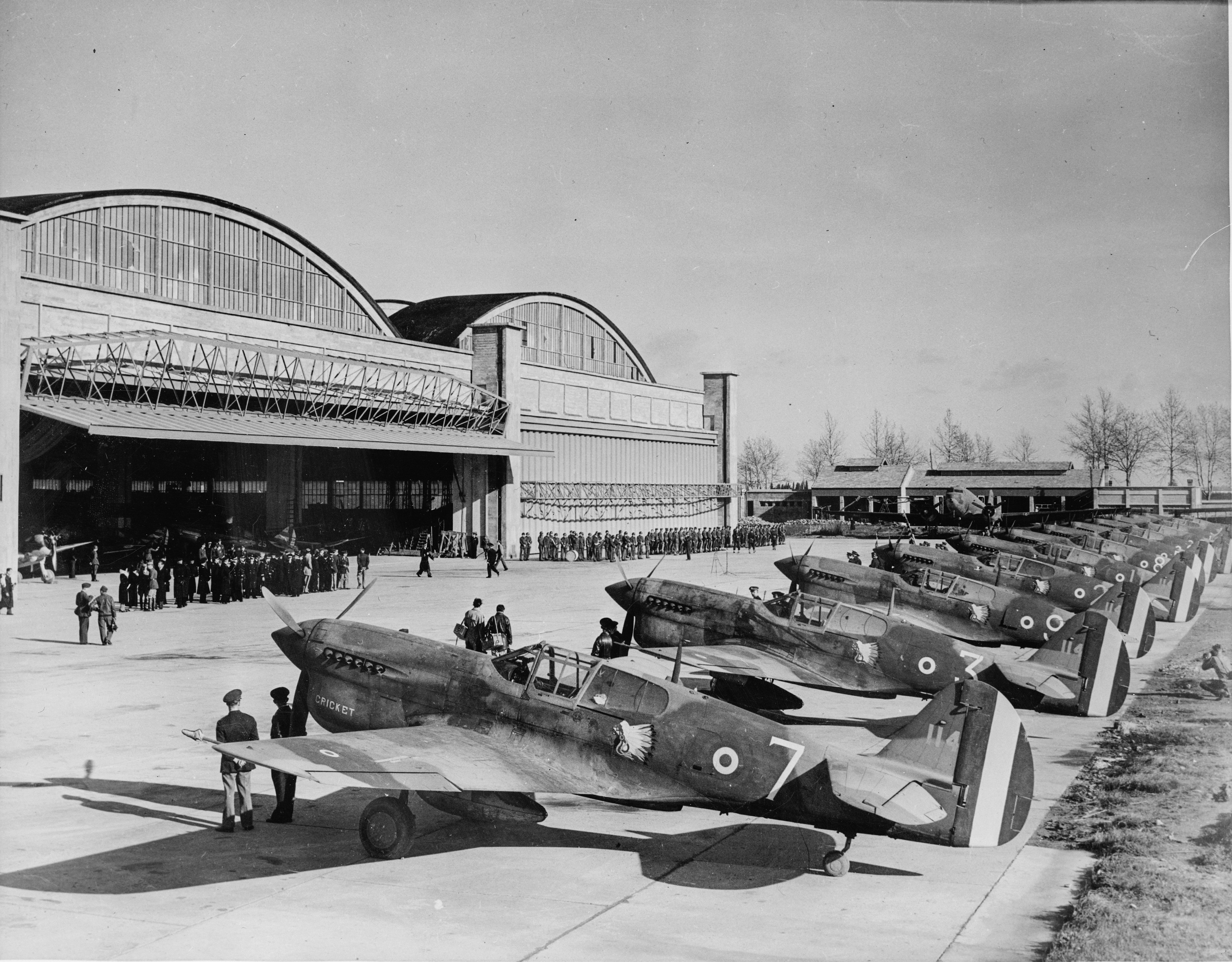
Black and white pictorial of 12 Fighters (French: Chasseurs) of the U.S.AAF aligned on an aerodrome in front of an official group. The ceremony marked the official transfer of 12 Curtiss P-40 Warhawks to the Groupe de Chasse 2/5, at Casablanca, on January 9, 1943.

The La Fayette Escadrille became the third flight unit (Escadrille) of the Groupe de Chasse 2/5 La Fayette.

Commandant of the third flight unit (escadrille)
Nom	Commandment Start	Commandment End
Captain Monraisse	September 1939	October 3, 1940
Lieutenant Villacèque	October 4, 1940	January 19, 1944
Lieutenant de Monplanet	January 20, 1944	May 8, 1945

Equipment in service in the flight unit (escadrille)
Equipment	Beginning	End
Curtiss H75	September 1939	November 1942
Curtiss H75A1	July 1940	September 1940
Dewoitine D.520	October 1942	November 1942
Curtiss P-40 Warhawk-F	November 1942	March 1943
Curtiss P-40 Warhawk-L	March 1943	March 1944
Republic P-47D Thunderbolt	May 1944	May 1945

== Lafayette Escadrille Memorial Cemetery ==
Lafayette Escadrille Memorial Cemetery, Villeneuve-l'Étang Imperial Estate, in Marnes-la-Coquette, Hauts-de-Seine, outside of Paris, is the final work of French architect Alexandre Marcel. Dedicated in 1928, the memorial commemorates the birthplace of American combat aviation, and serves as a symbol of the Franco-American comradeship during World War I. This site honors the American volunteer pilots who flew with French squadrons during the Great War, and is the final resting place for some of America's first combat aviators and their French officers. The memorial cemetery consists of an ornate central arch, half the size of the Arc de Triomphe in Paris, with a French inscription on the facade, and an English translation on the rear. The central arch is flanked by wings on either side that include open hallways terminating in end pavilions. A reflecting pool runs the length of the structure. Behind the memorial is a semi-circular terrace that forms the roof of the crypt below. Stained-glass windows in the crypt depict the major battles of the Western Front. In the memorial crypt are 68 sarcophagi, one for each of the aviators of the Lafayette Flying Corps who lost their lives during World War I. Forty-nine of these aviators are entombed in the crypt along with two of their French commanding officers. The remainder rest in other locations, or their remains were never recovered. By the early 21st century, decades of delayed maintenance to the memorial had led to structural damage, water intrusion and corrosion that required large-scale repair. Understanding its significance in the history of American military aviation, the American Battle Monuments Commission (ABMC), through an agreement with the Lafayette Escadrille Memorial Foundation and the French government that included financial support, led restoration efforts in 2015 and 2016, in time for the 100th anniversary of the formation of the squadron. In January 2017, ABMC officially assumed ownership and responsibility for the Lafayette Escadrille Memorial Cemetery, making it the 9th commemorative World War I cemetery administered by this federal agency.

== Other tributes ==
- Memorial to the American Volunteers. On 4 July 1923, the President of the French Council of State, Raymond Poincaré, dedicated a monument in the Place des États-Unis, Paris, to the Americans who had volunteered to fight in World War I in the service of France.
- A statue by the sculptor Gutzon Borglum titled Aviator (1919) was erected on the grounds of the University of Virginia in Charlottesville in the memory of James R. McConnell, who was killed during the war.
- Two other memorials are dedicated to McConnell and located in Carthage, North Carolina. The first is a granite column flanked by two cannon, the other is a granite stone inscribed in French at the community house.

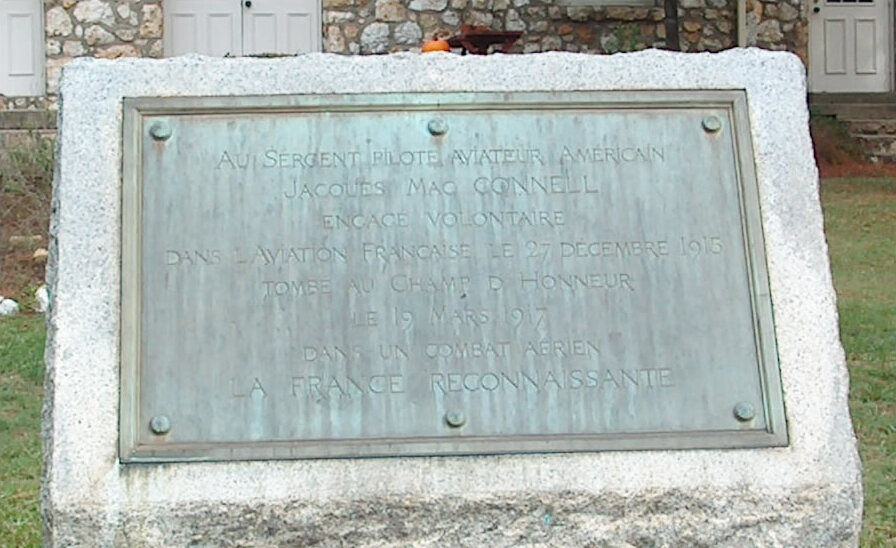
Community House Monument to James R. McConnell

- Norman Prince tomb, Washington National Cathedral, Washington, D.C.
- There is a plaque in the memory of Kiffin Yates Rockwell in Lee Chapel at Washington and Lee University in Lexington, Virginia, the college Rockwell attended before the war.
- The group was the subject of one of the "We Were There" historical books for young adults.

== Fictional accounts ==
The story of the Lafayette Escadrille has been depicted in three feature films:

- The Legion of the Condemned (1928), a William A. Wellman film;
- Lafayette Escadrille (1958), a Wellman film starring Tab Hunter, and
- Flyboys (2006), directed by Tony Bill and starring James Franco.

The Lafayette Escadrille also appears in "Attack of the Hawkmen", an episode of The Young Indiana Jones Chronicles in which Indy is temporarily assigned to the group as an aerial reconnaissance photographer.

The exploits of the Lafayette Escadrille are also captured in several works of historical fiction including: Falcons of France by Charles Nordhoff and James Norman Hall (1929) and To the Last Man by Jeffrey Shaara .

== Legacy ==
The Lafayette Escadrille is part of the 2018 short documentary Raoul Lufbery: Fighter Ace. The film subject is fighter ace Raoul Lufbery, it was directed by Alexander Zane Irwin and produced by Daniel Bernardi with the collaboration of El Dorado Films and the Veteran Documentary Corps.

== See also ==
- Moroccan Division
  - Marching Regiment of the Foreign Legion RMLE – Active in WWI and WWII
- Escadron de Chasse 2/4 La Fayette
- Escadron de Chasse 1/4 Gascogne
- Eagle Squadrons – American volunteers in the RAF during World War II
- Kościuszko Squadron – American volunteers fighting for Poland in the Polish-Soviet War (1919–1921)
- Flying Tigers – American volunteers who fought for the ROC in the Sino-Japanese War
- Patrouille de France
