= Kiffin Rockwell =

American early aviator (1892–1916)

Kiffin Yates Rockwell
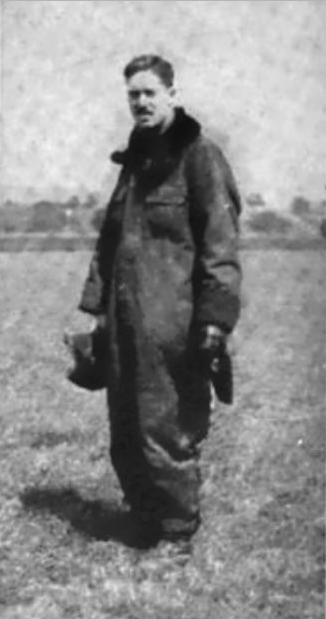
- Kiffin Rockwell in 1916
- Born: September 20, 1892; Newport, Tennessee, US
- Died: September 23, 1916 (aged 24); Roderen, France
- Burial place: Luxeuil-les-Bains Communal Cemetery, Luxeuil-les-Bains, France
- Military career
- Branch: French Air Service
- Nickname: "Aristocrat of the Air"
- Awards: Médaille militaire Croix de guerre

Kiffin Yates Rockwell (September 20, 1892 – September 23, 1916) was an early aviator and the first American pilot to shoot down an enemy aircraft in World War I. On May 18, 1916, Rockwell attacked and shot down a German plane over the Alsace battlefield. For this action he was awarded the Médaille militaire and the Croix de guerre.

== Background ==
Rockwell was born in Newport, Tennessee on September 20, 1892, the son of Baptist minister James Chester Rockwell and his wife Loula Ayres. After James Rockwell's death from typhoid fever at the age of twenty-six, the family moved several times, eventually settling in Asheville, North Carolina. Kiffin's paternal and maternal grandfathers fought in the American Civil War, and he grew up listening to stories about battles and marches. They also taught the young boy fishing, hunting and horse riding.

From 1906 to 1908, Rockwell attended the Asheville High School, and in the fall of 1908 enrolled in Virginia Military Institute. In the fall of 1909, Rockwell left for the United States Naval Academy, but after taking preliminary courses, decided to join his brother Paul at Washington and Lee University, in Lexington, Virginia, where there was a plaque in University Chapel in Kiffin Rockwell's memory.

In 1912, Rockwell took a break from his studies deciding to see the world. He traveled first to the Pacific Coast and Western Canada, and then stayed in San Francisco, California, where he opened an advertising agency, which at one time, according to his brother Paul, employed twenty people (Kiffin was nineteen at that time). In 1913, Rockwell returned to Asheville before joining Paul Rockwell in Atlanta, Georgia, finding employment with Massengale Advertising Agency.

== In the Western Front ==
At the outbreak of World War I, on August 3, 1914, Kiffin Rockwell offered his services to France by letter, which he wrote with his brother Paul, to the French Consul-General in New Orleans. James Norman Hall, the author of the "History of the Lafayette Flying Corps", suggested that Kiffin Yates Rockwell was the first American who saw military service with France after the beginning of World War I. Without waiting for a reply, the Rockwell brothers boarded SS St Paul, American Line in New York City and on August 7, 1914 departed for Europe, where they enlisted in the French Foreign Legion.

Kiffin Rockwell was shot through the leg on May 9, 1915 when his unit, the 1st Foreign Legion Regiment charged La Targette, north of Arras. He spent six weeks in the hospital and when he left for Paris on convalescent leave, his leg was completely healed. While in Paris, he spent time with his brother, Paul, who was severely wounded in the winter of 1914–15 in the shoulder, earlier than Kiffin, and became unfit for active service. After recuperating, Paul was transferred to the Allied Press Mission of French Army Grand Headquarters and worked as a war correspondent with the Chicago Daily News. In his turn, Kiffin requested transfer from the trenches to France's air arm and was among the first Americans to be added to the infant fighter/pursuit squadron which would come to be known as the Lafayette Escadrille. The Escadrille Américaine (Escadrille N.124) was authorized by the French Air Department on March 21, 1916. Paul Rockwell became a publicist for the fledgling Lafayette Escadrille.

On May 18, 1916, Rockwell, flying a Nieuport, attacked and shot down a German aircraft, a two-man observation plane, over the Alsace battlefield despite having troubles with the motor. Thus, he became the first American pilot to shoot down an enemy plane during World War I. For this action he was awarded the Médaille militaire and the Croix de guerre. On May 26, 1916, during the defense of Verdun, Rockwell was wounded in the face during combat with an enemy airplane, however refused to stay in the hospital.

=== Death ===
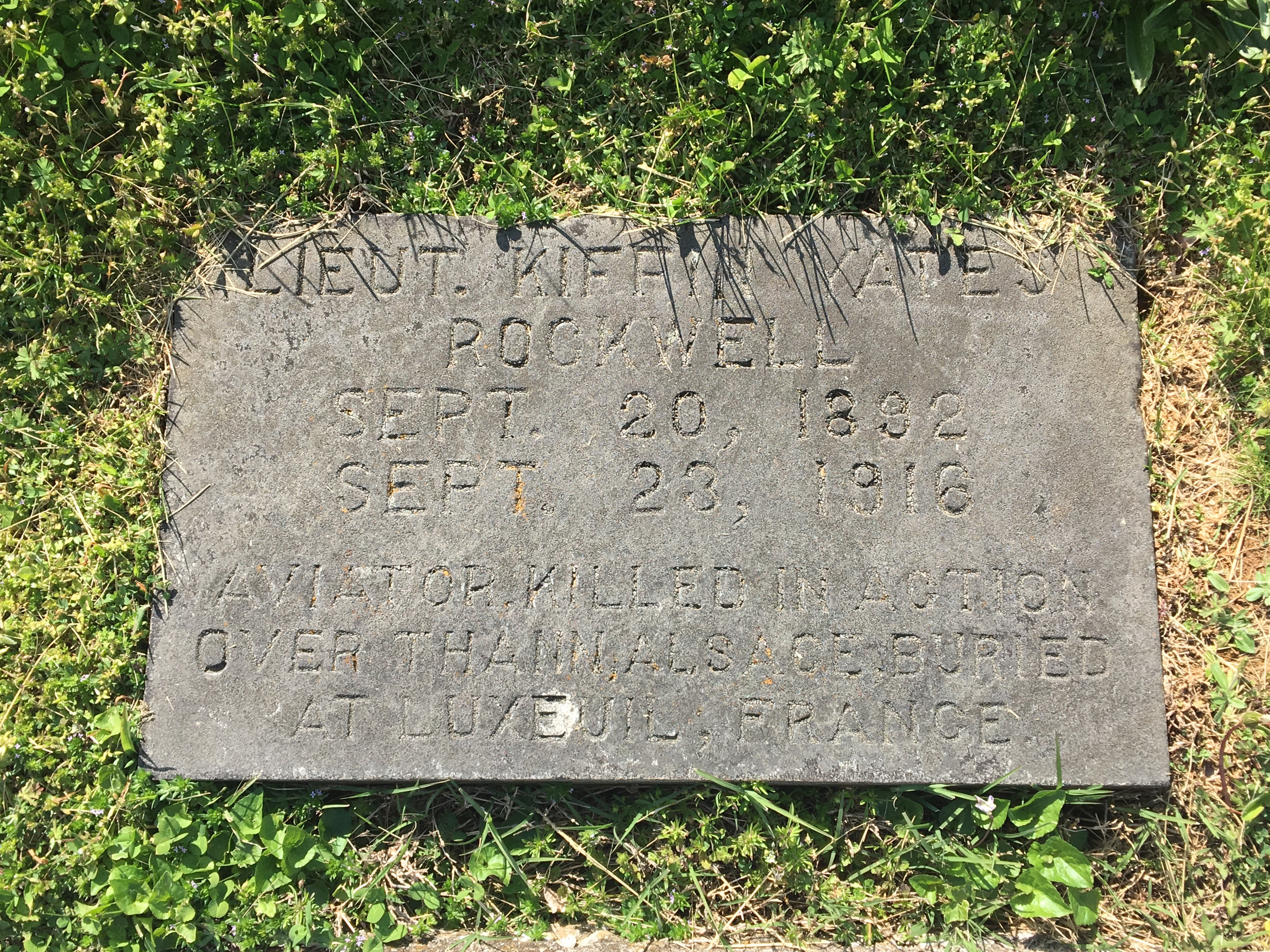
Rockwell’s honorary gravestone in Morristown, Tennessee. He is actually buried in France.

On September 23, 1916, during a fight with a German two-man reconnaissance plane, Rockwell was shot through the chest by an explosive bullet and killed instantly. His plane crashed between the first and second line of French trenches. Rockwell became the second American airman to die in combat in France, and was buried with military honors.

Rockwell is buried in Luxeuil-les-Bains Communal Cemetery in Luxeuil-les-Bains, France. He also has a gravestone at Emma Jarnagin Cemetery in Morristown, Tennessee where his family is buried.

Rockwell is quoted in a 1917 French children's book Nos alliés les Américains (Our Allies, the Americans) Number 207 in the Les Livres Roses pour les Jeunesse, written by Henriette Perrin-Duportal. His statement "La cause de la France est la cause tout de l'humanite" is accompanied by a description of him as an American volunteer who died for France.

== See also ==
- Stephen W. Thompson, the first member of the United States military (1st Aero Squadron) to shoot down an enemy aircraft.
