= Elliott C. Cowdin =

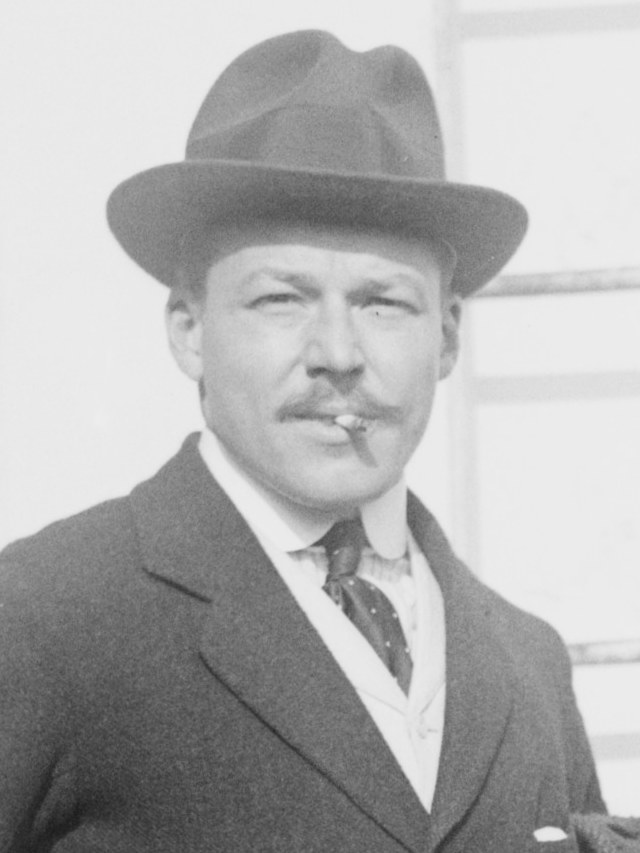
Cowdin in 1915

Elliott Christopher Cowdin (March 3, 1886 - January 6, 1933) was a member of the Lafayette Escadrille who downed three German planes.

He was born in Queens, New York City to John Elliot Cowdin and Gertrude Cheever. He died on January 6, 1933, in Palm Beach, Florida.
