= Harold Buckley Willis =

American soldier

- Harold Willis, Lafayette Escadrille, 1917
- Born: February 9, 1890; Boston, Massachusetts
- Died: April 18, 1962 (aged 72)
- Military career
- Allegiance: United States
- Branch: American Ambulance Hospital Field Service; Aéronautique Militaire (France); United States Army Air Service
- Service years: American Ambulance (1915); French Air Service (June 1915-1919)
- Rank: Sous Lieutenant (French), World War I Colonel (U.S.), World War II
- Unit: Aéronautique Militaire: Escadrille N.124 (Lafayette Escadrille) (1 March-18 August 1917)
- Conflicts: World War I World War II
- Awards: Croix de guerre with Star (Ambulance); Croix de guerre with Palm (Aviation); Médaille Militaire

Harold Buckley Willis FAIA (February 9, 1890 – April 18, 1962) was an American architect and pilot. He was a member of the Lafayette Escadrille during World War I and designed the insignia for the squadron. He spent nearly his entire professional career as a partner in the Boston architectural firm of Allen & Collens and its successors.

== Early life ==
Born February 9, 1890, in Boston, Massachusetts to John B. and Myrta (Gale) Willis. Harold attended Newton High School and graduated from Harvard College Class of 1912.

== World War I ==
He enlisted in the American Ambulance Field Service in February 1915, and arrived at the western front, with Section 2, at Pont-a-Mousson, in April 1915. From February to May he served with the Ambulance at Verdun. He was cited July 4, 1915, "for rescue of wounded under fire," offensive Bois-le-Pretre, "Croix de Guerre with Star."

In June 1915, he enlisted in the Foreign Legion of the French Army, and transferred to 2d Groupe d'Aviation. He was brevetted pilot on Bleriot at Buc. He trained successively at Nieuport Perfectionnement School, at Avord; Machine-Gun School, Cazaux; Combat and Acrobatics, at Pau; Spad, at Plessis Belleville.

Willis arrived on the Somme front with the Lafayette Escadrille (N 124) in March, 1917. Soon after arriving Willis redesigned the squadron insignia changing it from a Seminole warrior to a Sioux warrior. The original indian head was printed on boxes of ammunition marked "Savage Arms Manufacturing Company". This company was providing ammunition for machine guns used by reconnaissance units and bombers of the French military aviation.

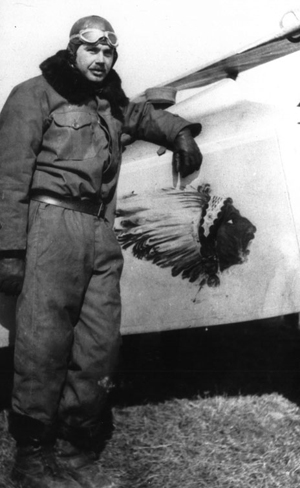
Harold Buckley Willis shown with the original insignia of the Lafayette Escadrille (N 124) in France during World War I about March 1917.

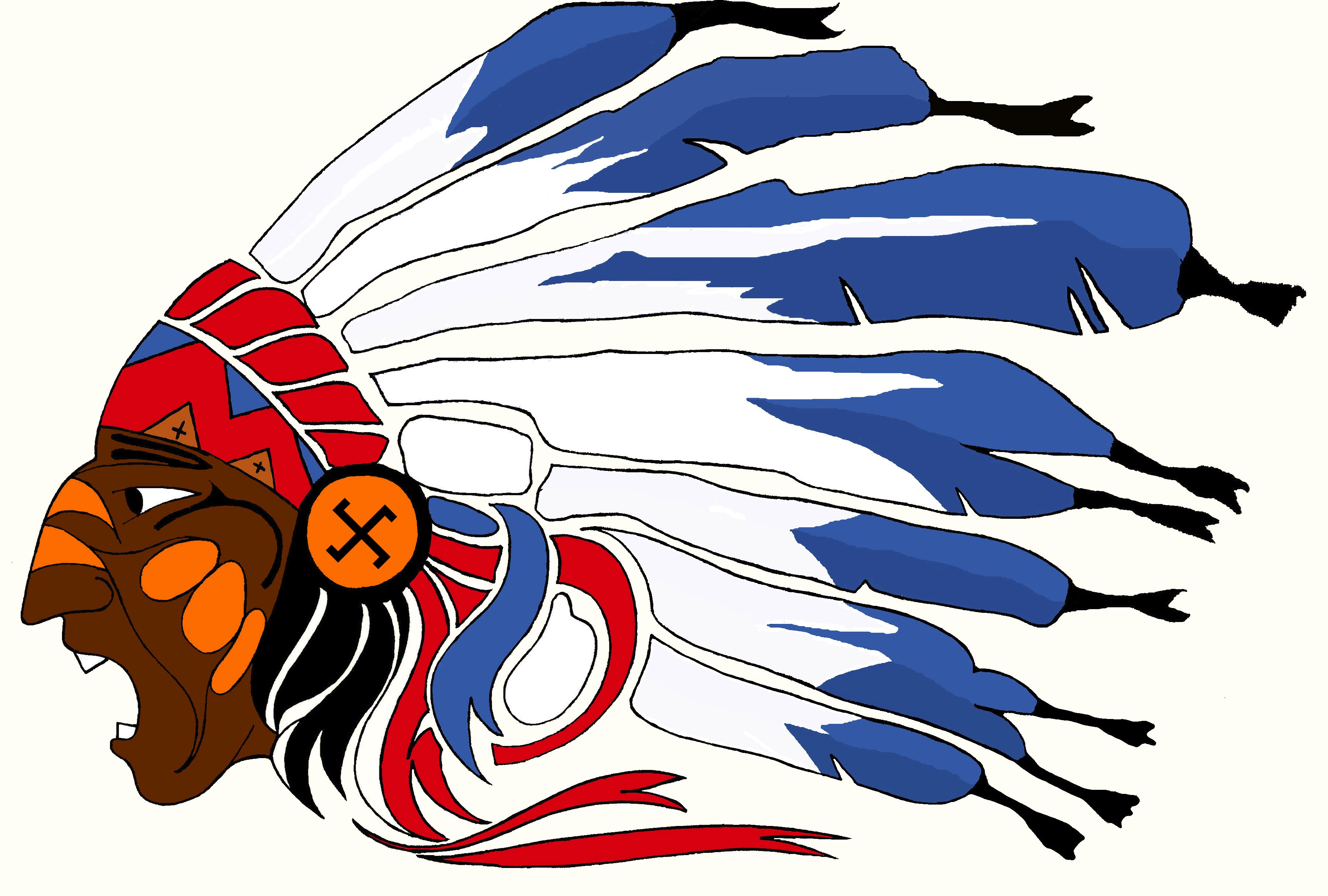
Second insignia created by Harold Willis for the Lafayette Escadrille

Sgt. Willis, was captured after an aerial battle, probably against Lt. Wilhelm Schulz of Jasta 16b, 18 August 1917. The aircraft was hit numerous times with damage to the engine which forced the pilot to land in German territory near Convensoye, France.

He wrote of his capture in a letter written from a Westphalian prison camp:

This is the first chance I have had to write you a long letter I have heard nothing from the outside yet, but am hopeful. Hope is all that keeps us going. I will tell you how I happened to be the first in the Escadrille to be taken alive — a dubious distinction. We were protecting a group of bombing planes on a daylight raid some distance in enemy territory. Suddenly we were attacked by a rather energetic patrol of monoplaces, and a general mix up ensued. One of our planes in front of me was attacked and I was able to 'crock' the German — short lived satisfaction. The monoplace was protected by two others which in turn attacked me from behind riddling my machine To continue in a straight line was fatal So I did a renversement and attacked — my only defense.

Immediately, of course, I was separated from our group, which continued. It would not have been so bad had my motor not been touched at the first volley. It worked only intermittently causing loss of height. We had a wild fight almost to the ground. I did all sorts of stunts to avoid fire on the line of flight. The enemy flew well. We missed collision twice by inches. I was badly raked by cross fire; music of bullets striking motor and cables. Toward the end my wind-shield was shattered and my goggles broken by a ball which slightly stunned me. I had an awful feeling of despair at the thought of the inevitable landing in Germany. As I neared the ground I had an instant's desire to dive into it — saw a wood in front of me, jumped it and landed instinctively on the crest of a hill. One of the Germans flew over me waved his hand turned and landed followed by his two comrades.

All saluted very politely as they came up — young chaps perfectly correct. My machine was a wreck thirty bullets in the fuselage motor and radiator exactly half of the cables cut tires punctured and wings riddled. It was a beautiful machine and had always served me well. Too bad!

The aviators took me to lunch at their quarters where I awaited a motor which took me to a prison in a fortress. One always expects to be either killed or wounded — never taken. So I had left the ground in two sweaters no coat and with no money. Confess I cried like a baby when I was finally alone in my cell. The first three days were terrible. One is not glad to be alive, especially when one wakes, forgets for a moment where one is, and then remembers. Pleasantest are the nights, for one always has vivid dreams of home or the Front You can understand how wearing it is, to be helpless — a sort of living corpse — when there is need of every one. I try not to think of it.

Willis was interned in the prison camps of Montmedy, Karlsruhe, Landshut, Giitersloh, reprisal camp Eutin, Bad Stuer, Mecklenburg-Schwerin, Magdeburg, Wurzburg, and Villingen, during 14 months of captivity. After several attempts, Willis disguised as a German guard, made his escape from the American camp at Villingen on Oct. 4, 1918, crossing the Rhine river into Switzerland and finally back to Paris.

On arriving at Paris, Willis was awarded the Médaille Militaire and permitted to return to the Argonne front. Returning to the US in 1919, he was honorably discharged.

He wrote his memoirs in a six-part series that appeared in The Boston Globe within a week of his arrival home. The series was issued as the book Through a Cloud of Bullets in January 2019.

== Architectural career ==
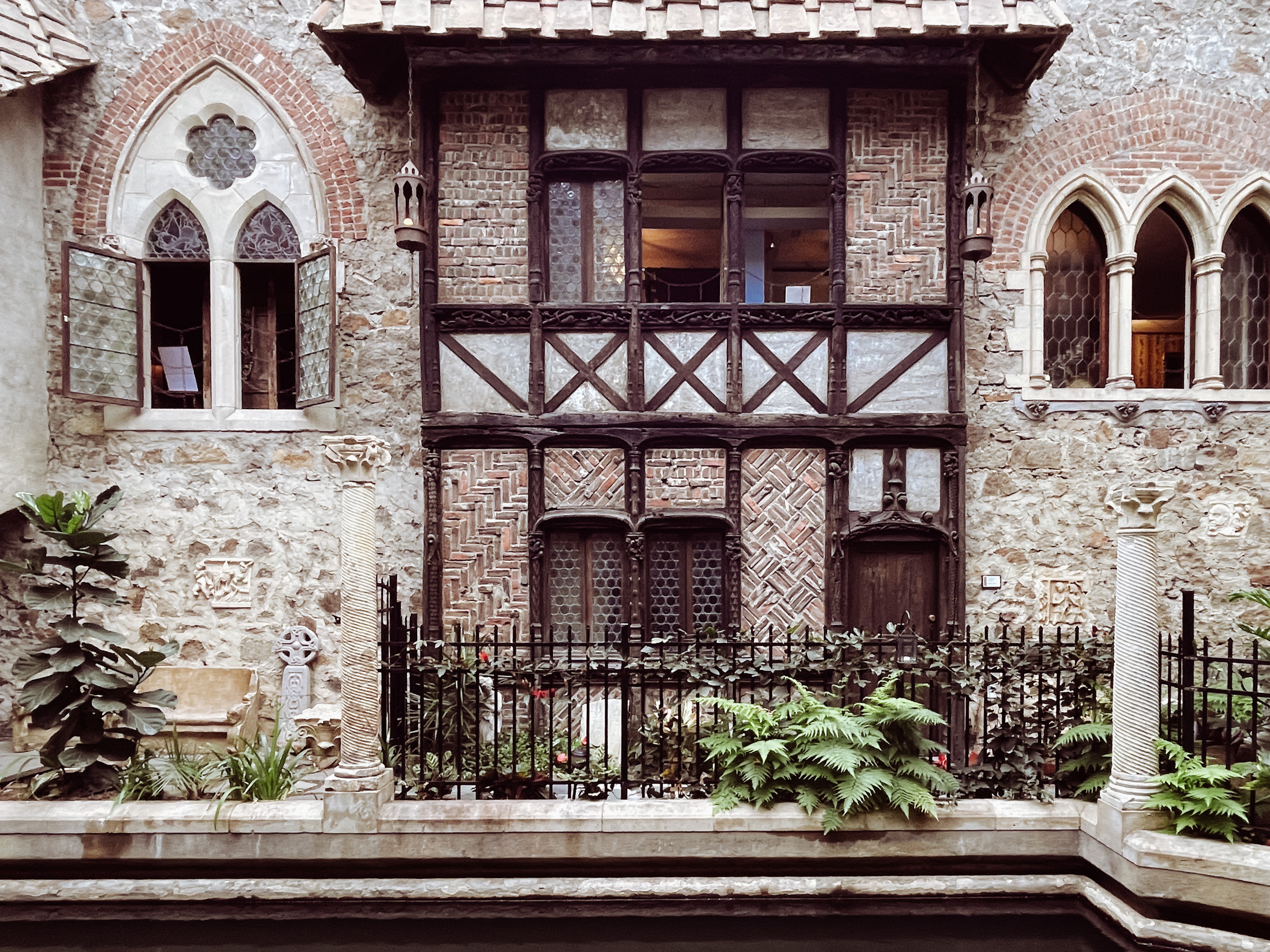
Part of the courtyard of Hammond Castle in Gloucester, designed by Willis for John Hays Hammond Jr. and completed in 1929.

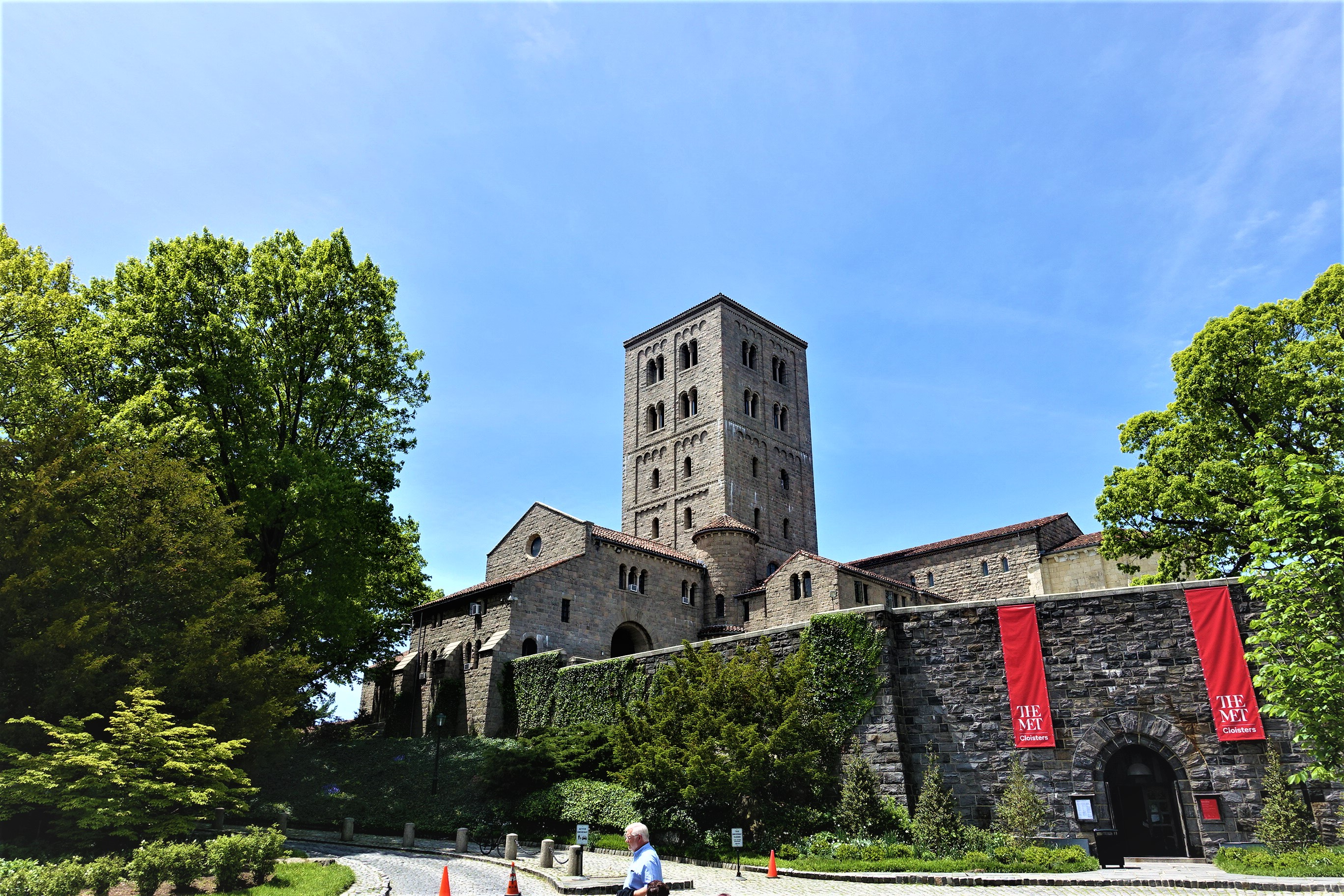
The Cloisters in New York City, designed by Collens and Willis and completed in 1938, also included extensive architectural salvage.

Willis was an architect by profession. From his Harvard graduation until 1915 Willis worked for Monks & Johnson, Boston architects and engineers. In 1920, after his return to Boston, he joined the office of Allen & Collens, where he would remain for the rest of his career. Allen & Collens worked in the Beaux-Arts tradition and were best known for their Gothic Revival work. During his early years with the firm, Willis was chief designer of many of their residential works, most notably the Gloucester, Massachusetts, homes of actor Leslie Buswell and inventor John Hays Hammond Jr., both begun in 1923. He had served alongside Buswell in the Ambulance Field Service, and Hammond was a close friend and probable lover of Buswell. Both houses incorporated extensive architectural salvage: old English and Colonial American for Buswell, and French, Italian and Spanish for Hammond. Hammond's home, known as Hammond Castle, is open to the public.

Willis became a partner in the firm in 1924. From 1925 he was the second most senior partner after Charles Collens. The firm was afterward renamed three times: Allen, Collens & Willis in 1934, Collens, Willis & Hubbard in 1940 and Collens, Willis & Beckonert in 1945. Some works in which he had a major role include:

- 1929 – Trinity United Methodist Church, 361 Sumner Ave, Springfield, Massachusetts
- 1930 – Riverside Church, 490 Riverside Dr, New York City
- 1932 – Newton City Hall and War Memorial, 1000 Commonwealth Ave, Newton Centre, Massachusetts
- 1936 - Swedish Congregational Church, 455 Arborway, Jamaica Plain, Massachusetts
- 1938 – The Cloisters, 99 Margaret Corbin Dr, New York City
- 1939 – First Baptist Church, 111 Park Ave, Worcester, Massachusetts
- 1950 – Weston High School, 16 Alphabet Ln, Weston, Massachusetts
  - Later the Field Elementary School, demolished in 2015.
- 1958 – Downes Memorial Clock Tower, Trinity College, Hartford, Connecticut

Collens, Willis and John D. Rockefeller Jr. revisited Hammond Castle during the planning of The Cloisters in New York City, which incorporated architectural salvage on a larger scale. Collens died in 1956, and Willis was senior partner of the firm until his death in 1962.

Willis was a member of the American Institute of Architects (AIA). He served in leadership roles in his local chapter, the Boston Society of Architects, and on national committees. He was elected a Fellow of the AIA in 1950 in recognition of his public service and for his service to the AIA.

== World War II ==
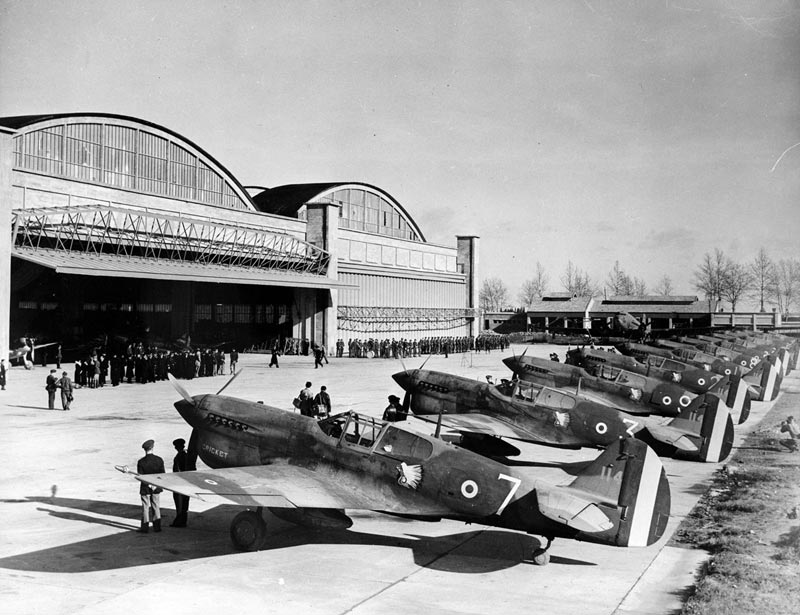
12 Curtiss P-40 Warhawks to the Free French Fighter Group GC II/5

During World War II, Willis served in the U.S. Army Air Force as a major in Africa, England and France. He left the Air Force after the war as a colonel.

Willis was successful in convincing the U.S. government to transfer 12 Curtiss P-40 Warhawks to the Free French Fighter Group GC II/5 based in North Africa. These aircraft were painted with the Lafayette Escadrille insignia emblazoned on their fuselages.
