= Douglas Gilfillan =

Douglas Flemmer Gilfillan (1865–1948) was a South African lawyer and plant collector.

== Biography ==
Gilfillan went to school in Cradock, Eastern Cape, where his father Edward practised as a solicitor. After serving as an articled clerk in the Cape Town law firm of Reid & Nephew, he was admitted as a solicitor and notary to the Supreme Court of the Cape Colony. He moved to Barberton in 1888 and carried on a legal practise there until 1893. During that time he joined the Barberton Scientific and Literary Society and met the plant collector Ernest Edward Galpin: this meeting initiated a life-long friendship between the two. Gilfillan married Sophia Maria Magdalena de Jong, and Galpin married her sister, Marie Elizabeth.

In 1893 Gilfillan moved to Johannesburg and founded a law firm now known as Bowman Gilfillan. During the early part of his time in Johannseburg, which was then part of the Transvaal Republic he became a member of the Reform Committee, an organisation of Uitlanders who were looking for an increased political role for immigrants. Gilfillan was jailed with many others following the Jameson Raid. The Reform Committee members were tried and sentenced to death. This sentence was later reduced to a fine of £2000. Sir Abe Bailey paid Gilfillan's fine and he was released and continued his legal practice. Gilfillan served as a captain in the Imperial Light Horse regiment in the Boer War. When the Boer War ended Gilfillan was appointed a member of the special criminal court for Johannesburg and acting magistrate for Boksburg and Germiston.

Gilfillan collected over 500 botanical specimens. These were collected in the areas around Johannesburg (1898- 1899), Middelburg, Eastern Cape (1899), Heidelberg, Gauteng and Witbank (1905). Gilfillan sent his specimens to Galpin, who incorporated them in his herbarium under Gilfillan's name. Galpin's herbarium later formed the nucleus of the government herbarium in Pretoria.

== Commemoration ==
The following plant species were named in his honour: Canthium gilfillanii, Zygophyllum gilfillanii, Europs gilfillanii.

== Notes and references ==
- Gibson, George Fleming (1937). The story of the Imperial Light Horse in the South African War, 1899-1902. G.D. & Co.
- Gunn, Mary; Codd, L. E. W. (1981). Botanical Exploration Southern Africa. CRC Press. ISBN 978-0-86961-129-6.
- Glen, Hugh F. (2004). Sappi What's in a Name: The Meanings of the Botanical Names of Trees. Jacana Media. ISBN 978-1-77009-040-8.
