= Frank Rhodes (British Army officer) =

British soldier and colonial governor (1850–1905)

Colonel Frank Rhodes CB DSO
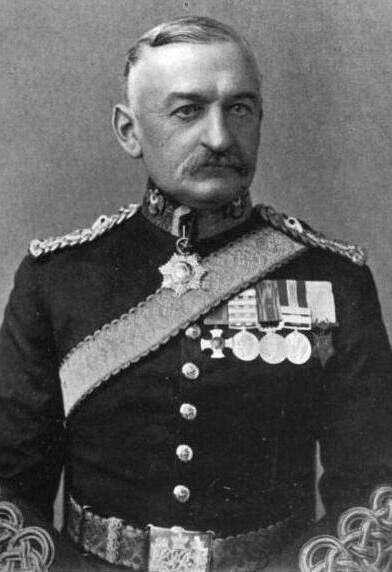
- Born: Francis William Rhodes; 9 April 1850; Saint Michaels, Bishop's Stortford, Hertfordshire, England
- Died: 21 September 1905 (aged 55); Groot Schuur, Cape Colony
- Burial place: Matobo National Park, Zimbabwe
- Relatives: Cecil Rhodes (brother)
- Military career
- Allegiance: United Kingdom
- Branch: British Army
- Service years: 1873–1896; 1899–1903
- Rank: Colonel
- Nickname: Frank
- Unit: 1st Royal Dragoons
- Conflicts: Sudan Campaign: Battles of El Teb Battle of Khartoum Battle of Tamai Battle of Abu Klea Battle of Omdurman; Second Matabele War; Second Boer War: Siege of Ladysmith Relief of Mafeking
- Awards: Distinguished Service Order; Khedive's Star; British South Africa Company Medal; Order of the Bath; Order of the Medjidie
- Other work: Administrator of Mashonaland; Reform Committee (Transvaal); War correspondent

Colonel Francis William Rhodes CB DSO (9 April 1850 – 21 September 1905) was a British military officer. He is perhaps the best known member of the Rhodes family after his mining magnate brother Cecil.

== Biography ==
Trained as a soldier from his youth, he participated in a considerable amount of conflict in different parts of the world. After graduating from the Royal Military College, Sandhurst, he joined the 1st Royal Dragoons as a sub-lieutenant in 1873 and served the British Army for 23 years. In 1875 he was promoted to lieutenant and in 1884 to captain. As aide-de-camp to Sir Herbert Stewart, he participated in the Sudan Campaign, accompanied the Nile Expedition to Khartoum in the abortive effort to relieve General Charles George Gordon, and was present at the battles of El Teb and Tamai. At the Battle of Abu Klea, he distinguished himself when he had several horses shot from under him in the course of the engagement. In September 1885 he was promoted to major and in December he was granted the brevet rank of lieutenant-colonel for his service in the Sudan. He was awarded several medals and clasps, including the Distinguished Service Order in 1891.

Rhodes was seconded from the 1st Dragoons for service on the staff in 1886 and was promoted to colonel in 1889. He served as military secretary to the Governor of Bombay Lord Harris from 1890 to 1893, and in 1893 he was chief of staff on Sir Gerald Herbert Portal's mission to Uganda. Rhodes also served for a brief period as Administrator of Mashonaland and as the appointed military member of the council of four in the government of Matabeleland under Leander Starr Jameson. He was placed on the half-pay list in 1894.

The Jameson Raid was perhaps the most trying event in Rhodes's career. He was a leading member of the Reform Committee in Johannesburg, attempting to liberalise the government of Transvaal Republic President Paul Kruger on behalf of the Uitlander population living in Transvaal. Following the Jameson Raid in December 1895, the members of the Reform Committee were charged with high treason. Rhodes, John Hays Hammond, Douglas Gilfillan and other leaders of the committee were sentenced to death in April 1896. This was later commuted to 15 years' imprisonment, and in June 1896, all members of the committee were released on payment of a heavy fine. As a punishment for his support of Jameson the British Army placed Rhodes on the retired list and barred him from active involvement in army business. After his release from jail, he immediately joined his brother Cecil and the British South Africa Company in the Second Matabele War.

In 1898 he joined Sir Herbert Kitchener's Nile expedition as war correspondent for The Times. At the Battle of Omdurman on 2 September he was shot and severely wounded in the right arm. For his services during that campaign he was restored to the army active list. During the Second Boer War, Rhodes continued to work as a war correspondent. He was trapped for the duration in the Siege of Ladysmith and participated in the relief of Mafeking. He was mentioned in despatches by Lord Roberts and made a Companion of the Order of the Bath.

With the death of his brother Cecil in 1902, Frank took possession of Dalham Hall, and erected a hall in the village in Cecil's memory. After retiring from the Army in 1903, he served as managing director of the African Trans-Continental Telegraph Company until his death in 1905 in Groote Schuur, Cape Colony.

Political offices
| New title | Administrator of Mashonaland; 1893 | Succeeded by Patrick William Forbes |
