= Albert Riemenschneider =

(Charles) Albert Riemenschneider (August 31, 1878 – July 20, 1950) was an American musician and Bach musicologist.

Riemenschneider was born into a musical family. His father, Karl H. Riemenschneider, was the president of German Wallace College in Berea, Ohio (which later became Baldwin Wallace University). While still a student at the college, he was offered the then-vacant position of director of the music department in 1898, a post he held until his retirement 50 years later. This department then became under his directorship the Baldwin-Wallace Conservatory of Music. In 1899, he graduated from the college and received its Alumni Merit Award; his wife Selma, née Marting, graduated in 1904, also with an Alumni Merit Award. In 1989 the Riemenschneider family, many of whom graduated from BW, received the college's inaugural Family Heritage Award.

In 1932, Albert Riemenschneider and his wife founded the Baldwin-Wallace Bach Festival, the oldest collegiate Bach festival in America. It was modelled on the Bethlehem Bach Festival, which was developed by Riemenschneider's friend, Dr. Frederick Wolle.

From 1902 to 1903, he studied piano under Hugo Reinhold and composition under Robert Fuchs in Vienna. In Paris in 1904 and 1905, he studied with Charles-Marie Widor and Alexandre Guilmant and became a friend of Marcel Dupré and Albert Schweitzer. The American organist Richard Ellsasser (1926–1972) was his pupil. Riemenschneider performed Bach's music in more than three hundred recitals and concerts in America and Europe. He received an honorary doctorate "D.mus." in 1944 (Grove: 1939) from the Sherwood Conservatory of Music and served as president on several educational and Methodist institutions. In 1947 he retired as director of the conservatorium, but returned later to serve as Acting President for one year. He was invited by the Library of Congress to hold a lecture on Bach in 1950, but it had to be presented posthumously.

The most enduring publication of his scholarly works was his Bach — 371 Harmonized Chorales and 69 Chorale Melodies with Figured Bass, ed. Albert Riemenschneider, G. Schirmer, NY, 1941 (see also List of chorale harmonisations by Johann Sebastian Bach).

Selma Riemenschneider continued the management of the Bach festival until 1954. In 1951 she donated Albert's collection of rare Bach manuscripts to Baldwin-Wallace College, founding a library which in 1969 became the Riemenschneider Bach Institute.

Albert and Selma Riemenschneider had three children, Edwin, Paul, and Wilma. Albert died on July 20 1950 in Akron, Ohio, just a few days away from the 200th anniversary of Bach's death.
