= Drifts Crisis =

Imperial-republican confrontation in South Africa in 1895

The Drifts Crisis of 1895 was an imperial-republican confrontation in South Africa that took place in September and October 1895. It was precipitated by the closing of fords, which in South Africa were known as 'drifts'. The Crisis has traditionally been seen as the precursor to the Jameson Raid and the uncompromising policies of High Commissioner for Southern Africa Alfred Milner which followed, and eventually led to the Second Anglo-Boer War (9 October 1899 – 31 May 1902). Historians generally regard the conflicts to have been between the Cape Colony and the South African Republic (SAR), informally known as the Transvaal Republic.

== Escalation ==
In late 19th century South Africa, the landlocked Transvaal was forced to rely on British colonial railways and ports. Therefore, Transvaal awarded the construction of a railway to the Netherlands-South African Railway Company (NZASM); however by mid-1891, the NZASM was on the verge of bankruptcy. When a European bond flotation became impossible, Cape Colony Prime Minister Cecil Rhodes offered a loan to Transvaal President Paul Kruger in exchange for building the Cape Line.

Once the Cape Colony had finished building a railway line to Johannesburg, it attempted to get as much of the railway traffic of the Transvaal as possible by reducing its rates, as it was aware that the Delagoa Bay line at the Transvaal was almost complete. The Transvaal government increased the rates on the part of the railway that ran through the Transvaal, once it had crossed the Vaal River. In answer to this, goods were taken to the Vaal River by train and then taken further by wagon to avoid paying the higher prices in the Transvaal. Kruger reacted by blocking access to the Transvaal, closing the drifts on the Transvaal side.

== The Drifts Crisis ==
The Cape Colony attempted to get around this by unloading goods at the border and hauling them by wagon the 50 miles (80 km) or so to Johannesburg. There was no road bridge over the Vaal River, which constituted the border; wagons had to make their way across by crossing fords, which in South Africa were known as 'drifts'. The SAR responded by closing the drifts to all goods traffic. There was a great deal of anger toward this protectionism and exclusion, not only in the Cape Colony but also in the Orange Free State and among Afrikaners. The Afrikaner Bond supported the strong stand by the Rhodes government, urging action, even war, if the drifts were not reopened. Eventually, the SAR did relent, and the crisis passed. However, there were lingering clashes of interests. Afrikaners outside the SAR wanted access to the markets of the Rand and to share in the wealth being generated by the gold mining; the SAR government wanted to preserve markets for its own farmers, build up manufacturing to help employ its landless white burghers, and make itself as free as possible from influence by the British.

== Jameson Raid ==
The British government demanded that Kruger open the drifts and used the situation to involve itself directly in Transvaal affairs. Infuriated, Rhodes planned an uprising of Uitlanders in Johannesburg. The uprising was timed to coincide with an invasion of the Transvaal from Bechuanaland (present-day Botswana), led by Dr Leander Starr Jameson. Rhodes wanted to take over the government of the Transvaal and turn it into a British colony that would join all the other colonies in a federation.

The Jameson Raid, which began on 29 December 1895, was a total failure. Jameson's force was tracked from the moment that it crossed the border and first encountered resistance very early on 1 January when there was a very brief exchange of fire with a Boer outpost. Jameson eventually surrendered to Commandant Piet Cronjé, and the raiders were taken to a Pretoria jail.

== Aftermath ==
Rhodes was forced to resign as the prime minister of the Cape Colony, and the political problems between Afrikaans- and English-speaking colonists became worse than ever. The Orange Free State co-operated more closely with the Transvaal. Transvaal residents felt that they were being threatened and the Uitlanders were treated with more suspicion than ever before. Eventually this growing resentment accentuated itself into the Second Boer War.
