= Richard Hammond (disambiguation) =

Richard Hammond is a British presenter, writer and journalist best known for presenting Top Gear.

Richard Hammond may also refer to:

- Richard Pindle Hammond (1896–1980), American composer
- Richard P. Hammond (politician) (Richard Pindell Hammond), Speaker of the California State Assembly from January–May 1852
- Richard Hammond Jr American Author

== See also ==
- Richard Hamming (1915–1998), American mathematician
