= Hammond Museum and Japanese Stroll Garden =

Hammond Museum & Japanese Stroll Garden
- Location within New York
- Established: 1957
- Location: 28 Deveau Road; North Salem, New York
- Coordinates: 41.332°N 73.582°W
- Type: Art museum
- Parking: Onsite
- Website: www.hammondmuseum.org

The Hammond Museum and Japanese Stroll Garden, in North Salem, New York, is a museum with Japanese art and a 3.5-acre (1.4 ha) Japanese stroll garden in Westchester County. The museum offers changing exhibits, lectures, and programs that reflect the intersection of Eastern and Western cultures.

The museum was established in 1957 by Natalie Hays Hammond (1904–1985) as a place where Eastern and Western cultures could be appreciated. In 1979, she was awarded the Medallion Award of the Westchester Community College Foundation for founding the Hammond Museum and her art.
