= Johannesburg Reform Committee =

Organization of prominent Johannesburg citizens

The Reform Committee was an organisation of prominent Johannesburg citizens that existed late 1895 and early 1896.

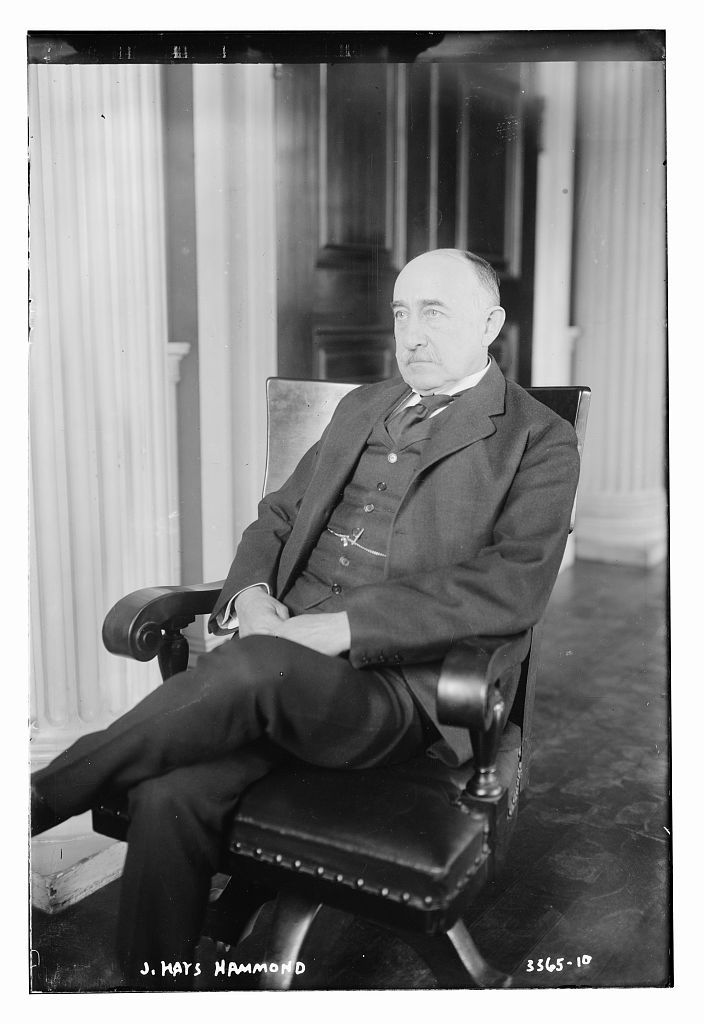
John Hays Hammond appearing before the Commission on Industrial Relations in 1915

The Transvaal gold rush had brought in a considerable foreign population, which was chiefly British although there were substantial minorities from other nations. The Boers referred to them as Uitlanders (foreigners). The immigrants, who were by far the wealthiest part of the community, formed a Reform Committee headed by Lionel Phillips, Charles Leonard, Colonel Frank Rhodes (brother of Cecil), John Hays Hammond, Chief mining engineer from California Victor Clement, and a few others. They demanded a stable constitution, a fair franchise law, an independent judiciary and a better educational system. The government, under President Paul Kruger, made promises but failed to keep them.

Some members of the Committee had been instrumental in the preparation for the Jameson Raid. Leander Starr Jameson had been in charge of Matabeleland but overstepped his authority and invaded Transvaal with 1,500 troops. That greatly exacerbated the many adverse conditions that would lead to both the Second Matabele War and the Second Boer War. Upon Jameson's capture and surrender to the forces of the South African Republic (the Transvaal) in December 1895, the Committee took charge of the peace and security of Johannesburg before it conceded control back to the Boer authorities some days later.

For conspiring with Jameson, the members of the Reform Committee were charged, confined in deplorable conditions and finally found guilty of high treason against the Transvaal. Many received severe sentences, including death, but the majority of the membership escaped with high fines in January 1896. When a second trial of the Reform Committee was called in late April, the leaders were condemned to death by hanging, but punishments were commuted to fines and imprisonment the next day as a gesture of magnanimity on the part of President Kruger and his government. For the next few weeks, the Reform Committee leaders were jailed in deplorable conditions, and some, including Hammond, nearly died. In May it was announced that the Reform Committee leaders would have to spend 15 years in prison, but by mid-June, Kruger had released Hammond and the final six Reform Committee members still in jail after each had paid a $125,000 fine.

== See also ==
- Jameson Raid

== Bibliography ==
- The truth about the Jameson raid, by John Hays Hammond (1918)
- The Autobiography of John Hays Hammond, volumes 1 and 2, (1935)
- Rhoodie, DO - Conspirators in Conflict: A Study of the Johannesburg Reform Committee and its Role in the Conspiracy Against the South African Republic, Tafelberg-Uitgewers (1967)
