= Richard Pindle Hammond =

American composer (1896–1980)

Richard Pindle Hammond (August 26, 1896 – December 2, 1980) was an American composer. His composition teachers included Emerson Whithorne, Mortimer Wilson, and Nadia Boulanger. He wrote numerous works for orchestra and some chamber music, as well as choral works.

== Biography ==
He was born on August 26, 1896, in England to John Hays Hammond. Among his siblings were inventor John Hays Hammond, Jr., and painter Natalie Hays Hammond. He came to the United States to study at Yale University and he served in the United States Navy during World War I. He died in December 1980 in New York City.
