= John Hays Hammond Jr. =

American inventor (1888–1965)

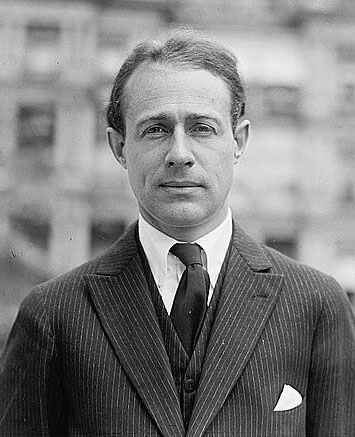
- Hammond in 1922
- Born: April 13, 1888; San Francisco, California, U.S.
- Died: February 12, 1965 (aged 76); New York City, U.S.
- Education: Yale University (B.S., 1910)
- Occupation: inventor
- Spouse: Irene E. Fenton Reynolds
- Parent(s): John Hays Hammond Sr; Natalie Harris Hammond
- Relatives: Natalie Hays Hammond (sister); Richard Pindle Hammond (brother)
- Awards: IEEE Medal of Honor (1963)

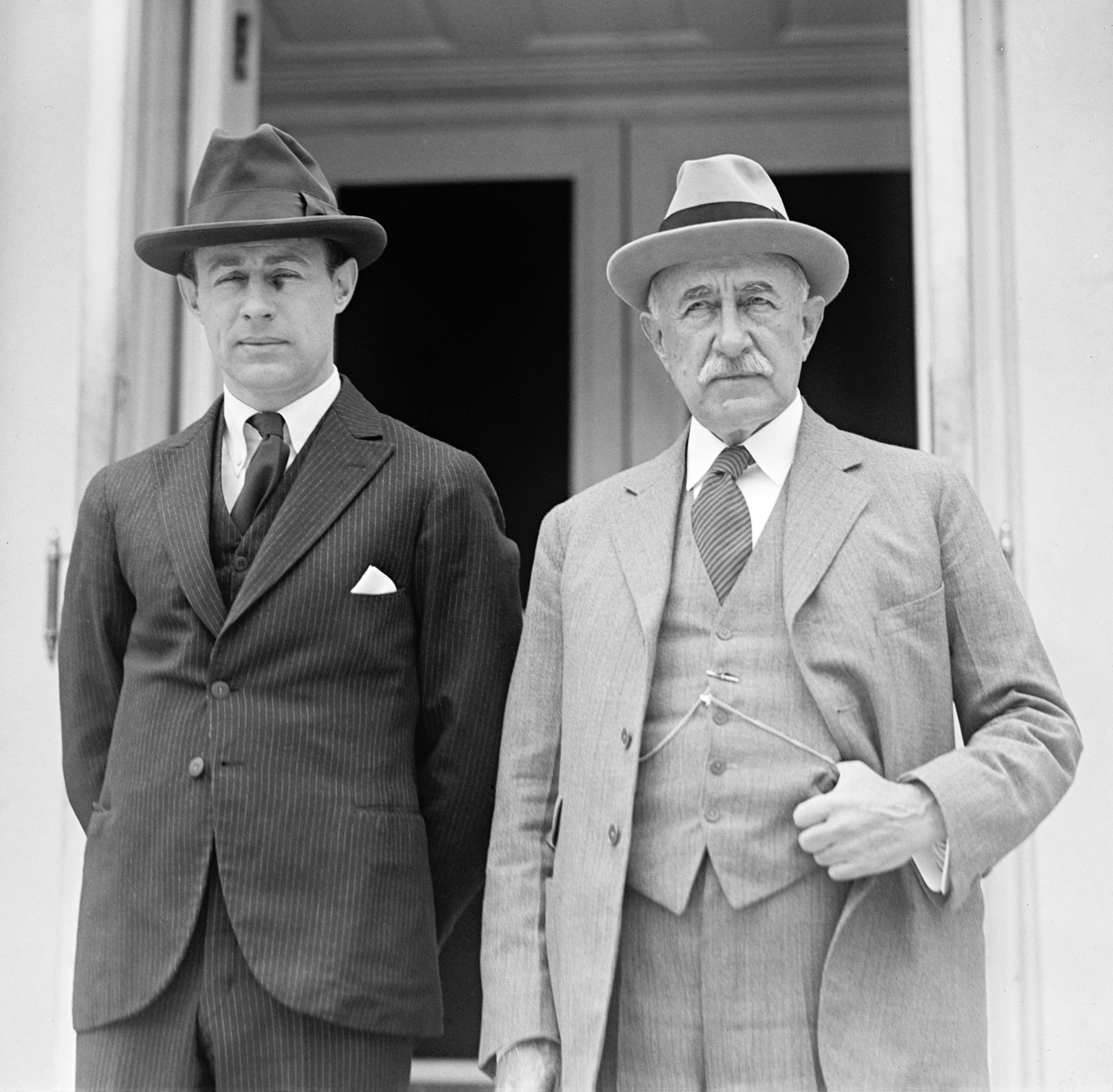
John Hays Hammond Jr. and Sr., 1922

John Hays Hammond Jr. (April 13, 1888 – February 12, 1965) was an American inventor known as "The Father of Radio Control". Hammond's pioneering developments in electronic remote control are the foundation for all modern radio remote control devices, including modern missile guidance systems, unmanned aerial vehicles (UAVs), and the unmanned combat aerial vehicle (UCAVs). Of Hammond's many individual inventions, the inventions which have seen the most significant application are the variable pitch or controlled pitch propellers and single dial radio tuning. He was the son of mining engineer John Hays Hammond Sr.

== Biography ==
Born in San Francisco, California, he and his family moved to South Africa and the Transvaal in 1893. His father was active as a mining engineer for Cecil Rhodes' mines in South Africa. In 1898, the family moved to England, where young Hammond fell in love with castles and life in earlier times. The family returned to the United States at the turn of the 20th century.

At the age of twelve, Hammond accompanied his father on a business trip to Thomas Edison’s laboratory in West Orange, New Jersey. Upon being introduced to Edison, the boy asked so many questions that the inventor gave him a personal tour of the complex and assumed the role of mentor. The two would remain in contact for the rest of Edison’s life. While studying at the Sheffield Scientific School of Yale University, Hammond became interested in the new study of radio waves, and he was taken under the wing of Alexander Graham Bell. Bell also became his mentor, and the two would remain close friends until Bell’s death.

After graduation from Yale in 1910, Hammond took a job in the U.S. Patent Office; he had learned from Edison that "inventing had to be a money-making proposition, where better to learn what fields were up-and-coming than in the Patent Office?" After he became an authority on the patent process, he founded the Hammond Radio Research Laboratory on his father's estate in Gloucester, Massachusetts. In total, he is credited with more than 800 foreign and domestic patents on more than 400 inventions (the exact number of inventions is vague due to how credit was listed on the forms), mostly in the fields of radio control and naval weaponry.

He served on the Board of Directors of RCA and a listing of his professional colleagues and society friends reads like a Who’s Who of the rich and famous. Aside from his inherited wealth, his inventions brought Hammond an additional fortune. Between the years 1926 and 1929, he built a castle (including a drawbridge) which became his home, laboratory, and a showplace for his collection of Roman, medieval, and Renaissance artifacts. Hammond was also interested in the mechanism and workings of the pipe organ, and had a huge organ installed in the castle's Great Hall. Famous organists, including Richard Ellsasser and Virgil Fox, performed and made commercial recordings on this instrument, unfortunately no longer in operating condition (2015). Overlooking Gloucester Harbor in the North Shore region of Massachusetts, Hammond Castle is now a museum which offers self-guided tours throughout half the year and hosts fundraising events on a regular basis.

Hammond was awarded the Edward Longstreth Medal from The Franklin Institute in Philadelphia, Pennsylvania in 1959.

== Personal life ==
Hammond married Gloucester resident, artist, and devout spiritualist Irene Fenton in 1925. In addition to his marriage, Hammond was part of a homosexual/pansexual circle surrounding A. Piatt Andrew, actor Leslie Buswell, and interior designer Henry Davis Sleeper, referring to the B.A.S.H. acronym often referenced in Gloucester culture (B.A.S.H. standing for Buswell, Andrew, Sleeper, and Hammond).

== In popular culture ==
Hammond Castle was investigated by The Atlantic Paranormal Society (TAPS) in 2012 for paranormal activity, and this was shown on the TV show Ghost Hunters. The castle was also featured in season 1 of the PBS reality-game show Fetch! with Ruff Ruffman.

== Inventions ==
Examples of Hammond's 400+ U.S. patents:

10/21/1919 – System of Teledynamic Control (1,275,741)
5/20/1922 – System for Radio Control of Moving Bodies (1,420,258)
11/6/1928 – Submarine sound transmission (1,500,243)
3/18/1929 – Multi-channel radio system (1,717,662)
12/29/1931 – Secret Radio Communication (1,838,762)
5/19/1931 – Paravane Torpedo (1,806,346)
12/14/1936 – Gaseous Detector of Radiant Energy (1,610,371)
5/27/1941 – Variable Pitch Propeller Control (2,243,095)
7/11/1944 – Radio Alarm System (2,343,499)

== See also ==
- Nikola Tesla, friend of Hammond
- Natalie Hays Hammond (1904–1985), artist and inventor of a form of appliqué, was the sister of John Hays Hammond Jr.
- Richard Pindle Hammond (1896–1980), composer of orchestral and chamber music, was the brother of John Hays Hammond Jr.
