= Richard Ellsasser =

American concert organist, composer, and conductor

Richard Ellsasser

Richard Ellsasser (September 14, 1926 - August 9, 1972) was an American concert organist, composer, and conductor who was primarily active during the 1940s to 1960s.

== Life and career ==
Born in Cleveland, Ohio, on September 14, 1926, he was a musical prodigy who studied piano and organ, first with his father Frederick Ellsasser, a musician in the Cleveland Orchestra, and later with Winslow Cheney and Albert Riemenschneider. Ellsasser also studied with Joseph Bonnet. At the age of seven, he toured the eastern United States as an organist with various symphony orchestras. He made his New York organ debut in 1937. He graduated high school with high honors at the age of 14. He attended Oberlin College briefly and later Baldwin-Wallace College (from which he obtained his Bachelor of Music degree), and graduated at age 17. At the age of 19, he became the youngest person in history to have played, from memory, all 200+ organ works of Johann Sebastian Bach,

In 1946, he embarked on a transcontinental tour of the United States that visited 27 states in two months. In the middle of the tour, on his 20th birthday, his airplane crashed near Stockton, California. Ellsasser and others were unharmed, but the tour's secretary William Akers died. He went on to complete the tour, having performed for over 40,000 people.

Ellsasser later went on to study at the School of Theology at Boston University, and the School of Religion at the University of Southern California (where he earned a Master's Degree in Theology). Ellsasser also earned a Doctorate from Boston University.

For many years, Ellsasser was Minister of Music at Wilshire United Methodist Church in Los Angeles, California, where he later created and directed a series of music festivals. In later years, he became Minister of Recitals at the First Congregational Church of Los Angeles. NBC featured the young organist on the air with the production of "The Ellsasser Show." He had perfect pitch, and was also gifted in the art of improvisation and often included an improvisation as part of his concerts. This was typically in the form of a submitted theme in a sealed envelope.

Additionally, he was founder and, for several seasons, director of the Bach Circle of Boston.

A prolific recording artist, Ellsasser made numerous "private label" recordings during the 1950s for MGM Records, primarily at the Hammond Castle Museum in Gloucester, Massachusetts. He also recorded several albums for Kapp Records.

During the 1960s, Ellsasser became a faculty member at the National Music Camp in Interlochen, Michigan.

In 1967, Ellsasser recorded two albums for Nonesuch Records at the Hammond Castle Museum. Shortly after completing these recordings, he suffered a stroke, which forced him into retirement. He came out of retirement in January 1972 when he accepted a position as Minister of Music at the United Baptist Church of Jamaica Plain, Massachusetts (Boston); this was his last church position. He continued to conduct workshops, accompany musicals and perform in a few concerts during the last year of his life. He died on August 9, 1972, in New York City, some six weeks prior to what would have been his 46th birthday.

Ellsasser "freely arranged for the modern organ" a lively Rondo in G that he attributed to John Bull centuries earlier. The Rondo is "not known to have existed at all" before Ellsasser published his arrangement in 1951, and he is generally presumed to have been the composer.
