= Natalie Hays Hammond =

American artist, writer, and inventor

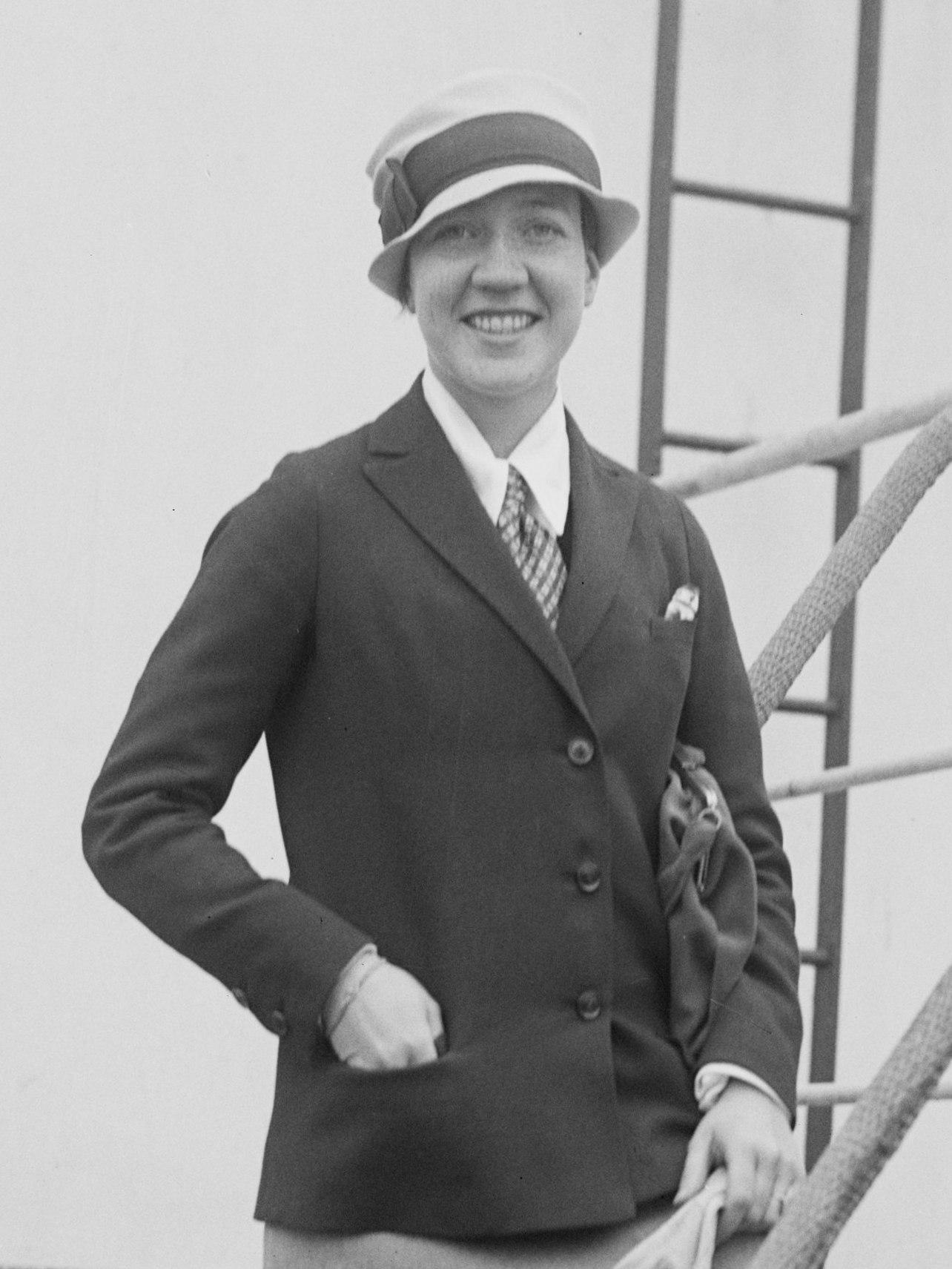
- Born: January 6, 1904; Lakewood, New Jersey
- Died: June 30, 1985 (aged 81); North Salem, New York
- Occupations: Painter, miniaturist, Broadway set and costume designer, author, textiles
- Parent(s): John Hays Hammond; Natalie (Harris) Hammond

Natalie Hays Hammond (January 6, 1904 – June 30, 1985) was an American artist, writer, and inventor. She worked in the fields of painting, miniatures, textile arts, and costume and set design. She worked with Martha Graham and Alice D. Laughlin to create the first woman-produced Broadway theatre production.

== Early life ==
Natalie Hays Hammond was born in Lakewood, New Jersey in 1904. Her parents were millionaires. Her father was John Hays Hammond and her mother was Natalie Harris. John Hays Hammond, Jr., her brother, was the eventual founder of Hammond Castle. As a 10-year-old child, she inspired her mother to start the War Children's Christmas Fund in support of European orphans in World War I. Hammond chose to work and stay active, instead of becoming a socialite, like some other rich young people.

== Mid-life and career ==
Hammond was a costume and set designer. At the age of 22, she won a competition held at the American Laboratory Theatre to design the sets and costumes for a play starring Alla Nazimova. Hammond was an art collector. She collected works by Carl Van Vechten. She also collected hand fans. In 1926, Cecil Thomas created a bust of Hammond, which was exhibited at the Royal Academy of Arts the same year. Hammond was friends with Martha Graham and met photographer Soichi Sunami through Graham. Sunami would photograph Hammond during their friendship.

In 1931, Hammond invented and patented a form of appliqué which allowed metal to be applied to fabrics.

By 1940 she was living in Gloucester, Massachusetts. Her Gloucester home was designed by Eleanor Raymond. The home consisted of four buildings: one for Hammond, two for her friends, and one for servants and dining. Hammond set up a program, called Civic Patrol, to teach young girls emergency communication and transportation skills. The mission was to train the girls in case they had to serve in World War II.

During her lifetime, she was engaged seven times. She never married. She designed her own needlepoint patterns, and published a book about her work in 1949.

== Later life and legacy ==
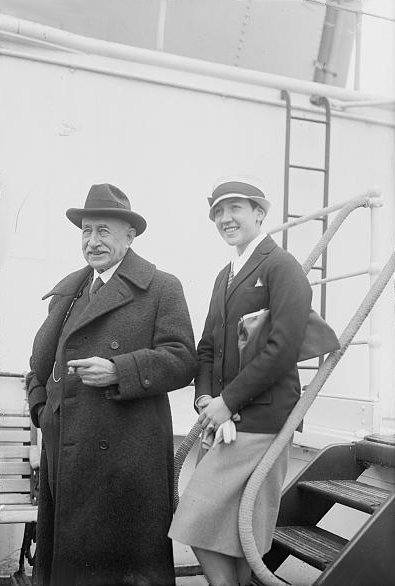
Hammond with her father, John Hays Hammond, Sr.

Hammond moved to North Salem, New York. Her home and Japanese garden became the Hammond Museum and Japanese Stroll Garden. In 1979, she was awarded the Medallion Award of the Westchester Community College Foundation for founding the Hammond Museum and her art.

Ephemera collections of Hammond's are held in the Brooklyn Museum and National Portrait Gallery. In 2012, the Hammond Museum held an exhibition about Hammond titled Celebrating Natalie Hays Hammond, An Eclectic Life.
