= Hugo Reinhold =

Austrian composer and pianist

Hugo Reinhold (3 March 1854 – 4 September 1935) was an Austrian composer and pianist.

He was born and died in Vienna. He was admitted to the Conservatorium der Musikfreunde, where he studied under Anton Bruckner, Felix Dessoff and Julius Epstein, among others. He left the conservatory at the age of 20, and later taught piano at the Akademie der Tonkunst in Vienna.

During his lifetime he was quite popular and his works were performed by the Vienna Philharmonic and the Hellmesberger Quartet.

Some of his works include:

- Suite for piano and strings
- Prelude, Minuet and Fugue for strings
- String Quartet in A, Op. 18
- Impromptu in C♯ minor, Op. 28, No. 3, for piano
