= Jameson Raid =

Raid on the South African Republic

- Part of the Boer Wars
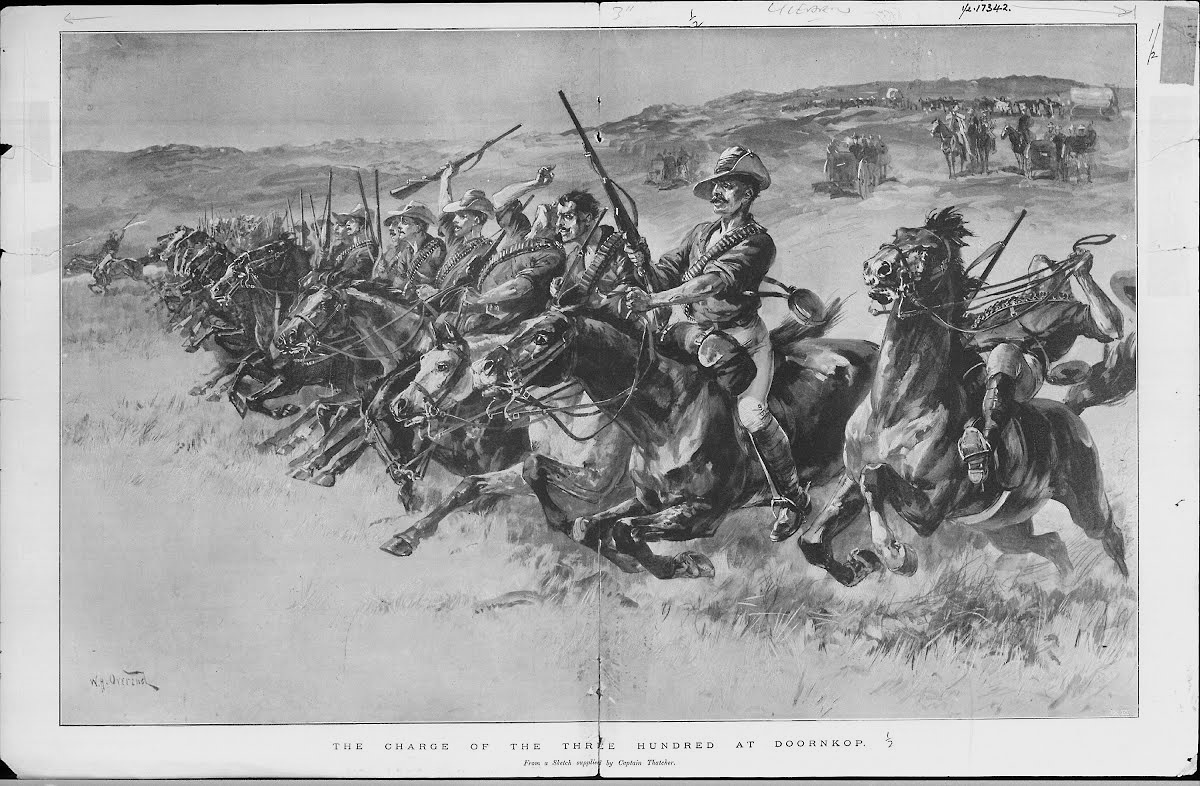
- Cape Colony Soldiers charging the Boer Defenses at Doornkop on 1 January 1896
Date	29 December 1895 – 2 January 1896
Location	South African Republic 26.1°S 27.8°E
Result	South African Republic victory, see: Aftermath

Belligerents
Cape Colony	South African Republic

Commanders and leaders
(Cape Colony) Leander Starr Jameson (Cape Colony) Cecil Rhodes	(South African Republic) Piet Cronjé

Casualties and losses
18 killed 40 wounded	4 killed 5 wounded
- Location within South Africa

The Jameson Raid (Afrikaans: Jameson-inval, lit. ''Jameson's Invasion'', 29 December 1895 – 2 January 1896) was a botched raid against the South African Republic (commonly known as the Transvaal) carried out by British colonial administrator Leander Starr Jameson, under the employment of Cecil Rhodes. It involved 500 British South Africa Company police and was launched from Rhodesia over the New Year weekend of 1895–96. Paul Kruger, for whom Rhodes had great personal hatred, was president of the South African Republic at the time. The raid was intended to trigger an uprising by the primarily British expatriate and settler workers (known as Uitlanders) in the Transvaal, but it failed.

The workers were referred to as the Johannesburg Conspirators. They were expected to recruit an army and prepare for an insurrection; however, the raid was ineffective, and no uprising took place. The results included embarrassment of the British government; the replacement of Cecil Rhodes as prime minister of the Cape Colony; and the strengthening of Boer dominance of the Transvaal and its gold mines. Also, the withdrawal of so many fighting men left Rhodesia vulnerable, one factor that led just a couple of months later to the Second Matabele War. The raid was a contributory cause of the Second Boer War.

== Background ==
What later became the nation of South Africa was not politically unified in the late nineteenth century. The territory had four distinct entities: the two British colonies of Cape Colony and Natal; and the two Boer republics of the Orange Free State and the South African Republic, more commonly referred to as the Transvaal.

=== Foundation of the colonies and republics ===
The Cape, more specifically the small area around present day Cape Town, was the first part of South Africa to be settled by Europeans.

The Dutch East India Company (Vereenigde Oost-Indische Compagnie, VOC) officials did not favour the permanent settlement of Europeans in their trading empire, although during the 140 years of Dutch rule many VOC servants retired or were discharged and remained as private citizens. A small number of longtime VOC employees, however, expressed interest in applying for grants of land with the objective of retiring at the Cape as farmers. In time, they came to form a class of former VOC employees, vrijlieden, also known as vrijburgers (free citizens) who stayed in Dutch territories overseas after serving their contracts. Over generations, this settled European population came to form a distinct identity as Afrikaners (formerly sometimes Afrikaander or Afrikaaner, from the Dutch Africaander) or Boers (farmers).

In 1806, the Cape was colonised by the British Empire. Initially British control was aimed to protect the trade route to the East from Napoleon, however, the British soon realised the potential to develop the Cape colony further. Antipathy towards British control and the introduction of new systems and institutions grew amongst a substantial portion of the Afrikaner/Boer community. Between 1834 and 1840 about 15 000 Boers left the Cape Colony in parties of ox-wagons, in search of sovereignty beyond British-claimed territories. These emigrants primarily consisted Trekboers, frontier farmers in the East who had been at the front of the colony's eastward expansion. The emigration became known as the Great Trek and the emigrants Voortrekkers. Details on the various motives behind the Great Trek are laid out in the Voortrekker leader, Piet Retief's 1837 manifesto.

The Voortrekkers first moved east into the territory later known as Natal. In 1839, they founded the Natalia Republic as a new Boer homeland. Other Voortrekker parties moved north, settling beyond the Orange and Vaal rivers.

Disregarding the Voortrekkers' effortful attempt to claim independence, Britain annexed the Natalia Republic in 1843, which became the Crown colony of Natal. After 1843, British government policy turned strongly against further expansion in South Africa. Although there were some abortive attempts to annex more territories to the north, Britain formally recognised their independence by the Sand River Convention of 1852 and the Orange River Convention of 1854, for the Transvaal and the Orange Free State, respectively.

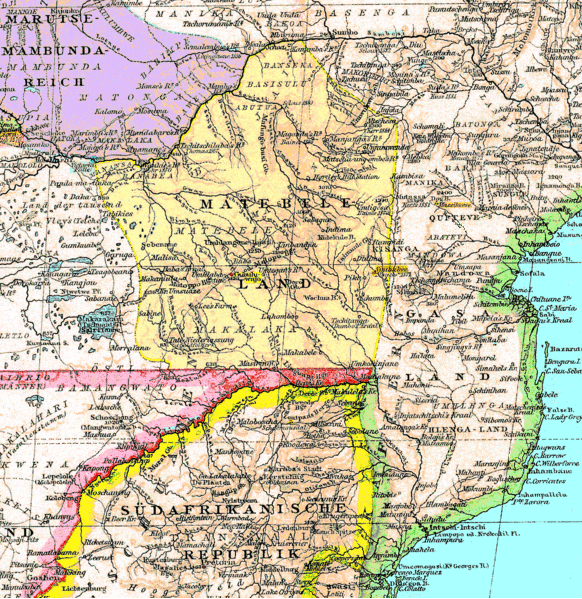
South-East Africa, 1887

After the First Anglo-Boer War, Gladstone's government restored the Transvaal's independence in 1884 by signing the London Convention, not knowing that the colossal gold deposits of the Witwatersrand would be struck two years later by Jan Gerrit Bantjes (1843-1911).

=== Economics ===
In spite of the political divisions, the four territories were strongly linked. Each was populated by European-African emigrants from the Cape; many citizens had relatives or friends in other territories. As the largest and oldest state in Southern Africa, the Cape was economically, culturally, and socially dominant; the population of Natal and the two Boer republics were mostly subsistence farmers.

The fairly simple agricultural dynamic was upset in 1870, when vast diamond fields were discovered in Griqualand West, around modern-day Kimberley. Although the territory had historically come under the authority of the Orange Free State, the Cape government, with the assistance of the British government, annexed the area.

=== Discovery of gold ===
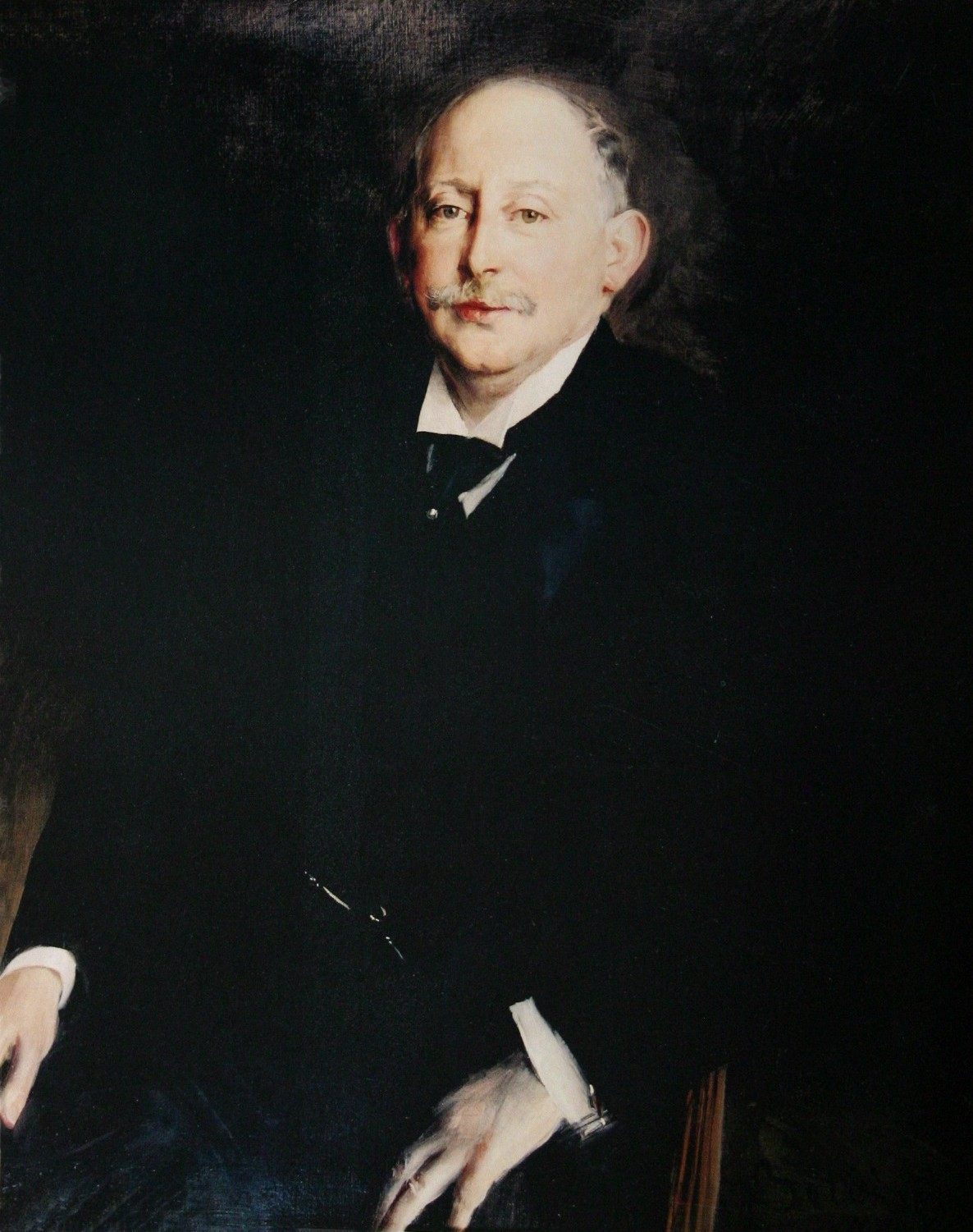
Beit, associate of Rhodes and privy to Jameson's plans, financed the revolutionists to the order of £400,000 and was subsequently censured in the House of Commons and British press.

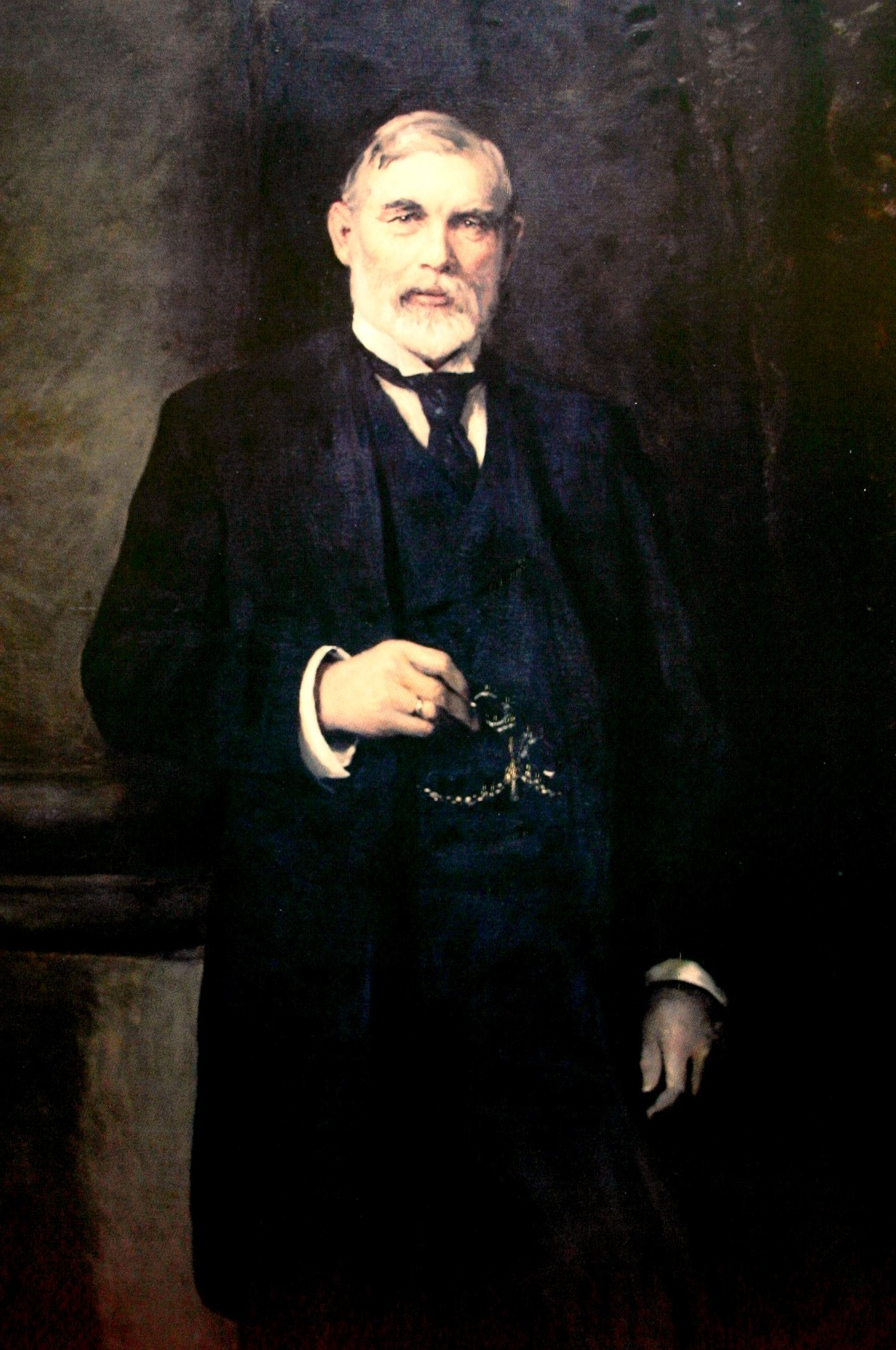
Wernher, Beit's business partner, was not drawn into the investigation, and his role, at least in the raid's initial stages, remains unproven.

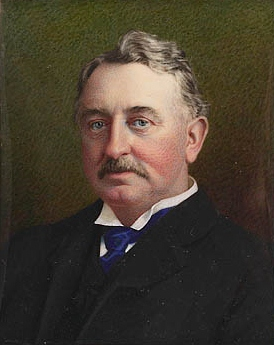
In the raid's aftermath Rhodes was severely censured and had to resign as chairman of the Chartered Company and Cape prime minister.

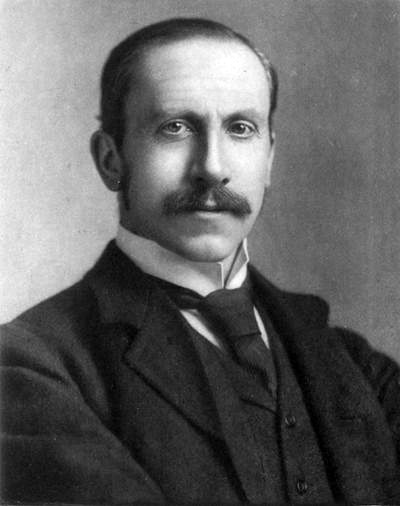
To re-engineer the subjugation of Transvaal, Milner was appointed High Commissioner to South Africa and Lt.-Governor of the Cape in 1897.

In June 1884, Jan Gerrit Bantjes (1843–1914) discovered signs of gold at Vogelstruisfontein (the first gold sold directly to Cecil Rhodes at Bantjes's camp for £3,000) followed in September by the Struben brothers at Wilgespruit near Roodepoort which started the Witwatersrand Gold Rush and modern-day Johannesburg. The first gold mines of the Witwatersrand were the Bantjes Consolidated Mines. By 1886 it was clear that there were massive deposits of gold in the main reef. Increasingly Uitlanders (non-Afrikaner European expatriates and settlers, mainly from Britain but also including other Europeans, Americans and Australians), had come into the republic in search of employment and fortune. The discovery of gold made the Transvaal overnight the richest and potentially the most powerful nation in southern Africa, but it attracted so many Uitlanders (in 1896 approximately 60,000) that they quickly outnumbered the Boers (approximately 30,000 white male Boers).

Fearful of the Transvaal's losing independence and becoming a British colony, the Boer government adopted policies of protectionism and exclusion, to include restrictions requiring Uitlanders to be resident for at least four years in the Transvaal to obtain the franchise, or right to vote. They heavily taxed the growing gold mining industry which was more dominated by incoming Uitlanders. Due to this taxation, the Uitlanders became increasingly resentful and aggrieved about the lack of representation. President Paul Kruger called a closed council, including Jan Gerrit Bantjes, to discuss the growing problem and it was decided to put a heavy tax on the sale of dynamite to non-Boer residents. Jan G. Bantjes, fluent in both spoken and written Dutch and English, was a close confidant of Paul Kruger with their link dating to the Great Trek days. Jan's father, Jan Gerritze Bantjes, had given Paul Kruger his elementary education during the trek and Jan Gerritse was part of his inner core of associates. This closed council would be the committee which set the Transvaal Republic on a collision course with Great Britain and the Anglo-Boer War 1899-1902 and which set German feelings toward Britain at boiling point by siding with the Boers. Because of this applied dynamite tax, considerable discontent and tensions began to rise. As Johannesburg was largely an Uitlander city, non-boer leaders there began to discuss the proposals for an insurrection.

Cecil Rhodes, Prime Minister of the Cape Colony, had a desire to incorporate the Transvaal and the Orange Free State in a federation under British control. Having combined his commercial mining interests with Alfred Beit to form the De Beers Mining Corporation, the two men also wanted to control the Johannesburg gold mining industry. They played a major role in fomenting Uitlander grievances.

Rhodes later told the journalist W.T. Stead that he feared that a Uitlander rebellion would cause trouble for Britain if not controlled by him:

It seemed to me quite certain that if I did not take a hand in the game the forces on the spot would soon make short work of President Kruger. Then I should be face to face with an American Republic—American in the sense of being intensely hostile to and jealous of Britain—an American Republic largely manned by Americans and Sydney Bulletin Australians who cared nothing for the [Union Jack]. They would have all the Rand at their disposal. The drawing power of the Outlander Republic would have collected round it all the other Colonies. They would have federated with it as a centre, and we should have lost South Africa. To avert this catastrophe, to rope in the Outlanders before it was too late, I did what I did.

In mid-1895, Rhodes planned a raid by an armed column from Rhodesia, the British colony to the north, to support an uprising of Uitlanders with the goal of taking control. The raid soon ran into difficulties, beginning with hesitation by the Uitlander leaders.

=== Drifts Crisis ===
In September and October 1895, a dispute between the Transvaal and Cape Colony governments arose over Boer trade protectionism. The Cape Colony had refused to pay the high rates charged by the Transvaal government for use of the Transvaal portion of the railway line to Johannesburg, instead opting to send its goods by wagon train directly across the Vaal River, over a set of fords (known as 'drifts' in South Africa). Transvaal president Paul Kruger responded by closing the drifts, angering the Cape Colony government. While Transvaal eventually relented, relations between the nation and Cape Colony remained strained.

== Jameson force and the initiation of the raid ==
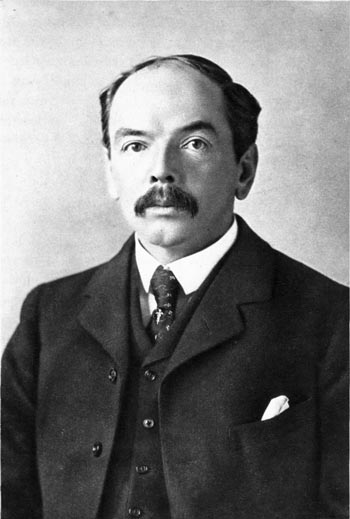
Sir Leander Starr Jameson

As part of the planning, a force had been placed at Pitsane, on the border of the Transvaal, by the order of Rhodes so as to be able to quickly offer support to the Uitlanders in the uprising. The force was placed under the control of Leander Starr Jameson, the administrator general of the chartered company (of which Cecil Rhodes was the chairman) for Matabeleland. Among the other commanders was Raleigh Grey. The force was around 600 men, about 400 from the Matabeleland Mounted Police and the remainder other volunteers. It was equipped with rifles, somewhere between eight and sixteen Maxim machine guns, and between three and eleven light artillery pieces.

The plan was that Johannesburg would revolt and seize the Boer armoury in Pretoria. Jameson and his force would dash across the border to Johannesburg to "restore order" and with control of Johannesburg would control the gold fields.

However, while Jameson waited for the insurrection to begin, differences arose within the Reform Committee and between Johannesburg Uitlander reformers regarding the form of government to be adopted after the coup. At a point, certain reformers contacted Jameson to inform him of the difficulties and advised him to stand down. Jameson, with 600 restless men and other pressures, became frustrated by the delays and, believing that he could spur the reluctant Johannesburg reformers to act, decided to go ahead. He sent a telegram on 28 December 1895 to Rhodes warning him of his intentions – "Unless I hear definitely to the contrary, shall leave to-morrow evening" – and on the very next day sent a further message, "Shall leave to-night for the Transvaal". However, the transmission of the first telegram was delayed, so that both arrived at the same time on the morning of 29 December, and by then Jameson's men had cut the telegraph wires and there was no way of recalling him.

On 29 December 1895, Jameson's armed column crossed into the Transvaal and headed for Johannesburg. They hoped that this would be a three-day dash to Johannesburg before the Boer commandos could mobilise, and would trigger an uprising by the Uitlanders.

The British Colonial Secretary, Joseph Chamberlain, though sympathetic to the ultimate goals of the raid, realized it would be a mistake since the uitlanders were not supportive. He immediately tried to stop it, remarking that "if this succeeds it will ruin me. I'm going up to London to crush it". He rushed back to London and ordered Sir Hercules Robinson, governor of the Cape Colony, to repudiate the actions of Jameson and warned Rhodes that the company's charter would be in danger if it were discovered the Cape Prime Minister was involved in the raid. Chamberlain therefore instructed local British representatives to call on British colonists not to offer any aid to the raiders.

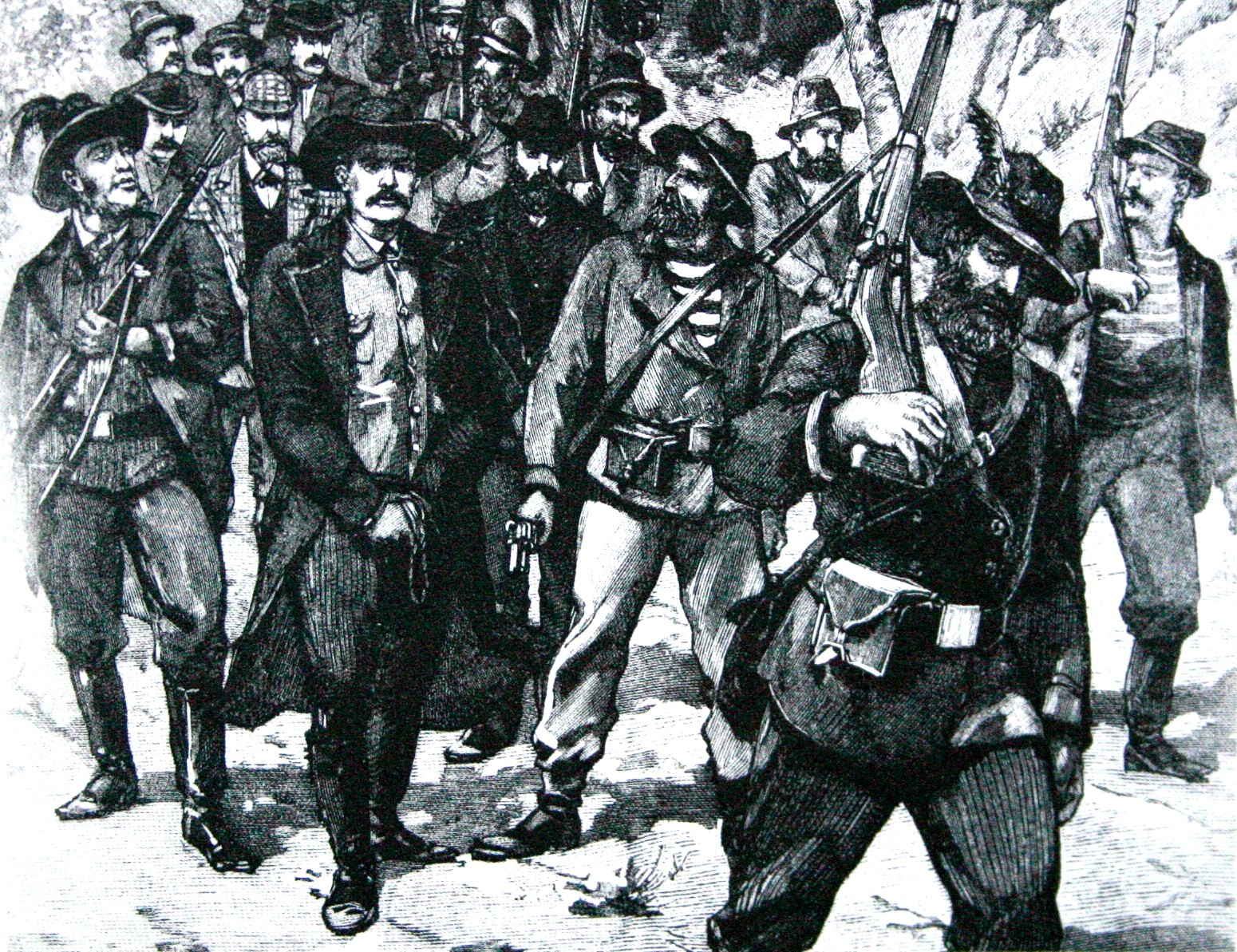
Arrest of Jameson after the raid – Petit Parisien 1896

Sir John Christopher Willoughby was second in command and took command of the expedition when the two columns united northwest of Johannesburg on 30 December.

Although Jameson's men had cut the telegraph wires to Cape Town, they had failed to cut the telegraph wires to Pretoria (cutting a fence by mistake). Accordingly, news of his incursion quickly reached Pretoria and Jameson's armed column was tracked by Transvaal forces from the moment that it crossed the border. The Jameson armed column first encountered resistance very early on 1 January when there was a very brief exchange of fire with a Boer outpost. Around noon the Jameson armed column was around twenty miles further on, at Krugersdorp, where a small force of Boer soldiers had blocked the road to Johannesburg and dug in and prepared defensive positions. Jameson's force spent some hours exchanging fire with the Boers, losing several men and many horses in the skirmish. Towards evening the Jameson armed column withdrew and turned south-east attempting to flank the Boer force. The Boers tracked the move overnight and on 2 January, as the light improved, a substantial Boer force with some artillery was waiting for Jameson at Doornkop. The tired raiders initially exchanged fire with the Boers, losing around thirty men before Jameson realized the position was hopeless and surrendered to Commandant Piet Cronjé. The raiders were taken to Pretoria and jailed.

== Aftermath ==
External image
- Gravestones and memorials of the fallen in the Burgershoop Cemetery in Krugersdorp

The Boer government later handed the men over to the British for trial and the British prisoners were returned to London. A few days after the raid, the Kaiser of Germany sent a telegram (the "Kruger telegram") congratulating President Kruger and the Transvaal government on their success "without the help of friendly powers", alluding to potential support by Germany. When this was disclosed in the British press, it raised a storm of anti-German feeling. Dr. Jameson was lionised by the press and London society, inflamed by anti-Boer and anti-German feeling and in a frenzy of jingoism. Jameson was sentenced to 15 months for leading the raid, which he served in Holloway Prison, while his second-in-command Willoughby was sentenced to 10 months. The Transvaal government was paid almost £1 million in compensation by the British South Africa Company.

For conspiring with Jameson, the members of the Reform Committee (Transvaal), including Colonel Frank Rhodes and John Hays Hammond, were jailed in deplorable conditions, found guilty of high treason, and sentenced to death by hanging. This sentence was later commuted to 15 years' imprisonment, and in June 1896, all surviving members of the committee were released on payment of stiff fines. As further punishment for his support of Jameson, the highly decorated Col. Rhodes was placed on the retired list by the British Army and barred from active involvement in army business. After his release from jail, Colonel Rhodes immediately joined his brother Cecil and the British South Africa Company in the Second Matabele War taking place just north of the Transvaal in Matabeleland. Cecil Rhodes was forced to resign as Prime Minister of Cape Colony in 1896 due to his apparent involvement in planning and assisting in the raid; he also, along with Alfred Beit, resigned as a director of the British South Africa Company.

Jameson's raid had depleted Matabeleland of many of its troops and left the whole territory vulnerable. Seizing on this weakness, and a discontent with the British South Africa Company, the Ndebele revolted during March 1896 in what is now celebrated in Zimbabwe as the First War of Independence, the First Chimurenga, but it is better known to most of the world as the Second Matabele War. The Shona joined them soon thereafter. Hundreds of European settlers were killed within the first few weeks of the revolt and many more would die over the next year and a half. With few troops to support them, the settlers had to quickly build a laager in the centre of Bulawayo on their own. Against over 50,000 Ndebele held up in their stronghold of the Matobo Hills the settlers mounted patrols under such people as Burnham, Baden-Powell, and Selous. It would not be until October 1897 that the Ndebele and Shona would finally lay down their arms.

== Political impact ==
In Britain the Liberal Party objected to, and later opposed, the Boer War. Later, Jameson became Prime Minister of the Cape Colony (1904–08) and one of the founders of the Union of South Africa. He was made a baronet in 1911 and returned to England in 1912. On his death in 1917, he was buried next to Cecil Rhodes and the 34 BSAC soldiers of the Shangani Patrol (killed in 1893 in the First Matabele War) in the Matobos Hills, near Bulawayo.

== Effect on Anglo-Boer relations ==
The affair brought Anglo-Boer relations to a dangerous low. Tensions were further exacerbated by the "Kruger telegram" from Kaiser Wilhelm II congratulating Kruger on defeating the "raiders". The German telegram came to be widely interpreted as an offer of military aid to the Boers. Wilhelm was already perceived by many as anti-British after initiating a costly naval arms race between Germany and Britain. As tensions quickly mounted, the Transvaal began importing large quantities of arms and signed an alliance with the Orange Free State in 1897. Jan C. Smuts wrote in 1906 of the Raid, "The Jameson Raid was the real declaration of war ... And that is so in spite of the four years of truce that followed ... [the] aggressors consolidated their alliance ... the defenders on the other hand silently and grimly prepared for the inevitable."

Joseph Chamberlain condemned the raid despite previously having approved Rhodes' plans to send armed assistance in the case of a Johannesburg uprising. In London, despite some condemnation by the print-media, most newspapers used the episode as an opportunity to whip-up anti-Boer feelings. Though they faced criminal charges in London for their actions in South Africa, Jameson and his raiders were treated as heroes by much of the popular public. Chamberlain welcomed the escalation by Transvaal as an opportunity to annex the Boer states.

== Modern reactions ==
To this day, Jameson's involvement in the Jameson Raid remains something of an enigma, being somewhat out-of-character with his prior history, the rest of his life and successful later political career. In 2002, The Van Riebeeck Society published Sir Graham Bower's Secret History of the Jameson Raid and the South African Crisis, 1895–1902 (edited by Deryck Schreuder and Jeffrey Butler, Van Riebeeck Society, Cape Town, Second Series No. 33), adding to growing historical evidence that the imprisonment and judgement upon the Raiders at the time of their trial was unjust, in view of what has appeared, in later historical analysis, to have been the calculated political manoeuvres by Joseph Chamberlain and his staff to hide his own involvement and knowledge of the Raid.

In a 2004 review of Sir Graham Bower's account, Alan Cousins commented that "A number of major themes and concerns emerge" from Bower's history, "perhaps the most poignant being Bower’s accounts of his being made a scapegoat in the aftermath of the raid: 'since a scapegoat was wanted I was willing to serve my country in that capacity'."

Cousins writes of Bower that:

a very clear sense of his rigid code of honour is plain, and a conviction that not only unity, peace and happiness in South Africa, but also the peace of Europe would be endangered if he told the truth. He believed that, as he had given Rhodes his word not to divulge certain private conversations, he had to abide by that, while at the same time he was convinced that it would be very damaging to Britain if he said anything to the parliamentary committee to show the close involvement of Sir Hercules Robinson and Joseph Chamberlain in their disreputable encouragement of those plotting an uprising in Johannesburg.

Finally, Cousins states that

in his reflections, Bower has a particularly damning judgement on Chamberlain, whom he accuses of 'brazen lying' to parliament, and of what amounted to forgery in the documents made public for the inquiry. In the report of the committee, Bower was found culpable of complicity, while no blame was attached to Joseph Chamberlain or Robinson. His name was never cleared during his lifetime, and Bower was never reinstated to what he believed should be his proper position in the colonial service: he was, in effect, demoted to the post of Colonial Secretary in Mauritius. The bitterness and sense of betrayal he felt come through very clearly in his comments.

== See also ==
- Drifts Crisis
- Military history of South Africa
- Second Boer War
- Second Matabele War

== Photographic Archives ==
- "Gold Fields : Jameson Raid (1895-1896)". Cory Library for Humanities Research. Rhodes University. Archived from the original on 21 December 2025.
