= Hammond Castle =

Historic house in Massachusetts, United States

- U.S. National Register of Historic Places
- Location within Massachusetts Location within the United States
- Location: 80 Hesperus Ave., Gloucester, Massachusetts
- Coordinates: 42°35′6″N 70°41′35″W
- Built: 1926-1929
- Architect: John Hays Hammond Jr.
- NRHP reference No.: 73000298
- Added to NRHP: May 08, 1973

Hammond Castle is located on the Atlantic coast in the Magnolia area of Gloucester, Massachusetts. The castle, which was constructed between 1926 and 1929, was the home, laboratory, and museum of John Hays Hammond Jr., an inventor and pioneer in the study of remote control who held over four hundred patents. The building is composed of modern and 15th-, 16th-, and 18th-century architectural elements and sits on a rocky cliff overlooking Gloucester Harbor.

The castle operates as the Hammond Castle Museum, displaying Hammond's collection of Roman, medieval, and Renaissance artifacts as well as exhibits about his life and inventions. The Great Hall contains a large pipe organ which has been used for concerts and recordings by organists including Richard Ellsasser and Virgil Fox as well as many other well known artists of the time. The instrument was built by Hammond starting in the early 1920s before the castle was built. It was subsequently moved to the castle upon the castle’s completion and had multiple stages of major changes across the years. Most notably, in the 1940s, 1950s, 1970s, and 1980s. As of 2004, the organ is no longer functional.

== History and development ==
John Hays Hammond Jr. engaged the Boston, Massachusetts architectural firm of Allen & Collens in 1923 to design Hammond's dream residence, a medieval style castle. The original castle was to be a tower house built on his father's Lookout Hill compound. Hammond's close friend, Leslie Buswell, who would soon begin construction on his own nearby home, Stillington Hall, told Hammond he was trying to recreate Chartres Cathedral, almost matching the 121' high nave of the cathedral. In 1924, Hammond called for a more modest redesign which would reduce the height of the structure from 120' to 87' and a footprint of 43' by 30', but maintain the tower house style. After being ordered from the Lookout Hill property by his parents, Hammond moved to purchase a new site a mile to the south near Norman's Woe Reef. A complete redesign was developed which resulted in a shorter castle (81') but larger footprint (142' by 70').

== Gallery ==
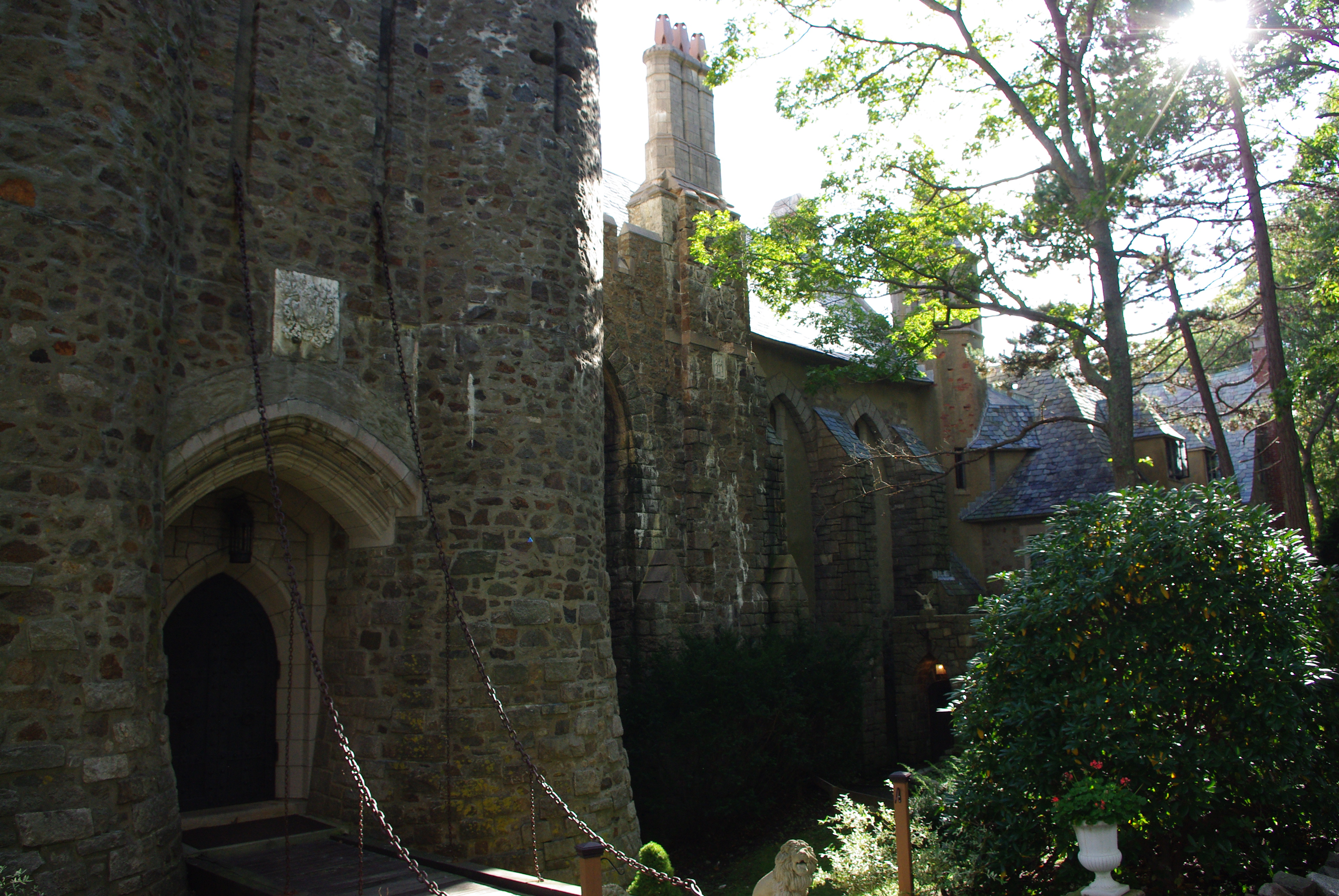
The front of the castle.

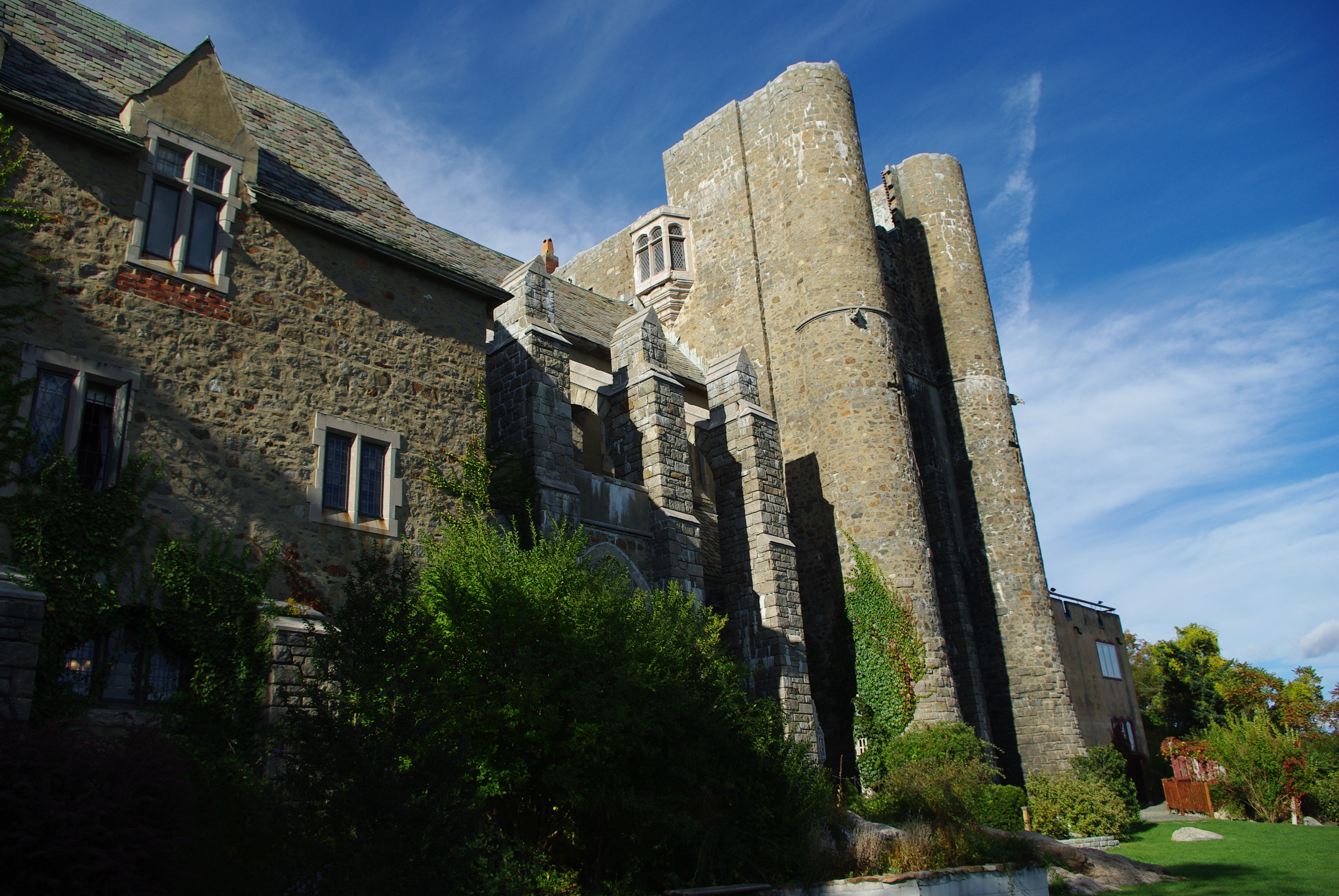
The back of the castle.

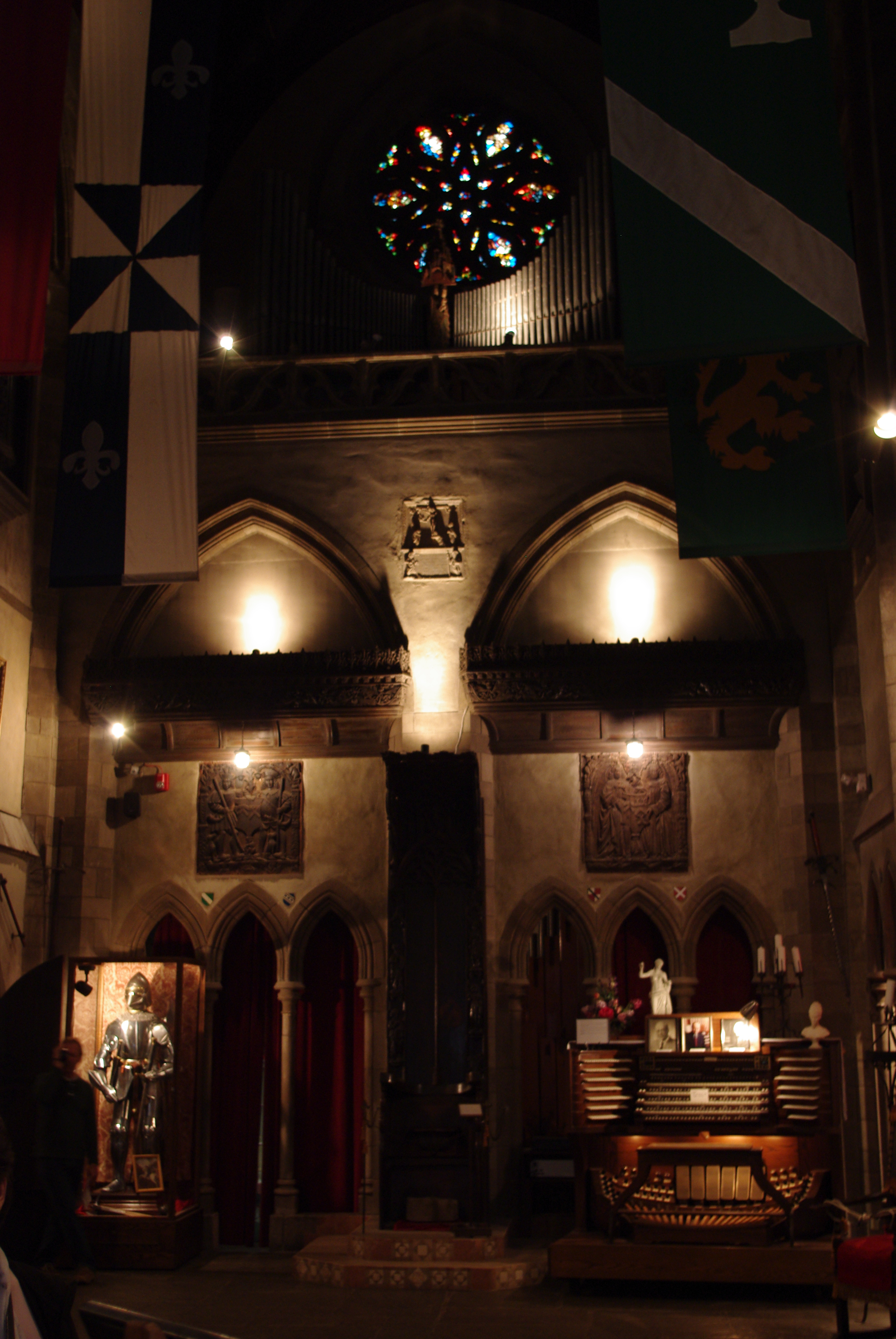
The great hall inside the castle.

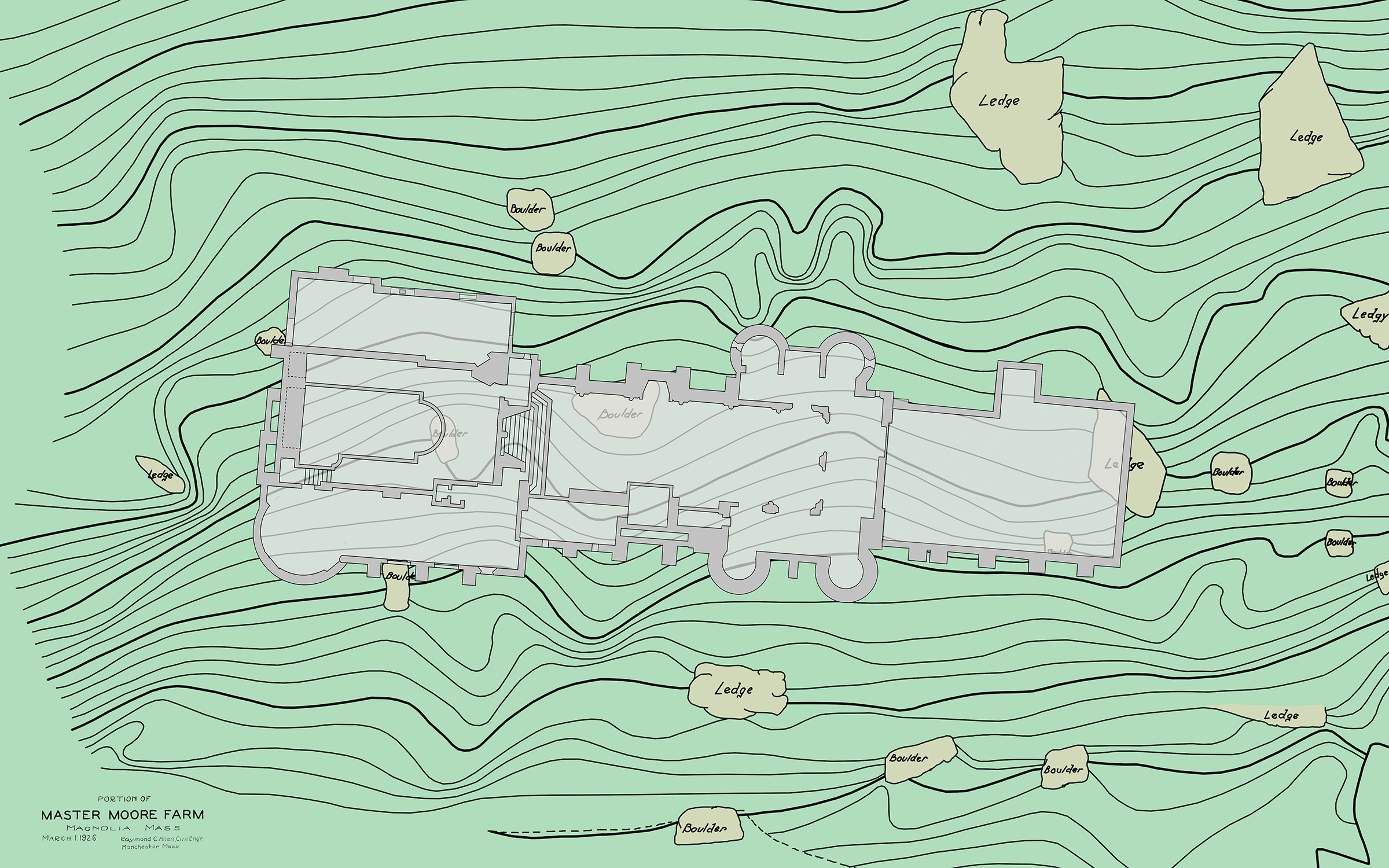
March 1926 survey map with the June 1926 blueprint of the first floor and 1928 laboratory blueprint.

Hammond Castle as seen from the southeast.

== See also ==
- National Register of Historic Places listings in Gloucester, Massachusetts
- National Register of Historic Places listings in Essex County, Massachusetts
