= Uitlander =

Migrant worker in the Transvaal Republic, South Africa

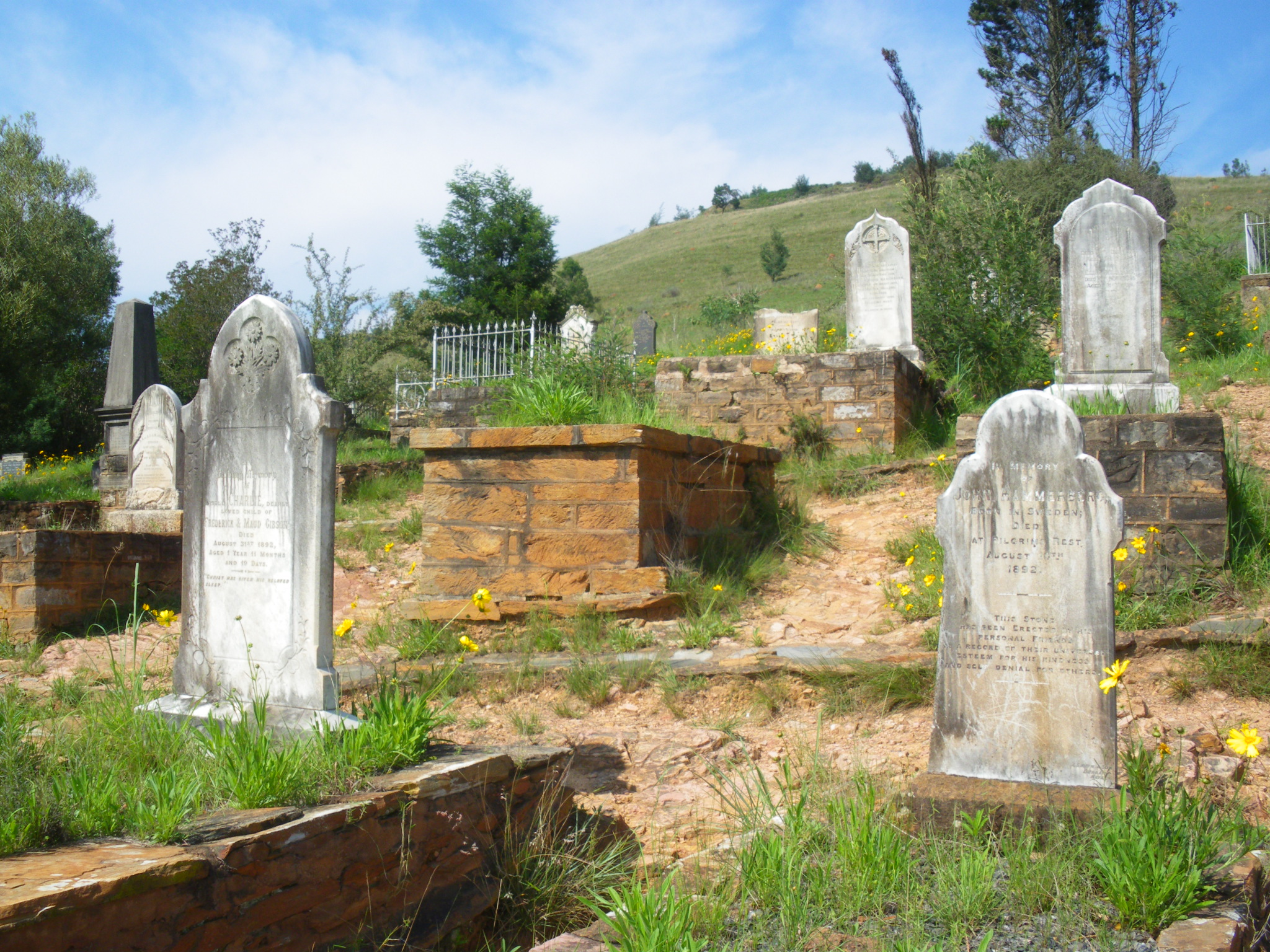
Uitlander cemetery at Pilgrim's Rest, Mpumalanga

An uitlander, Afrikaans for "foreigner" (lit. 'outlander'), was a foreign (mainly British) migrant worker during the Witwatersrand Gold Rush in the independent Transvaal Republic following the discovery of gold in 1886. The limited rights granted to this group in the independent Boer Republics was one of the contributing factors behind the Second Boer War.

== Second Boer War ==
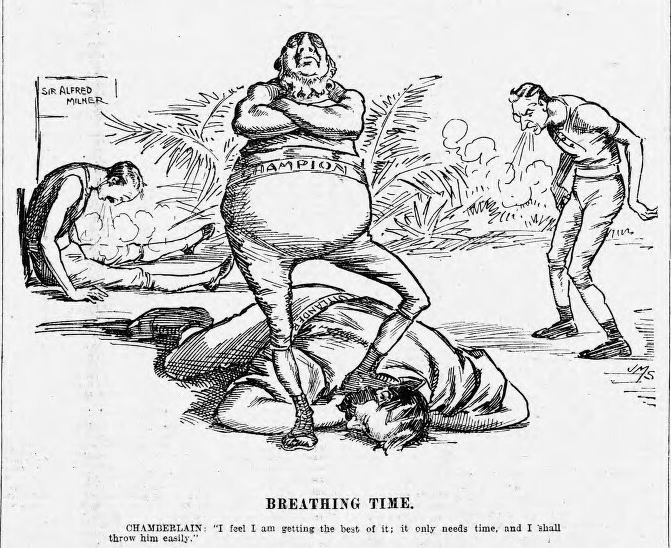
Breathing Time - JM Staniforth. The problem with "Krugerism".

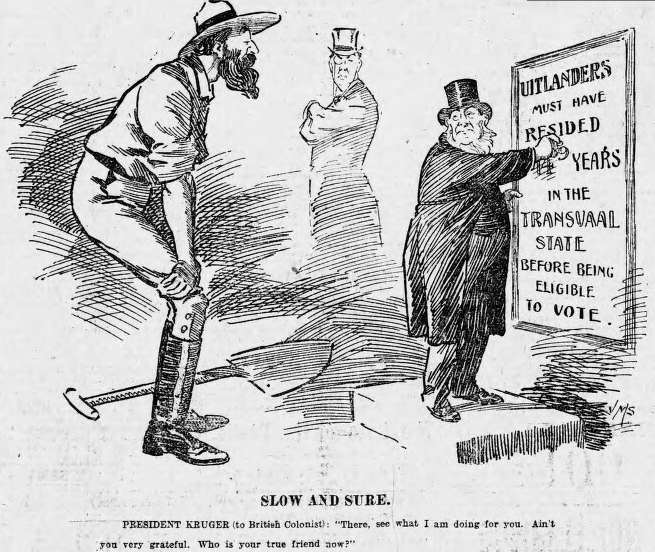
1899 political cartoon by J. M. Staniforth depicting Transvaal President Paul Kruger showing a hard line to uitlanders by reversing the residency requirement for voting rights. Colonial Secretary Joseph Chamberlain is staring at the two men with his arms crossed in the background.

The vast Witwatersrand gold fields were discovered in 1886, and within ten years the uitlander (English) population of the Transvaal was thought to be double that of the ethnic Boer Transvaalers. (Note: Estimated at ~60,000 uitlanders to ~30,000 burghers.) These workers were primarily concentrated around the Johannesburg area.

The Transvaal government, under President Paul Kruger, were concerned as to the effect this large influx could have on the independence of the Transvaal. The uitlanders were almost entirely British subjects. Therefore enfranchising the uitlanders, at a time when the Crown was keen to consolidate its colonial hold in South Africa, risked creating a powerful fifth column that could ultimately lead to a power shift and the Transvaal passing into British hands, eventually turning it into a British colony. As a result, beginning in 1890 the Transvaal government passed a series of laws refusing voting rights and citizenship to immigrants who had not both resided in the republic for fourteen years and were over forty years of age. This successfully disenfranchised the uitlanders from any meaningful political role. This attitude was called, "Krugerism".

This policy, together with high taxation, gave rise to considerable discontent. Their treatment served as the pretext for the Jameson Raid in 1895; Cecil Rhodes planned an invasion of the Transvaal to coincide with an uprising of the uitlanders in Johannesburg. Dr Jameson's force invaded, but the expected uprising never took place; the invading force were quickly overpowered and arrested.

From 1897 onwards, the High Commissioner for South Africa, Sir Alfred Milner, and the Colonial Secretary, Joseph Chamberlain, used the denial of rights to the uitlanders as their main point of attack against the Transvaal. They encouraged uitlander agitation and pressed uitlander claims, with veiled threat of war, upon Kruger's government.

In the end, British insistence and Kruger's intransigence led to the outbreak of the Second Boer War in 1899.

Upon its defeat in 1902, the Transvaal became a British colony. All residents of the Transvaal thereafter became British subjects and so the term uitlander lost prominence.

With the election of a liberal government in Britain, everything was returned to the Boers in 1906.

== See also ==
- Boerehaat

== Bibliography ==
- Marais, JS (1961). The Fall of Kruger's Republic. Clarendon Press. Archived from the original on 2012-11-02 – via Questia.
