= Equestrian statue of Philip Sheridan =

Equestrian statue of Philip Sheridan may refer to:

- Equestrian statue of Philip Sheridan (Chicago)
- Equestrian statue of Philip Sheridan (Washington, D.C.)
