= Borglum =

Borglum may refer to:

- Børglum, Danish village in Northern Jutland, formerly the location of a Catholic bishopric
  - Børglum Abbey
  - Ancient See of Børglum
- Elizabeth Borglum (1849–1922) American painter
- Gutzon Borglum (1867–1941), American sculptor, famous for creating the monumental presidents' heads at Mount Rushmore
- Lene Børglum (born 1961), Danish film producer
- Lincoln Borglum (1912–1986), American sculptor, son of Gutzon and first superintendent of Mount Rushmore National Memorial
- Solon Borglum (1868–1922), American sculptor most noted for his depiction of frontier life, brother of Gutzon and uncle of Lincoln
- Scyller Borglum, American politician
- The Bishop of Börglum and his Men (Bispen på Børglum og hans frænde), a short story, see Hans Christian Andersen bibliography
