= Bust of Abraham Lincoln (Borglum) =

Marble Sculpture in the US Capitol Building

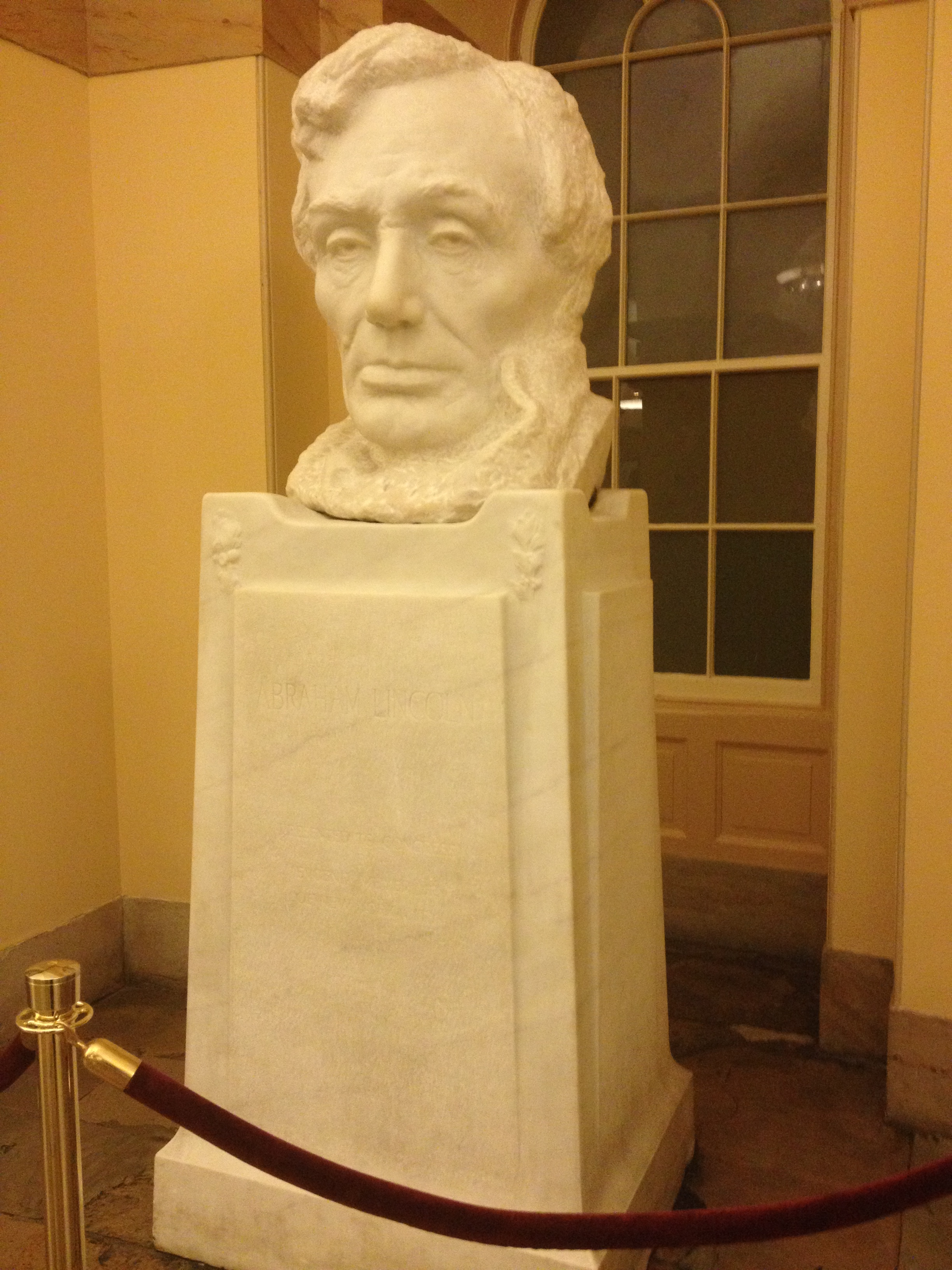
- Bust in Washington, D.C. (2013)
- Artist: Gutzon Borglum
- Year: 1908
- Subject: Abraham Lincoln
- Location: Washington, D.C., U.S.

A colossal bust of Abraham Lincoln was made by Gutzon Borglum and completed in 1908. The original marble sculpture is installed in the United States Capitol crypt, in Washington, D.C. Reproductions cast in bronze are installed in several other locations, including the Lincoln Tomb in Springfield, Illinois.

== Marble original sculpture ==
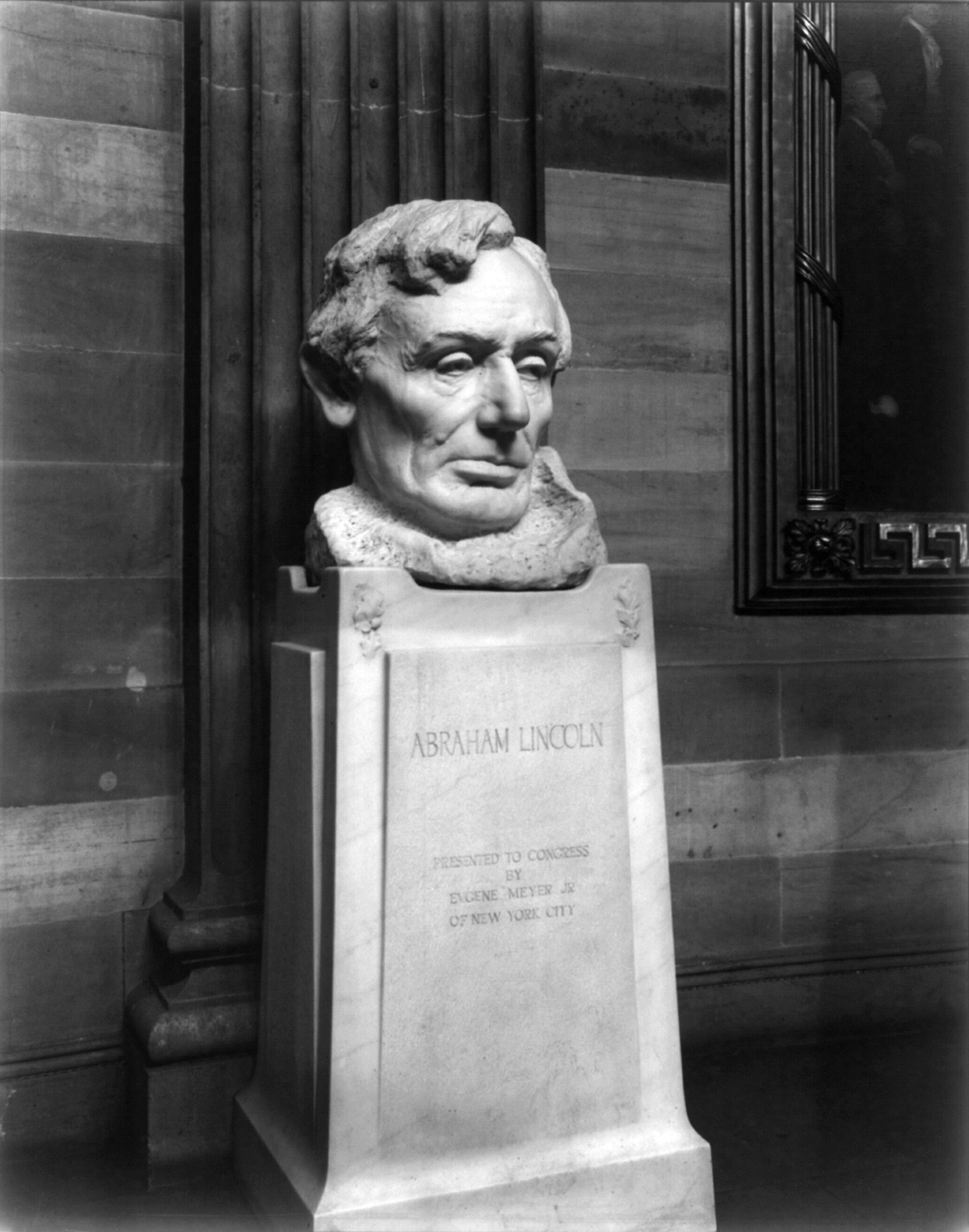
Marble bust as originally displayed in the United States Capitol rotunda until 1979

Borglum made the original bust directly from Alabama marble without a prior plaster model, based on photographs and an 1860 life mask of Lincoln's face made by Leonard Volk. The likeness was praised by Lincoln's son Robert Todd Lincoln in 1908: "I think it is the most extraordinarily good portrait of my father I have ever seen."

It stands about 40 in (100 cm) high, weighs about 375 lb (170 kg), and is signed and dated "Gutzon Borglum/1908". The distinctive face of Lincoln, without a beard, emerges from the rough rock, similar in style to sculptures by Michelangelo and Auguste Rodin, and also similar to Borglum's sculptures at Mount Rushmore, which includes a bearded Lincoln. Borglum also made a statue of Seated Lincoln, installed in Newark, New Jersey in 1911.

The sculpture was donated to Congress by the New York financier Eugene Meyer Jr., as recorded on the marble pedestal also designed by Borglum on which the bust was installed in 1911. For many decades it was displayed in United States Capitol rotunda, which still has a standing statue of Lincoln made by Vinnie Ream in 1871. The bust was moved to the crypt below in 1979.

The bust is part of the United States Capitol art collection, but it is not one of the sculptures of the National Statuary Hall Collection. Two other sculptures by Borglum are in the National Statuary Hall Collection: a statue of Alexander Hamilton Stephens and a statue of Zebulon Baird Vance.

== Bronze casts ==
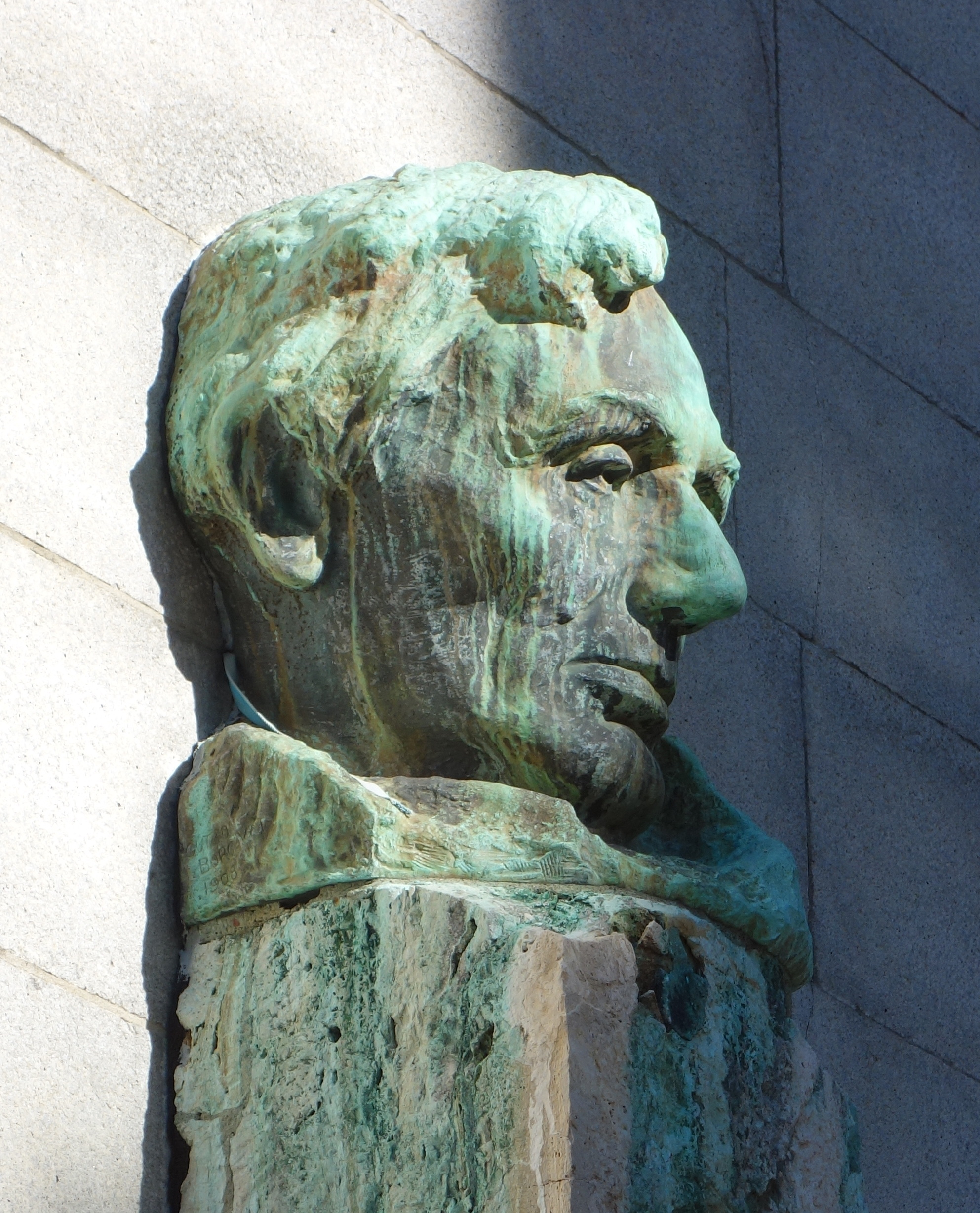
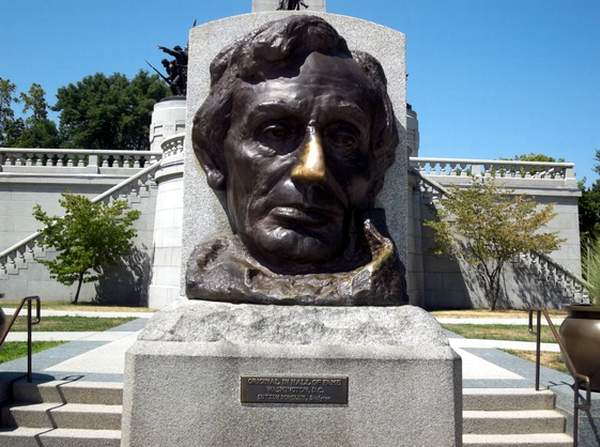
Left: Bronze bust at the Sather Tower, University of California, Berkeley; Right: Bronze bust with polished nose, at the Lincoln Tomb, Springfield, Illinois

Borglum had intended the marble bust to remain a unique work of art, but a mold was later made which was used to cast several copies in bronze. One cast stands in front of the Lincoln Tomb in Springfield, Illinois. Others are in the collections of the Chicago Historical Society, the College of the City of New York, the University of California, Berkeley, and the White House. The bust in the White House was donated by Eugene Meyer in 1954, and was usually displayed on a stone pillar in the East Garden Room, which used to link the East Wing to the Executive Residence. In 2025, prior to the destruction of the East Wing, the bust was relocated outside the Oval Office, next to the door opening on the Rose Garden. The patina has been rubbed off the noses of the busts at the Lincoln Tomb and at Shepherd Hall, CUNY, where they are often touched for good luck. An example of a 38 in (97 cm) bronze cast of Borglum's bust was sold in 2015 for $30,000.

== See also ==
- 1908 in art
- Art in the White House
