= Hugo Villa =

American sculptor

Hugo Villa (July 26, 1886 – November 4, 1948) was an American sculptor, born in Turin, Italy, and active at Mount Rushmore, working for Gutzon Borglum, and in Texas in his own studio. Before turning to sculpture, he was a violin maker who studied under Albert Moglie and completed two violins. He is buried in the San Jose Burial Park, San Antonio, Texas.

== Selected works ==
- Texas Memorial to Honored Dead, 1931 (Austin, Texas)
- The Evolution of a Great State, 1938 (Austin, Texas)
- German Pioneers of Texas Monument, 1938 (New Braunfels, Texas)
