= William Dempster Hoard Sculpture =

Bronze sculpture by Gutzon Borglum

William Dempster Hoard monument
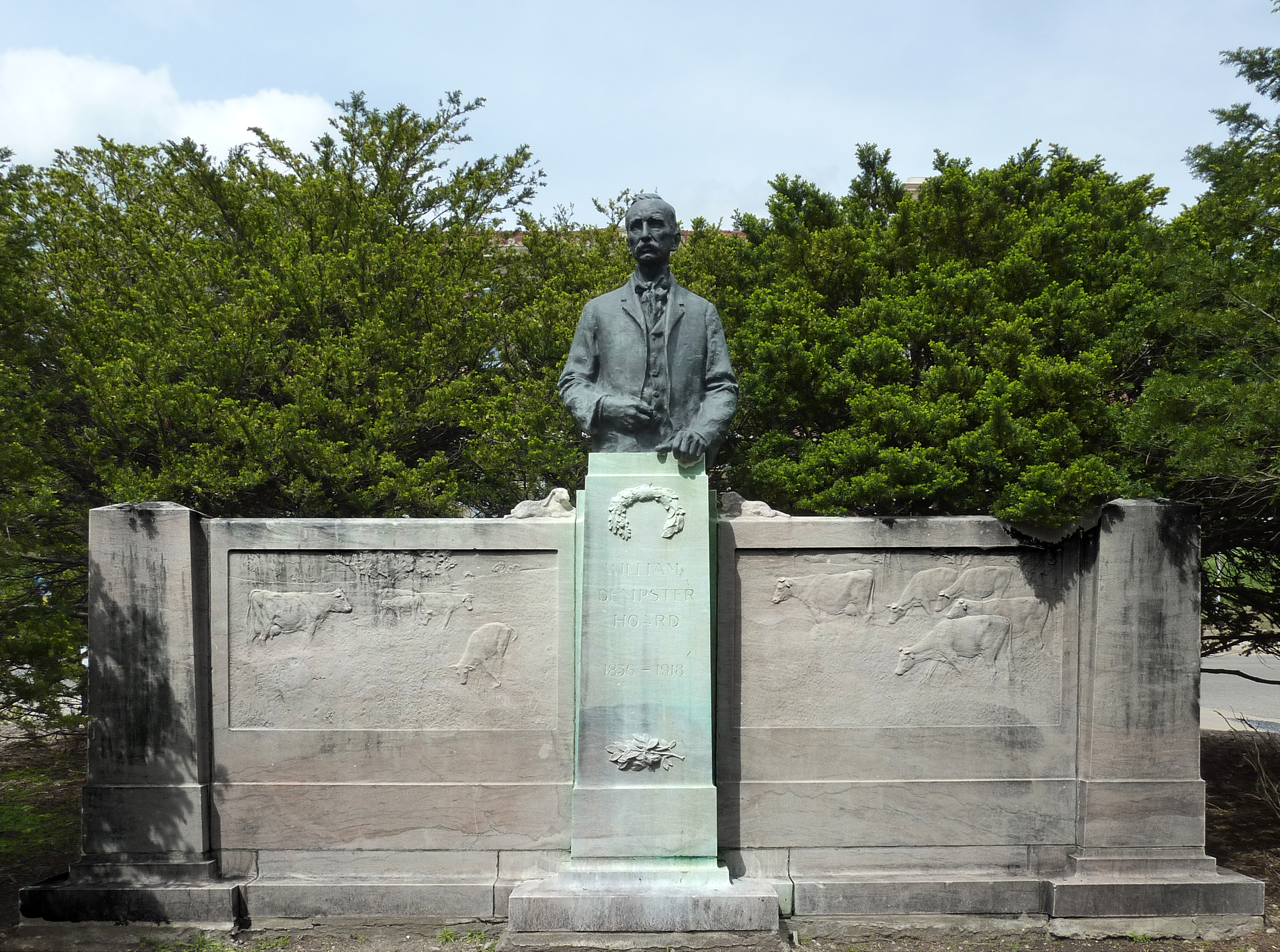
- Artist: Gutzon Borglum
- Completion date: 1922
- Medium: Bronze; Marble
- Location: Madison, Wisconsin
- 43.075556°N 89.41°W
- Owner: University of Wisconsin–Madison

William Dempster Hoard Sculpture is a bronze sculpture of former Wisconsin Governor William D. Hoard. The sculpture was created in 1922 by American sculptor Gutzon Borglum.

== History ==
The sculpture is bronze and it was created in 1922 by Gutzon Borglum. It is located on the University of Wisconsin–Madison's campus in front of Agricultural Hall.

The sculpture was created to honor Dempster's contribution to agriculture and was erected four years after his death. The plaster mold which was used to cast the bronze is part of a permanent display at the Hoard Museum in Fort Atkinson, Wisconsin.

The sculpture is cast in bronze and it sits atop a marble base. It was unveiled on February 3, 1922. In 1922 the dedication ceremony for the sculpture attracted 8,000 people. The cost of the sculpture was $16,000. The money to purchase the sculpture came from donations which were made to the Hoard Testimonial Fund.
