= The Aviator (Charlottesville, Virginia) =

Sculpture on the campus of the University of Virginia, USA

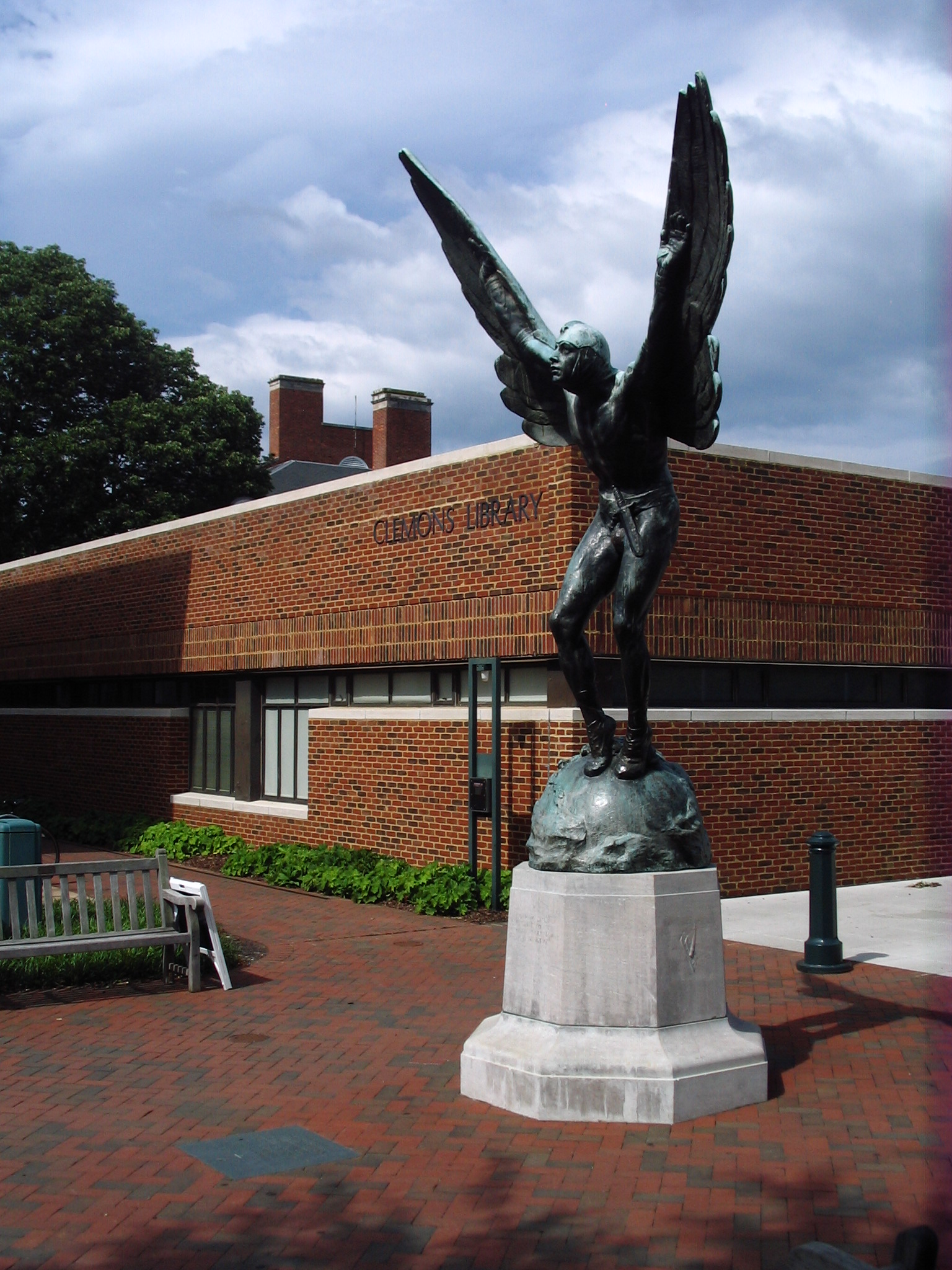
- Artist: Gutzon Borglum
- Year: 1918
- Type: Bronze
- Dimensions: 4,400 cm × 3,400 cm (144 ft × 112 ft)
- Location: Charlottesville, Virginia
- Owner: University of Virginia
- The Aviator
- U.S. National Register of Historic Places
- Virginia Landmarks Register
- Location within Virginia Location within the United States
- Location: Monument Square, bounded by University and Jefferson Park Aves. and the railroad tracks, Charlottesville, Virginia
- Coordinates: 38°2′18″N 78°30′21″W
- Area: less than one acre
- Built: 1919
- Architect: Borglum, Gutzon
- Architectural style: Late 19th And 20th Century Revivals
- NRHP reference No.: 06000758
- VLR No.: 002-5073

Significant dates
- Added to NRHP: November 9, 2006
- Designated VLR: June 8, 2006

The Aviator is a historical sculpture located on the University of Virginia campus near Charlottesville, Albemarle County, Virginia.

== History ==
The sculpture is a bronze statue commissioned in honor of University alumnus, James Rogers McConnell’s heroism and courage in World War I, as a member of the Lafayette Escadrille.

The Aviator was designed by Gutzon Borglum and dedicated in 1919. The sculpture measures 12 feet high and 8 feet, 6 inches wide.

It is located in front of Clemons Library on the grounds of the University of Virginia. Due to the library's abundant 24-hour study space available for students, The Aviator is a fixture in everyday life at the University.

It is an athletic male nude with his feet placed shoulder width apart, knees slightly bent and arms outstretched supporting a pair of wings. The blade/knife; dirk or possible dagger/stiletto the figure has in his sheath is a recognized symbol of masculinity and of a warrior.

It was added to the National Register of Historic Places in 2006.

== Gallery ==
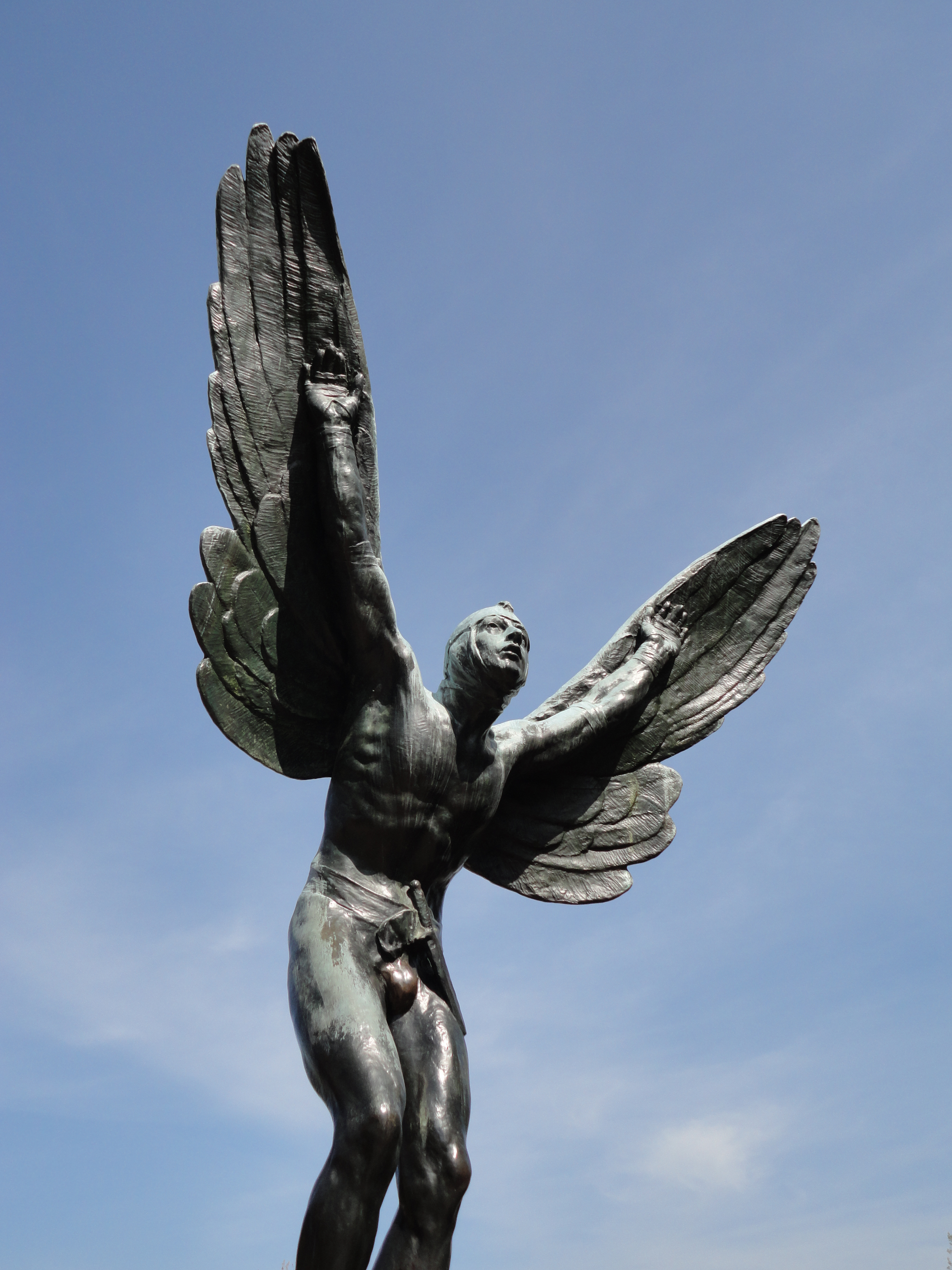
The Aviator, April 2013

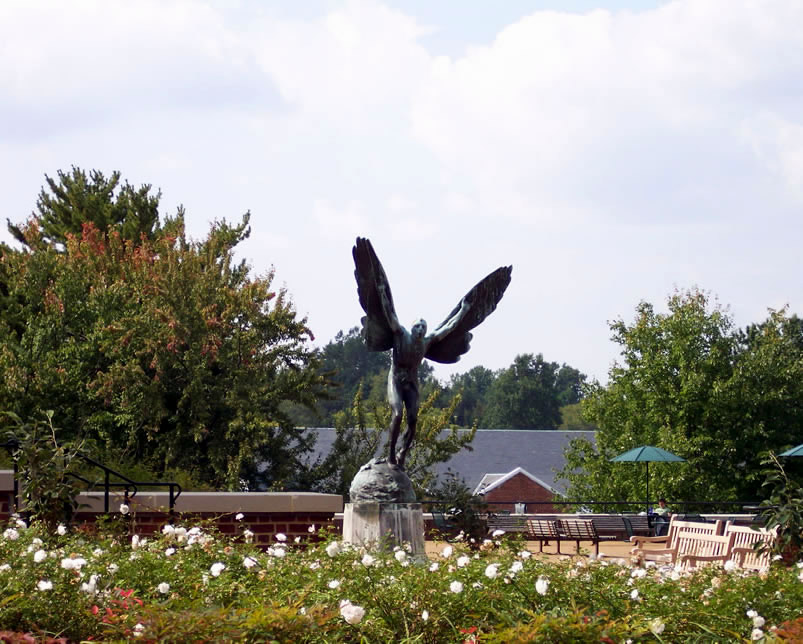
The Aviator, December 2005

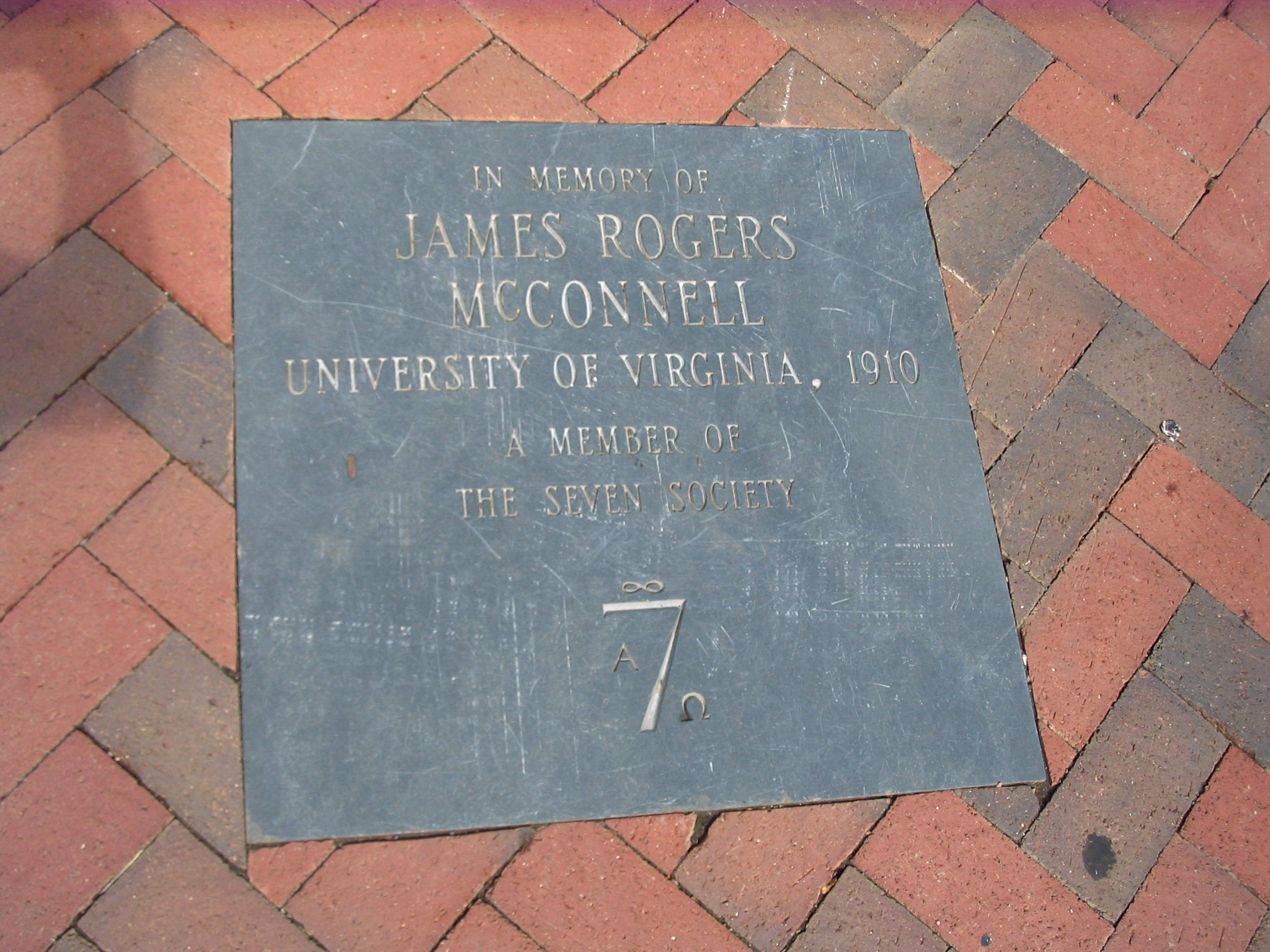
The Seven Society inscription

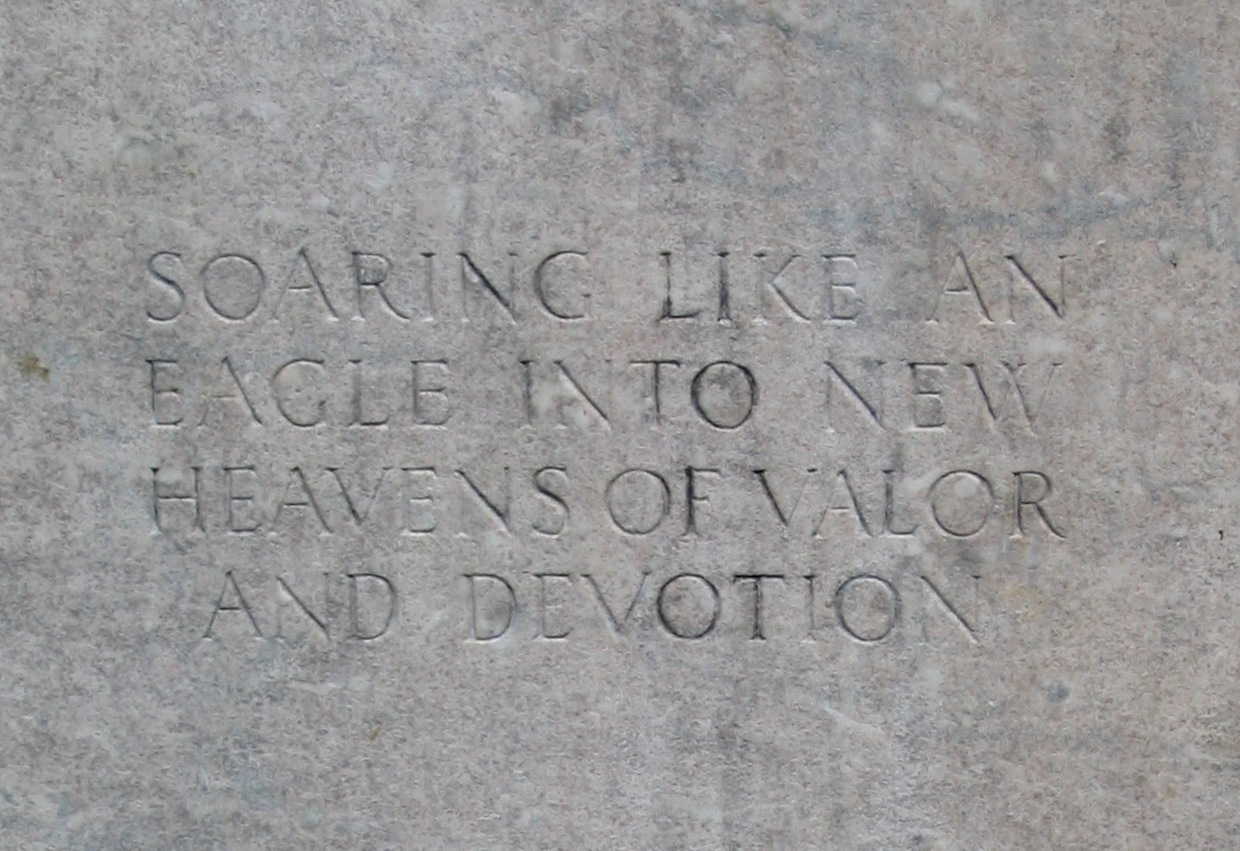
Inscription
