= Equestrian statue of Philip Sheridan (Washington, D.C.) =

Bronze sculpture by Gutzon Borglum

General Philip Sheridan
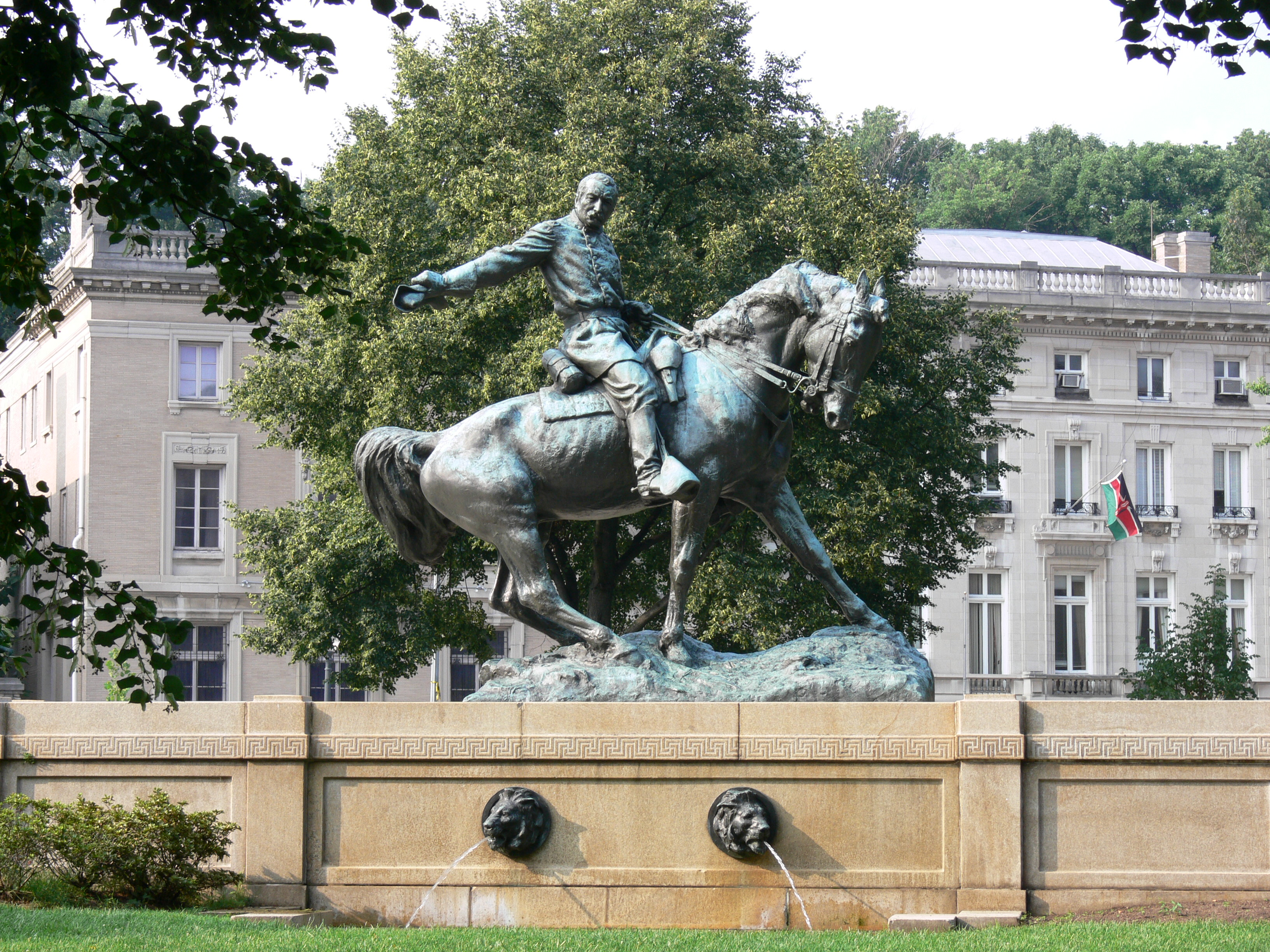
- Interactive map of General Philip Sheridan
- Location: Sheridan Circle, Washington, D.C., United States
- Coordinates: 38°54′43.8″N 77°03′02.4″W
- Equestrian statue of Philip Sheridan
- U.S. National Register of Historic Places
- U.S. Historic district – Contributing property
- Part of: Civil War Monuments in Washington, D.C.
- NRHP reference No.: 78000257
- Added to NRHP: September 20, 1978
- Designer: Gutzon Borglum (sculptor); Henry Winslow (architect)
- Material: Bronze (sculpture); Granite (base)
- Length: 12 feet (3.7 m)
- Width: 5 feet (1.5 m)
- Height: 10 feet (3.0 m)
- Opening date: November 25, 1908
- Dedicated to: Philip Sheridan

General Philip Sheridan is a bronze sculpture that honors Civil War general Philip Sheridan. The monument was sculpted by Gutzon Borglum, best known for his design of Mount Rushmore. Dedicated in 1908, dignitaries in attendance at the unveiling ceremony included President Theodore Roosevelt, members of the President's cabinet, high-ranking military officers and veterans from the Civil War and Spanish–American War. The equestrian statue is located in the center of Sheridan Circle in the Sheridan-Kalorama neighborhood of Washington, D.C. The bronze statue, surrounded by a plaza and park, is one of eighteen Civil War monuments in Washington, D.C., which were collectively listed on the National Register of Historic Places in 1978. The sculpture and surrounding park are owned and maintained by the National Park Service, a federal agency of the Interior Department.

== History ==
=== Background ===
Philip Sheridan was a career United States Army officer who was instrumental in securing Union successes during the Valley Campaigns of 1864, most notably the Battle of Cedar Creek. Many of the Union generals would eventually be memorialized in Washington, D.C., with statues spread throughout the city. While looking at one of his comrade's equestrian sculptures, Sheridan was not impressed with the depiction of the man and horse. He reportedly told his wife "Whatever you do after I'm gone, don't put me on a horse like that." Following her husband's death in 1888, when an equestrian sculpture of her husband was being planned, Irene Sheridan insisted the horse be as "proud and courageous as its rider."

On March 2, 1889, Congress authorized the erection of a memorial to Sheridan and appropriated $50,000 for its construction. The original sculptor chosen to complete the project was Sheridan's friend John Quincy Adams Ward, who had completed other works in Washington, D.C., including Major General George Henry Thomas and the James A. Garfield Monument. Ward signed a contract with the Sheridan monument commission in 1892 which called for the equestrian statue to be completed by 1898. He submitted a sketch of the model in 1892, but that design was not approved. Not only did Ward not complete the work by 1898, he had only completed a life-size study of Sheridan's head by 1903. Ward finally completed a model of Sheridan, but when Irene and her son, Philip Sheridan Jr., visited Ward's studio in New York City to see the model, they both hated it. He was depicted as a stout older officer atop a stilted horse. The commission eventually cancelled the contract with Ward in 1905. His model of Sheridan was eventually cast in 1916 and stands in front of the New York State Capitol.

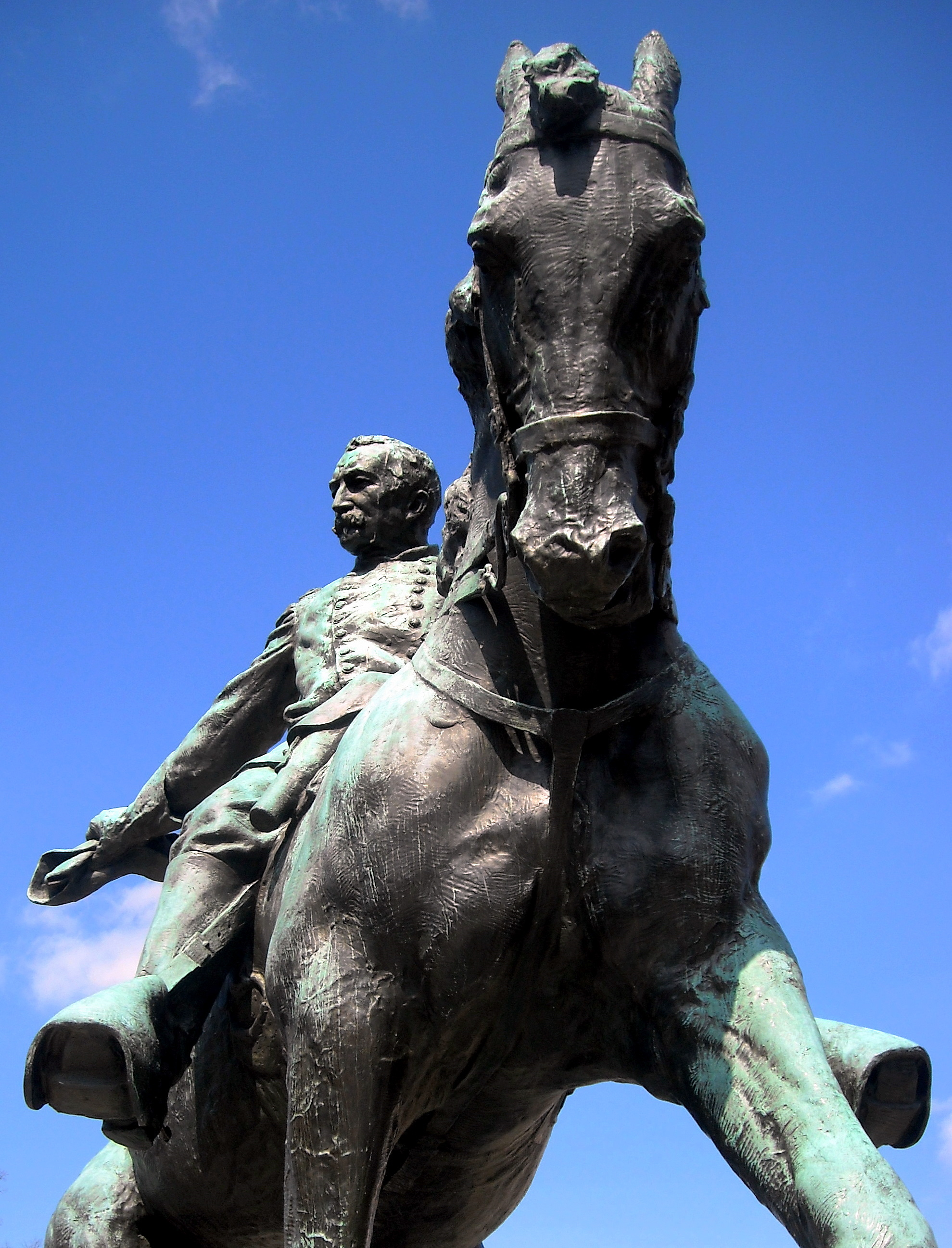
Closeup of the statue

Gutzon Borglum had closely followed the events surrounding Ward's procrastination and firing as the two men had an argumentative past. Borglum was convinced he could do a better job with the design and he also needed the money. He set out to study as much as possible about Sheridan's life by reading his memoirs and biographies. Borglum was able to secure an invitation to a Washington, D.C. party that Irene attended. He sat next to her and invited Irene to his studio in New York. Borglum set out models of horses throughout the studio before she arrived and surprised Irene by how much he know about her husband. At the behest of Irene, on July 2, 1907, Borglum received a contract to sculpt the memorial. He was a Danish American artist who was greatly influenced by French sculptor Auguste Rodin. Borglum is best known for his carvings at Mount Rushmore and Stone Mountain. The Sheridan sculpture is his only equestrian monument in Washington, D.C. Borglum's other works in Washington, D.C., include Rabboni at Rock Creek Cemetery and several statues in the National Statuary Hall Collection in the United States Capitol.

On January 17, 1908, Borglum's design received approval by the Sheridan monument commission, including then-Secretary of War William Howard Taft, General Henry C. Corbin, and Brigadier General Michael V. Sheridan, Philip Sheridan's brother. Irene also approved the design and chose the memorial site.

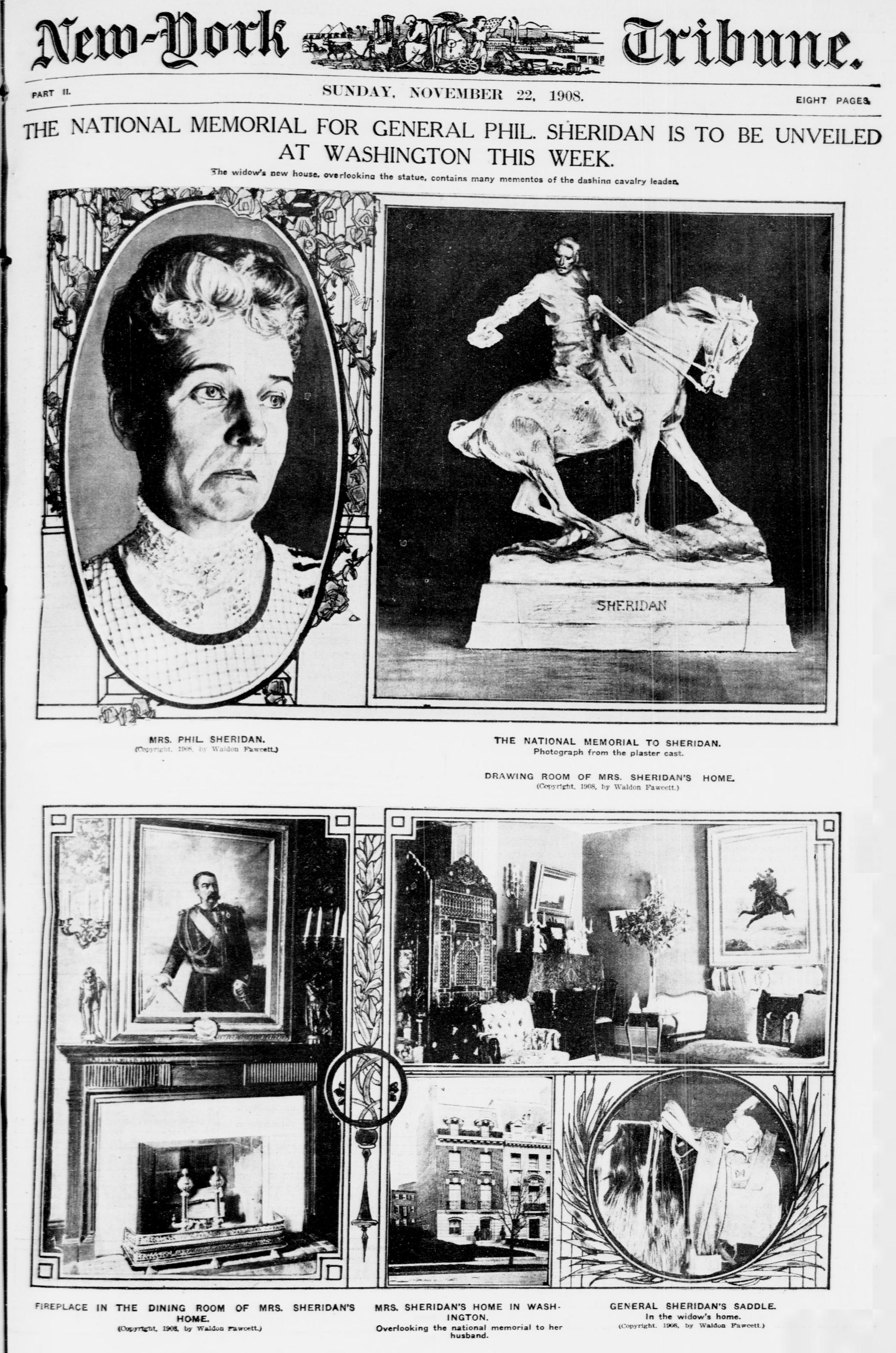
Illustrated supplement in the New-York Tribune announcing the dedication of the General Sheridan monument. November 22, 1908.

She lived at 2211 Massachusetts Avenue NW (currently offices for the Embassy of Greece), a short distance from Sheridan Circle and the sculpture. As Borglum worked on the sculpture, he would talk to Sheridan's friends, sketch Sheridan's artifacts, and visit Irene. Since Philip Jr. bore a very close resemblance to his father, Borglum used him as a model for the sculpture. When the artwork was completed, Irene, Philip Jr., and Sheridan's three daughters loved the finished result. The sculpture depicts Sheridan riding his horse, Rienzi, as he assembles his troops during the Battle of Cedar Creek on October 19, 1864. He had raced 20 miles (32 km) from Winchester, Virginia, to reach the battle. Following the Union victory, Sheridan renamed the horse Winchester. After Winchester died in 1878, Sheridan had him preserved and mounted. The horse is now on display at the National Museum of American History. Congress paid for the plaza, base, and preparation of the memorial site, while veterans of the Army of the Cumberland paid for the statue. Architect Henry Winslow designed the base and setting. The stonework was provided by the Mohegan Granite Company of New York while the Malnati Stone Company of Washington, D.C. set the stones in place.

=== Dedication ===
The Sheridan memorial was dedicated on November 25, 1908. A large crowd was present with many dignitaries in attendance, including President Theodore Roosevelt, military officers, diplomats, and veterans of the Civil War and Spanish–American War. A processions of troops led by Brigadier General J. Franklin Bell paraded past the crowd and dignitaries while the United States Marine Band played music. Secretary of War Luke E. Wright presided over the dedication ceremony and Denis J. O'Connell, rector of The Catholic University of America, delivered the invocation. Roosevelt, Brigadier General Horace Porter, and Wright gave eulogies of Sheridan. Roosevelt gave a short speech praising Sheridan's valiant acts while Porter's speech was an in depth review of Sheridan's life, including his days at West Point and his campaigns during the Civil War and American Indian Wars. After Irene and Philip Jr. removed the covering of the statue, the crowd cheered loudly and many began to recite Thomas Buchanan Read's poem, Sheridan's Ride.

=== Historic designation ===
Along with seventeen other Civil War monuments, General Philip Sheridan was added to the National Register of Historic Places (NRHP) on September 20, 1978, and the District of Columbia Inventory of Historic Sites on March 3, 1979. The Sheridan monument is also designated a contributing property to the Massachusetts Avenue Historic District, listed on the NRHP in 1974, and the Sheridan-Kalorama Historic District, listed on the NRHP in 1989. The sculpture and the surrounding park are owned and maintained by the National Park Service, a federal agency of the Interior Department.

== Design and location ==
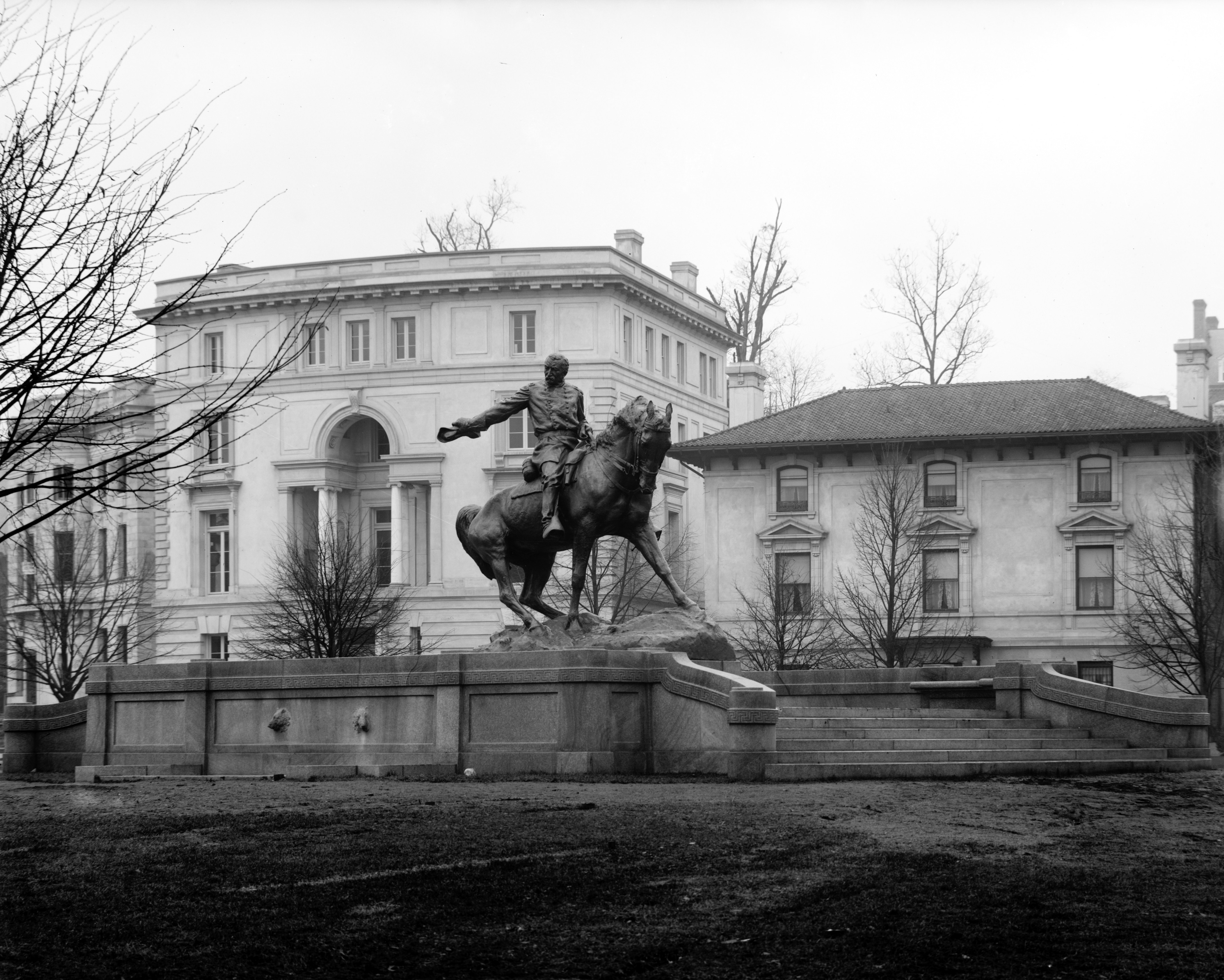
The Sheridan memorial in 1916

The bronze equestrian sculpture is at the center of Sheridan Circle, a traffic circle located at the intersection of 23rd Street, R Street and Massachusetts Avenue NW within the Embassy Row section of the Sheridan-Kalorama neighborhood. It measures 10 feet (3.0 m) high and 12 feet (3.7 m) long while the rectangular granite base measures 3 feet (0.91 m) high. The horse is slightly reared back while standing on a rocky surface. Sheridan is turned to his right with his right arm extended behind him. The right hand is holding his hat while his left hand holds the horse's reins. Sheridan is wearing a military uniform with a long coat belted at the waist and is portrayed with a moustache and wavy hair. The sculpture is surrounded by a plaza measuring 37 feet (11 m) long with five steps on the front and back leading to the sculpture. Curved benches run along the interior of the plaza facing the sculpture while the exterior of the plaza features two pairs of lion head fountain spouts. Water poured from the spouts into square basins, but this feature is no longer working.

Inscriptions on the monument include the following:

- GUTZON BORGLUM 1908 (left side of the sculpture)
- GORHAM CO FOUNDERS (right side of the sculpture near the base)
- SHERIDAN (front side of the base)

== See also ==
- List of equestrian statues in the United States
- List of public art in Washington, D.C., Ward 2
- Outdoor sculpture in Washington, D.C.
