= Statue of Zebulon Baird Vance =

Statue in the U.S. Capitol

Zebulon Baird Vance
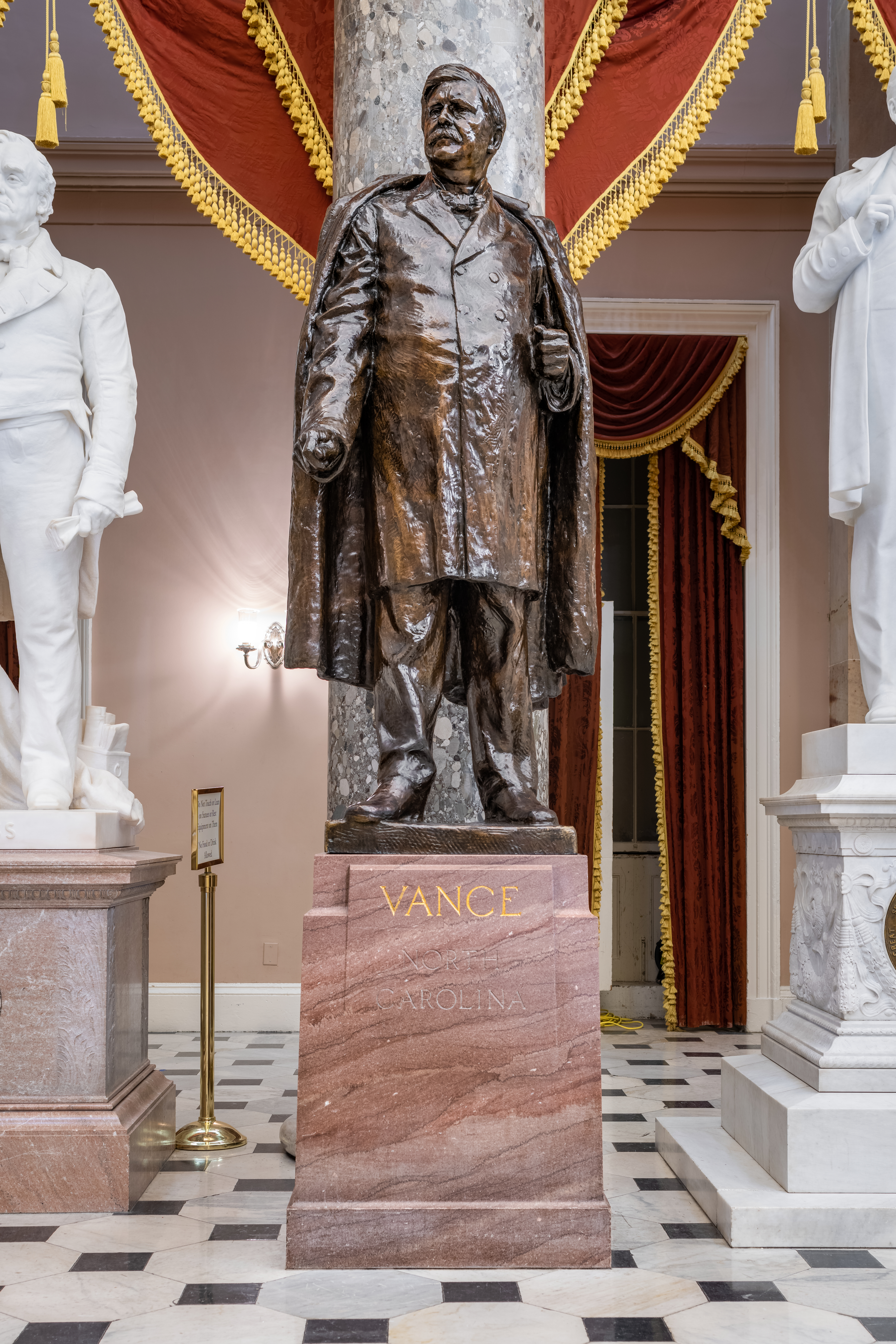
- The statue in the National Statuary Hall in 2023
- Artist: Gutzon Borglum
- Medium: Bronze sculpture
- Subject: Zebulon Baird Vance
- Location: Washington, D.C., United States

Zebulon Baird Vance is a bronze sculpture commemorating the Confederate colonel and governor of the same name by Gutzon Borglum, installed in the United States Capitol as part of the National Statuary Hall Collection. The statue was donated to the collection by the state of North Carolina, and was accepted by the Senate on 22 June 1916.

== See also ==
- 1916 in art
- List of Confederate monuments and memorials
