= Elizabeth Borglum =

American painter (1848–1922)

- Born: Elizabeth Putnam Jaynes; December 21, 1848; Racine, Wisconsin, U.S.
- Died: March 21, 1922 (aged 73); Venice, Los Angeles, California, U.S.
- Other names: Elizabeth Putnam Janes; Lisa Borglum
- Occupations: Painter; teacher
- Spouse: Gutzon Borglum (divorced)

Elizabeth "Lisa" Borglum (née Elizabeth Putnam Jaynes; December 21, 1848 – March 21, 1922) was an American painter.

== Early life and education ==
Borglum was born to Isaac and Julia Nelson Collins Janes on December 21, 1848, in Racine, Wisconsin. Early on, she attended school in Boston.

In 1875, Borglum attended Miss Graham's School in New York, studying music, and studying art under Charles W. Knudsen. She specialized in still life paintings. In 1881, Borglum taught music in Milwaukee, then moved to San Francisco and began studying art under William Keith.

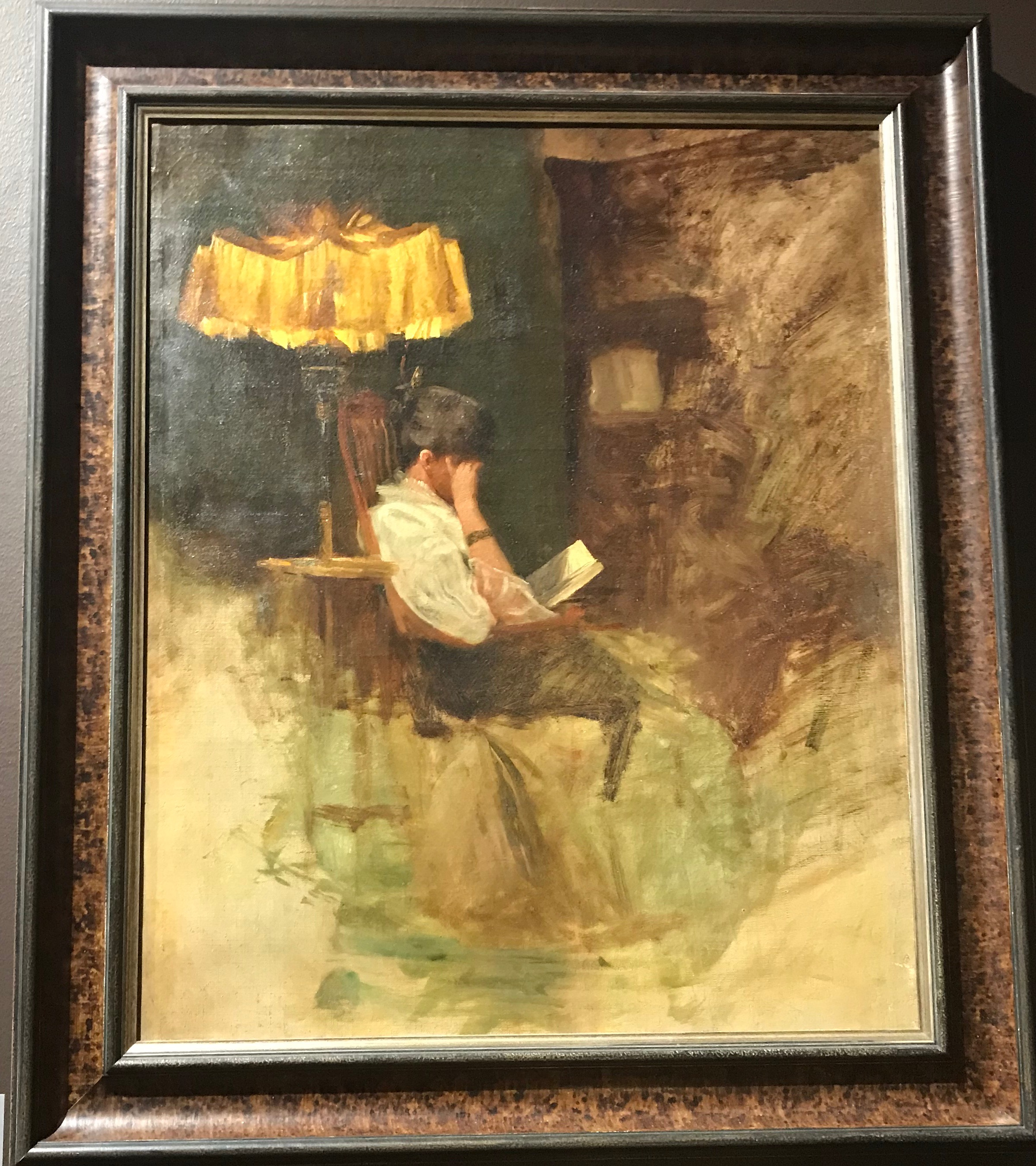
Untitled--Woman Reading circa 1915 by Elizabeth Borglum

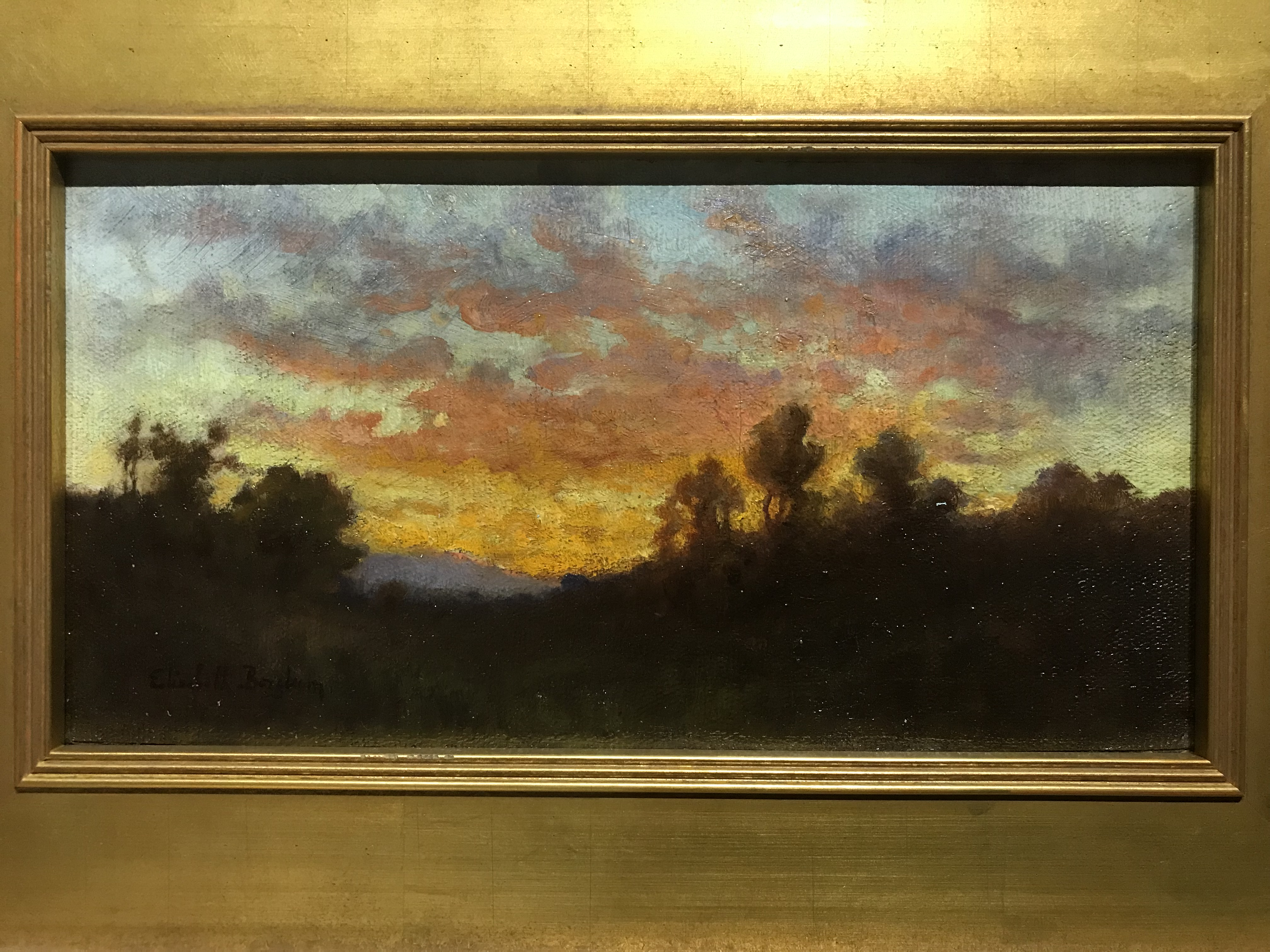
Untitled--Sunset circa 1890 by Elizabeth Borglum

== Career ==
After she was married, Borglum and her husband traveled, studied, and exhibited in Europe. They then settled at a home called El Rosario in Sierra Madre, California, a base from which they continued their travels and from which Borglum continued her art practice and her teaching.

== Personal life and death ==
Borglum started teaching Gutzon Borglum, another visual artist who was 20 years her junior. They eventually married. John would go on to work on sculpting Mount Rushmore. The couple divorced in 1908.

Borglum died in Venice, Los Angeles, California, on March 21, 1922.
