= Equestrian statue of Philip Sheridan (Chicago) =

Statue in Chicago, Illinois, U.S.

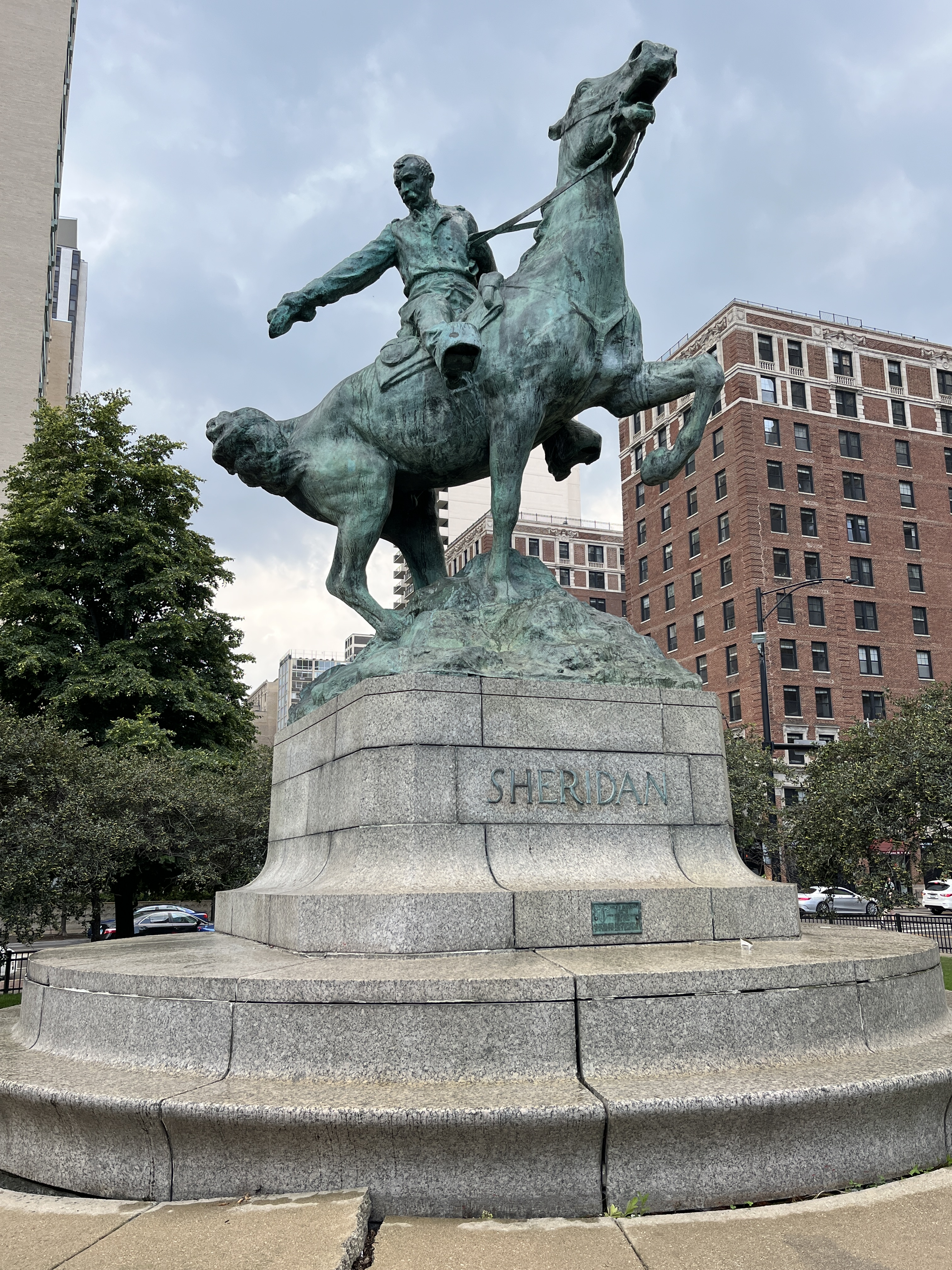
- The statue in 2023
- Location: 41°56′25.7″N 87°38′21.3″W

An equestrian statue of Philip Sheridan by Gutzon Borglum, sometimes called the General Philip Henry Sheridan Monument, is installed in Chicago, in the U.S. state of Illinois.

== History ==
The sculpture was installed in 1923. It was vandalized in 2020.

== See also ==
- List of equestrian statues in the United States
