= Rabboni (sculpture) =

Sculpture by Gutzon Borglum

- Ffoulke Memorial, Rabboni-Ffoulke Memorial
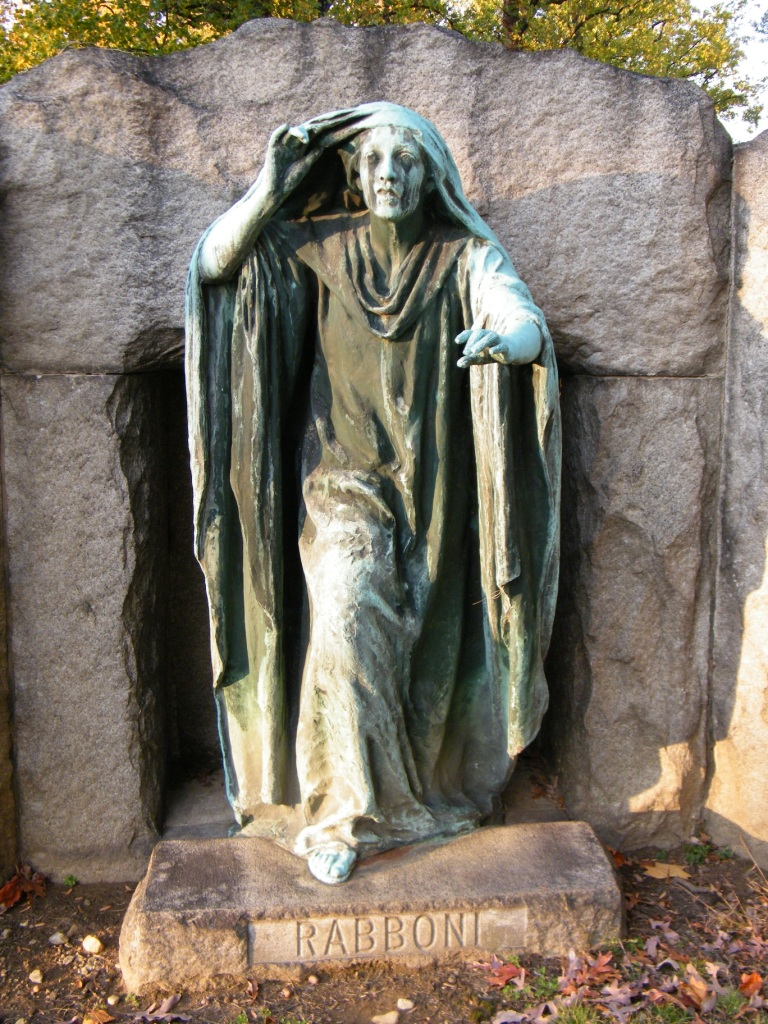
- Artist: Gutzon Borglum
- Year: 1909
- Type: Bronze sculpture
- Dimensions: 190 cm × 94 cm × 94 cm (75 in × 37 in × 37 in)
- Location: Washington, D.C., United States; 38°56′54.1″N 77°0′40.24″W
- Owner: Rock Creek Cemetery

Rabboni is a public artwork by American artist Gutzon Borglum, located Rock Creek Cemetery in Washington, D.C., United States. Rabboni was surveyed as part of the Smithsonian Save Outdoor Sculpture! survey in 1993. It is a tribute to Charles Matthews Ffoulke, prominent Washington banker and tapestry collector.

== Description ==
This Realist sculpture depicts Mary Magdalene emerging from an alcove consisting of three granite blocks that surround her. Dressed in long robes and a cape which covers her head, her proper right hand is raised to lift the cape from her head. Her proper left arm is extended outward in front of her. Her proper right leg is stepping forward, to recognize Jesus Christ has risen from his tomb on Easter.

The lower right of the sculpture is signed: Gutzon Borglum Sc / Gorham Co.

The front of the sculptures base is inscribed: RABBONI

On the back of the center granite piece is an upper bronze plaque which is inscribed:

THE END OF BIRTH IS DEATH
THE END OF DEATH IS LIFE AND
WHERFOR MOURNEST THOU

A lower bronze plaque is inscribed:

IN MEMORY OF
Charles Mather Ffoulke
1841–1909
Sarah Cushing
His Wife
1852–1926
AND THEIR CHILDREN
HORACE CUSHING FFOULKE
1876–1903
GWENDOLINE FFOULKE
CHARLES MATHER FFOULKE II
1889–1912
AND
HORACE CUSHING
BELOVED FATHER OF SARAH CUSHING
1819–1865

== Gallery ==
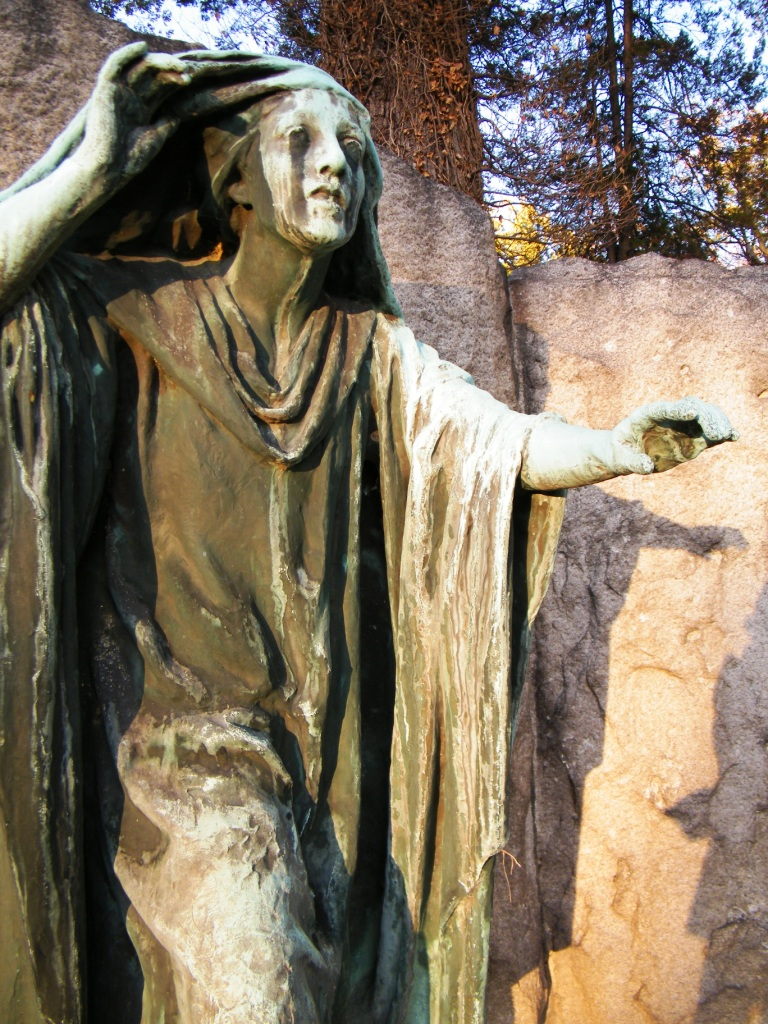
Detail

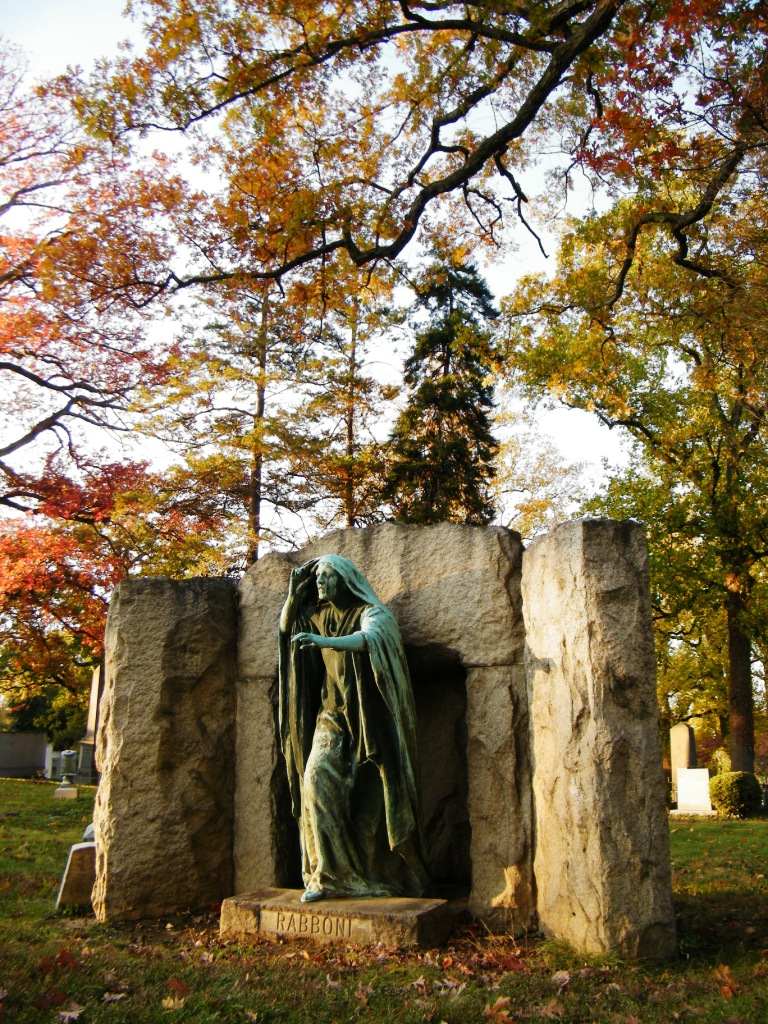
Front

== Information ==
The title of this piece, Rabboni, is traditionally spelled "Rabbouni", which is Aramaic in origin [similar to Hebrew form of "rabbi"]. Upon seeing the resurrected Christ, Magdalene calls him "Rabbouni," per this Bible passage:

John 20:16

"Jesus saith unto her, Mary. She turned herself, and saith unto him, Rabbouni; which is to say, dear Master". (KJV)

Actress Edith Wynne Matthison was the model for the statue.
