= Gutzon Borglum =

American sculptor (1867–1941)

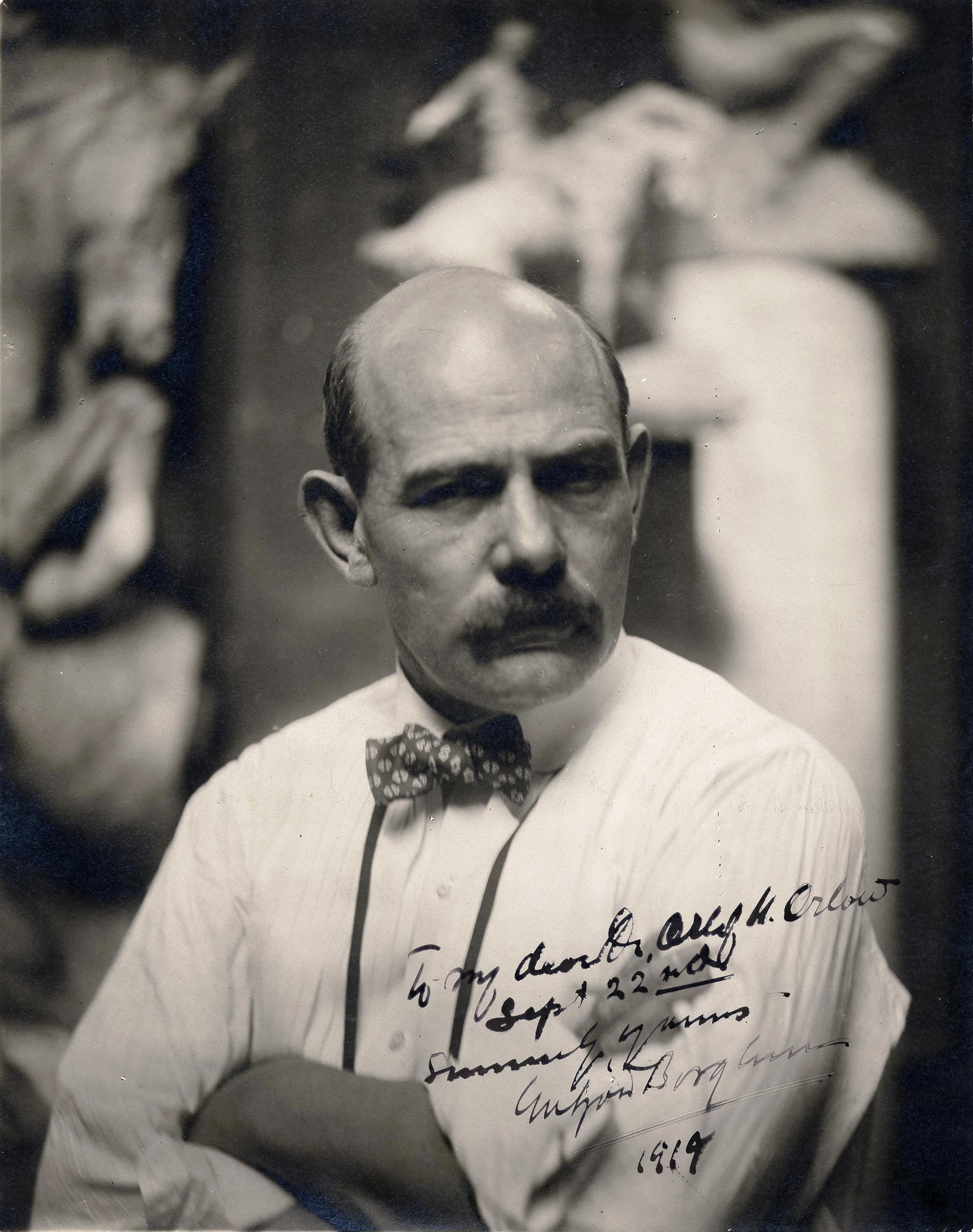
- Borglum in 1919
- Born: John Gutzon de la Mothe Borglum; March 25, 1867; St. Charles, Idaho Territory, U.S.
- Died: March 6, 1941 (aged 73); Chicago, Illinois, U.S.
- Resting place: Forest Lawn Memorial Park
- Education: Mark Hopkins; Institute of Art; Académie Julian; École des Beaux-Arts; California School of Design
- Known for: Sculpture, painting
- Notable work: Mount Rushmore; Stone Mountain
- Movement: Bull Moose Party
- Spouse: Elizabeth "Lisa" Putnam Janes (m. 1889) Mary Williams (m. 1909)
- Children: 3, including Lincoln

John Gutzon de la Mothe Borglum (March 25, 1867 – March 6, 1941) was an American sculptor best known for his work on Mount Rushmore. He is also associated with various other public works of art across the U.S., including Stone Mountain in Georgia, statues of Union General Philip Sheridan in Washington, D.C., and in Chicago, as well as a bust of Abraham Lincoln exhibited in the White House by Theodore Roosevelt and now held in the United States Capitol crypt in Washington, D.C.

== Early life ==
The son of Danish immigrants, John Gutzon de la Mothe Borglum was born in 1867 in St. Charles, in what was then thought to be in Utah but was later determined to be in Idaho Territory. Borglum was a child of Mormon polygamy. His father, Jens Møller Haugaard Børglum (1839–1909), came from the village of Børglum in northwestern Denmark. He had two wives when he lived in Idaho: Gutzon's mother, Christina Mikkelsen Børglum (1847–1871), and her sister Ida, who was Jens's first wife.

Jens Borglum decided to leave the LDS Church and moved to Omaha, Nebraska, where polygamy was both illegal and taboo. Jens Borglum had worked mainly as a woodcarver before his decision to attend the Saint Louis Homeopathic Medical College in St. Louis, Missouri. At this point "Jens and Christina divorced, the family left the LDS church, and Jens, Ida, their children, and Christina's two sons, Gutzon and Solon, moved to St. Louis, where Jens earned a medical degree." Upon his graduation from the Missouri Medical College in 1874, Dr. Borglum moved the family to Fremont, Nebraska, where he established a medical practice. Gutzon Borglum remained in Fremont until 1882, when his father enrolled him in St. Mary's College, Kansas.

After a brief stint at Saint Mary's College, Gutzon Borglum moved to Omaha, Nebraska, where he apprenticed in a machine shop and graduated from Creighton Preparatory School.

== New York City ==
In New York City, he sculpted saints and apostles for the new Cathedral of St. John the Divine in 1901; in 1906 he had a group sculpture accepted by the Metropolitan Museum of Art—the first sculpture by a living American the museum had ever purchased—and made his presence further felt with some portraits. He also won the Logan Medal of the Arts. His reputation soon surpassed that of his younger brother Solon Borglum, already an established sculptor.

== Family ==
In 1889, Borglum married his painting instructor, Elizabeth Putnam Janes, who was 18 years his senior. After divorcing his first wife, Borglum married Mary Montgomery Williams, on May 20, 1909, with whom he had three children, including a son, Lincoln, and a daughter, Mary Ellis (Mel) Borglum Vhay.

== Commissioned to design David Livingstone Centenary medal ==
According to the American Geographical Society website, "The David Livingstone Centenary Medal was founded at the initiative of the Hispanic Society of America in March 1913". The site goes on to state "Gutzon Borglum, the sculptor of Mt. Rushmore, was the designer of this unusually beautiful example of medallic art." The same website page notes that Theodore Roosevelt was awarded the medal in 1917.

== Public life ==
Borglum was active in the committee that organized the New York Armory Show of 1913, the birthplace of modernism in American art. By the time the show was ready to open, however, Borglum had resigned from the committee, feeling that the emphasis on avant-garde works had co-opted the original premise of the show and made traditional artists like himself look provincial. He moved into an estate in Stamford, Connecticut, in 1914 and lived there for 10 years. He sheltered Czechoslovak Legion members on his land at Stamford in 1917.

Borglum was an active member of the Ancient Free and Accepted Masons (the Freemasons), raised in Howard Lodge #35, New York City, on June 10, 1904, and serving as its Worshipful Master 1910–11. In 1915, he was appointed Grand Representative of the Grand Lodge of Denmark near the Grand Lodge of New York. He received his Scottish Rite Degrees in the New York City Consistory on October 25, 1907. He was friends with Theodore Roosevelt for many years and during the 1912 United States presidential election Borglum was a very active campaign organizer and member of the Bull Moose Party.

While it has been claimed that Borglum was a member of the Ku Klux Klan, an article in the Smithsonian Magazine denies that there is proof that he officially joined the KKK. That said, he became "deeply involved in Klan politics", attending Klan rallies and serving on Klan committees. In 1925, having only completed the head of Robert E. Lee, Borglum was dismissed from the Stone Mountain project, with some holding that it came about due to infighting within the KKK, with Borglum involved in the strife. Later, he stated "I am not a member of the Kloncilium, nor a knight of the KKK", but Howard Shaff and Audrey Karl Shaff claim that "that was for public consumption". The museum at Mount Rushmore displays a letter to Borglum from D. C. Stephenson, the infamous Klan Grand Dragon who later was convicted of the rape and murder of Madge Oberholtzer. The 8 in × 10 in (20 cm × 25 cm) portrait contains the inscription "To my good friend Gutzon Borglum, with the greatest respect." Correspondence from Borglum to Stephenson during the 1920s detailed a deep racist conviction in Nordic moral superiority and strict immigration policies.

== Monuments ==
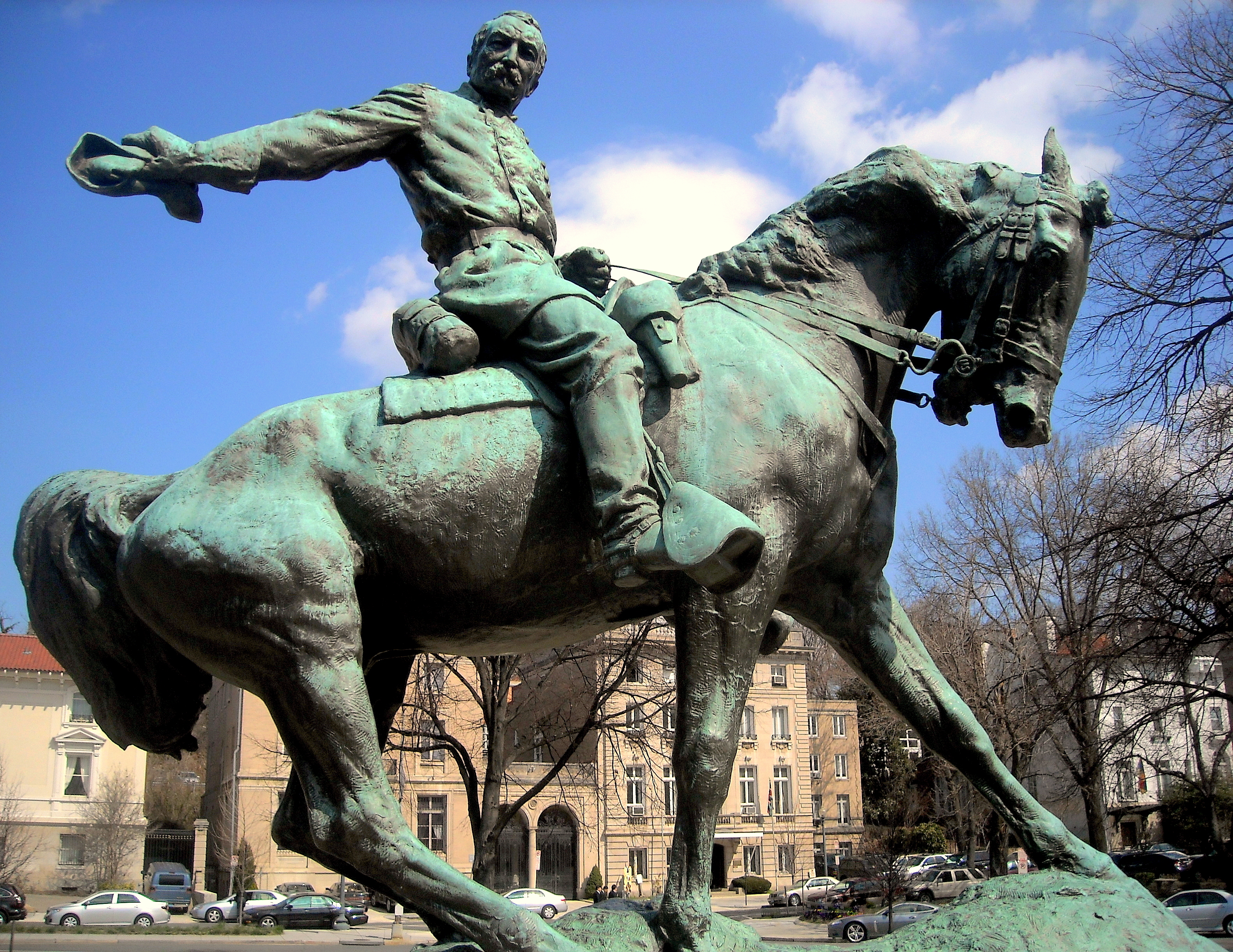
General Philip Sheridan, sculpted by Borglum in 1908, in Washington, D.C.

A fascination with gigantic scale and themes of heroic nationalism suited his extroverted personality. His head of Abraham Lincoln, carved from a six-ton block of marble, was exhibited in Theodore Roosevelt's White House and can be found in the United States Capitol Crypt in Washington, D.C. A "patriot", believing that the "monuments we have built are not our own", he looked to create art that was "American, drawn from American sources, memorializing American achievement", according to a 1908 interview. Borglum was highly suited to the competitive environment surrounding the contracts for public buildings and monuments, and his public sculptures are found all around the United States.

In 1908, Borglum won a competition for an equestrian statue of the Civil War General Philip Sheridan to be placed in Sheridan Circle in Washington, D.C. A second version of General Philip Sheridan was erected in Chicago, Illinois, in 1923. Winning this competition was a personal triumph for him because he won out over sculptor J. Q. A. Ward, a much older and more established artist and one whom Borglum had clashed with earlier in regard to the National Sculpture Society. At the unveiling of the Sheridan statue, one observer, President Theodore Roosevelt (whom Borglum was later to include in the Mount Rushmore portrait group), declared that it was "first rate"; a critic wrote that "as a sculptor Gutzon Borglum was no longer a rumor, he was a fact".

President Franklin D. Roosevelt delivered an address on May 3, 1934, dedicating a statue of William Jennings Bryan created by Borglum. This Bryan statue by Borglum originally stood in Washington, D.C., but was later displaced by highway construction and moved by an Act of Congress in 1961 to Salem, Illinois, Bryan's birthplace.

In 1925, Borglum moved to Texas, where he created a model for a monument to trail drivers and became involved in several civic and artistic projects. Financial delays postponed the monument’s casting until 1940 at a reduced scale. During his time in Texas he also proposed a redevelopment plan for the Corpus Christi waterfront, promoted local beautification efforts, and attracted both support and criticism for his modernizing views.

=== Stone Mountain ===
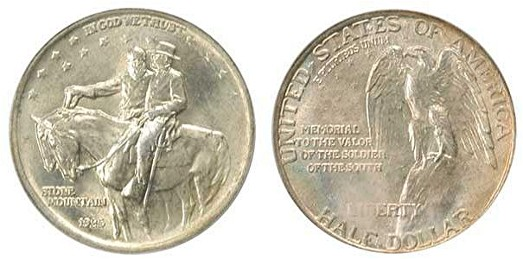
Stone Mountain Memorial half dollar, 1925 (design by Borglum)

Borglum was initially involved in the carving of Stone Mountain in Georgia. Borglum's nativist stances made him seem an ideologically sympathetic choice to carve a memorial to heroes of the Confederate States of America, planned for Stone Mountain, Georgia. In 1915, coinciding with the Klan-glorifying, highly successful The Birth of a Nation, he was approached by the United Daughters of the Confederacy with a project for sculpting a 20-foot (6 m) high bust of General Robert E. Lee on the mountain's 800-foot (240 m) rockface. Borglum accepted, but told the committee, "Ladies, a twenty-foot head of Lee on that mountainside would look like a postage stamp on a barn door."

Borglum's ideas eventually evolved into a high relief frieze of Lee, Jefferson Davis, and Stonewall Jackson riding around the mountain, followed by a legion of artillery troops. Borglum agreed to include a Ku Klux Klan altar in his plans for the memorial to acknowledge a request of Helen Plane in 1915, who wrote to him: "I feel it is due to the KKK that saved us from Negro domination and carpetbag rule, that it be immortalized on Stone Mountain".

After a delay caused by World War I, Borglum and the newly chartered Stone Mountain Confederate Monumental Association set to work on this monument, the largest ever attempted. Many difficulties slowed progress, some because of the sheer scale involved. After finishing the detailed model of the carving, Borglum was unable to trace the figures onto the massive area on which he was working, until he developed a gigantic magic lantern to project the image onto the side of the mountain.

Carving officially began on June 23, 1923, with Borglum making the first cut. At Stone Mountain he developed sympathetic connections with the reorganized Ku Klux Klan, who were major financial backers of the monument. Lee's head was unveiled on Lee's birthday January 19, 1924, to a large crowd, but soon thereafter Borglum was increasingly at odds with the officials of the organization. His domineering, perfectionist, authoritarian manner brought tensions to such a point that in March 1925 Borglum smashed his clay and plaster models. He left Georgia permanently, his tenure with the organization over. None of his work remains, as it was all blasted off the mountain's face for the work of Borglum's replacement Henry Augustus Lukeman. In his abortive attempt, however, Borglum had developed the necessary techniques for sculpting on a gigantic scale that made Mount Rushmore possible.

=== Mount Rushmore ===
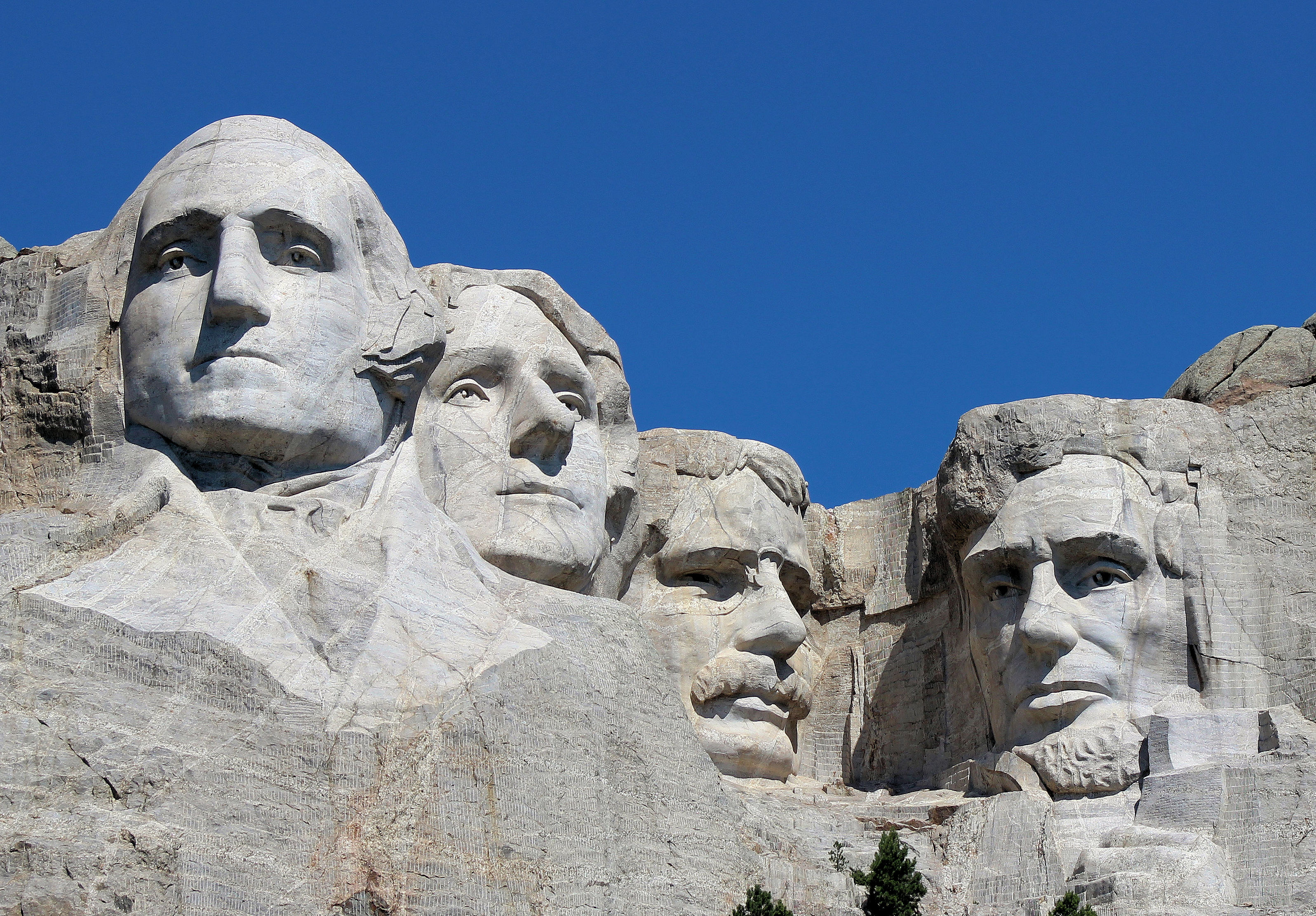
Mount Rushmore, located in the Black Hills of South Dakota

His Mount Rushmore project, 1927–1941, was the brainchild of South Dakota state historian Doane Robinson. His first attempt with the face of Thomas Jefferson had to be redone when it was determined that there was not enough stone to complete it. Dynamite was used to remove large areas of rock from under Washington's brow. The initial pair of presidents, George Washington and Thomas Jefferson, was soon joined by Abraham Lincoln and Theodore Roosevelt.

Ivan Houser, father of John Sherrill Houser, was assistant sculptor to Gutzon Borglum in the early years of carving; he began working with Borglum shortly after the inception of the monument and was with Borglum for a total of seven years. When Houser left Gutzon to devote his talents to his own work, Gutzon's son, Lincoln, took over as assistant sculptor to his father.

Borglum alternated exhausting on-site supervising with world tours, raising money, polishing his personal legend, sculpting a Thomas Paine memorial for Paris and a Woodrow Wilson memorial for Poznań, Poland (1931). In his absence, work at Mount Rushmore was overseen by Bill Tallman and later his son, Lincoln Borglum. During the Rushmore project, father and son were residents of Beeville, Texas. When he died in Chicago, following complications of surgery, his son finished another season at Rushmore, but left the monument largely in the state of completion it had reached under his father's direction.

=== Other works ===
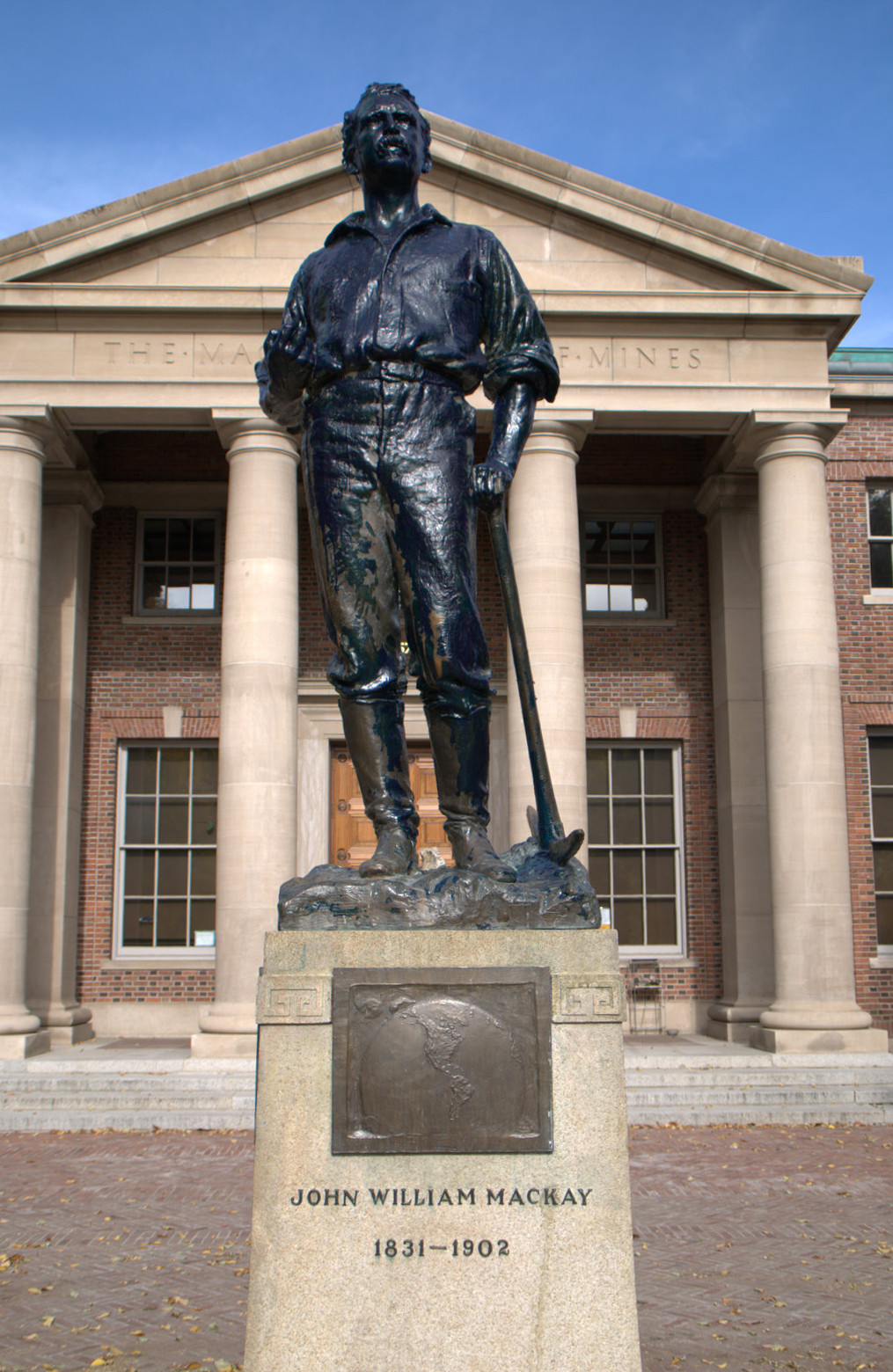
Statue of Comstock Lode silver baron John William Mackay (1831–1902), Mackay School of Earth Sciences and Engineering, University of Nevada, Reno (1908)

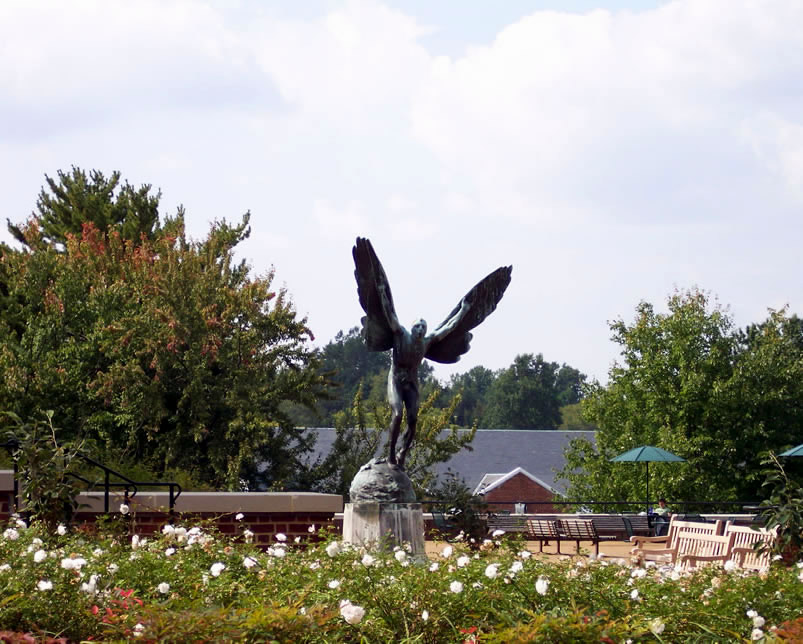
Aviator, Borglum, 1919, University of Virginia

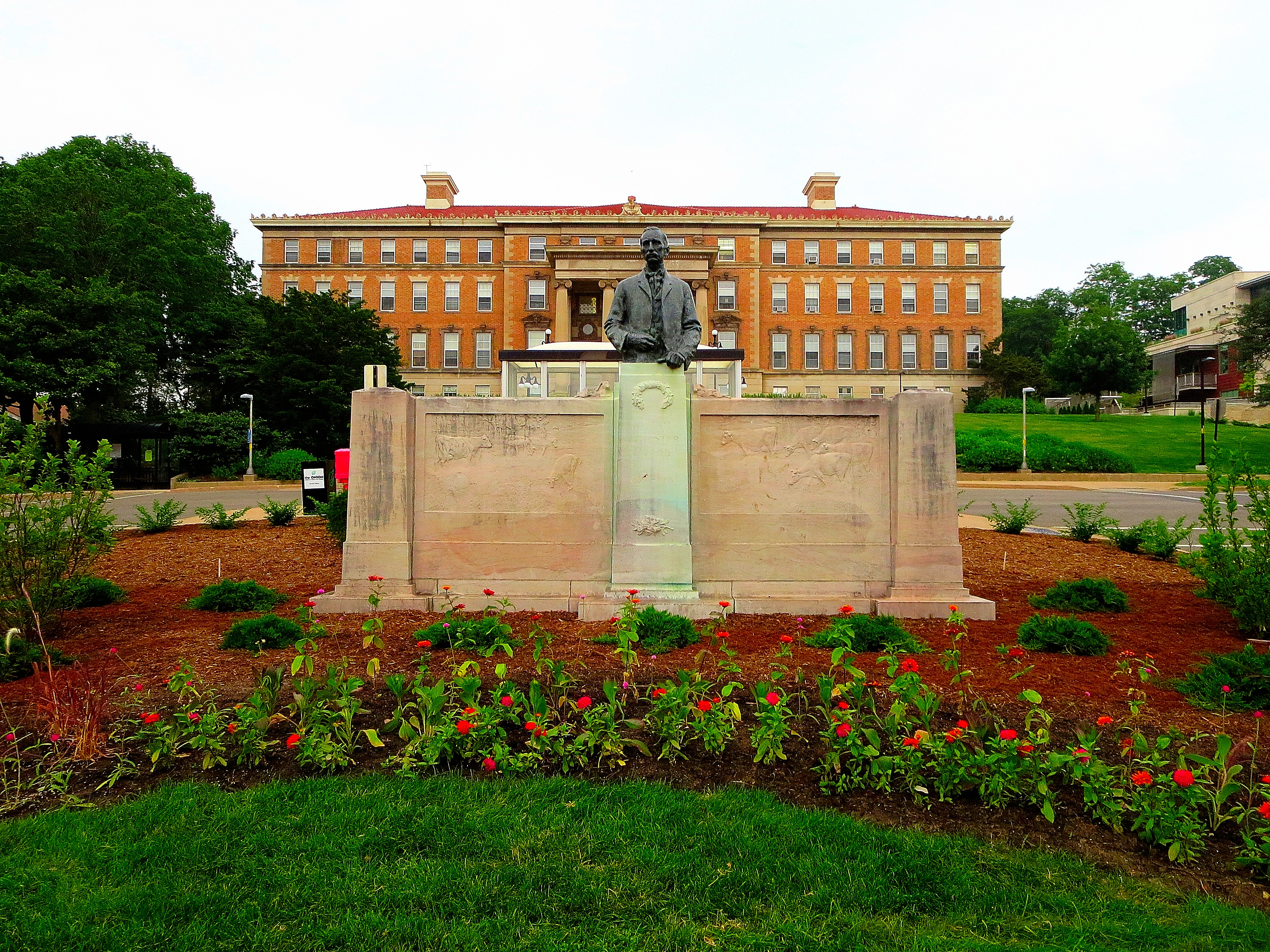
William Dempster Hoard Sculpture in Henry Mall in front of Agriculture Hall, University of Wisconsin-Madison (1922)

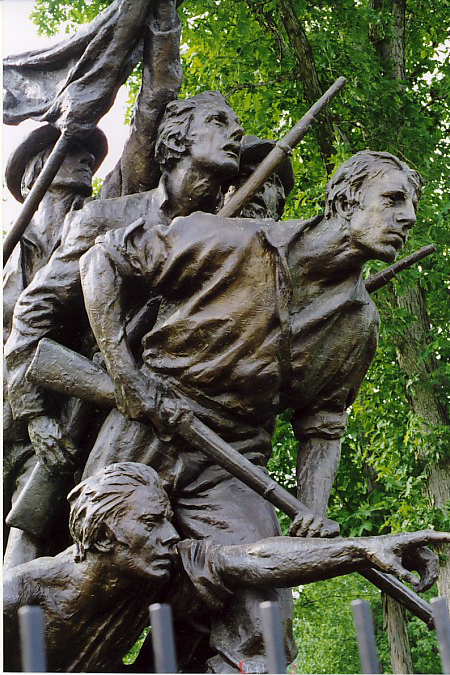
North Carolinian soldiers at the Battle of Gettysburg

In 1909, the sculpture Rabboni was created as a grave site for the Ffoulke Family in Washington, D.C., at Rock Creek Cemetery.

Four public works by Borglum are in Newark, New Jersey: Seated Lincoln (1911), Indian and the Puritan (1916), Wars of America (1926), and a stele with bas-relief, First Landing Party of the Founders of Newark (1916). No other U.S. city holds as many public displays by Borglum.

In 1912, the Nathaniel Wheeler Memorial Fountain, designed by Borglum, was dedicated in Bridgeport, Connecticut.

A memorial to Robert Louis Stevenson at Baker Cottage, Saranac Lake, New York, was unveiled in 1915.

In 1916, he overhauled the design of the torch for the Statue of Liberty in New York City.

In 1918, he was one of the drafters of the Czechoslovak declaration of independence.

One of Borglum's more unusual pieces is The Aviator, completed in 1919 as a memorial for James Rogers McConnell, who was killed in World War I while flying for the Lafayette Escadrille. It is located on the grounds of the University of Virginia in Charlottesville, Virginia.

In 1922, he crafted the William Dempster Hoard Sculpture in the north end what is now the Henry Mall Historic District at the University of Wisconsin-Madison.

His statue of Collis P. Huntington was completed in 1924 and stands at the entrance of the CSX Huntington headquarters building located in the 900 block of Seventh Avenue, Huntington, West Virginia.

His statue of Harvey W. Scott was completed in 1933 and stood at the peak of Mount Tabor, Portland, Oregon, until it was toppled by protestors in 2020.

Borglum sculpted the Memorial to the "Start Westward of the United States", which is located in Muskingum Park, Marietta, Ohio (1938). The work was featured on a 1938 3¢ US postage stamp.

He built the statue of Daniel Butterfield at Sakura Park in Manhattan (1918).

He created a memorial to Sacco and Vanzetti (1928), a plaster cast of which is now in the Boston Public Library.

Another Borglum design is the North Carolina Monument on Seminary Ridge at the Gettysburg Battlefield in south-central Pennsylvania. The cast bronze sculpture depicts a wounded Confederate officer encouraging his men to push forward during Pickett's Charge. Borglum had also made arrangements for an airplane to fly over the monument during the dedication ceremony on July 3, 1929. During the sculpture's unveiling, the plane scattered roses across the field as a salute to those North Carolinians who had fought and died at Gettysburg.

In 1939 when German troops marched into Poland, they destroyed Borglum's statue of Woodrow Wilson located in Poznań.

== Death ==
While visiting Chicago in 1941 to give a talk, Borglum began feeling ill and underwent routine prostate surgery. However, blood clots resulting from the surgery led to a series of heart attacks, with the final one resulting in his death on March 6. He was initially buried in a Chicago cemetery, with plans to later reinter his body elsewhere. The Rushmore Commission recommended that his body be interred in a specially constructed tomb at Mount Rushmore. However, there was no approval for his wife to be buried alongside him there, and several years after his death, his body was interred at its final resting place at Forest Lawn Memorial Park in Glendale, California.

His son Lincoln Borglum completed the Mount Rushmore memorial and served as the memorial's first superintendent.

== Publications ==
- Borglum, Gutzon (June 1914). "Art That Is Real And American: Why We Should Create Our Own Art out Of Our Own National History Instead Of Imitating The Work That Properly Expressed The Triumphs Of Greece And Rome". The World's Work: A History of Our Time. XLIV (2): 200–215.

== Gallery ==
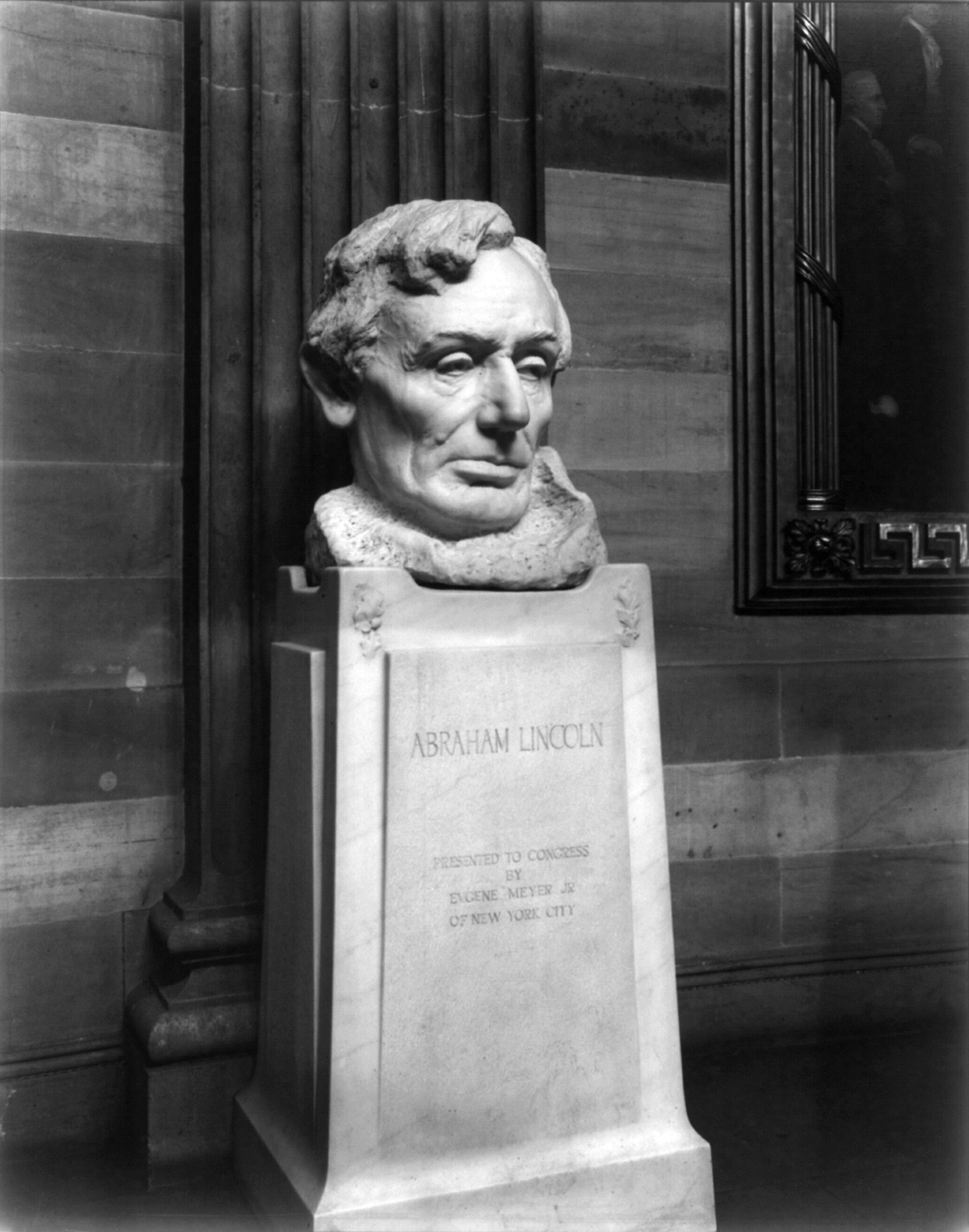
Bust of Abraham Lincoln, Crypt of the U.S. Capitol (1908)

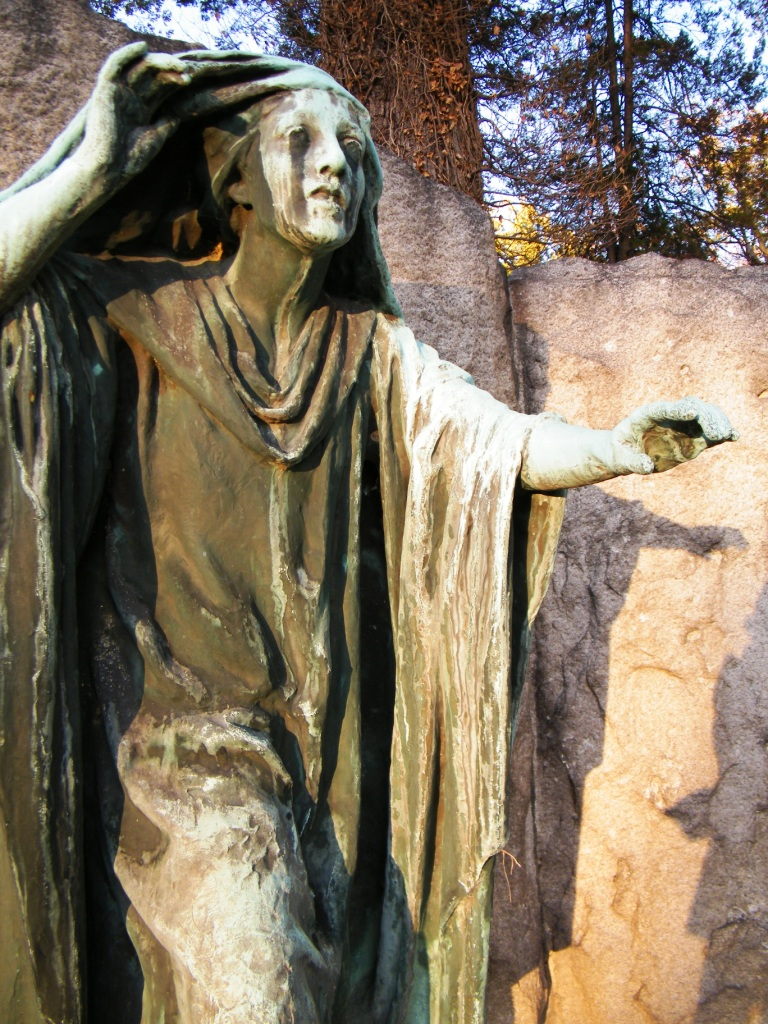
Rabboni, Rock Creek Cemetery, Washington, D.C. (1909)

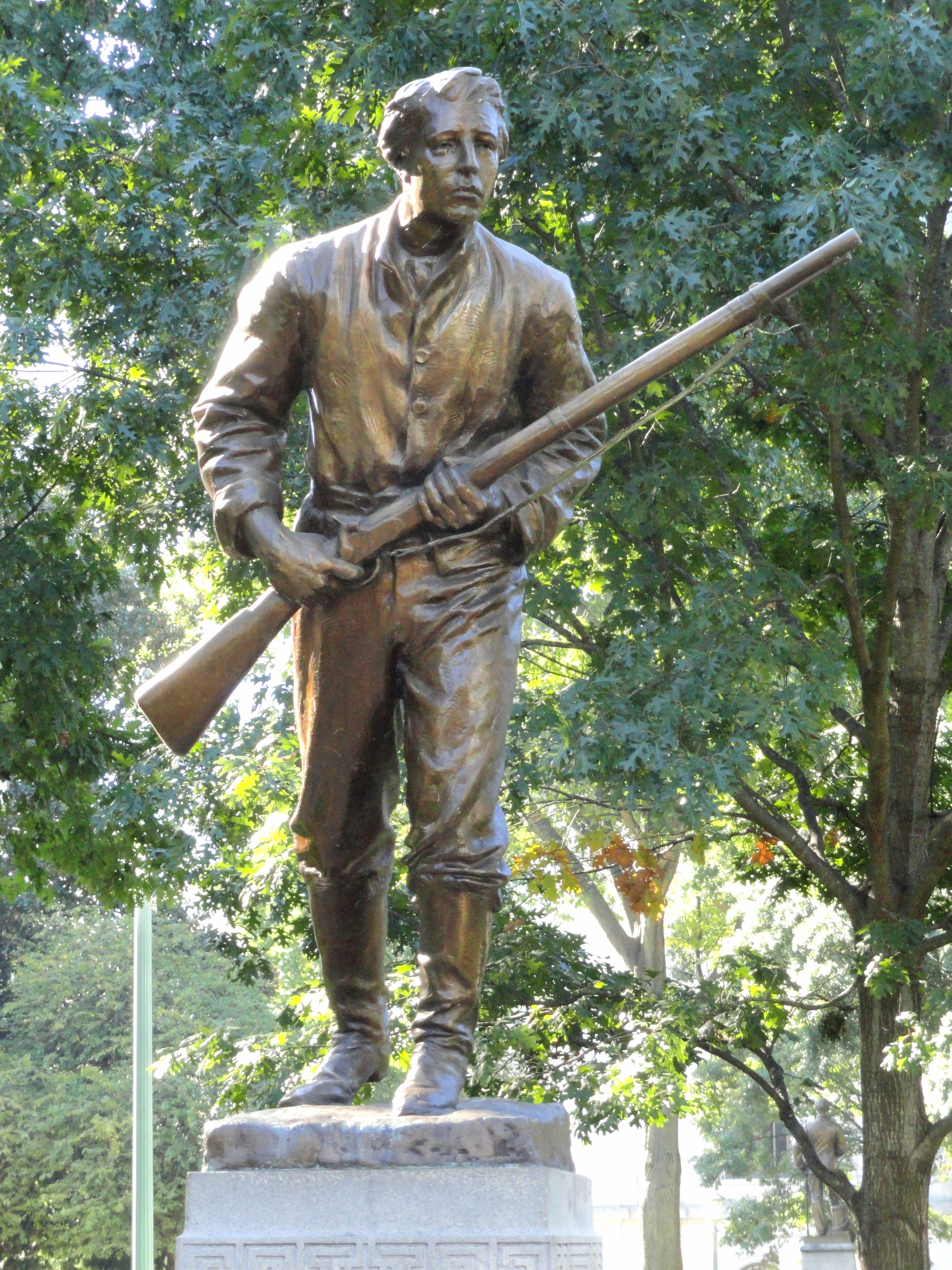
Memorial to Henry Lawson Wyatt, North Carolina State Capitol (1912)

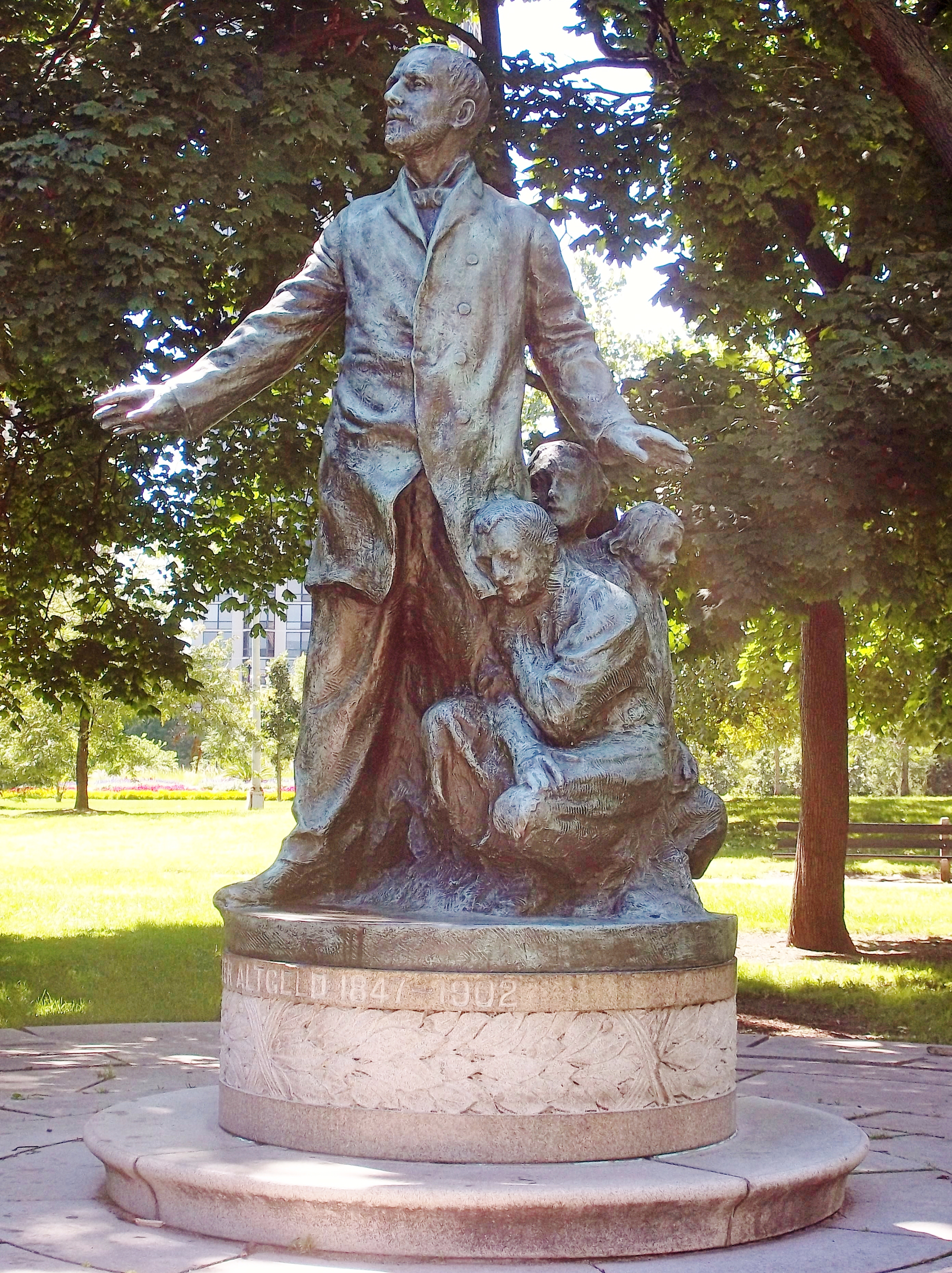
John Peter Altgeld, Lincoln Park, Chicago (1915)

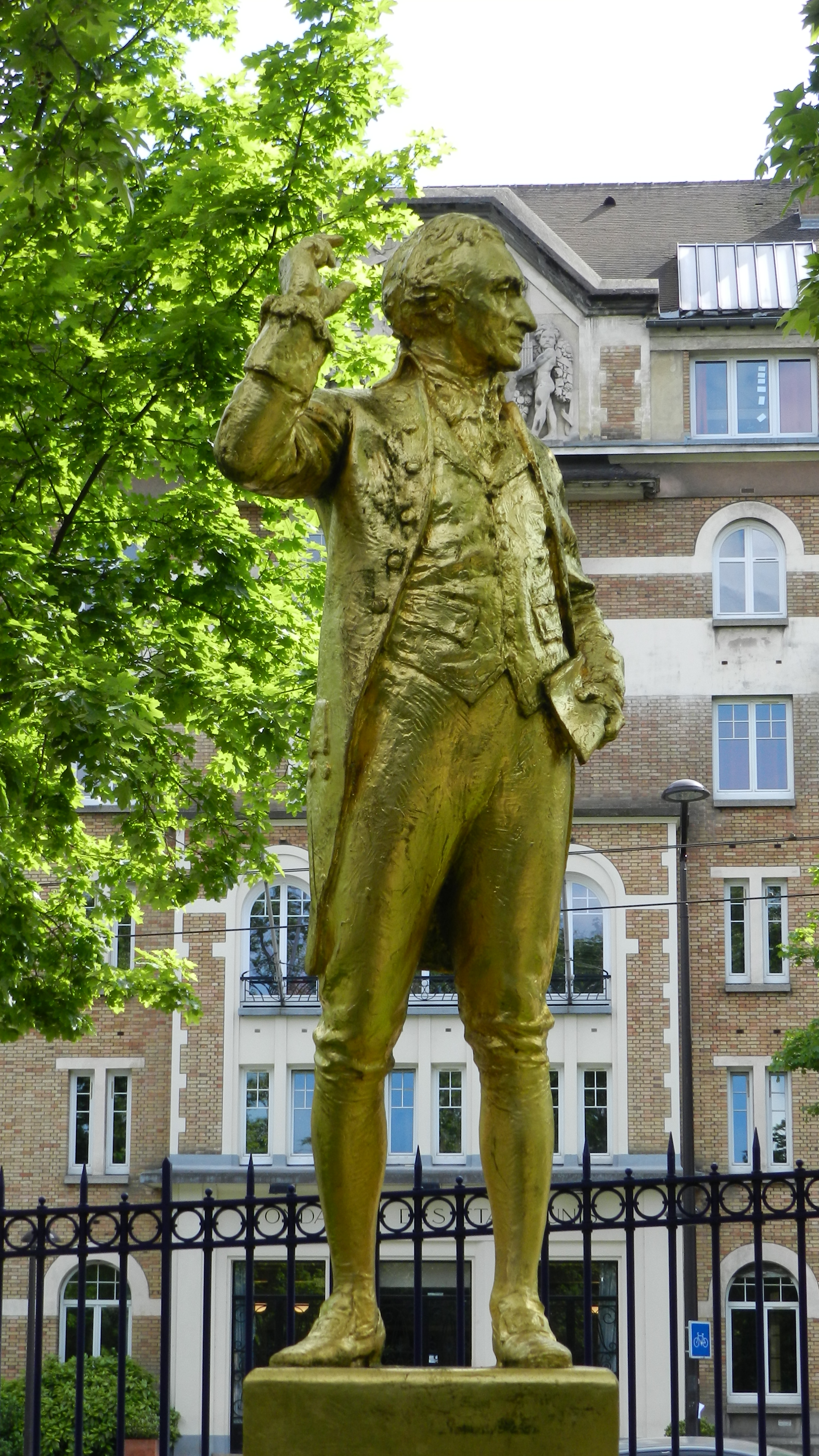
Thomas Paine, Montsouris, Paris (1936)

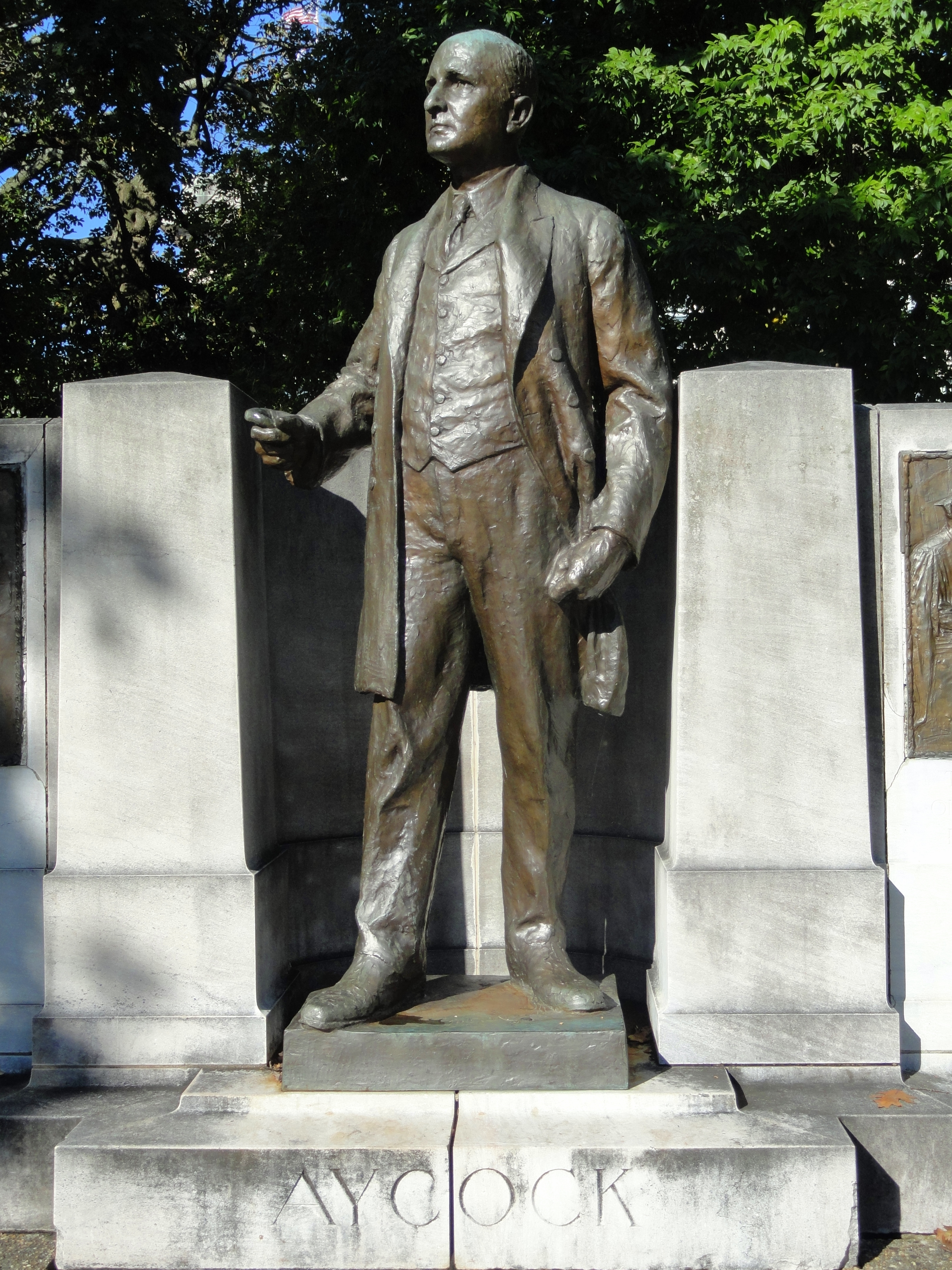
Memorial to Charles Brantley Aycock, North Carolina State Capitol (1941)

== See also ==
- Statue of John Campbell Greenway
- Sierra Madre, California
- James Patterson
- Chris Grabenstein
