= Lafayette Flying Corps =

American volunteer pilots who flew for France in World War I

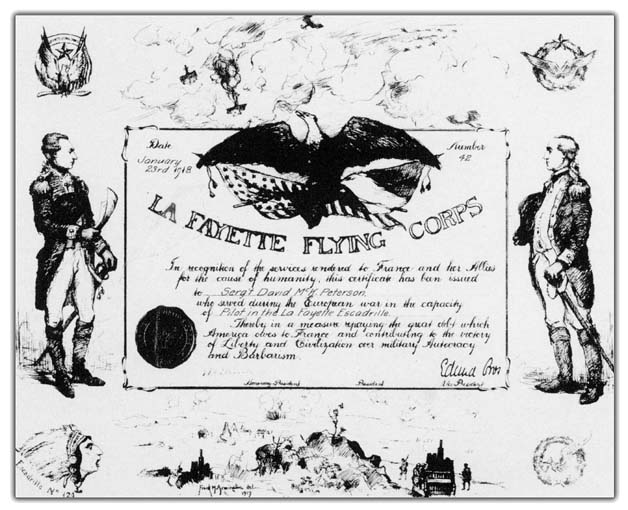
La Fayette Flying Corps service certificate

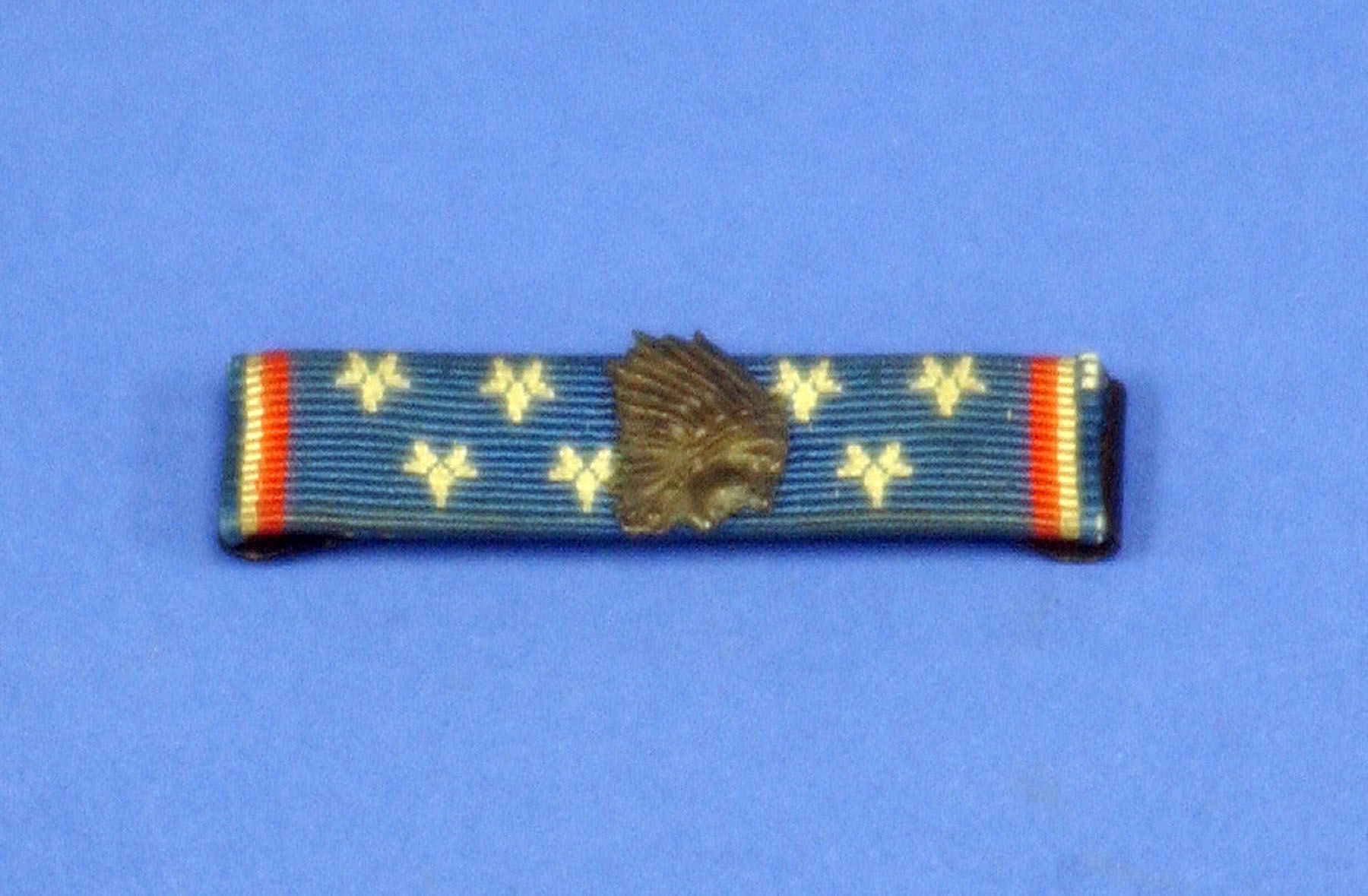
La Fayette Flying Corps service ribbon

The Lafayette Flying Corps is a name given to the American volunteer pilots who flew in the French Air Force (Armée de l'Air) during World War I. It includes the pilots who flew with the bona fide Lafayette Escadrille squadron.

== Numbers ==
The estimations of number of pilots range from 180 to over 300. The generally accepted number of pilots who successfully completed French flight training is 209. Of these, 180 served in combat.

More than 50 Flying Corps personnel (including members of the Lafayette Escadrille) initially served in the Ambulance Corps of the American Field Service. AFS Surgeon-General Col. Edmund L. Gros, M.D. is credited with initiating the corps.

== Casualties and honors ==
Sixty-nine Corps members died during the war, 42 of them in action against the enemy. The rest were results of disease, accidents, wounds, and suicide. The planes weren't very sturdy, and sometimes guns jammed, too, just when they were needed. The Corps is credited with 159 enemy kills. It amassed 31 Croix de Guerre, and its pilots were awarded seven Médailles militaires and four Légions d'honneur. Eleven of its members were deemed flying aces, claiming five air kills or more. The core squadron suffered nine losses and was credited with 41 victories.

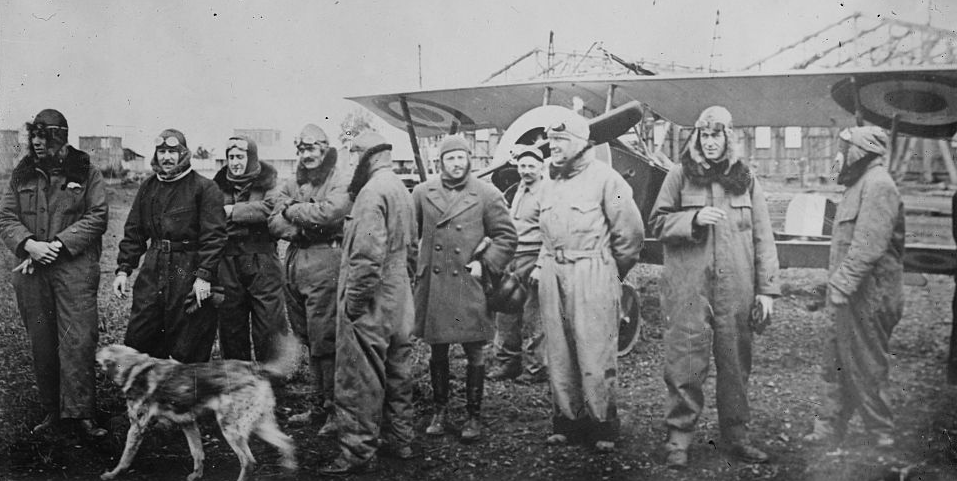
Lafayette Escadrille pilots with Fram and a Nieuport 16, March 1916. Pilots L-R: Sergeant Victor Emmanuel Chapman of New York City, New York; Sergeant Elliott Christopher Cowdin II of New York City, New York; Adjutant Bert Hall of Missouri, USA; Lieutenant William Thaw II of Pittsburgh, Pennsylvania; Lieutenant Alfred de Laage de Meux of Clesse, Deux Sèvres, France; Sous-Lieutenant Norman Prince of Boston, Massachusetts; Sergeant James Rogers McConnell of Carthage, North Carolina; Sergeant Kiffin Yates Rockwell of Asheville, North Carolina; Captain Georges Thenault of Paris, France, and Fram (Captain Thenault's "bon chien")

== Note ==
The terms “Lafayette Escadrille” and “Lafayette Flying Corps” are often confused, a misconception reinforced by the film Flyboys.

In reality, the Lafayette Escadrille was a single squadron (Escadrille N.124) in the French Air Service, composed primarily of American volunteer pilots. The Lafayette Flying Corps refers to the larger group of American volunteers who flew for various French squadrons during World War I—including, but not limited to, those in the Lafayette Escadrille.

In short: the Escadrille was one unit within the broader Flying Corps.

== Member list ==
Members

- Wainwright Abbott
- James G. Adams
- John Russell Adams
- Sidney Thayer Allen
- Walter K. Appleton, Jr.
- Alan Newton Ash (died in service)
- Arthur Mills Aten
- Jules James Bach
- Paul Frank Baer
- Benjamin Hester Baird
- Horace Clyde Balsley (Lafayette Escadrille)
- Leif Norman Barclay (died in service)
- Charles Chester Bassett, Jr.
- Henry Augustus Batchelor
- James Henry Baugham (died in service)
- Frank Leaman Baylies (died in service)
- James Alexander Bayne (died in service)
- Philip Phillips Benny (died in service)
- Leo E. Benoît (alias Ernest L. Benway)
- Charles John Biddle
- Julian Cornell Biddle (died in service)
- Stephen Sohier Bigelow (Lafayette Escadrille)
- Charles Raymond Blake
- Arthur Bluethenthal (died in service)
- Pierre de Lagarde Boal
- Ellison Converse Bogos
- William Vernon Booth, Jr. (died in service)
- Clarence Marsh Bosworth
- Edgar Jean Bouligny
- Algernon Boyesen
- Lester Strayer Brady
- Ray Claflin Bridgman (Lafayette Escadrille)
- Jasper Cornish Brown
- Stafford Leighton Brown (died in service)
- Everett Timothy Buckley
- Thomas Bradley Buffum
- Eugene Jacques Bullard, the world's first black military pilot (93 Spad Squadron)
- Richard Nixon Bullen
- William Graham Bullen
- Philip Nelson Bush
- Louis Leslie Byers
- Andrew Courtney Campbell, Jr. (Lafayette Escadrille, died in service)
- Hugh Gordon Campbell
- Joseph Maxwell Carrere, Jr.
- Thomas Gantz Cassady
- Oliver Moulton Chadwick (died in service)
- Cyrus Foss Chamberlain (died in service)
- Charles Wesley Chapman (died in service)
- Victor Chapman (Lafayette Escadrille, died in service)
- Louis Charton
- Herman Lincoln Chatkoff
- Roger Harvey Clapp (died in service)
- Caleb James Coatsworth
- Edward M. Collier
- Phelps Collins (died in service)
- James Connelly
- Alan Augustus Cook
- Linn Palmer Cookson (died in service)
- Russell Bracken Corey
- Edward Charles Corsi
- John Rowell Cotton
- Isadore Court
- Elliot Christopher Cowdin (Lafayette Escadrille)
- Austen Ballard Crehore
- Arthur Lawrence Cunningham
- Frazier Curtis
- Alvan Alexander Cushman
- Philip Washburn Davis (died in service)
- George Dock, Jr.
- Charles Heave Dolan (Lafayette Escadrille)
- Robert Louis Donze
- James Ralph Doolittle (Lafayette Escadrille, died in service)
- Dennis Dowd (died in service)
- Meredith Loveland Dowd (died in service)
- Sidney Rankin Drew, Jr. (died in service)
- John Armstrong Drexel (Lafayette Escadrille)
- Nathaniel Edmund Duffy
- William Edward Dugan, Jr. (Lafayette Escadrille)
- Lowell Richards Dulon
- Sherburne Eaton
- Stuart Emmet Edgar (died in service)
- Donald Herbert Eldredge
- Chester Arthur Elliott
- Dinsmore Ely (died in service)
- John Endicott
- Robert Grimshaw Eoff
- Edwin Bradley Fairchild
- Clarence Henry Faith
- Cedric Erroll Fauntleroy
- Ian Fearchar Ferguson
- Joseph Flynn
- Christopher William Ford (Lafayette Escadrille)
- Tod Ford
- Henry Forster
- Eric Anderson Fowler (died in service)
- William Frey
- Edmond Charles Clinton Genet (Lafayette Escadrille, died in service)
- William Wallace Gibson
- Joseph Francis Gill
- William Smith Gilmore
- Clarence Merritt Glover
- Reginald G. Gourard
- Charles Gossage Grey
- Henry Norman Grieb (died in service)
- James Murray Grier
- David Porter Guest
- Andre Gundelach (died in service)
- David Wade Guy
- James Norman Hall (Lafayette Escadrille)
- Weston Birch Hall (Lafayette Escadrille)
- Edgar Guerard Hamilton
- Robert Marshall Hanford (died in service)
- John B. Harrison, Jr.
- Willis Bradley Haviland (Lafayette Escadrille)
- John Raynolds Heilbuth
- Thomas Moses Hewitt, Jr. (Lafayette Escadrille)
- Leslie Matheson Hickson
- Dudley Lawrence Hill (Lafayette Escadrille)
- Edward Foote Hinkle (Lafayette Escadrille)
- Tommy Hitchcock, Jr. (1900–1944), star professional polo player, later assistant air attaché to the US Embassy in Great Britain during World War II
- Warren Tucker Hobbs (Lafayette Escadrille, died in service)
- Robert Bentley Hoeber
- Milton Whitely Holden
- Charles Dabney Horton
- Ronald Wood Hoskier (Lafayette Escadrille, died in service)
- Edwin A. Hough
- John William Huffer
- Daniel Elliott Huger
- Earl Wayland Hughes
- Mark Leslie Hull
- Sereno Thorp Jacob
- Charles Chouteau Johnson (Lafayette Escadrille)
- Harry Firmstune Johnson (died in service)
- Archibald Burtt Johnston
- Charles Maury Jones
- Henry Sweet Jones (Lafayette Escadrille)
- Edward David Judd
- Lt. Clarence Courtney Kahle (99th Fighter Squadron, A.E.F., Lafayette Flying Corps, died in combat)
- Hugo Alden Kenyon
- Charles Wayne Kerwood
- Charles McIlvaine Kinsolving
- William Francis Kirkwood
- John Robert Kowall
- Theodore De Kruijff
- George Marion Kyle
- Gorman De Freest Larner
- Henry S. Lee
- Schuyler Lee (died in service)
- Manderson Lehr (died in service)
- David Wilbur Lewis
- Kenneth Procter Littauer
- Ralph Lane Loomis
- William Fitch Loomis
- Edward Loughran (died in service)
- Walter Lovell (Lafayette Escadrille)
- W. Leslie Ludlam
- Raoul Gervais Lufbery (Lafayette Escadrille, died in service)
- Gordon B. Macke
- Douglas Macmonagle (Lafayette Escadrille, died in service)
- Guy Bertram Magley
- Charles Thomas Malone
- Harold L. Manierre
- Kenneth Archibald Marr (Lafayette Escadrille)
- Pierre Didier Masson (Lafayette Escadrille)
- George Archibald McCall
- James Rogers McConnell (Lafayette Escadrille, died in service)
- James B. McCreary, Jr.
- William McGinn
- 'Lucky' Herschel McKee (1897–1964), McKee made 12 kills to become the youngest Ace
- William John McKerness (died in service)
- James Haitt McMillen
- William Henry Meeker (died in service)
- Gordon R. Miles
- Alvin Ford Miller
- George Miller
- Walter Bernard Miller (died in service)
- Bennet Arthur Molter
- Robert Louis Moore
- George Moseley
- Oscar Mouvet
- Curtis B. Munson
- Alan Hammond Nichols (died in service)
- Charles Bernard Nordhoff
- Nathan Prince Oakes, Jr.
- Carter Landram Ovington (died in service)
- David Paden
- Henry Brewster Palmer (died in service)
- Austen Gilette Parker
- Edwin Charles Parsons (Lafayette Escadrille)
- Paul Pavelka (Lafayette Escadrille, died in service)
- Alfred Digby Pelton (died in service)
- David M. Peterson, (Lafayette Escadrille, died in service)
- Granville Alexander Pollock
- William Ponder
- Thomas Windeatt Potter
- Frederick Henry Prince, Jr. (Lafayette Escadrille)
- Norman Prince (Lafayette Escadrille, died in service)
- David Endicott Putnam (died in service)
- John Francis Randall
- Rufus Rand
- Robert Emery Read
- Leonard Minor Reno
- Walter Davis Rheno (died in service)
- Hugh Owen Ridlon
- George J. Rockwell, Jr.
- Kiffin Yates Rockwell (Lafayette Escadrille, died in service)
- Robert Lockerbie Rockwell (Lafayette Escadrille)
- Marius Romain Rocle
- William Blackstock Rodgers, Jr.
- John F. Rolf, Jr.
- Clifford De Roode
- Raymond Thomas Ross
- Kenneth Rotharmel
- Leland Lassell Rounds
- Laurence Dana Rumsey, Jr. (Lafayette Escadrille)
- Joseph Roe Saul
- Harold Young Saxon
- Lawrence Scanlan
- Edwin Booth Schreiber (died in service)
- Horace Seaver
- Walter John Shaffer
- Walter B. Shipley
- Clarence Bernard Shoninger (Croix de Guerre recipient)
- Reginald Sinclaire
- Glenn Nelson Sitterly
- Samuel Wiggins Skinner (died in service)
- Robert Soubiran (Lafayette Escadrille)
- Wallace Speers
- Dumaresq Spencer (died in service)
- Alfred Holt Stanley
- Frank Elmer Starret, Jr. (died in service)
- Russell Falconer Stearns
- Joseph Charles Stehlin
- Henry Elmer Stickney
- Donald Edward Stone (died in service)
- Gerald Starr Stone
- Upton Supple Sullivan
- Leslie Ray Taber
- William Hallet Tailer (died in service)
- Elmer Bowden Taylor (died in service)
- Hugh Terres (died in service)
- William Thaw (aviator) (Lafayette Escadrille)
- Clifton Badlam Thompson
- Charles Trinkard (died in service)
- Dudley Gilman Tucker (died in service)
- George Evans Turnure, Jr.
- Stephen Mitchell Tyson (died in service)
- Fleet William Carey Van, Jr.
- Charles Herbert Veil
- Neal Wainwright
- Benjamin Stuart Walcott (died in service)
- William Ethelbert Van Wass
- William A. "Wild Bill" Wellman (1896–1975), Director of "Wings" (the first motion picture to win the Academy Award)
- Frank Willard Wells
- Herman Kotzchmer Whitmore
- John Joyce Whitmore
- Charles Herbert Wilcox
- Marcellus Edward Wild
- George Gale Willard
- Harold Buckley Willis (Lafayette Escadrille)
- Westel Robinson Willoughby
- Joseph Volney Wilson (died in service)
- Pierre Marie Wilson
- Alan Francis Winslow
- Carroll Dana Winslow
- Charles Wallace Winter, Jr. (died in service)
- Henry Houston Woodward (died in service)
- Warwick Worthington
- Harold Everett Wright
- Walter Raymond York (died in service)
- Frederick Wilhelm Zinn

The following pilots are not listed as part of the Flying Corps by the Lafayette Escadrille Memorial Foundation.

- Gill Robb Wilson

== See also ==
- List of World War I flying aces
- Vintage Aero Flying Museum
