= Lafayette Escadrille (film) =

1958 film by William A. Wellman

- theatrical release poster
- Directed by: William A. Wellman
- Screenplay by: Albert Sidney Fleischman
- Story by: William A. Wellman
- Produced by: William A. Wellman
- Starring: Tab Hunter; Etchika Choureau; David Janssen
- Narrated by: William A. Wellman (uncredited)
- Cinematography: William H. Clothier
- Edited by: Owen Marks
- Music by: Leonard Rosenman
- Production company: Warner Bros. Pictures
- Distributed by: Warner Bros. Pictures
- Release date: February 28, 1958
- Running time: 93 minutes
- Country: United States
- Language: English

Lafayette Escadrille (originally titled C'est la Guerre) is a 1958 American war film released by Warner Bros. Pictures, starring Tab Hunter, Etchika Choureau and features David Janssen and Will Hutchins; Clint Eastwood appears in an early supporting role. It was the final film in the career of director William A. Wellman and is based on his original story.

== Plot ==
Thad Walker, a spoiled, rich kid from Boston who had gotten in serious trouble with the law, fled to France to join the French Foreign Legion in World War I. In Paris, with companions, "Duke" Sinclair, Dave Putnam, Tom Hitchcock and Bill Wellman, the boys stop at a bar and learn of the recent formation of the Lafayette Escadrille made up of American volunteer pilots who fly for France. The group of expatriates join up and learn to fly on training aircraft before becoming combat pilots.

While off duty, Walker meets and falls in love with Renée Beaulieu, a common streetwalker with some sensitivity; she quits the oldest profession and takes a job, reforming for her American lover's sake. Walker's father beat him, and he resents any kind of authority. When a strutting, arrogant French officer, irritated by the young man's inability to understand commands in French, strikes him, he knocks the officer to the ground, a very serious offense. Before he can be jailed, his pals smuggle Walker out of camp. He then spends a great deal of time hiding in Paris in his sweetheart's apartment. His friends continue with their training while Walker works for the Madam, hoping to make enough money to run away to South America with his girlfriend.

Later, the now veteran pilots he had befriended come to the bar and Walker realizes he still wants to redeem himself. Convincing an American general that he is sincere, when the United States enters the war, he joins the American Air Service. (Note: Wellman based the contact with an American general on his own encounter with General John J. "Black Jack" Pershing.) Walker is finally able to fly a mission with the Lafayette Escadrille, where he proves to be a superb fighter pilot. Returning to Paris, Walker asks his friends to join him as he weds Renée.

== Cast ==
- Tab Hunter as Thad Walker
- Etchika Choureau as Renée Beaulieu
- Marcel Dalio as Drill Sergeant
- David Janssen as "Duke" Sinclair
- Paul Fix as U.S. General
- Veola Vonn as The Madam
- Will Hutchins as Dave Putnam
- Clint Eastwood as George Moseley
- Robert Hover as Dave Judd
- Tom Laughlin as Arthur Blumenthal
- Brett Halsey as Frank Baylies
- Henry Nakamura as Jimmy
- Maurice Marsac as Sgt. Parris
- Raymond Bailey as Amos J. Walker
- William Wellman Jr. as Bill/William A. Wellman
- Jody McCrea as Tom Hitchcock
- Denny Devine as Lawrence "Red" Scanlan
- Ralph Guldahl as Dudley Tucker
- Sam Boghosian as Booth

Cast notes:

- The roles of "Duke" Sinclair (Reginald "Duke" Sinclaire), Dave Judd (Edward David Judd), Arthur Blumenthal and Frank Baylies (Frank Leamon Baylies) were also based by Wellman on actual members of the Escadrille
- Craig Hill's uncredited role as Lufberry, based on Raoul Gervais Lufbery, is essentially a walk-on role.

== Production ==
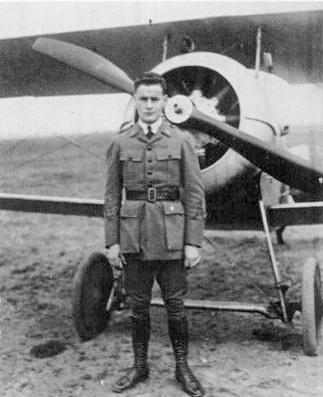
Corporal William Wellman and Celia Nieuport 24 fighter c. 1917 (one of a series of aircraft all named after his mother)

Relying on his own World War I service, Wellman wrote the original story, based on the actual exploits of a friend from the war years. Earning himself the nickname "Wild Bill", Wellman was first an ambulance driver in the Norton-Harjes Ambulance Corps, then joined the French Foreign Legion. On December 3, 1917, assigned as the first American fighter pilot to join N.87 escadrille in the Lafayette Flying Corps, Wellman went on to score three recorded "kills", along with five probables and to receive the Croix de Guerre with two palms.

Although he considered Lafayette Escadrille a "personal project", the studio did not give Wellman the budget he demanded and continued to interfere with the project, to the extent that the decisions on starring roles, title, ending and other important aspects of the production were taken out of his hands, including the title of the film: Wellman's original title was C'est la Guerre which the studio, despite his objections, changed to Lafayette Escadrille. In casting, Wellman wanted Paul Newman and Clint Eastwood as the leads; studio head Jack L. Warner refused, and substituted teen idol Tab Hunter and David Janssen, with Eastwood moved to a minor role. Warner also insisted Wellman make Darby's Rangers as a condition of financing Lafayette Escadrille.

The use of mocked-up Nieuport 28 and Thomas-Morse Scout fighters along with other period aircraft such as one real Fokker D.VII and the ubiquitous Travelair "Wichita Fokkers" were "lifted" from Wellman's earlier 1938 production, Men with Wings, an early color feature also directed by Wellman. Principal photography took place primarily at the Hancock Santa Maria, California airport. Hollywood stunt pilot Paul Mantz, built a number of Blériot XI "Penguin" clipped-wing and full span training aircraft, used in the training sequences.

According to information in the Warner Bros. Archive, the original script—with the tragic ending in which Walker dies in combat and Renée commits suicide—was written by Paul Fix. A later script, dated October 1956 and attributed to A. Fleischman (with story credit to Wellman) has the happy ending. Shooting took place October 19 to December 8, 1956.

== Reception ==
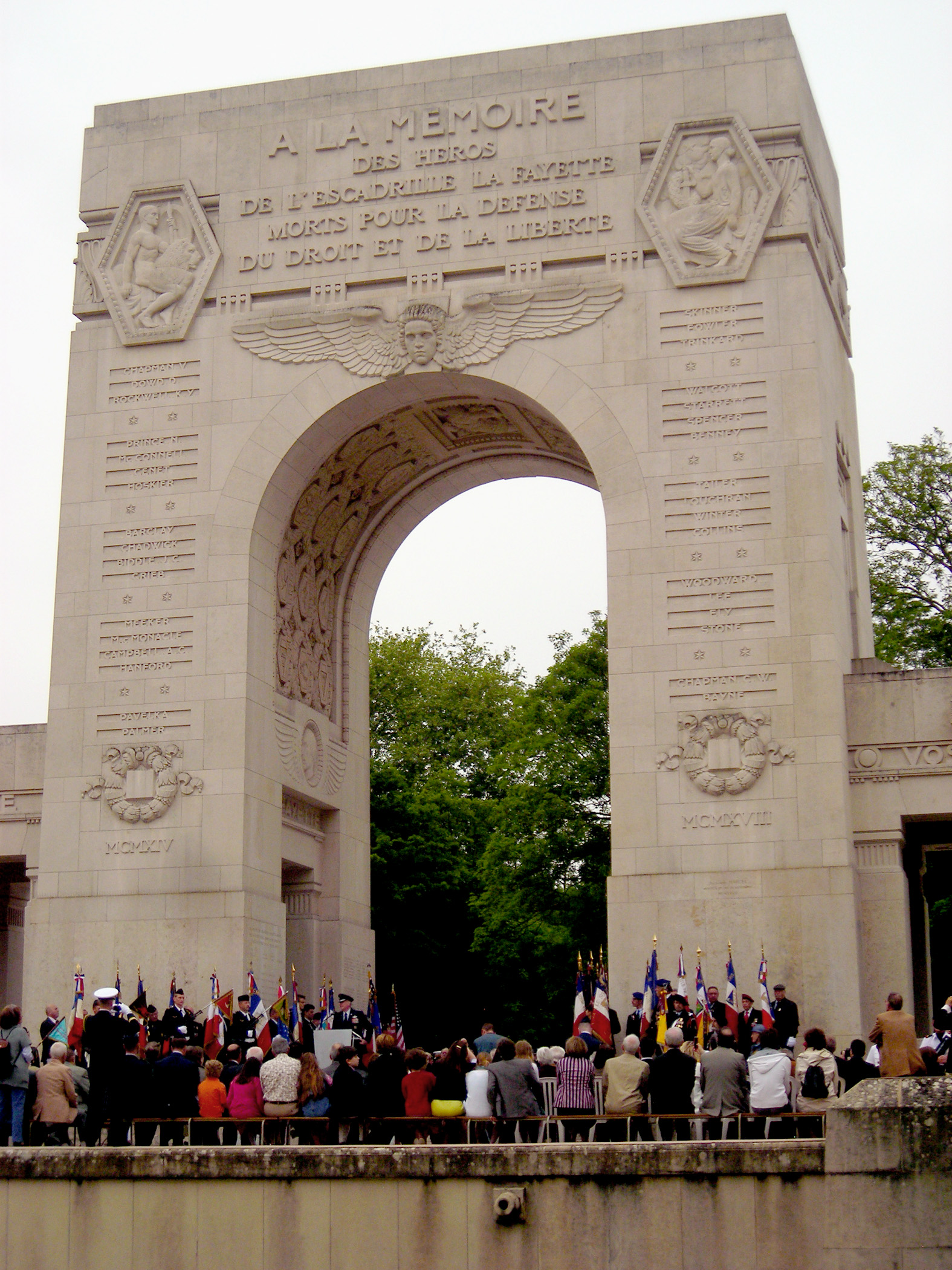
"Lafayette Escadrille" Memorial Arch

In Wellman's original cut of the film, Tab Hunter's character is killed in the air while trying to rejoin his squadron; his young lover, stricken with grief over his death, throws herself off a bridge into the Seine River. However this ending was poorly received at previews and instead a new happy ending was shot in April–May 1957 in which both characters live and are reunited.

While the aviation scenes in Lafayette Escadrille were well received (William Clothier filmed the spectacular aerial sequences, evocative of those he shot in Wellman's earlier silent classic Wings), critics said the film falls far short of the classic status of the 1928 Oscar winner. The flying sequences were not enough to overcome a mediocre story and flat acting, aspects roundly panned by critics. Howard Thompson, reviewer for The New York Times called it a "flapdoodle" in his blistering review.Variety echoed other reviews, noting, "What could have been an reasonably good actioneer ... has been badly marred by a flat predictability in plot, intrusion of an inept and, at times, ludicrously irrelevant romance and some quite dreadful dialog."

The Lafayette Escadrille was also totally disowned by those still alive who had flown as part of the fabled Lafayette Escadrille and the Lafayette Flying Corps, who were understandably upset at their portrayal, including Wellman who insisted that his producer's credit be removed.

This was to be William Wellman's last released directorial effort (although he subsequently directed Darby's Rangers which was released earlier); it had started out to be a paean to his memories of the storied squadron, but ended up a target for insults, accusations and lawsuits, not the least of which were directed against Jack Warner and Warner Brothers Studios for their heavy-handed interference.

The film was shelved for two years, partly because of the wrangling between the two Hollywood heavyweights. TCM.com reports that a modern source suggests that the delay was at least partly due to the studio's hopes that Hunter would succeed as a singer. (Hunter's first hit single was released on Dot Records. Warners decided to establish its own record label to release Tab Hunter songs.) So a "pollyanna" ending grafted into the film.

Wellman was "heartbroken" with his treatment at the hands of Jack L. Warner, and kept his word that Lafayette Escadrille would be his last film.

== See also ==
- The Legion of the Condemned (1928)
- Flyboys (2006)
