= David Guy (disambiguation) =

David Guy (1897–1960) was an American military aviator.

Dave or David Guy may also refer to:

- Dave Guy (born 1978), American musician
- David Guy (author) (born 1948), American author

== See also ==
- Guy David (disambiguation)
