= Guy David =

Guy David may refer to:

- Guy David (footballer)
- Guy David (mathematician)

== See also ==
- Guy Davidi
- David Guy (disambiguation)
