= Victor Sayaret =

World War I flying ace

Victor Louis Georges Sayaret
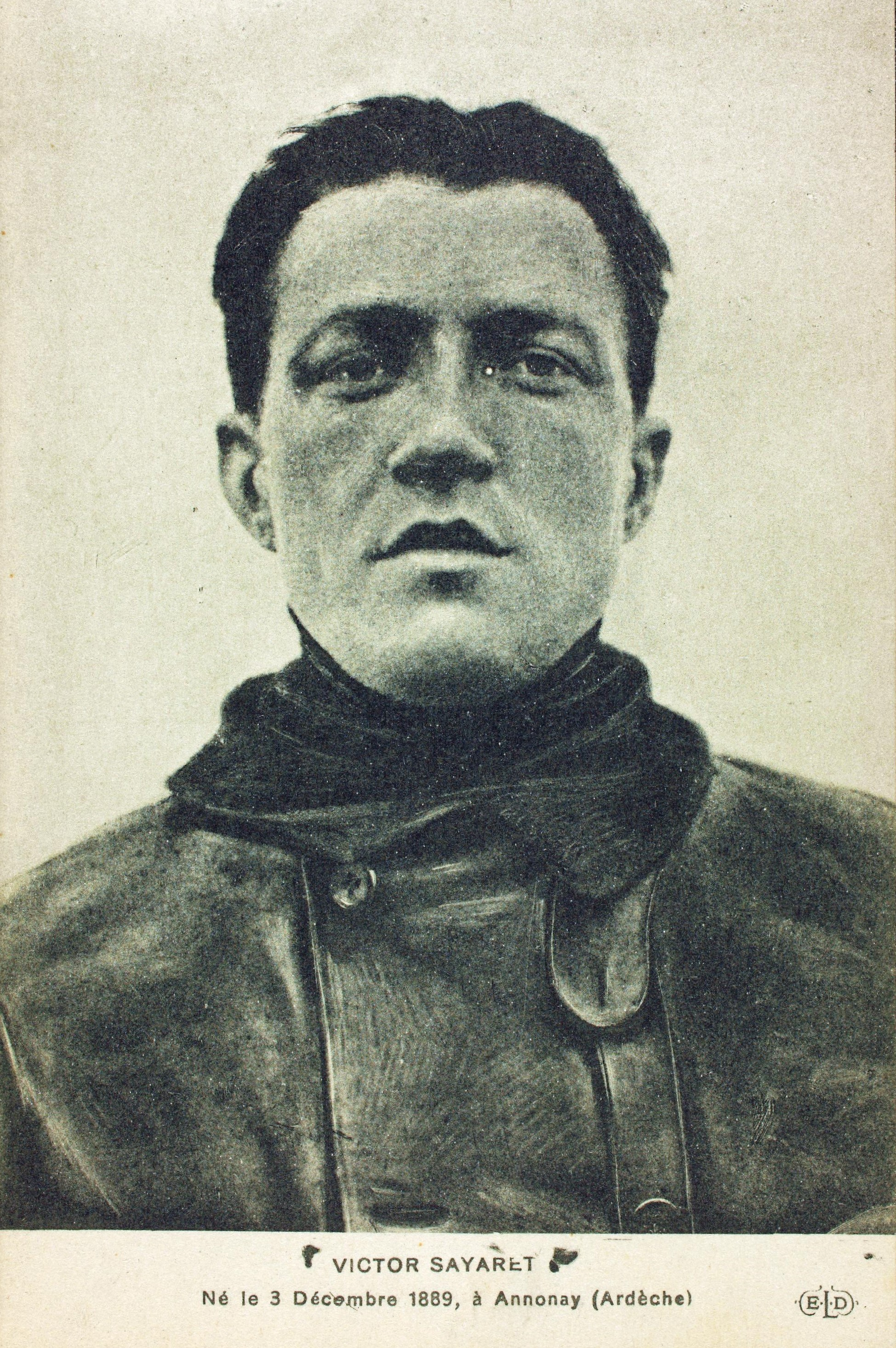
- Born: 3 December 1889; Annonay, France
- Died: 19 July 1980 (aged 90); Seine-Maritime, France
- Military career
- Allegiance: France
- Branch: Cavalry; aviation
- Rank: Ajutant chef
- Units: Escadrille 24; Escadrille 57; Escadrille 78
- Awards: Légion d'honneur Médaille militaire Croix de Guerre

Victor Louis Georges Sayaret (3 December 1889 – 19 July 1980) was a World War I flying ace credited with seven aerial victories.

== Early life and World War I ==
See also Aerial victory standards of World War I

Victor Louis Georges Sayaret was born in Annonay, France on 3 December 1889. The son of Lucien Sayaret and Léonie Degonichon, he joined the military cavalry, on 15 June 1909.

Just after World War I began, Sayaret joined the 2nd Regiment of Dragons on 2 August 1914 and later transferred to the aerial service. He joined the Military Aeronautics on 17 March 1915. He was flying a Voisin for Escadrille 24 when he downed his first enemy aircraft on 18 June 1915. On 21 May 1916, he transferred to Escadrille 57 to fly a Nieuport fighter. On 17 June 1916, he scored the first of six wins over the next year; four of these wins would be shared with four other pilots, including Raoul Lufbery.

== Postwar ==
Sayaret flew with the Mail Service. From 1924 to 1927, he was a test pilot for Farman. After that, he was a pilot for CIDNA between Prague and Bucharest and for Air France in Dakar. He died on 19 July 1980 in Grainville-Ymainville, Seine-Maritime, France.

== Honors and awards ==
Médaille militaire

"Pilot of outstanding vigor, dash, and devotion and showing magnificent spirit. He downed a German plane behind its lines on 4 August 1916. In June he had already forced an enemy plane to land in the proximity of our trenches. Already cited in orders."

Chevalier de la Légion d'honneur

"Has affirmed in an Escadrille de chasse, the exceptional qualities of ardor and dash which he had already shown in an Escadrille de bombardment. Médaille militaire and cited twice in army orders, after having downed five enemy planes. He reported a sixth victory on 1 November 1916. During the course of 15 December attacks he descended to 100 meters above the ground and silenced a German battery by strafing it."

Croix de guerre with five palmes

Four times Mentioned in dispatches
