= Fred Zinn =

American aviator and photographer (1892–1960)

- Born: Friedrich Wilhelm Zinn; February 14, 1892; Galesburg, Michigan, United States
- Died: October 4, 1960 (aged 68); United States
- Education: University of Michigan
- Occupations: Aviator, army officer

Friedrich Wilhelm "Fred" Zinn was a volunteer American aviator of German descent who flew with French Armée de l'Air forces in World War I and an early pioneer of aerial photography for wartime reconnaissance and Military intelligence.

Fred Zinn lived in Battle Creek, Michigan. While visiting France in August 1914, he joined the French Foreign Legion shortly after the outbreak of World War I. He was one of the group who signed the American Volunteer Corps flag in Paris on October 17, 1914, before departing for Rouen.

He served on the Western Front until February 1, 1916, when he was wounded for the second time during a German artillery attack.

Zinn transferred to the French Aéronautique Militaire on February 14, 1916. He served as gunner and bombardier with Escadrille F-14 from December 12, 1916, until October 21, 1917, often augmenting his bombing duties by taking reconnaissance photographs of enemy lines before returning to base.

Zinn was one of the first aviators to attempt to photograph enemy troop positions from the air to assist commanders on the ground. This had previously been done from manned balloons, but they were vulnerable to enemy fire and had to be kept behind the lines. By flying directly over enemy positions and taking photographs, Zinn provided French commanders with a far better view of the battlefield, and the techniques he and others developed soon became standard practice for both sides in the trench warfare style conflict.

He was decorated twice by the French government for bravery for flying low over enemy lines on these reconnaissance missions.

Although not formally assigned to the American Lafayette Escadrille, Zinn was recorded as an observer for the Escadrille, presumably while taking aerial photographs.

After the United States entered the war in 1917, Zinn entered the U.S. Army Air Service as a captain and was attached to American GHQ at Chaumont until the Armistice on November 11, 1918. He was one of a small number of Legionnaires who entered the war in August 1914 to survive over four years of active service and over three full years in combat units. Some French Foreign Legion units had close to 100% casualties in the intense trench warfare.

At the close of war, Zinn remained in Europe leading a team of what could only be called investigators, with the mission to research, locate, recover and identify American Airmen who were listed as Missing in Action. In Blaine Lee Pardoe's book, Lost Eagles: One Man's Mission to Find Missing Airmen in Two World Wars, which is about Zinn's mission after the war, he notes Zinn was highly successful and credits Zinn with being the "first person to conceive of the idea that missing men could be found, identified, and brought back to the arms of their country and to the hearts of their surviving families. He pioneered the concept of never leaving a man behind." This mission he carried through even after he returned home and to this day, his files in the National Archives are among the most requested. His success and methods were so well known that he was employed during World War II to find more missing American aviators.

Zinn returned to the United States after the war and continued flying, including a trip to San Francisco where his biplane was required to fly only over the waters of San Francisco Bay due to a perceived danger to citizens if it traveled over land.

== See also ==
- Lafayette Flying Corps
