= Bert Hall =

American aviator

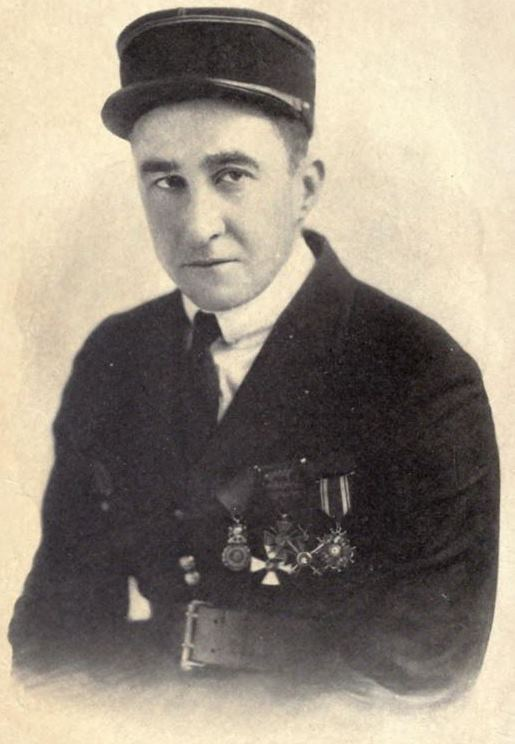
- American aviator Bert Hall, from the front piece of his book En l'air (1918)
- Born: Weston Birch Hall; 7 November 1885; Near Higginsville, Missouri, United States
- Died: 6 December 1948 (aged 63); Near Fremont, Ohio, United States
- Military career
- Branch: Infantry; Aéronautique Militaire
- Rank: Lieutenant
- Nickname: Bert
- Unit: Lafayette Escadrille
- Conflicts: First World War
- Awards: Médaille militaire Croix de Guerre; Order of Saint George; Order of Saint Vladimir; Order of Saint Stanislav; Virtutea Militară

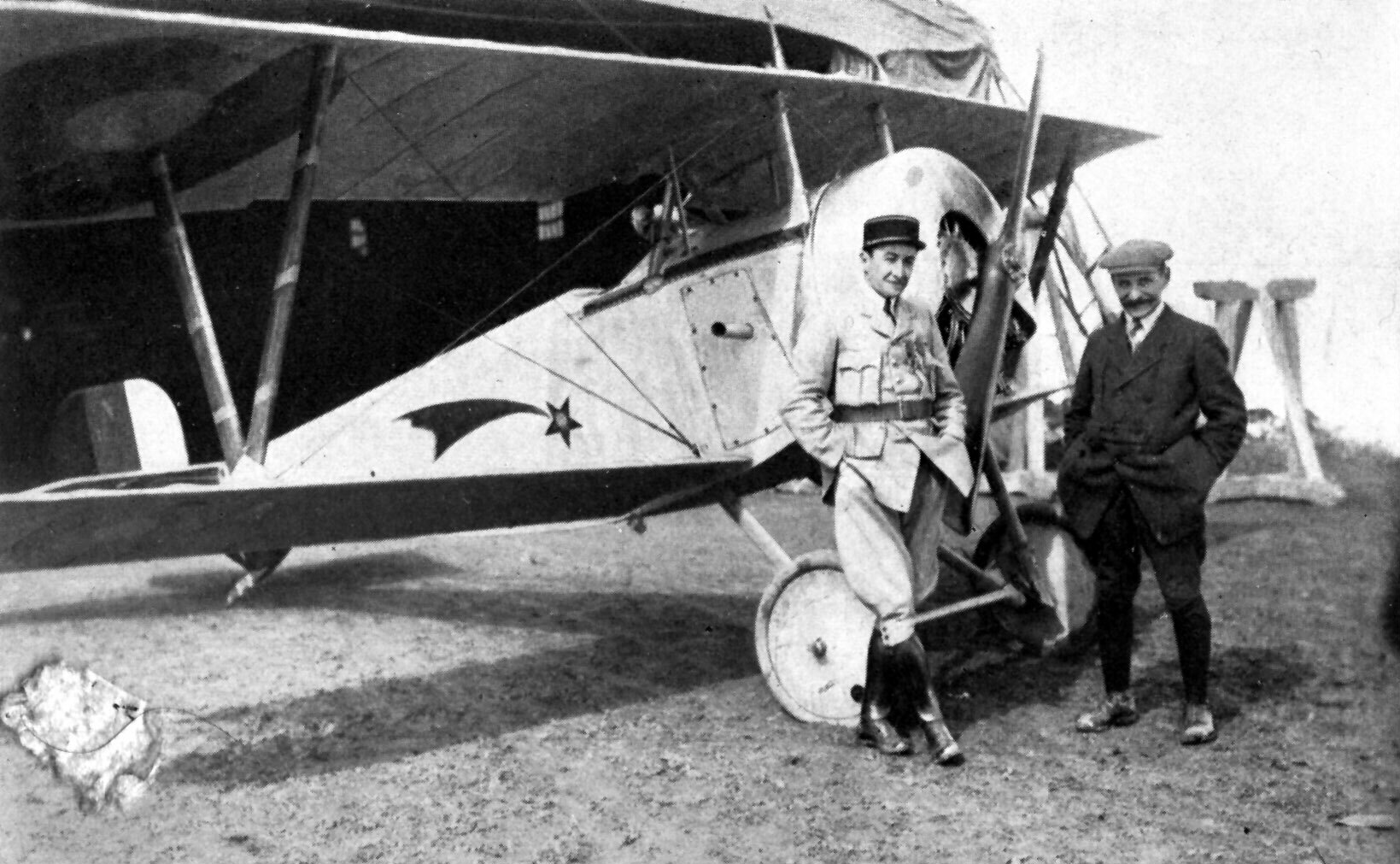
Bert Hall and a Nieuport 11

Weston Birch "Bert" Hall (November 7, 1885 – December 6, 1948) was a military aviator and writer. Hall was one of America's first combat aviators, flying with the famed Lafayette Escadrille in France before the U.S. entered World War I.

== Biography ==
Hall was born near Higginsville, Missouri, the son of George Hall.

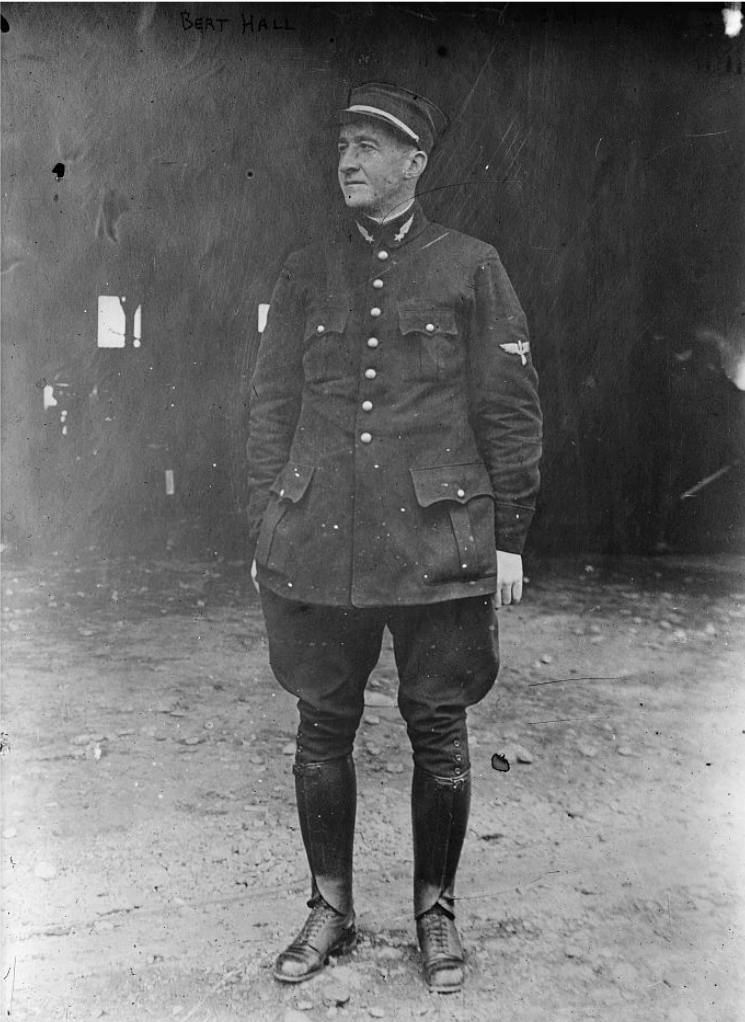
Bert Hall during WW I

Bert Hall learned to fly in 1910 at Buc, France, using a "Maurice Farman Biplane Pusher, with a fog-cutter out in front and an air-cooled Renault motor behind." He subsequently acquired a "new 1913 Blériot, equipped with a 60 H.P. Gnome motor", and on February 16, 1913, he along with his French mechanic André Pierce became soldiers of fortune flying for the Sultan of Turkey, for 100 American Dollars a day, against the Bulgarians. On the first day he was paid in Turkish currency and refused to fly, but received "in gold money" from then on. After two months the Turkish Army payments became inconsistent "fifty dollars one day and sixty the next and forty-five the next", so Bert and André "packed up and flew into Romania (sic), stopping at Bucharest ... receiving the equivalent of one hundred dollars gold per day in advance.". After 30 days the Bulgarians welshed, but before Bert and his mechanic could depart with their gold, Bert was arrested, leaving André to bribe the jailers for Bert's release.

After a brief barnstorming tour through Ukraine, his Blériot motor quit over the Pyrenees Mountains outside of Tarbes and crashed. He salvaged the motor for 2,500 francs. In early August 1914, Bert and big game hunter René Philezot enlisted together as infantry in the French Foreign Legion Deuxiéme (Second) Regiment. In early October, 1914, Bill Thaw, Jimmy Bach, and Bert applied for aviation, and on December 14, 1914, the three entered "into the French Flying Corps."

Bert was one of the seven original members of the Lafayette Escadrille. However, he was greatly disliked by his comrades due to an abrasive personality and consistently lying.

Dennis Gordon wrote a book called Autobiographies of the Lafayette Escadrille published by the Doughboy Historical Society - POB 3912 Missoula, MT 59806. According to this book, Bert Hall had four confirmed kills in the LS and obtained several medals as the squadron adjutant. He was also described as a four-flusher, a liar, a deserter and a good poker player.

Hall wrote two books about the Lafayette Escadrille, En L'air (1918) and One Man's War: The Story of the Lafayette Escadrille (1929). The former was the basis of the 1918 film A Romance of the Air, in which he starred as himself.

In the book One Man's War: The Story of the Lafayette Escadrille, Bert Hall recounts how after he was taken off the front lines due to the mumps, he was to recover in the south of France, versus Paris where he had an apartment and female acquaintances. At the train depot he encountered a wounded soldier who was to recover in Paris, versus the south of France where he was from. So they mutually exchanged their destination "tags", Bert gave him all his cigarettes, and then shook his hand very gently. In this he admitted that he circumvented the French Army, and that he "always did object to doing things by the numbers anyhow".

He also tells of forcing a German Albatros down in French territory, and contrasts his own style versus his mechanic, Leon Mourreau, who also deserved credit as a gunner in his early two-seat Nieuport: "... my mechanic came in for no small part of this catch, and he deserved it too. But he was a modest fellow, and not nearly as good a talker as I was. Talking up one's exploits had its advantages, even in a big caliber war."

In civilian life, he joined the Philippine Aerial Taxi Company in Manila with Emil Bachrach and Capt. William Bradford in the early 1930s, and was one of the Instructor Pilots of Filipino World War II Capt. Jesus Villamor.

Hall was contracted by the Chinese government to buy surplus planes from the U.S. government and return to China to set up an air service for them, but failed to obtain permission from the State Department. He was charged with violating export restrictions and convicted. Bert Hall was released from McNeil Island Federal Penitentiary in May 1936.

He lived in Seattle for a few months before heading to Hollywood to work for Twentieth Century Fox studios. Weary of Hollywood, in 1940 he moved to Dayton, Ohio and in 1944 settled in Castalia, Ohio, where he started the Sturdy Toy Factory.

On December 6, 1948, he died of a heart attack while driving down a highway near Fremont, Ohio. His ashes were scattered over his hometown of Higginsville, Missouri on January 20, 1950.

== Bibliography ==
Hall wrote books about being a "Flyboy" in the Lafayette Escadrille:

- Hall, Bert. (1918) En L'air, New York: The New Library, Inc. ASIN: B000M1DSJM
- Hall, Bert. (1929) One Man's War: The Story of the Lafayette Escadrille, London: J. Hamilton. ASIN: B00087AA7I
