= Pierre Pendaries =

French flying ace

- Born: 21 June 1894; Chambéry, France
- Died: 3 April 1987 (aged 92); Saint-Cyr-sur-Mer, France
- Military career
- Allegiance: France
- Service years: 1914 - 1918
- Rank: Sous lieutenant
- Units: Escadrille 69; Escadrille 67
- Awards: Légion d'honneur Médaille militaire Croix de Guerre

Sous Lieutenant Pierre Hilaire Émile Albert Pendaries (21 June 1894 – 3 April 1987) was a World War I flying ace credited with seven aerial victories.

== Biography ==
Pendaries was born in Chambéry, France on 21 June 1894.

Pendaries was inducted into the infantry early in World War I, on 4 September 1914. On 17 December 1914, his infantry career was cut short by a terrible wounding. After he finally recovered, he was forwarded to be a student pilot on 19 August 1915. On 17 January 1916, he received his Military Pilot's Brevet. On 6 May 1916, he began flying combat with Escadrille N.69.

Shortly after his third victory, he was awarded the Médaille militaire on 28 May 1917. On 3 June, he again was seriously wounded. His recuperation was not complete until 2 February 1918, when he was assigned to Escadrille SPA.67. Having progressed through the enlisted ranks, he was promoted to Sous lieutenant on 28 March 1918.

By war's end on 11 November 1918, Pierre Pendaries had flown 1,180 combat hours. In addition to the Médaille militaire, he won the Legion d'honneur and the Croix de Guerre with seven palms.

Pendaries was demobilized from the French military on 21 September 1919. At some later date, he was upgraded in the Legion d'honneur to Commandeur.

== List of aerial victories ==
See also Aerial victory standards of World War I

Confirmed victories are numbered and listed chronologically. Unconfirmed victories are denoted by "u/c" and may or may not be listed by date.

No.	Date/time	Aircraft	Foe	Result	Location	Notes
1	1 August 1916	Nieuport		Destroyed		
2	22 April 1917	Nieuport		Destroyed		
3	3 May 1917	Nieuport	Rumpler reconnaissance plane	Destroyed	Auménancourt-le-Petit	
u/c	16 March 1918 @ 1420 hours	Spad	German two-seater		South of Challenonge	
4	17 May 1918 @ 1140 hours	Spad	German airplane	Destroyed	Mézières	
5	22 July 1918 @ 0545 hours	Spad	German airplane	Destroyed	Ville-en-Tardenois	Shared victory
6	26 September 1918 @ 1800 hours	Spad	German fighter	Destroyed	South of Tahure	Victory shared with another French pilot and Edwin C. Parsons
7	29 October 1918 @ 1317 hours	Spad	German two-seater	Destroyed	Amancourt	
