= James Alexander Connelly Jr. =

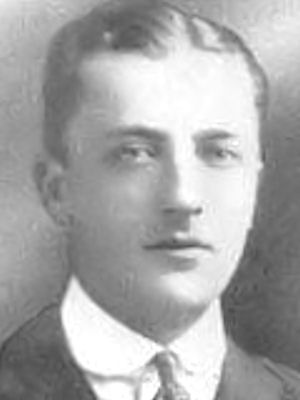
- Connelly in 1919
- Born: June 15, 1894; Merion, Pennsylvania, USA
- Died: February 1, 1944 (aged 49); Bryn Mawr, Pennsylvania, USA
- Military career
- Allegiance: France; United States
- Branch: Aéronautique Militaire (France); Air Service, United States Army
- Rank: Adjutant
- Units: French Foreign Legion; Aéronautique Militaire: Escadrille SPA 157; Escadrille SPA 163
- Conflicts: World War I
- Awards: Distinguished Service Cross, French Médaille militaire and Croix de Guerre

Adjutant James Alexander Connelly Jr. (June 15, 1894 – February 1, 1944) was a World War I flying ace credited with seven aerial victories.

== Biography ==
Connelly was born in Merion, Pennsylvania on June 15, 1894. He joined 1st Regiment of the French Foreign Legion in 1917. He transferred to the Aviation Service within the aegis of the Lafayette Flying Corps and gained his Military Flying Brevet, No. 9711 on November 3. Assigned to SPA 157 on January 15, 1918, he gained two victories before going to SPA 163 on June 27. With this unit, he scored five more victories between June 27 and the end of the war.

With the French Air Service, he received the Médaille militaire and Croix de Guerre (4 Palms), and from the United States Army Air Service, the Distinguished Service Cross.

After the war, Connelly he was a businessman in Philadelphia. In 1925, he married Elizabeth Atterbury, daughter of railway magnate General William Wallace Atterbury. He died in Bryn Mawr, Pennsylvania on February 1, 1944.

== Honors and awards ==
- Distinguished Service Cross (DSC), Action Date: September 6, 1918

The President of the United States of America, authorized by Act of Congress, July 9, 1918, takes pleasure in presenting the Distinguished Service Cross to Sergeant James A. Connelly, French Air Service, for extraordinary heroism in action while serving with Lafayette Escadrille, French Air Service, near Suippes, France, 6 September 1918. An American pilot, serving with the French Army, Sergeant-pilot Connelly attacked a formation of twelve enemy planes (Fokker type), shooting down the Flight Commander and forcing the remainder to seek safety. He continued with the unequal combat until his ammunition was exhausted. General Orders: War Department, General Orders No. 50 (1919)

- Médaille militaire (France)

Voluntarily enlisted for the duration of the war, he became indispensable by greatness of his character, his qualities as a pilot, and his complete contempt for danger. On September 6, 1918, he reported his fifth victory by downing an enemy scout. Three Citations

- Croix de Guerre (France)

== See also ==
- List of World War I flying aces from the United States
