= Lufbery circle =

Air combat tactic

The Lufbery circle or Lufbery wheel, also spelled Lufberry or Luffberry, is a defensive air combat tactic first used during World War I.

While its name derives from the name of Raoul Lufbery, the leading fighter ace of the Lafayette Escadrille, he did not invent the tactic; how it acquired this name is not known, although it may be from his popularization of it among the incoming U.S. pilots he trained. In non-American sources it is in fact usually referred to simply as a "defensive circle".

== Description ==
This air tactic can only be mounted by formations of aircraft working together: it involves forming a horizontal circle in the air when attacked, in such a way that the armament of each aircraft offers a measure of protection to the others in the circle. It complicates the task of an attacking fighter – the formation as a whole has far fewer "blind spots" than its members, so that it is more difficult to attack an individual aircraft without being exposed to return fire from the others.

The tactic, evolved in the context of trench warfare, was not used purely defensively:

[The] Lufbery Circle, or follow the leader formation, a great help to each man’s tail. In other words you dive down on a trench, spray it with your guns, and zoom up without worrying much whether a load of nickel jacketed steel is going to crease the seat of your pants. And you don’t worry much because the pilot behind you is taking his turn at spraying the troops in the trench, with the result that they are too occupied with getting out of his way to turn around and blaze away at you as you zoom up. And in the case of the Lufbery Circle, it wouldn’t be healthy for a Hun to try and drop down on the tail of the ship in front of you because you would simply pull up your nose a bit and chew off the soles of his field boots with your bursts.

As the state of the art advanced the technique was increasingly used to enable slower, less capable fighters to cope with attacks by an enemy flying superior types, although it has also sometimes been used by light bomber formations.

== History ==
Perhaps the earliest use of the Lufbery was by formations of F.E.2b aircraft in 1916/17 when in combat with superior German fighters but by the end of World War I it was already considered flawed and obsolete. While generally effective against horizontal attacks by faster aircraft, it was very vulnerable to attacks from fighters diving from above, providing targets on a slow, predictable course. As the performance and armament of fighter aircraft improved during the First World War, they became capable of high-speed hit-and-run attacks in the vertical. A Lufbery put the defenders at a gross disadvantage.

In World War II the Lufbery was still used by many countries, generally as a last resort measure for poorly trained pilots of less advanced air forces – for instance, Japanese kamikaze pilots. Faster Allied aircraft resulted in the more maneuverable Zero also resorting to the tactic to lure opponents into a turning contest in which the Zero could prevail. This tactic was also used by German Messerschmitt Bf 110 fighters, which had a rearwards-firing dorsal gun position, and British Boulton Paul Defiant fighters, with dorsal turrets, during the Battle of Britain.

To counter German fighter attacks, the Allied pilots flew "Lufbery circles" (in which each aircraft's tail was covered by the friendly aircraft behind). The tactic was effective and dangerous as a pilot attacking this formation could find himself constantly in the sights of the opposing pilots. As a counter-measure to such circles, Hans-Joachim Marseille often dived at high speed into the middle of these defensive formations from either above or below, executing a tight turn and firing a two-second deflection shot to destroy an enemy aircraft. The successes Marseille had become readily apparent in early 1942. He claimed his 37–40th victories on 8 February 1942 and 41–44th victories four days later which earned him the Knight's Cross of the Iron Cross that same month for 46 victories.

Soviet Il-2 ground-attack aircraft used the Lufbery circle on the Eastern Front.

Lundstrom, in chronicling the operational history of US carrier-based activities in the Pacific from Pearl Harbor through the Battle of Midway, provides an extensive discussion of fighter tactics of the time. In the Battle of the Coral Sea, US Grumman F4F Wildcats defending the USS Lexington against Japanese dive bombers adopted a Lufbery Circle when attacked by A6M Zeros.

Although the Lufbery would seem to expose modern aircraft to missiles and unchecked gunnery passes, US pilots in the Vietnam War found North Vietnamese MiG-17 fighters using it as bait for faster F-4 Phantom fighters that did not have guns and could not use their missiles because of tight turns made by the MiGs.

== Other uses of the term ==
Mostly in World War II literature, a Lufbery Circle can be used to refer to any turning engagement between aircraft, i.e. what is more properly known as the Turn Fight in air combat tactics.

In modern discussions of air-to-air combat tactics, a "Lufbery" generally refers to any prolonged horizontal engagement between two fighters with neither gaining the advantage. This frequently occurs when both fighters have descended to low altitude and have insufficient energy for further vertical maneuvering, thus restricting the fight to the horizontal plane. Such a fight assumes that one fighter does not have a significant turn rate advantage and is thus locked in a seemingly endless tail chase.

Such a fight is said to wind up in a Lufbery or has said to have "Luffed out"; this being a generally undesirable circumstance as neither fighter is able to conclude the fight nor leave without potentially exposing himself to attack by the remaining fighter.
