= Charles Gossage Grey =

American WW! flying ace (1894–1987)

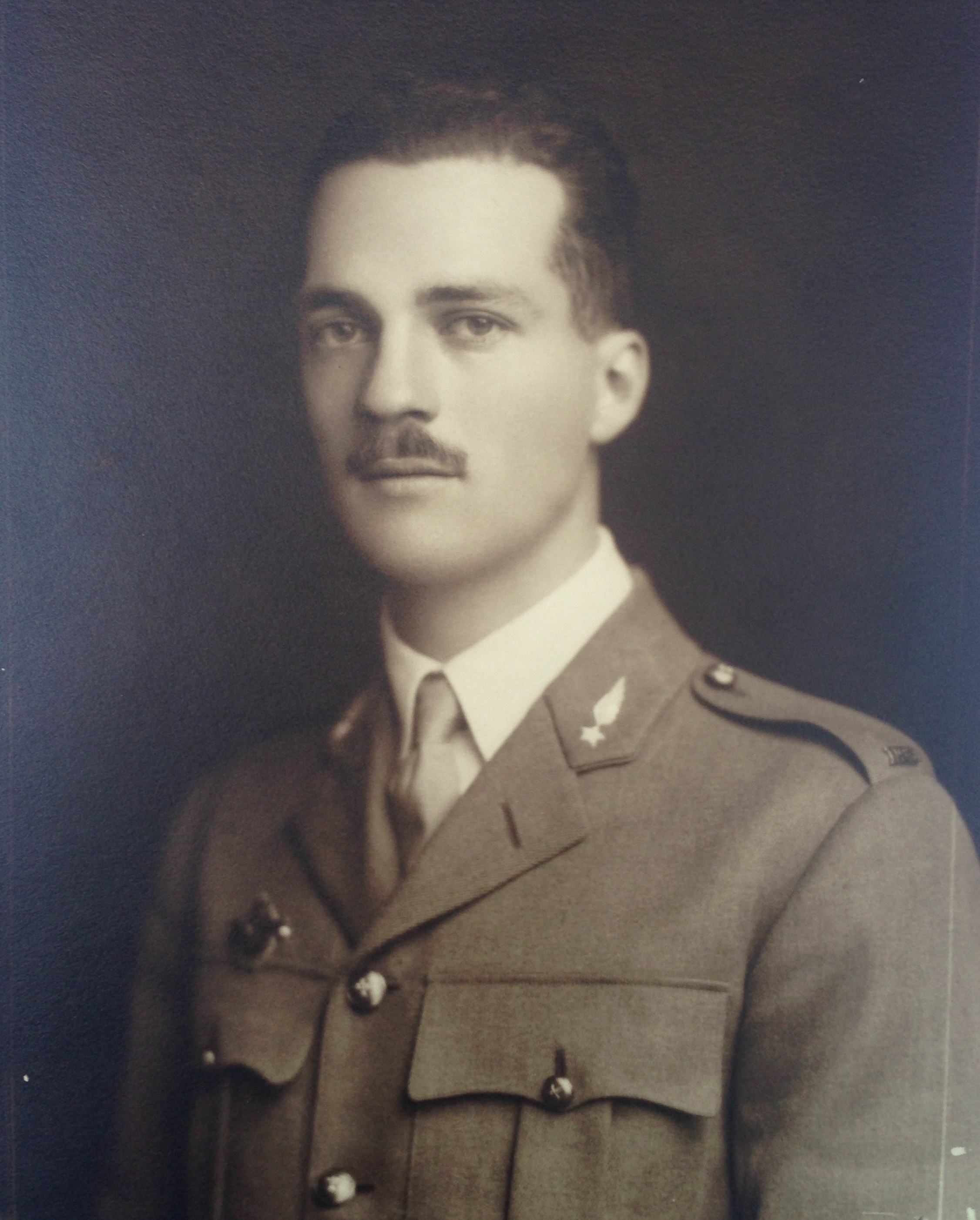
- Captain Charles Gossage Grey, 1918
- Born: June 20, 1894; Chicago, Illinois
- Died: March 6, 1987 (aged 92); Palm Beach, Florida
- Burial place: Paris, France
- Relatives: Between World War I and World War II, Business and Banking. WWII: Volunteer MI-6, OSS, French resistance Réseau F-2. Post World War II: CIA until retirement, 1961.
- Military career
- Allegiance: France; United States
- Branch: Aéronautique Militaire (France); Air Service, United States Army
- Service years: 1917–1919
- Rank: Captain
- Nickname: Charley
- Units: Aéronautique Militaire: Escadrille SPA.93; Lafayette Flying Corps; Air Service, United States Army: 213th Aero Squadron
- Conflicts: World War I World War II
- Awards: (United States) American Field Service Medal (United States) Distinguished Service Cross (France) Aeronautical Medal (France) Legion of Honour (France) Resistance Medal (Poland) Golden Cross of Merit; Order of the White Rose of Finland (England) King's Medal for Courage

Captain Charles Gossage Grey (June 20, 1894 – March 6, 1987) was an American World War I flying ace credited with five aerial victories. He remained in France after World War I. During World War II, he joined the Office of Strategic Services and served with the French Resistance. He continued in U. S. civil service until his retirement in 1961.

== Early life pre World War I ==
Charles Gossage Grey was born in Chicago, Illinois, on 20 June 1894, the son of Charles Scott, and he was later adopted by his stepfather Walter C. Grey. He attended Columbia University School of Journalism, and subsequently was a reporter with the Chicago Evening Post.

== World War I ==
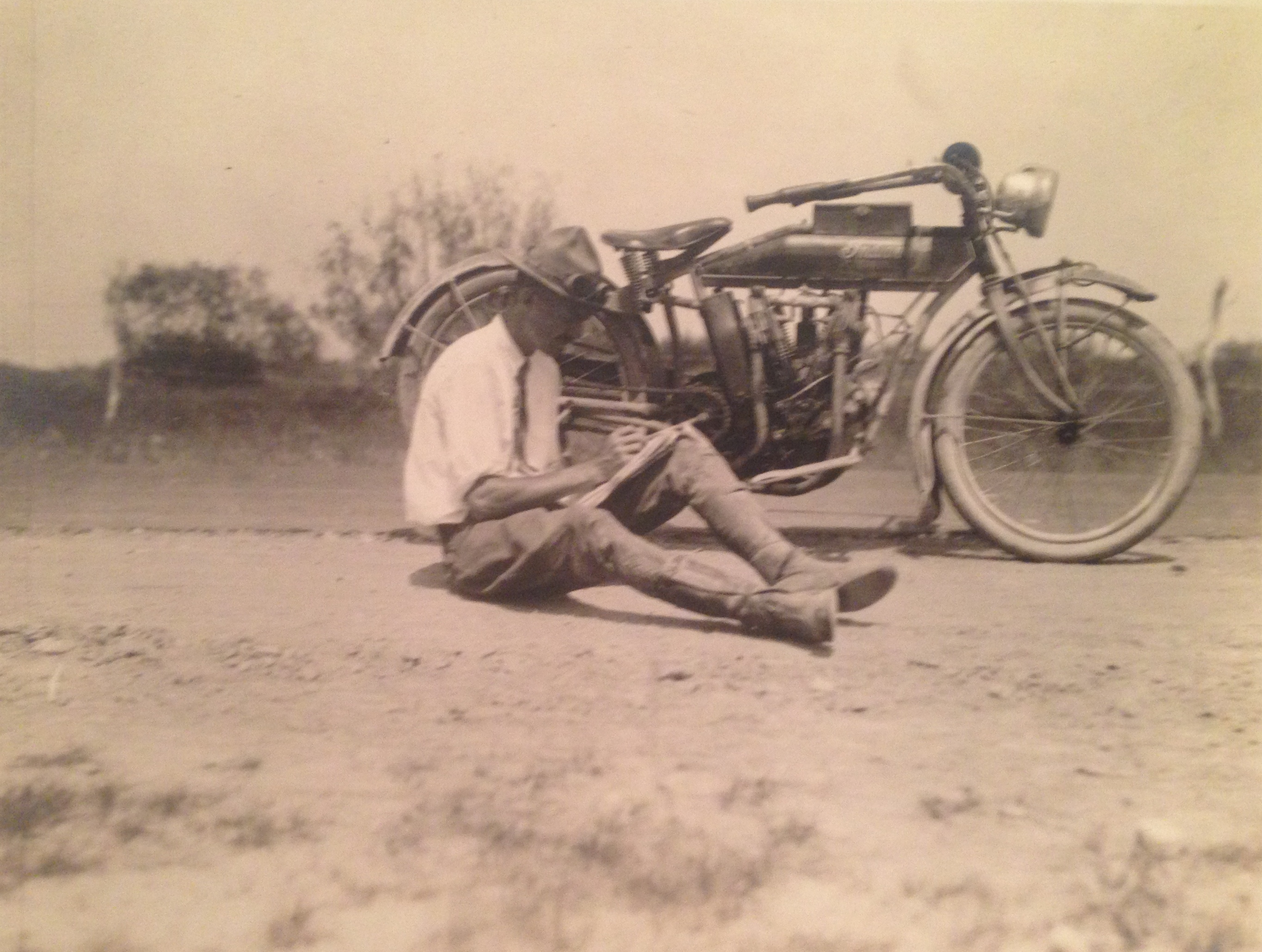
1916-17 Mexican Border War, Grey reporting for The Chicago Evening Post"

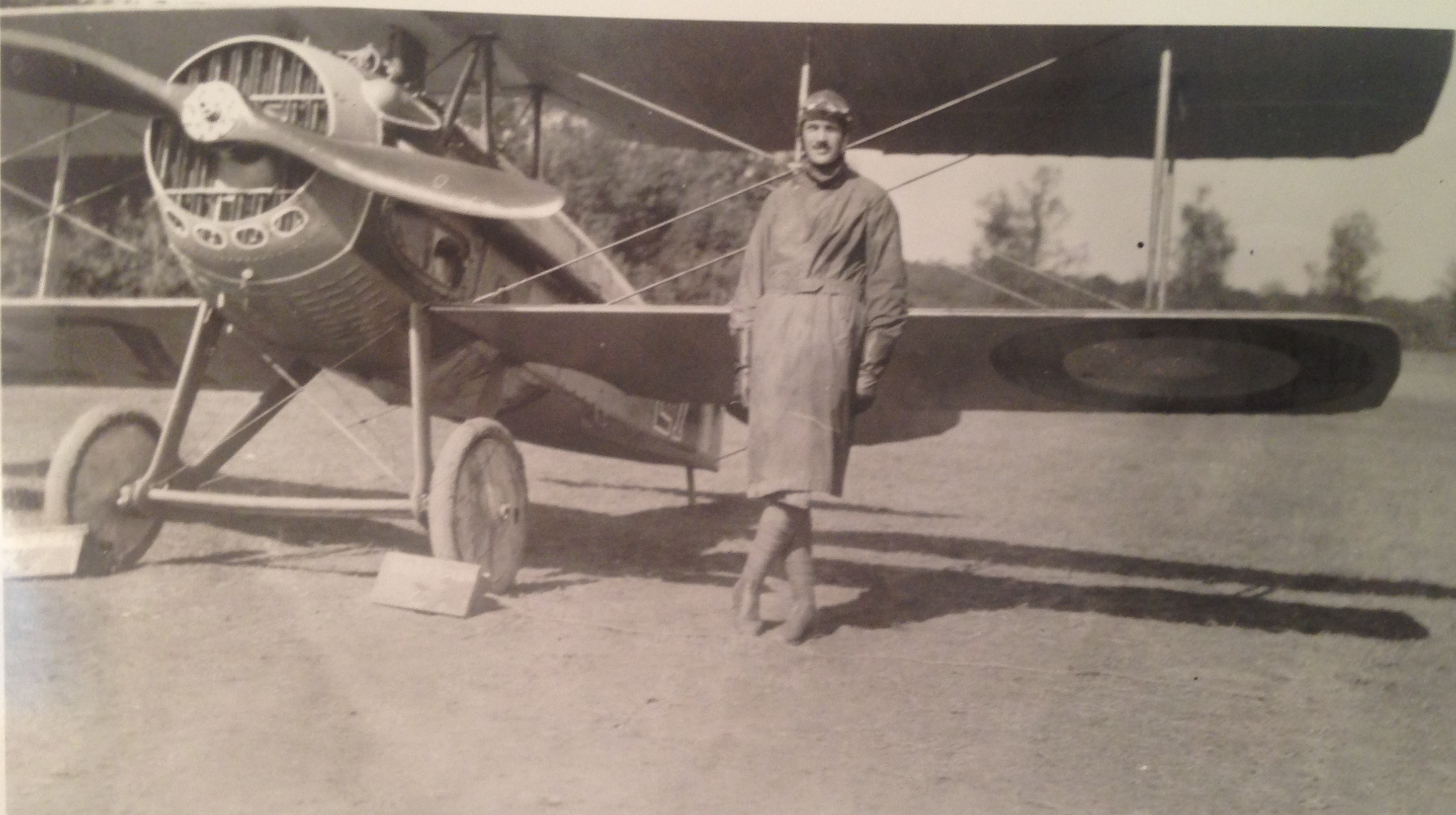
LT Charles G. Grey Flight Commander 3rd Flight 213th Squadron, 3rd Pursuit Group, Vaucouleurs, France, September 1918

In February 1917 he volunteered his services with the American Ambulance Field Services in France, and in June of that year enlisted into the French Foreign Legion. He obtained his military flying license on September 29, 1917. He was then assigned to the Escadrille Spad 93 Lafayette Flying Corps as sergeant, where he remained until March 1918. Promoted lieutenant, he was then commissioned into U. S. service and assigned to the 213th Aero Squadron on 1 August 1918 as Flight Commander of its third flight. Between 2 September and 3 November 1918, he used his Spad XIII to score five aerial victories (ace). He was promoted to captain on 6 November 1918.

The Distinguished Service Cross was presented to Grey, for "extraordinary heroism" in action near Montmedy, France, November 4, 1918. While leading a patrol of three machines, Captain Grey observed a formation of our bombing planes hard pressed by 12 of the enemy. He attacked the leading enemy machine without hesitation, thereby attracting the enemy's fire and allowing the bombing machines to escape undamaged.

== Post World War I ==
Grey remained in France after World War I, involved mostly in private business and banking. In 1935 he married Cornelia O'Connor Wallace, born in Paris, France, on May 22, 1904, the daughter of James Charles O'Connor of Dallas, Texas, and Ivor Branch Tate, sister of J. Waddy Tate. Charles and Cornelia had two sons, James, born in 1936, and Michael, in 1939.

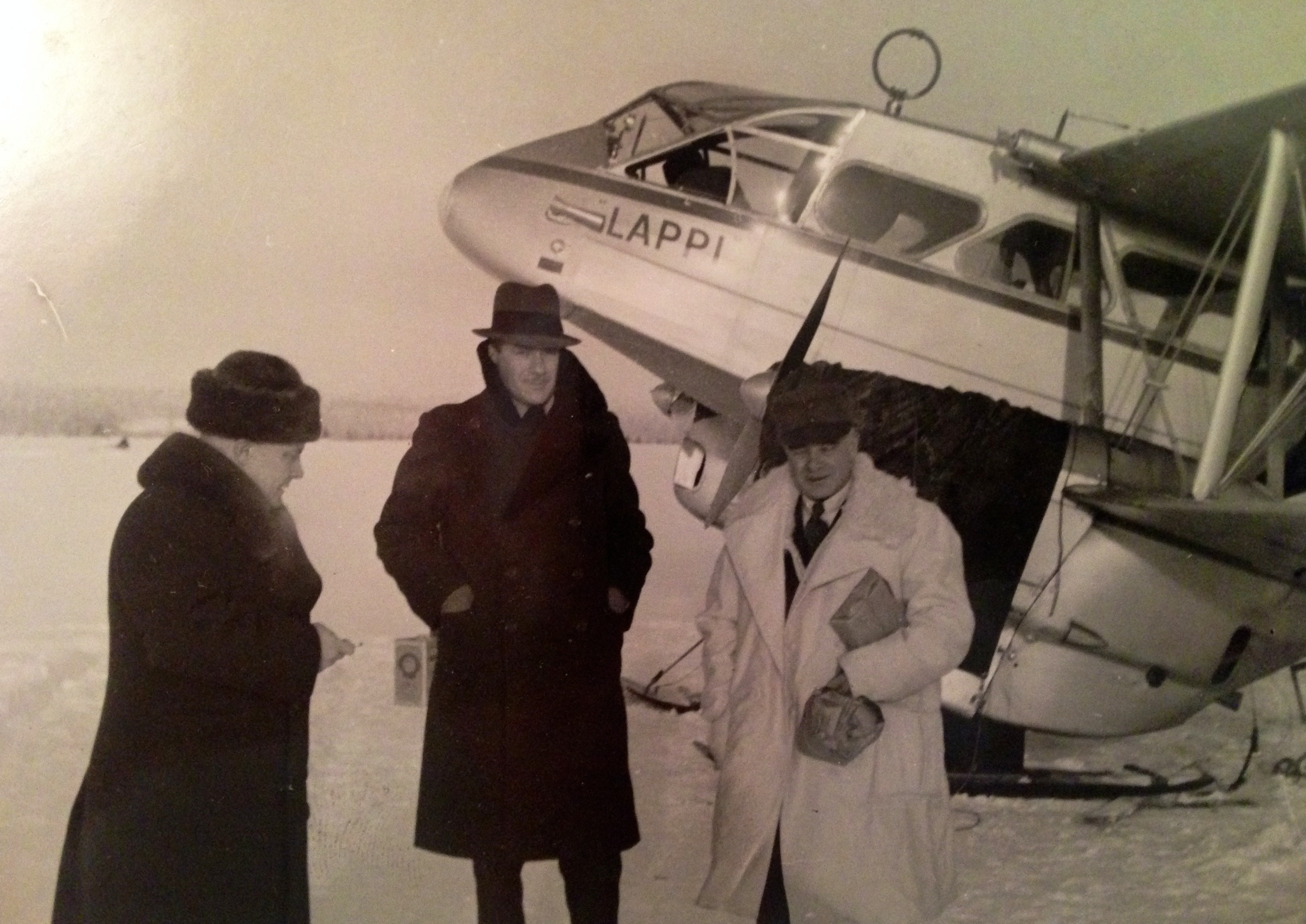
Charles Gossage Grey in Finland standing in front of an aircraft flanked by two Finnish government officials

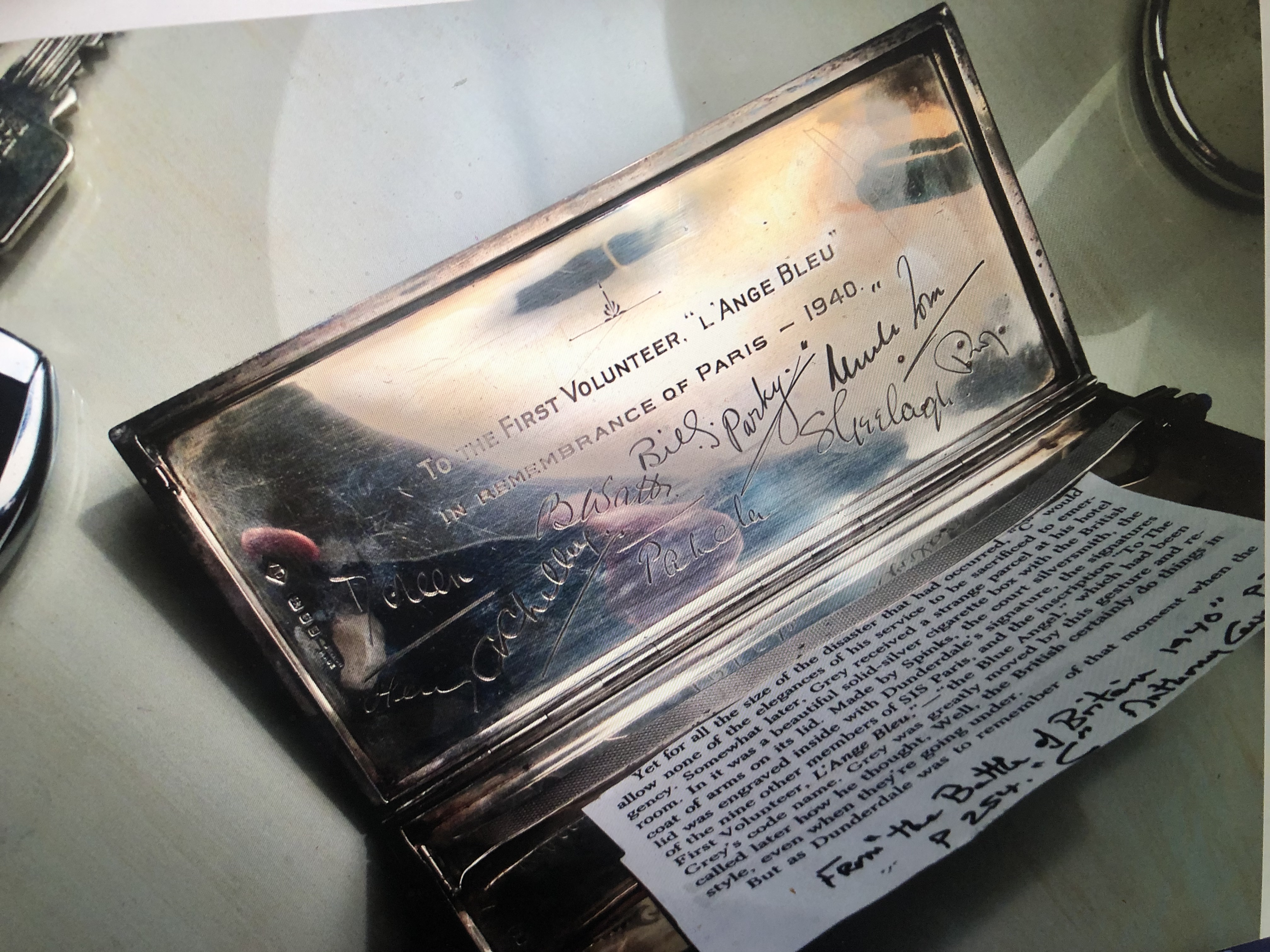
Inscribed cigarette case gift by members of MI-6 SIS team Paris, France 1940

== World War II ==
At the outset of World War II, the Grey family remained in France. Both Charles and Cornelia were dismayed by the isolationist stance of the United States in the face of the German onslaught across the European continent, and they immediately volunteered their services in the defense of their country of adoption, not withstanding their U.S. citizenship. Cornelia joined I.P.S.A. (Infermières, Pilotes, Secouristes de l'Air), as a nurse and ambulance driver, active on the front and under fire during the German offensive of Northern France in June 1940, for which services she was attributed the "Croix de Guerre' citation. Charles Grey volunteered his service to MI-6, the British Secret Intelligence Service, under the code name of "L'ange Bleu", and was known as "The First Volunteer". Activities included organizing the evacuation of SIS station in Paris, and its commanders "Biffy Dunderdale" and Sir Peter Smithers June 14–23, 1940, via Bordeaux. After the armistice, in late 1940, the family moved to the United States by way of Spain and Portugal. In 1942 Grey became an early member of the Office of Strategic Services, and was active in its X-2 counter espionage division, based in Lisbon Portugal. He was also active in various capacities in Finland (Red Cross), Poland, North Africa, and in France where he was a member of the F-2 "Forces Françaises Combattantes" resistance network under code name "Gris". His World War II service earned him a number of citations including the French Legion of Honor and Resistance Medal, the Polish Golden Cross of Merit., the Order of the White Rose of Finland, and the King's Medal for Courage from Britain.

== Post World War II ==
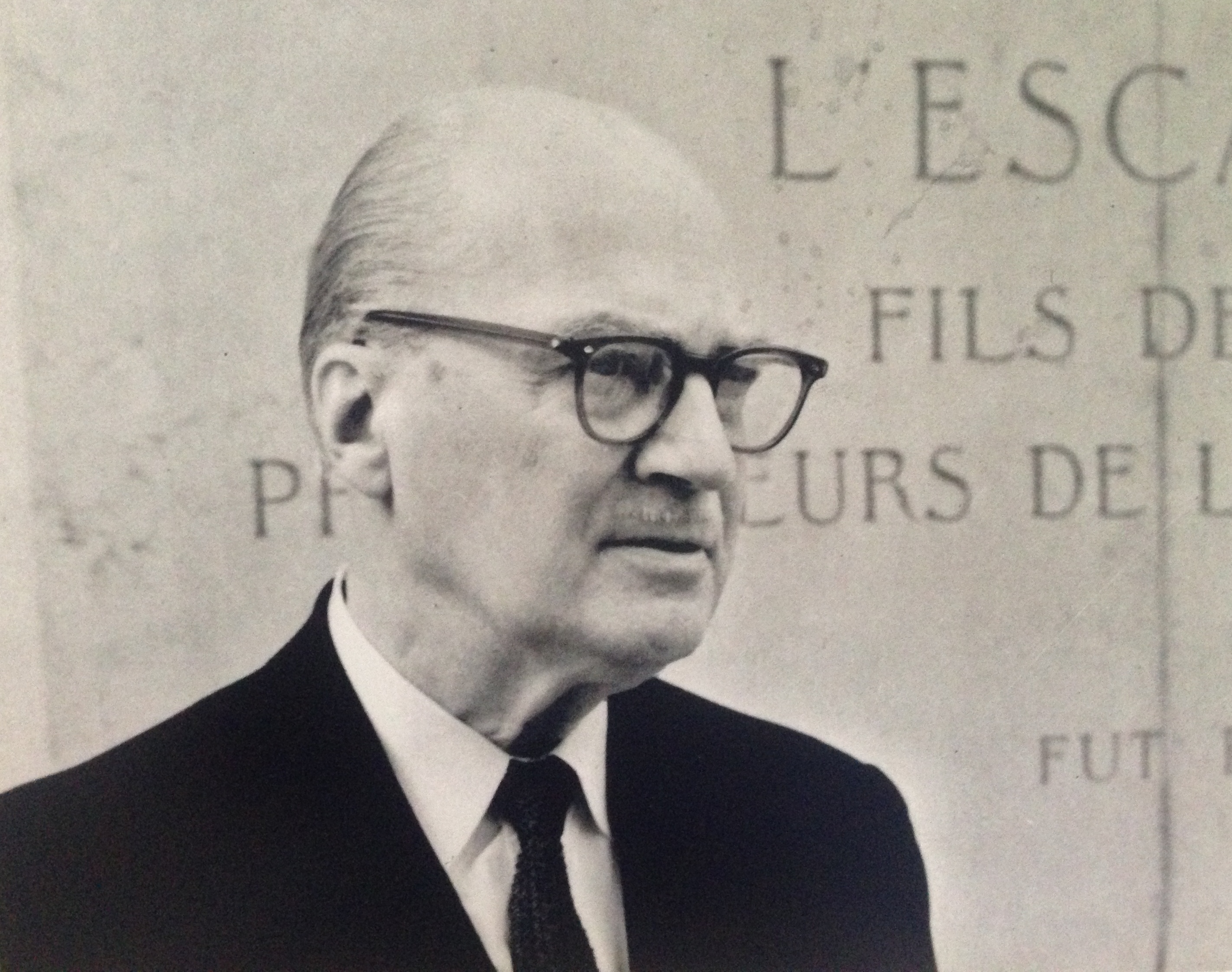
Charles Grey, President "L'Association de l'Escadrille Lafayette" 1982.

Immediately following the liberation of Paris in 1944, the Grey family returned to their home there. Grey remained in U. S. diplomatic service in France, until his retirement in 1961. Following his divorce from Cornelia, Grey married Ivanka Boyovitch on July 8, 1960. Following his retirement, Grey remained a resident of Paris for the rest of his life. He returned to the United States periodically for family visits. On 20 February 1987, he was struck by a car in Manalapan, Florida. He died of his injuries at JFK Hospital in Atlantis, Florida on 6 March 1987, and was interred in Paris, in the Cimetière de Montparnasse.

== See also ==
- List of World War I flying aces from the United States

== Bibliography ==
- Franks, Norman (2001). American aces of World War I. Oxford: Osprey Aviation. ISBN 978-1-84176-375-0.
- Bailey, Norman L.R. Franks & Frank W. (1992). Over the front : a complete record of the fighter aces and units of the United States and French air services, 1914-1918 (Reprint. ed.). London: Grub Street. ISBN 978-0-948817-54-0.
