= Edwin Charles Parsons =

United States Navy admiral

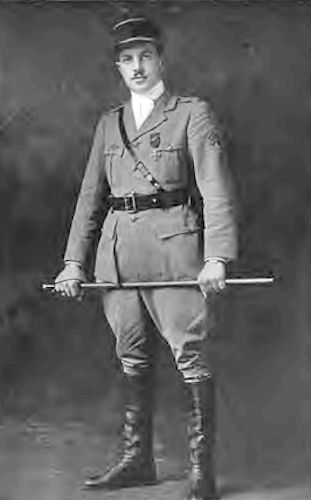
- Edwin Charles Parsons, 1918
- Born: September 24, 1892; Holyoke, Massachusetts, US
- Died: May 2, 1968 (aged 75); Sarasota, Florida, US
- Burial place: Arlington National Cemetery, Arlington, Virginia, Section 30, Lot 1698 LH,
- Military career
- Allegiance: United States
- Branch: French Foreign Legion; Aéronautique Militaire (France); Air Service, United States Army; United States Navy
- Service years: 1915–1918; 1934–1945
- Rank: Rear Admiral
- Nickname: Ted
- Units: Aéronautique Militaire: Escadrille N.124 (Lafayette Escadrille); Escadrille SPA.3
- Conflicts: World War I World War II; Mexican Revolution
- Awards: Legion d'Honneur (France); Médaille militaire (France); Croix de Guerre (France); Order of Leopold II (Belgium); Croix de Guerre (Belgium)
- Other work: FBI agent, author, and naval officer

Edwin Charles Parsons (September 24, 1892 – May 2, 1968) was a Rear Admiral of the United States Navy, and former French Foreign Legionnaire, flying ace, Hollywood aviation technical advisor, FBI Special Agent, and author.

== Early life ==
Born in Holyoke, Massachusetts, Parsons graduated from Phillips Exeter Academy in 1910 and after attending the University of Pennsylvania, moved to California, where he learned to fly at Dominguez Field, Carson, in 1912, then spent 1913–1915 in the Mexican Army's Aviation Corps. At one point, Pancho Villa wanted him to train airmen; however, Villa's raid on Columbus, New Mexico scotched Parsons' interest.

Parsons was brevetted by Villa as a Captain at a salary of $200 per month, payable in gold. Parsons' attempt to teach some of Villa's cavalrymen to fly foundered on their lack of mechanical ability. Parsons also is reported to have been responsible for purchasing and later flying a Curtiss Model D two-seated pusher, as well as fetching needed parts from El Paso. Parsons departed as the Mexican Revolutionary movement split between Villa and Venustiano Carranza.

== World War I ==
Thus Parsons was an experienced combat pilot when the war began. In late 1915, he traveled to France. He served with the United States Ambulance service before enlisting in the French Foreign Legion. In 1916, he became a pilot in the Aéronautique Militaire (French Air Service) and, beginning in January 1917, he flew with the famed Lafayette Escadrille. He was credited with one victory and flew many times as Raoul Lufbery's wingman.

He later elected to stay in the French air service instead of transferring to the USAAS when his unit was Americanized in February 1918. He was assigned to the French squadron SPA3 in 1918 where he was credited with an additional 7 victories for a total of 8 victories confirmed. Parsons was a tangential figure in a spectacular performance on May 9. It was sparked by a disagreement between René Fonck on one hand, and Parsons and his friend Frank Baylies on the other. Although Fonck's three dozen victories spoke for themselves, the American duo believed that the Frenchman's attitude in his actual speech was atrocious. Perturbed by Fonck's highhanded lectures on aerial success, the two Americans bet Fonck a bottle of champagne that one of them would shoot down an enemy plane before Fonck. Baylies took off despite hazy weather and shot down a Halberstadt CL.II. Back at the airfield, rather than pay off the bet, a sulky Fonck badgered the Americans to change the terms of the bet to whoever shot down the most Germans that day would win. Lingering fog kept Fonck grounded most of the day. It was well into the afternoon before it cleared enough for him to take off at 1500 hours. Between 1600 and 1605 hours, he shot down three enemy two-seater reconnaissance planes. A couple of hours later, he repeated the feat. Understanding the importance of reconnaissance planes, with their potential to direct intensive artillery fire onto French troops, Fonck concentrated his attentions upon them; six shot down within a three-hour span proved it.

== List of aerial victories ==
See also Aerial victory standards of World War I

Confirmed victories are numbered and listed chronologically. Unconfirmed victories are denoted by "u/c" and may or may not be listed by date.

No.	Date/time	Aircraft	Foe	Result	Location	Notes
1	September 4, 1917 @ 0940 hours	Nieuport	Rumpler reconnaissance plane	Destroyed	Neuilly	
2	May 6, 1918 @ 1715 hours	Spad	German two-seater	Destroyed	West of Montdidier	
3	May 16, 1918 @ 0945 hours	Spad	German two-seater	Destroyed	Montdidier	
4	May 19, 1918 @ 1220 hours	Spad	German two-seater	Destroyed	Montdidier	Shared victory with two French pilots
5	May 20, 1918 @ 0915 hours	Spad	German two-seater	Destroyed	Gratibus	
6	August 26, 1918	Spad	Fokker D.VII	Destroyed	Morchain	
7	September 26, 1918 @ 1800 hours	Spad	German two-seater	Destroyed	South of Tahure	Victory shared with Pierre Pendaries and another French pilot
8	October 1, 1918 @ 1510 hours	Spad	German two-seater	Destroyed	Somme-Py	

== Between the World Wars ==
When the war ended, Parsons returned to the United States and joined the Federal Bureau of Investigation as a Special Agent from 1920 to 1923, but left to form his own unsuccessful private detective agency.

With the help the film director and former World War I aviator William A. Wellman, Parsons was hired by Paramount as a technical consultant, working on the Oscar-winning Wings (1927), and on Howard Hughes epic Hell's Angels (1930), amongst others. Parsons also worked as a screenwriter, occasional actor, and technical director. He wrote articles for magazines, as well as authoring a book. He also wrote and narrated a radio series about his experiences, Heroes of the Lafayette. Whilst in Hollywood in the mid-1930s he was a member of the Hollywood Hussars militia cavalry unit.

== World War II ==
Having joined the Naval Reserve in 1934, during World War II Parsons was an instructor at Pensacola Naval Air Station, and served aboard an aircraft carrier and a seaplane tender, and took part in the Solomon Islands campaign, earning the Bronze Star among other decorations. He joined the Navy as a Lieutenant Commander and ended the war as a Rear Admiral.

The French government awarded him the Légion d'honneur in 1961. He died at 75 in 1968, the last of the Lafayette Escadrille flying aces, and is buried at Arlington National Cemetery.

== See also ==
- List of World War I flying aces from the United States

== Bibliography ==
- Edwin C. Parsons, The Great Adventure: The Story of the Lafayette Escadrille. Doubleday, Doran & Company, Inc., 1937.
  - Also published as I Flew With the Lafayette Escadrille. E. C. Seale, 1963.
- Edwin C. Parsons, Flight into Hell: The Story of the Lafayette Escadrille. J. Long, Limited, 1938.
- Harry Dempsey, American Aces of World War 1. Osprey Publishing, 2001. ISBN 978-1-84176-375-0.
- Dan Hagedorn, Conquistadors of the Sky: A History of Aviation in Latin America. University Press of Florida, 2008. ISBN 978-0-8130-3249-8.
- Jon Guttman, SPAD XII/XIII aces of World War I.Osprey Publishing, 2002. ISBN 978-1841763163.
