= Dudley Gilman Tucker =

American military pilot (1887–1918)

- Born: Dudley Gilman Tucker; April 7, 1887; New York City, New York, United States
- Died: July 8, 1918 (aged 31); Louatre, France
- Occupation: Aviator
- Years active: 1917-1918

Dudley Gilman Tucker (April 7, 1887 - July 8, 1918) was an American aviator in World War I.

== Biography ==
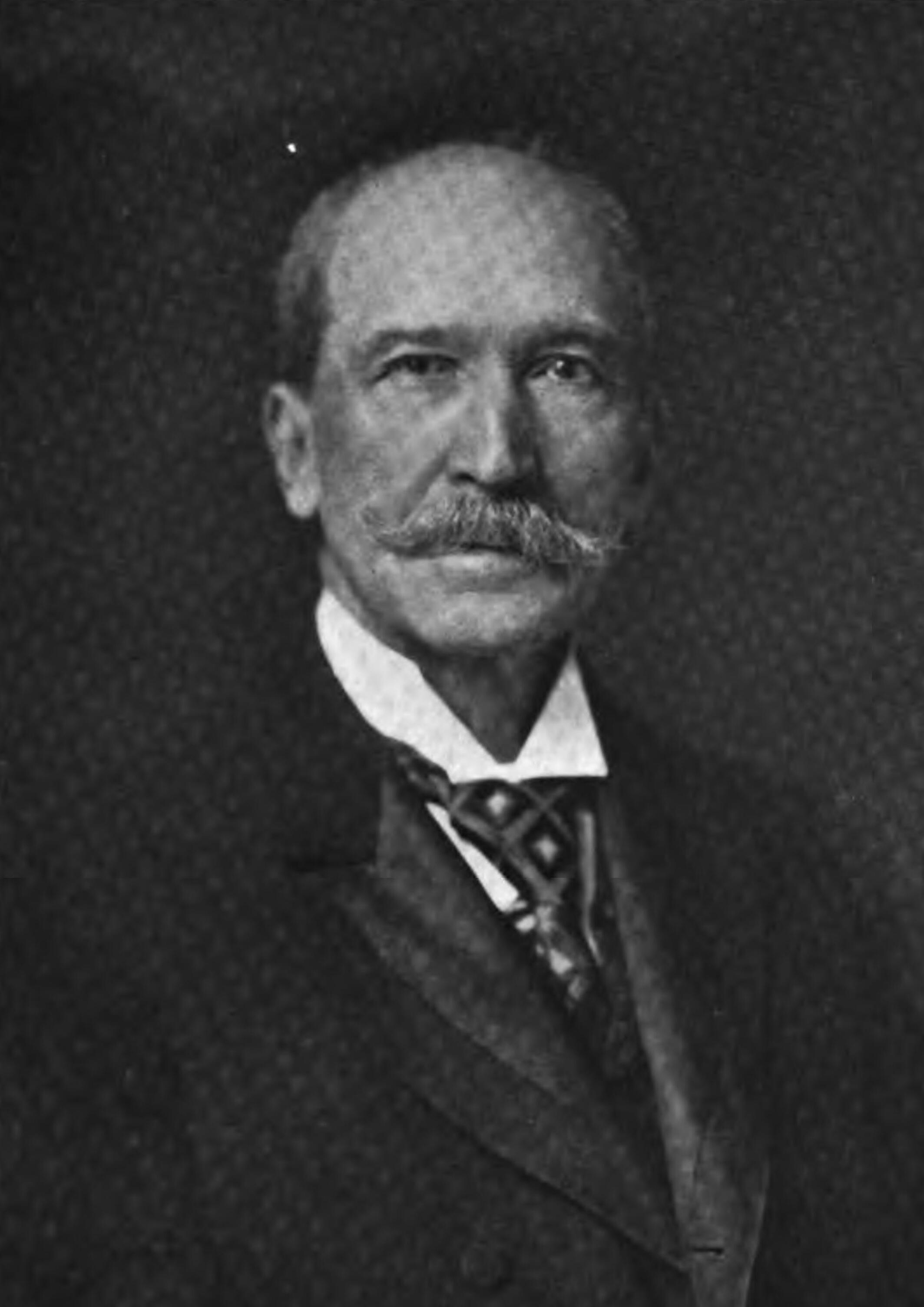
Tucker's father Gilman H. Tucker

Tucker was born in New York City, April 7, 1887. His parents were Gilman Henry Tucker, secretary of the American Book Company and Caroline Low (Kimball) Tucker. He was a descendant of Massachusetts colonial era governor Thomas Dudley.

Tucker graduated from Harvard University in 1907 and attended Columbia Law School but dropped out to work for the American Book Company for five years. He then became business manager of the Washington Square Players. In 1917, while on his way to China and Japan with a friend, Austen "Billy" Parker, to study traditional Asian theater, he became stranded in Panama, unable to find passage on any of the ships transiting the Panama Canal because of shipping diversions due to demands of the First World War, he and Parker decided to head for France to join the war effort.

On March 28, 1917, Tucker joined the French Foreign Legion, but only a few weeks later in April he transferred to the Lafayette Flying Corps. From May 22, 1917 to January 26, 1918, he was in training at the aviation schools of Avord, Pau, and Le Plessis-Belleville, being breveted pilot (Caudron) and promoted to corporal on September 30, 1917, and attaining a record as a skillful and courageous pilot. On January 28, 1918 he was sent to the front, assigned first to Escadrille Spad 74, transferring later to Spad 15 in the Groupe de Combat 13. In June he was promoted to sergeant. On July 8 he was part of a routine patrol of five Spads when they encountered 15 German Fokkers in the Soissons and Chateau-Thierry area. The other four returned to base but Tucker was reported missing. He was found with the wreckage of his plane in a field along the Longpont-Chaudun road or on a battlefield at Vierzy - the German records are incomplete. He died of his wounds and after the war his body was identified and buried in an American war cemetery at Seringes-et-Nesle.
