= David Guy =

American military aviator (1897–1960)

- Born: David Wade Guy; September 28, 1897; St. Louis, Missouri
- Died: May 28, 1960 (aged 62); Bryn Mawr, Pennsylvania
- Military career
- Allegiance: United States
- Service years: 1917-1919
- Rank: First lieutenant
- Units: American Field Service; Aeronautique Militaire; U.S. Army Air Service
- Conflicts: World War I

David Wade Guy (1897–1960) was an American military aviator. Guy flew biplanes for both France's Aeronautique Militaire and the U.S. Army Air Service during World War I. He served in the Lafayette Flying Corps, a group of 180 American pilots who flew for France.

== Early life and pre-war education ==
Guy was born in St. Louis, Missouri, to William Evans Guy and Katherine B. Lemoine Guy on September 28, 1897. He had two siblings: William Edwin Guy and Catherine Lemoine Guy. Guy's father, William Evans Guy, was a Civil War veteran; he served with the 86th Ohio Infantry in the Union Army. Guy's grandfather, David Everett Wade, served in the American Revolutionary War after growing up in Northern New Jersey. He then helped found Cincinnati after traveling west to Ohio by boat in 1790. Wade constructed the first Presbyterian Church in Cincinnati and served as a deacon and elder. He also served as a founding trustee of Cincinnati College (now the University of Cincinnati) and as a county commissioner, township officer, councilman, and first alderman.

In 1915, Guy graduated from Morristown School (now Morristown-Beard School) in Morristown, New Jersey. He then studied at Princeton University in Princeton, New Jersey between the fall of 1915 and February 1917 before leaving for Europe to serve in World War I.

== War service and aviation achievements ==
Guy served as an ambulance driver with the American Field Service (AFS) from February to July 1917. He drove ambulances in Verdun, France for battles at Hill 304 (S.S.U. 15) and le Mort Homme. Guy also served in the AFS unit that carried the American flag to the front. After his AFS service, he joined France's Aeronautique Militaire on July 21, 1917. Guy studied at several French flying schools between August and November; he attended flying schools in Tours, Avord, Pau, and G.D.E. He then began serving with Aeronautique Militaire units, including SPAD biplane units 155, 156, and 38. Guy received a promotion to corporal in September 1917 and then sergeant in May 1918.

In July 1918, Guy shot down a German Rumpler reconnaissance plane: "I chased a biplace Rumpler down from 5300 meters, and hit him so that he fell between the lines. He put three bullets in my plane—it was my only official victory." (Guy had also shot down a Rumpler over Joncherey, France, but the confirmation was unofficial because Guy was not present to confirm it.) This action earned Guy the Croix de Guerre with palm and citation from France on July 29.

On November 7, 1918, Guy left the Aeronautique Militaire to join the U.S. Army Air Service with the rank of first lieutenant. He served with the 1st Aero Squadron. Guy served in the Army of Occupation in Trier, Germany, from November 20, 1918, to January 5, 1919. Returning to the U.S. in April, Guy received a discharge from the Army at Mitchel Air Force Base in Hempstead Plains on Long Island on April 14, 1919. After World War I, Guy co-founded the National Aeronautical Association's Flying Club of Philadelphia, and he served as its first president.

== Post-war education and career ==
Following the end of the war, Guy resumed his college studies at the Massachusetts Institute of Technology in Cambridge, Massachusetts. He received his bachelor's degree in chemical engineering in 1922. Following graduation, Guy worked for Monsanto Company, a chemical company in Missouri, and then Ingersoll Rand, an Irish industrial company with an American headquarters in Davidson, North Carolina. After working at the First Pennsylvania Banking and Trust Company in Philadelphia, he co-founded Wellington Foundation and served as their president. The foundation sold Wellington Funds, a type of mutual fund.
