= Frank Leaman Baylies =

American World War I flying ace

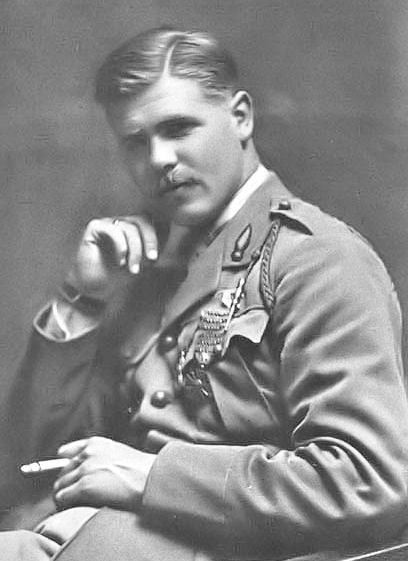
- Frank Leaman Baylies
- Born: September 23, 1895; New Bedford, Massachusetts
- Died: June 17, 1918 (aged 22); Between Rollot and Arvillers
- Military career
- Allegiance: United States; France
- Branch: Aéronautique Militaire (France)
- Service years: 1916–1918
- Rank: Lieutenant
- Units: Aéronautique Militaire: Escadrille SPA.73; Escadrille SPA.3
- Conflicts: World War I
- Awards: Légion d'honneur, Médaille militaire, Croix de Guerre

Lieutenant Frank Leaman Baylies (23 September 1895—17 June 1918) was an American World War I flying ace credited with twelve aerial victories while flying in the French Aeronautique Militaire. Having originally volunteered for the Ambulance Corps, Baylies transferred into French aviation in May 1917. After scoring his 12 victories with the French, he transferred into American aviation service but remained with the French until his death in action.

== Early life and ground service ==
Baylies was the son of Lydia Terry Paige and Charles S. Baylies. He was born on 23 September 1895 in New Bedford, Massachusetts. He was educated in Providence, Rhode Island, first at Jerih Swift High School, then at Moses Brown School.

== Ground service ==
Baylies volunteered for the Ambulance Corps in May 1916 and originally saw service on the Western Front and in Serbia and Salonika. In March 1917, he was awarded a Croix de Guerre for evacuating the wounded under fire. After being given a joy ride by a French aviator, Baylies volunteered for aviation training. He was rejected by the American air service because of substandard vision. Baylies joined French aviation instead, in May 1917. It turned out he had a natural flair for piloting.

== Success in aerial service ==
=== Initial service ===
His initial posting, on November 17, 1917, was to Escadrille 73 as a Corporal; he was the 13th member of the squadron, and was assigned airplane number 13. As Baylies wrote home: "Cannot afford to be superstitious." A month later, he was reassigned to Escadrille 3 to be a Spad pilot. Beginning on February 19, 1918, and stretching to 31 May, he scored a dozen victories, two of which were shared with André Dubonnet. He also survived being shot down on March 28; after landing in no man's land, he rescued the altimeter and watch from the wreckage and outran a detachment of German infantry to the nearby French trenches.

=== What price champagne? ===
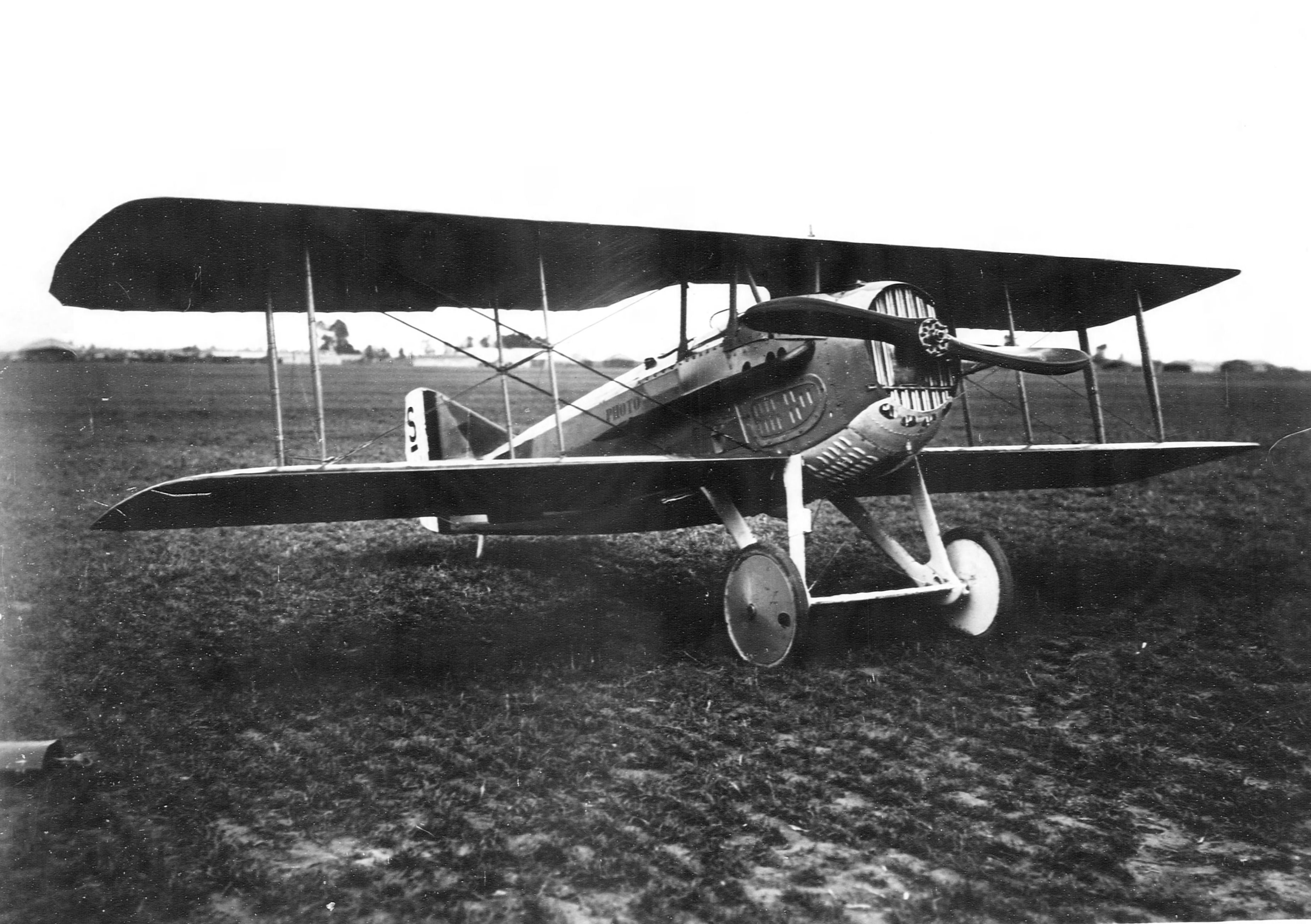
Baylies flew a SPAD S.XIII such as this for Escadrille 3.

Then came a spectacular performance on 9 May. It was sparked by a disagreement between René Fonck on one hand, and Baylies and his friend Edwin C. Parsons on the other. Although Fonck's three dozen victories spoke for themselves, the American duo believed that his attitudes in his actual speech was atrocious. Perturbed by Fonck's highhanded lectures on aerial success, the two Americans bet Fonck a bottle of champagne that one of them would shoot down an enemy plane before Fonck. Baylies took off despite hazy weather and shot down a Halberstadt CL.II. Back at the airfield, rather than pay off the bet, a sulky Fonck badgered the Americans to change the terms of the bet to whoever shot down the most Germans that day would win. Lingering fog kept Fonck grounded most of the day. It was well into the afternoon before it cleared enough for him to take off at 1500 hours. Between 1600 and 1605 hours, he shot down three enemy two-seater reconnaissance planes. A couple of hours later, he repeated the feat. Understanding the importance of reconnaissance planes, with their potential to direct intensive artillery fire onto French troops, Fonck concentrated his attentions upon them; six shot down within a three-hour span proved it.

== Death in action ==
Baylies eventually accepted a U. S. commission, but never left his assignment with the French. He was killed in action dogfighting Fokker Triplanes from Jasta 19 on 17 June 1918. Baylies and his wingmen tried to join a formation of rotary engined fighters in the belief they were British Sopwiths. At the last moment, he realized they were Fokker Dr.I triplane fighters; he stood his SPAD XII on a wingtip and turned away. Three of the Germans dived on him. He looped in behind one, but the fourth Fokker in turn dove on him and shot him down. One wingman, André Dubonnet, went down in the same engagement but survived while François Macari just managed to escape. German ace Rudolf Reinau is usually credited as Baylies' victor.

== See also ==
- List of World War I flying aces from the United States

== Bibliography ==
- American Aces of World War 1 Harry Dempsey. Osprey Publishing, 2001. ISBN 1-84176-375-6, ISBN 978-1-84176-375-0.
- Over the Front: A Complete Record of the Fighter Aces and Units of the United States and French Air Services, 1914–1918 Norman L. R. Franks, Frank W. Bailey. Grub Street, 1992. ISBN 0-948817-54-2, ISBN 978-0-948817-54-0.
- SPAD XII/XIII Aces of World War I. Jon Guttman. Osprey Publishing, 2002. ISBN 1-84176-316-0, ISBN 978-1-84176-316-3.
