= Raoul Lufbery =

French-American fighter pilot

Gervais Raoul Victor Lufbery
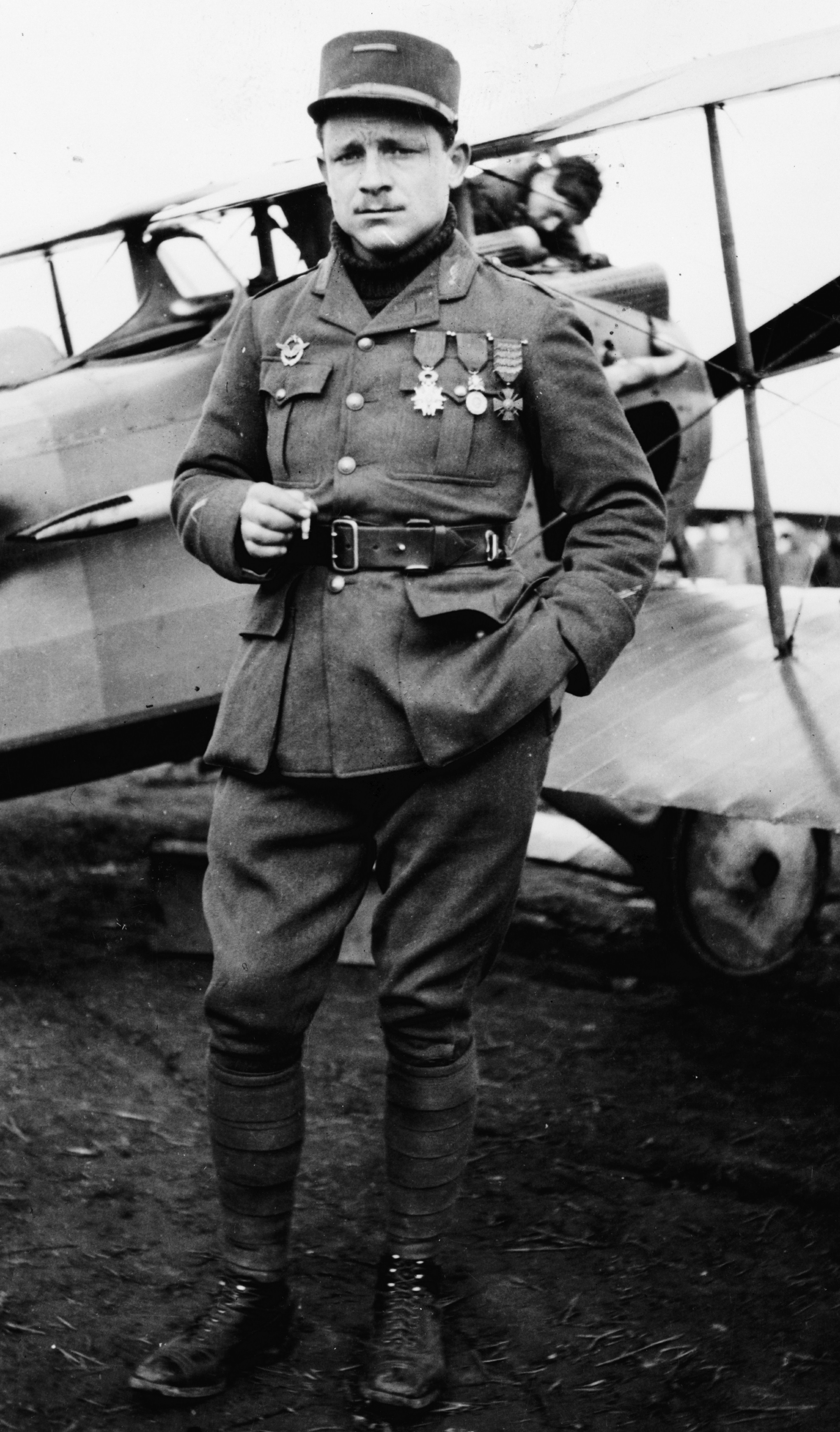
- Gervais Raoul Lufbery, 1918
- Born: March 14, 1885; Chamalières, France
- Died: May 19, 1918 (aged 33); Maron, France
- Burial place: Lafayette Escadrille Memorial, Marnes-la-Coquette, Île-de-France, France
- Military career
- Allegiance: France; United States
- Branch: Aéronautique Militaire (France); Air Service, United States Army
- Service years: 1907–1909; 1914–1918
- Rank: Major
- Units: Aéronautique Militaire: Escadrille VB.106; Escadrille N.124 (Lafayette Escadrille); Air Service, United States Army: 94th Aero Squadron
- Commands: 94th Aero Squadron
- Conflicts: World War I
- Awards: Légion d'honneur, Médaille militaire, Croix de guerre, British Military Medal

Gervais Raoul Victor Lufbery (March 14, 1885 – May 19, 1918) was a French and American fighter pilot and flying ace in World War I. Because he served in both the French Air Force, and later the United States Army Air Service in World War I, he is sometimes listed alternately as a French ace or as an American ace. All but one of his 17 confirmed combat victories came while flying in French units.

== Early life and service ==
Raoul Lufbery was born at Avenue de la Poudrière in Chamalières, Puy-de-Dôme, France to American Edward Lufbery and a French mother. Lufbery's paternal grandfather was Charles Samson Lufbery, who had emigrated to the United States from Great Britain in the mid-19th century and settled in New York. Lufbery's father, Edward moved to Chamalières in 1876, joining his elder brother, George and soon met a local Frenchwoman, Anne Joséphine Vessière, who would later become his wife. Raoul was the youngest of their three sons. Edward was an American chemist working for a Parisian chocolate company. When Lufbery was one, his mother died and his father returned to the United States, where he lived in New York, New Jersey, and then Wallingford, Connecticut, leaving him to be raised by his maternal grandmother, Madeline Vessière Greniere in France.

Lufbery worked in a chocolate factory in Blois and Clermont-Ferrand until 1904. While working in France, Lufbery sent money to his father, who had started a second family in the United States. He ran away from his grandparents' home at 19, and travelled to such places as Egypt, Algeria, Tunisia, the Balkans, and Turkey. In 1906, Lufbery, along with his middle brother, Charles took a trans-Atlantic liner to the US to search for his father, not knowing that his father had just left for business on an ocean liner heading to France. However, he managed to visit other family members in Connecticut. He then stayed in Walllingford with his relatives for two years, working at a silver-plating factory.

Lufbery served in the United States Army from 1907–1909 as a rifleman and saw service in the Philippines. He was first assigned from the recruit depot of Fort McDowell, Angel Island to Company F, 20th Infantry Regiment, at the newly established Fort Shafter, Territory of Hawaii on 13 December 1908. On 1 April 1909, he was stationed with Company M, at the Presidio of Monterey, California. In 1910, he was sent to Cuartel de España, Manila. After his time with the US Army, he saw India, Japan, and China.

In 1912, Lufbery traveled to French Indochina, where he took a job as a mechanic for French aviation pioneer Marc Pourpe, whom he met in Calcutta the same year. When war broke out in France, Pourpe joined the French Air Force (Aéronautique Militaire) as a pilot. Meanwhile, Lufbery joined the Foreign Legion and later transferred into the Aéronautique Militaire as a mechanic. Pourpe's death in a crash ignited Lufbery's desire for revenge and he applied for pilot's training.

== Early aerial service ==
Late in 1914, Lufbery was accepted into the pilot training program and was assigned to fly reconnaissance missions with Escadrille VB 106. He later applied for a transfer to fighter planes and was trained on the Nieuport. Although he became an ace, Lufbery was not a naturally gifted pilot. His success was due to perseverance and attention to mechanical detail. He was often harassed by fellow pilots for working with the mechanics on his plane. Lufbery also inspected and polished each bullet in his gun's drum to help avoid jams, a frequent problem of the Lewis gun.

== Lafayette Escadrille ==
In 1916, a group of American volunteers formed the Escadrille Américaine (shortly to be renamed N-124 Escadrille Lafayette) to aid France's war effort against the Germans. The squadron was renamed at the request of the American Secretary of War after heavy protest from Germany that an American squadron was a violation of the United States' neutrality. The squadron was largely made up of upper-class Americans with little flight experience. Lufbery, as an American citizen with aeronautics experience, was recruited and joined the unit on 24 May 1916 and was assigned a Nieuport fighter.

However, his first encounters with his unit members did not go smoothly. Lufbery spoke English with a thick French accent and had little in common with his comrades, most of whom were from wealthy families and were Ivy League educated. Once in combat, though, his dogged determination and success earned him the respect and admiration of his peers. One night while the squadron was resting in Paris, a fellow pilot bought a lion which had been born on a boat from Africa. After taking him around Paris, the pilots attempted to take "Whiskey", so named for the cub's affinity for drinking a saucer full of whiskey, aboard a passenger train after receiving orders to ship out to Luxeuil. Although assured that the lion was harmless, the conductor was inclined to believe otherwise after Whiskey roared and attempted to bite his finger. Two Escadrille pilots were then inclined to stay behind to crate up the animal and bring him the next day. Lufbery raised this lion, named Whiskey, for several years. Later, Whiskey got another lion playmate, named Soda since she got on so well with Whiskey, as the pilots felt the lion needed a female companion. Soda was much wilder than Whiskey and would spit and claw at anyone who came near, with the notable exception of Lufbery. Although both the animals were fond of Lufbery, Whiskey followed him around the aerodrome like a pet dog. Eventually the pair were taken to a Paris Zoo.

His first victory came on 30 July 1916 over Verdun. By 12 October 1916, he had downed five enemy planes, making him an ace, and earning him a promotion to adjutant. It was during this time that the "Lufbery circle" maneuver became named for him. Although most aviation scholars agree that Lufbery did not actually invent the maneuver, it was popularized among Allied flyers. In addition, according to Eddie Rickenbacker in his book, Fighting the Flying Circus, Lufbery is credited with having invented the precursor to the modern airport flight pattern. Prior to Lufbery's influence, planes would fly in and land in any direction on the field, based on their needs and wind direction, which caused confusion, near misses, and collisions. Lufbery, at the time commander of the 94th Squadron, directed that all approaching aircraft would circle the field at least twice before landing, watching for others taking off or landing. This process eventually became the "Down Wind, Base, and Final" standard airport pattern that pilots use every day in VFR flight.

== American service ==
He was commissioned in the United States Army Air Service in late 1917 with the rank of Major. He had claimed 16 air kills by this time, with another unconfirmed. Most of his victories were solo, though he had shared one each with fellow aces Victor Sayaret, Paul Malavialle, and Achille Rousseaux.

In the spring of 1918, Lufbery was chosen to become the commanding officer of the yet-unformed 94th Aero Squadron with the rank of major. Lufbery's principal job was to instruct the new pilots such as Eddie Rickenbacker in combat techniques. The United States Army Air Service was equipped with Nieuport 28 fighters, but due to supply problems, many lacked armament. The 94th's first combat patrol on 6 March 1918, saw Lufbery leading Rickenbacker and fellow flyer Doug Campbell in unarmed airplanes. Lufbery had unconfirmed claims in April 1918, on the 12th and the 27th, while leading 94 Squadron.

== Death ==
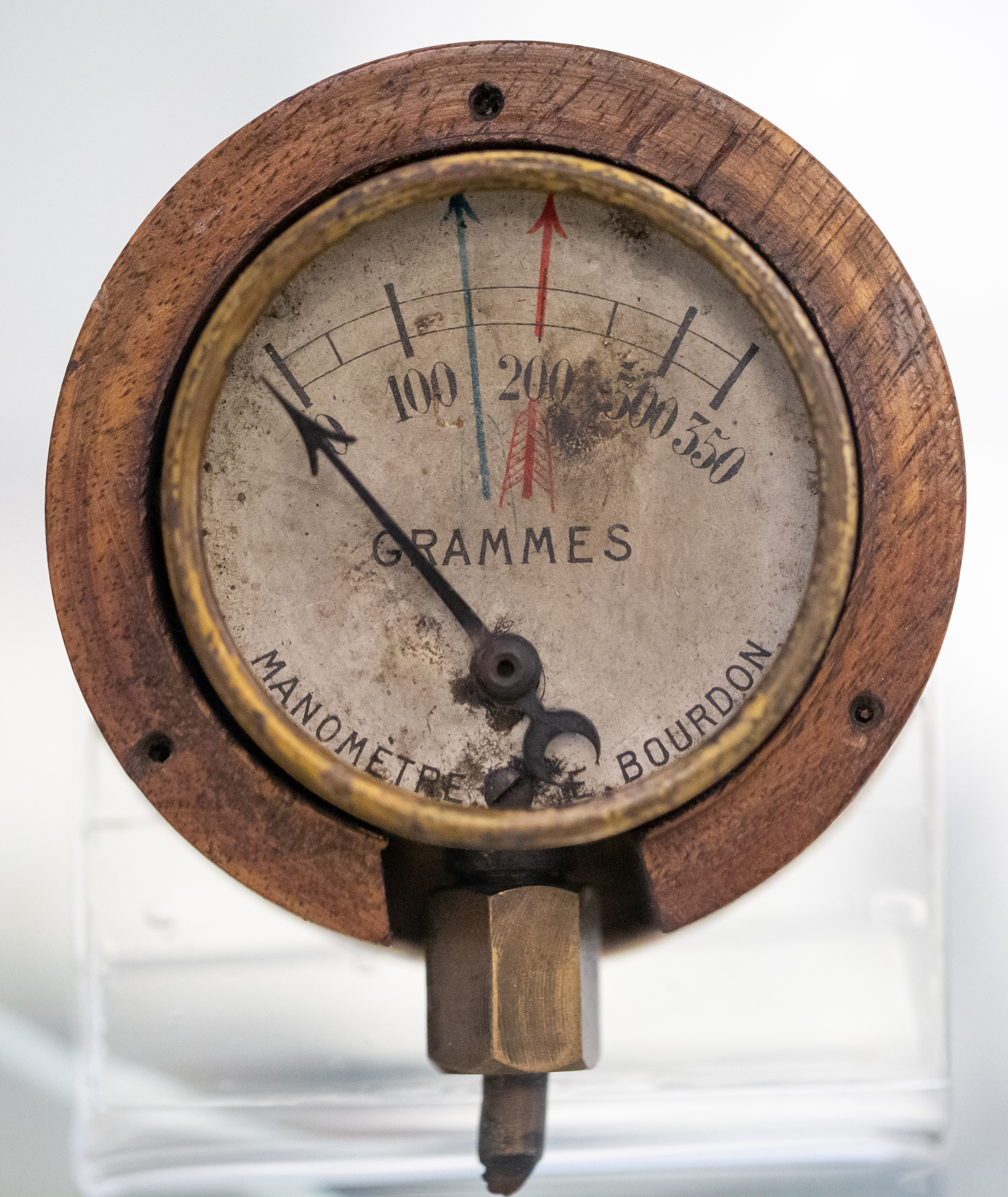
Fuel pressure gauge from an aircraft flown by Lufbery, on display at the Steven F. Udvar-Hazy Center.

On 19 May 1918, Lufbery took off in a Nieuport 28 in an attempt to intercept a German Albatros C.III near to the 94th's home airfield. As Lufbery closed in to attack, the German gunner's fire hit the Nieuport.

What happened next has been a matter of debate. At an altitude variously estimated between 200 and 600 feet, Lufbery was said to have jumped out of the plane, either to avoid a fiery death or as an attempt to land in the nearby Moselle River, rather than being thrown from the cockpit after it flipped over above the village of Maron. His falling body struck a metal garden picket fence, causing his death. However, on-site research by Royal D. Frey of the National Museum of the United States Air Force (then the Air Force Museum) established in 1962 that witnesses on the ground below the action saw the plane, not burning, flip over, and Lufbery was thrown out, having unfastened his seat belt to clear a jam in his machine gun during his final fight. Frey went on to explain the social dynamics that led to the "historical inflation."

Lufbery was buried with full military honors at the Aviators Cemetery at Sebastapol, France. His remains were later removed to a place of honor at the Lafayette Memorial du Parc de Garches in Paris. Although he received credit for only 17 victories in his career, his fellow pilots related many instances when he shot down German planes that he was not credited for. His actual number of victories has been unofficially estimated at anywhere between 25 and 60.

== Awards ==

Chevalier of the Legion of Honor	Médaille militaire	Croix de guerre 1914-1918 (France) with 4 bronze palms
1914–1918 Inter-Allied Victory medal	Military Medal (United Kingdom)	

== Legacy ==
A sculpture of Lufbery and an airplane form the Harmon International Trophy, an award given annually beginning in 1926 to honor achievements in aviation. In 1998, Lufbery was enshrined in the National Aviation Hall of Fame.

Although Lufbery only lived in Wallingford for a short period of time, it was his official home address, and a number of public facilities are named after him, including an avenue, a park, a VFW building, and a highway ramp. Lufbery's house and the Wallingford Historical Society building are marked with plaques placed for the 100th anniversary of his death as part of Wallingford's 350th Jubilee celebrations. The road linking Interstate 91 exit 13 to Route 5 in Wallingford is called the Major General Raoul Lufbery Memorial Highway.

== Pop culture references ==
- Charles Nordhoff and James Norman Hall, authors of the "Bounty Trilogy", also wrote Falcons of France (1929) an account of their service in the Lafayette Escadrille during World War I in which Lufbery appears as a much admired comrade.
- In what proved to be William Wellman's final film, Layfayette Escadrille (1958), Craig Hill appears as Lufbery, in what amounts to a walk-on role.
- Lufbery is one of the main characters in Jeffrey Shaara's book, To the Last Man.
- The character of Reed Cassidy in the 2006 film Flyboys (played by Martin Henderson) is roughly based on Lufbery.
- Lufbery features prominently in the Young Indiana Jones Chronicles episode "Attack of the Hawkmen".
- He and his lion cub, Whiskey, are depicted on card number 10 of the Scholastic book/online-game/treasure-hunt The 39 Clues, indicating he was a member of the Cahill family branch, Janus, in the series.
- Jean Shepherd's November 17, 1969 radio broadcast humorously credits Lufbery with the invention of the French 75 cocktail. (podbay.fmn — 27:00 into the recording.)
- In 2018, Lufbery was the subject of the short documentary Raul Lufbery: Fighter Ace, directed by Alexander Zane Irwin and produced by Daniel Bernardi with the collaboration of El Dorado Films and the Veteran Documentary Corps.

== See also ==
- List of World War I flying aces from the United States

== Bibliography ==
- Franks & Bailey- 'Over the Front' (Grub Street) 1992.
- Norman Franks.- Nieuport Aces of World War 1. (Osprey Publishing) 2000. ISBN 1-85532-961-1, ISBN 978-1-85532-961-4.
- Harry Dempsey. American aces of World War 1 Osprey Publishing, 2001. ISBN 1-84176-375-6, ISBN 978-1-84176-375-0.
- Lafayette Escadrille: America's Most Famous Squadron NFI.
