= 95th Reconnaissance Squadron =

95th Reconnaissance Squadron

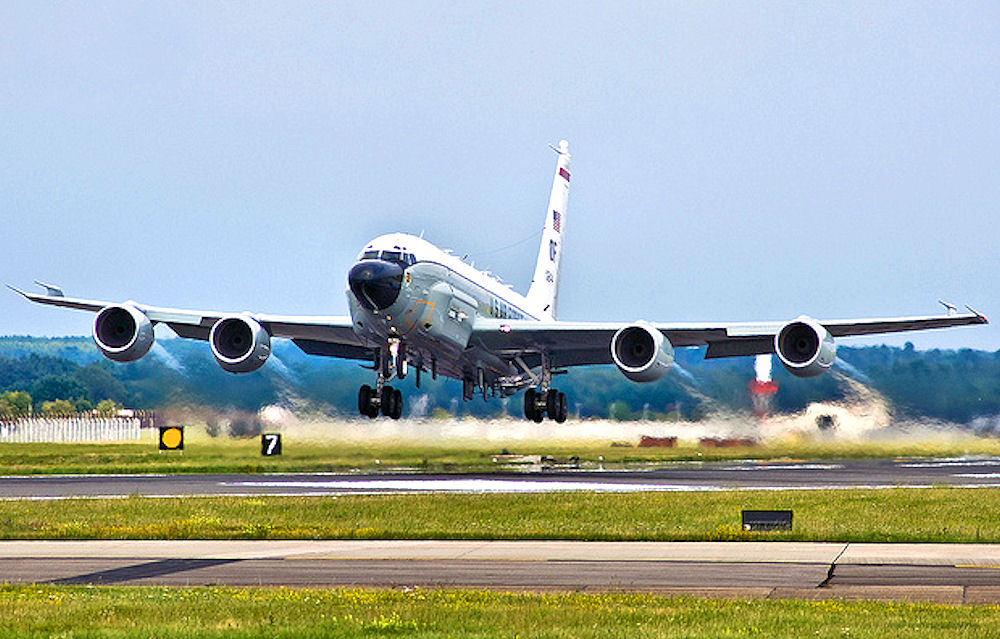
- 95th Reconnaissance Squadron RC-135V Rivet Joint ISR aircraft.
- Active: 1917–1919; 1919–1927; 1928–1945; 1947–1948; 1952–1958; 1982–1993; 1994–present
- Country: United States
- Branch: United States Air Force
- Type: Squadron
- Role: Reconnaissance
- Part of: Air Combat Command
- Garrison/HQ: RAF Mildenhall
- Nickname: Kickin' Ass
- Engagements: World War I; World War II – Antisubmarine; World War II – EAME Theater; Korean Service Medal; Kosovo Campaign

- Decorations: Distinguished Unit Citation (3x); Air Force Meritorious Unit Award (6x); Air Force Outstanding Unit Award (6x); French Croix de Guerre with Palm (World War II) (3x); Republic of Korea Presidential Unit Citation

Insignia
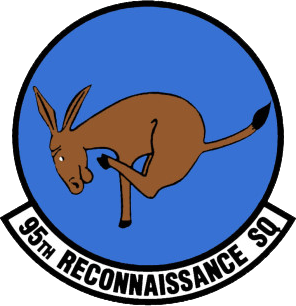
- 95th Reconnaissance Squadron emblem (Note: Approved 24 March 1924. Description: The kicking mule, brown on a light blue oval background. In the original version of the emblem, the mule's ears and tail projected outside the disc. The current emblem was reviewed by the United States Air Force Chief of Staff in 1991. Bailey. The emblem is based on the emblem approved for the 95th Aero Squadron by the American Expeditionary Forces on 19 November 1918. Maurer, Combat Squadrons, p. 318.)
- Post 1994 Tail Code: OF

The 95th Reconnaissance Squadron is a squadron of the United States Air Force. It is assigned to the 55th Operations Group, Air Combat Command, stationed at Offutt Air Force Base, Nebraska. The squadron is equipped with several variants of the Boeing C-135 aircraft equipped for reconnaissance missions.

The 95th is one of the oldest units in the United States Air Force, first being organized as the 95th Aero Squadron on 20 August 1917 at Kelly Field, Texas. The squadron deployed to France and fought on the Western Front during World War I as a pursuit squadron.

During World War II the unit served in the Mediterranean Theater of Operations (MTO) as part of Twelfth Air Force as a Martin B-26 Marauder light bomber squadron, participating in the North African and the Southern France Campaign. In the Cold War, the squadron fought in the Korean War with Douglas B-26 Invader medium bombers, then later as part of Strategic Air Command, flying TR-1A Dragonlady reconnaissance aircraft supporting NATO.

== Mission ==
Conducts RC-135 Rivet Joint flight operations in the European and Mediterranean theaters of operations as tasked by National Command Authorities and European Command. Provides all operational management, aircraft maintenance, administration, and intelligence support to produce politically sensitive real-time intelligence data vital to national foreign policy. Supports EC-135, OC-135 Open Skies, and Boeing E-4B missions when theater deployed.

Although it is a component of the 55th Operations Group, main flying operations are conducted from RAF Mildenhall, United Kingdom and Souda Bay, Crete.

== History ==
=== World War I ===
The 95th was originally activated as the 95th Aero Squadron (a fighter unit) on 20 August 1917 at Kelly Field in Texas. It deployed to various locations in France during World War I, initially at Issoudun Aerodrome. On 5 May 1918, it was assigned to the 1st Pursuit Group. Well-known pilots with the 95th Aero Squadron who perished in World War I included Lt. Quentin Roosevelt, the youngest son of President Theodore Roosevelt, and Irby Curry. Both of them died while the squadron was based in Saints Aerodrome, France. A number of aces also served with the unit, including Lansing Holden, Sumner Sewall, Harold Buckley, Edward Peck Curtis, James Knowles, and one of its commanding officers, Captain David M. Peterson.

After the war ended on 11 November 1918, the 95th Aero Squadron was demobilized on 18 March 1919. As the 95th Pursuit Squadron it conducted bombing missions on the Clinton River to prevent flooding in communities near the river caused by an ice jam. As the 95th Attack Squadron, it flew reconnaissance missions in March 1938 to support flood relief operations in southern California.

=== Interwar years ===
The 95th Aero Squadron underwent various activations and inactivations over the years and experienced numerous name changes.

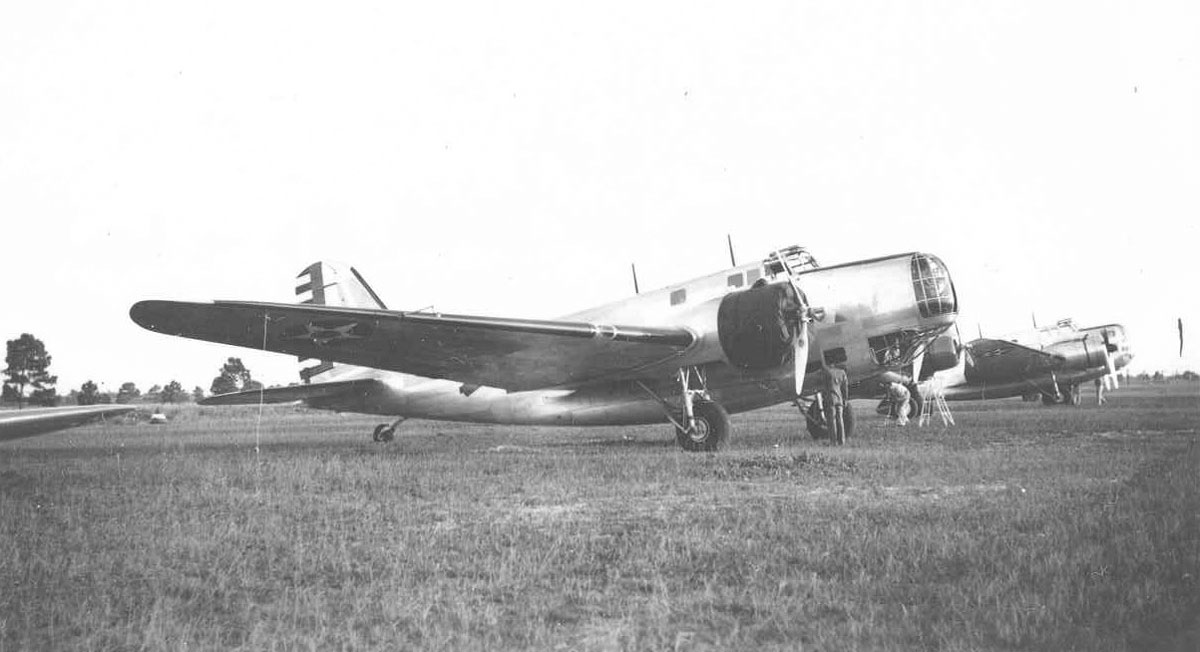
Douglas B-18s as flown by the squadron

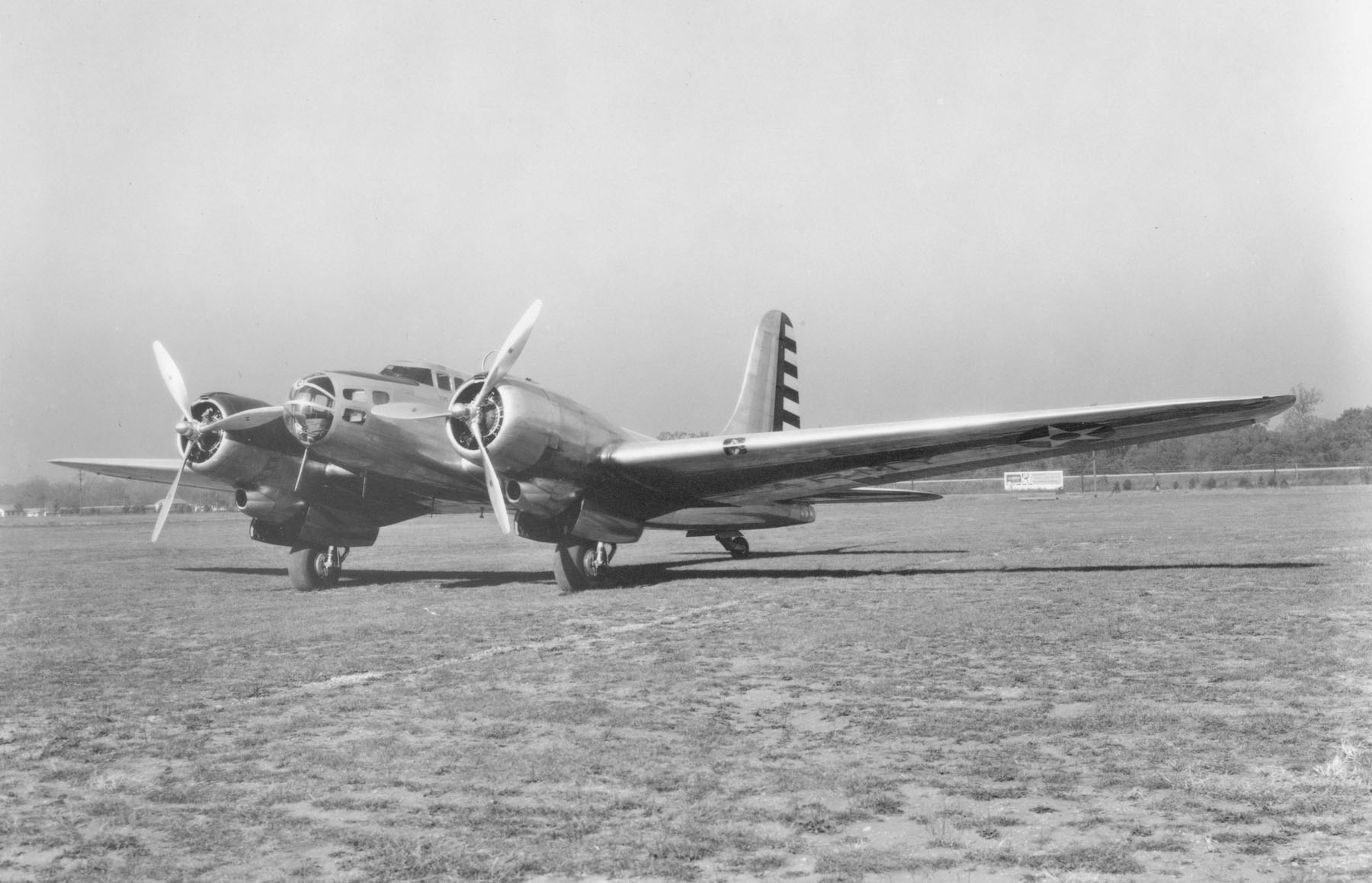
Douglas B-23 Dragon, which replaced the B-18

In 1939 the squadron was equipped with the new Douglas B-18 Bolo medium bomber and redesignated the 95th Bombardment Squadron. The B-18s were soon replaced by Douglas B-23 Dragons.

In June 1940 the squadron moved to McChord Field, Washington. The B-23 had a short life in front line service, and the 95th was re-equipped with the new North American B-25 Mitchell medium bomber in February 1941, when the 17th Bombardment Group became the first Air Corps unit to receive the new bomber. In June, the squadron moved to Pendleton Field, Oregon, In August, it received the updated B-25B, that had a much heavier defensive armament, dictated by the results of combat reports coming in from Europe.

=== World War II ===
==== Antisubmarine patrols ====
In the immediate aftermath of the Pearl Harbor Attack, the 95th flew anti-submarine warfare patrols in the Pacific Northwest from 22 December 1941 to c. March 1942. It moved to Lexington County Airport, South Carolina, on 9 February 1942 in order to meet the greater threat from German submarines operating off the East Coast.

==== Doolittle raid ====
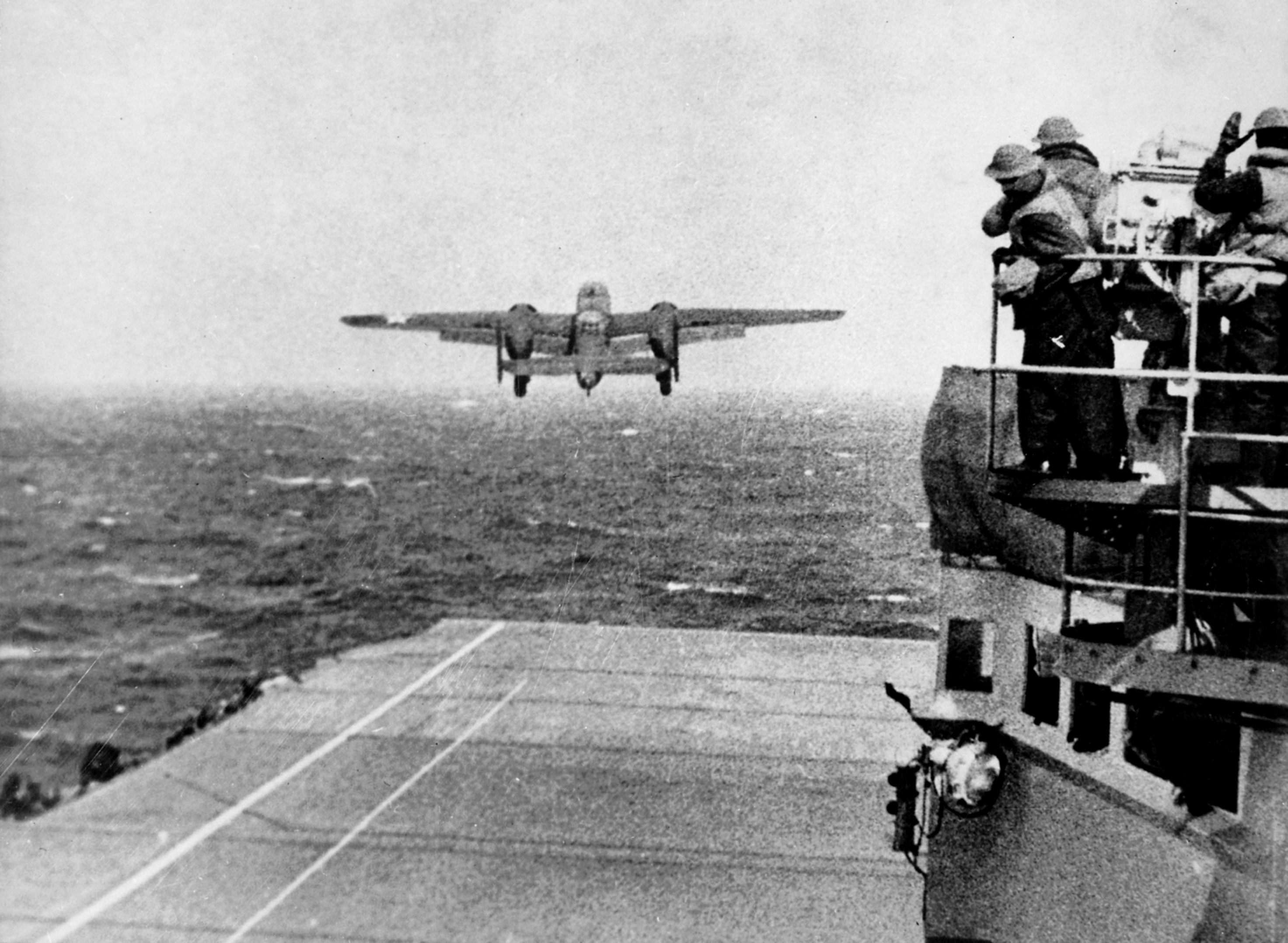
B-25 taking off for the Doolittle Raid

Planning for a retaliatory bombing raid on Japan began in December 1941, and twenty-four B-25Bs were diverted from the 17th Bombardment Group, which was the only B-25 unit in the Air Corps, and volunteers from its four squadrons, including the 95th, were recruited, the crews being told only that this was a secret and dangerous mission. The volunteers trained at Eglin Field, Florida. Upon completion of training, they left Eglin for McClellan Field, California for final modifications to the B-25s before moving to Naval Air Station Alameda, where the bombers were loaded on the USS Hornet (CV-8) for the raid.

==== Combat in the Mediterranean ====
The remainder of the squadron remained in Columbia, flying antisubmarine patrols until 23 June when it moved to Barksdale Field, Louisiana. There, the squadron re-equipped with the Martin B-26 Marauder, and began transition training under Third Air Force.

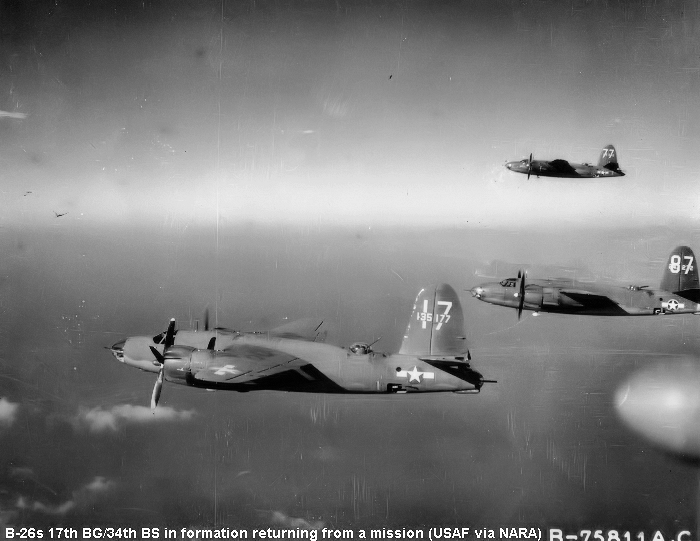
17th Group Martin B-26 Marauders returning from a mission, about 1943 (Note: Martin B-26C-25-MO Marauder, serial 41-35177 is identifiable, flying on one engine over the Mediterranean. This plane was salvaged on 18 August 1945 due to damage from enemy action. Baugher, Joe (10 August 2023). "1941 USAF Serial Numbers". Joe Baugher.)

In November 1942, the squadron deployed to North Africa, arriving at Telergma Airport, Algeria in December 1942 following Operation Torch's initial landings, becoming part of XII Bomber Command. The squadron flew interdiction and close air support, bombing bridges, rail lines, marshalling yards, harbors, shipping, gun emplacements, troop concentrations and other enemy targets in Algeria and later Tunisia supporting American and later Allied ground forces as they moved east and participated in the Tunisian Campaign.

During 1943, the 34th participated in Operation Corkscrew, the reduction of Pantelleria. It supported Operation Husky, the Allied invasion of Sicily and Operation Avalanche, the invasion of Italy. During the drive toward Rome, the squadron was awarded a Distinguished Unit Citation for its attacks on airfields near Rome on 13 January 1944. It was also awarded the French Croix de Guerre with Palm for its operations in Italy between April and June.

The unit provided tactical air support in the liberation of Sardinia and Corsica. From airfields in Corsica, the 95th supported Allied ground forces during Operation Dragoon, the invasion of southern France in August 1944. It moved to Southern France and bombed enemy targets during the Allied drive northward. It earned a second Distinguished Unit Citation for bombing attacks on enemy defenses near Schweinfurt, Germany just before the end of the war on 10 April 1945.

The squadron remained in Europe after V-E Day. It became part of the occupation forces, and participated in the disarmament of Germany. It moved to the American Occupation Zone in Austria. The squadron returned to France to stage for its return to the United States, where it was inactivated in late November 1945.

=== Reconnaissance operations ===
After being inactivated on 25 June 1958, it was redesignated as the 95th Reconnaissance Squadron on 20 January 1982 and reactivated at RAF Alconbury in the United Kingdom on 1 October 1982. It flew Lockheed U-2 and TR-1 aircraft in support of NATO and United States Air Forces Europe missions. After the end of the Cold War, the 95th was no longer needed and the unit was inactivated on 15 September 1993. This hiatus did not last long as the unit was reactivated on 1 July 1994 at RAF Mildenhall, this time flying the RC-135 Rivet Joint and OC-135 Open Skies aircraft.

== Lineage ==
- Organized as the 95th Aero Squadron (Pursuit) on 20 August 1917

Redesignated as: 95th Aero Squadron (Pursuit), on 5 March 1918
Demobilized on 18 March 1919

- Reconstituted and organized on 12 August 1919

Redesignated 95th Squadron (Pursuit) on 14 March 1921
Redesignated 95th Pursuit Squadron on 30 September 1922
Redesignated 95th Pursuit Squadron, Air Service on 25 January 1923
Redesignated 95th Pursuit Squadron, Air Corps on 8 August 1926
Inactivated on 31 July 1927

- Redesignated 95th Pursuit Squadron and activated, on 1 June 1928

Redesignated 95th Attack Squadron on 1 March 1935
Redesignated 95th Bombardment Squadron (Medium) on 17 October 1939
Redesignated 95th Bombardment Squadron, Medium on 9 October 1944
Inactivated on 26 November 1945

- Redesignated 95th Bombardment Squadron, Light on 29 April 1947

Activated on 19 May 1947
Inactivated on 10 September 1948

- Redesignated 95th Bombardment Squadron, Light, Night Intruder on 8 May 1952

Activated on 10 May 1952
Redesignated 95th Bombardment Squadron, Tactical on 1 October 1955
Inactivated on 25 June 1958

- Redesignated 95th Reconnaissance Squadron on 20 January 1982

Activated on 1 October 1982
Inactivated on 15 September 1993

- Activated on 1 July 1994

=== Assignments ===
- Post Headquarters, Kelly Field, 20 August 1917
- Aviation Concentration Center, 30 September 1917
- Headquarters Air Service, AEF, 11–16 November 1917
- Third Aviation Instruction Center, 16 November 1917
- 1st Pursuit Organization Center, 16 February 1918
- 1st Pursuit Group, 5 May 1918
- 1st Air Depot, 11 December 1918 (Note: Per Gorrell. Maurer and Bailey both indicate that the assignment to the 1st Pursuit Group lasted until 24 December 1919.)
- Advanced Section Services of Supply, 6 February 1919
- Eastern Department, 1–18 March 1919
- 1st Pursuit Group, 12 August 1919
- Air Corps Training Center, c. 7 June-31 July 1927
- Unknown, 1 June 1928 – 30 May 1929 (Note: Maurer says the squadron was attached to the 7th Bombardment Group. Bailey describes this attachment as "possible", but neither Maurer nor Bailey give a unit of assignment. Clay indicates the squadron was again assigned to the 1st Pursuit Group. Maurer, Combat Squadrons, p. 317; Bailey; Clay, p. 1436.)
- 17th Pursuit Group (later 17th Attack; 17th Bombardment Group), 31 May 1929 – 26 November 1945 (attached to 7th Bombardment Group until 29 October 1931)
- 17th Bombardment Group, 19 May 1947 – 10 September 1948
- 17th Bombardment Group, 10 May 1952 – 25 June 1958 (attached to 17th Bombardment Wing after 8 June 1957)
- 17th Reconnaissance Wing, 1 October 1982
- 9th Strategic Reconnaissance Wing (later 9th Reconnaissance) Wing), 30 June 1991 – 15 September 1993
- 55th Operations Group, 1 July 1994 – present

=== Stations ===
- Kelly Field, Texas, 20 August 1917
- Hazelhurst Field, New York, 5–27 October 1917
- Liverpool, England, 10 November 1917
- British Rest Camp #2, Le Havre, France, 13 November 1917
- Issoudun Aerodrome, France, 16 November 1917
- Villeneuve-les-Vertus Aerodrome, France, 16 February 1918
- Epiez Aerodrome, France, 1 April 1918
- Gengault Aerodrome, Toul, France, 4 May 1918
- Touquin Aerodrome, France, 28 June 1918
- Saints Aerodrome, France, 9 July 1918
- Rembercourt Aerodrome, France, 2 September 1918

Flight operated from Verdun Aerodrome, France, 7–11 November 1918

- Colombey-les-Belles Airdrome, France, 11 December 1918
- Brest, France, France, 6–19 February 1919
- Camp Mills, New York, 1 March 1919
- Mitchell Field, New York, 4–18 March 1919
- Selfridge Field, Michigan, 12 August 1919
- Kelly Field, Texas, 31 August 1919
- Ellington Field, Texas, 1 July 1921
- Selfridge Field, Michigan, 1 July 1922
- March Field, California, 7 June-31 July 1927
- Rockwell Field, California, 1 June 1928
- March Field, California, 29 October 1931
- Rockwell Field, California, 3 May 1932
- March Field, California, 14 May 1932
- Rockwell Field, California, 1 July 1932
- March Field, California, 9 August 1932 (Note: Both Maurer and Clay indicate that the squadron remained at March Field after moving there in October 1931. Maurer, Combat Squadrons, p. 317; Clay, p. 1436.)
- Rentschler Field, Connecticut, 2 May 1938
- March Field, California, 20 May 1938 (operated from Kern County Airport, California, 14–26 January 1940
- McChord Field, Washington, 26 June 1940
- Pendleton Field, Oregon, 29 June 1941
- Lexington County Airport, South Carolina, 15 February 1942
- Barksdale Field, Louisiana, 24 June-18 Nov 1942
- Telergma Airfield, Algeria, c. 24 December 1942
- Sedrata Airfield, Algeria, 14 May 1943
- Djedeida Airfield, Tunisia, 25 June 1943
- Villacidro Airfield, Sardinia, France, c. 5 December 1943
- Poretta Airfield, Corsica, Italy, c. 19 September 1944
- Dijon Airfield (Y-9), France, c. 21 November 1944
- Linz Airport, Austria, c. 14 June 1945
- Ebensee, Austria (Ground echelon), 5 July 1945
- Clastres Airfield, France, c. 3 October-c. 17 November 1945
- Camp Myles Standish, Massachusetts, 25–26 November 1945
- Langley Field, Virginia, 19 May 1947 – 10 September 1948
- Pusan East (K-9) Air Base, South Korea, 10 May 1952 (operated from Pusan West Air Base (K-1), South Korea, 1 October-20 December 1952)
- Miho Air Base, Japan, c. 9 October 1954 – c. 19 March 1955
- Hurlburt Field, Florida, 1 April 1955 – 25 June 1958
- RAF Alconbury, England, 1 October 1982 – 15 September 1993
- RAF Mildenhall, England, 1 July 1994 – present

=== Aircraft ===
- Nieuport 28, 1917–1918
- SPAD S.XIII, 1918, 1919
- Royal Aircraft Factory S.E.5, 1919–1922
- Thomas-Morse MB-3, 1922–1925
- Fokker D.VII, 1919–1925
- Dayton-Wright DH-4, 1919–1925
- Curtiss PW–8 Hawk, 1924–1926
- Curtiss P-1 Hawk, 1925–1927
- Boeing PW-9, 1928–1929
- Boeing P-12, 1929–1934, 1935–1936
- Boeing P-26 Peashooter, 1934–1935
- Northrop A-17, 1936–1939
- Douglas B-18 Bolo, 1939–1940
- Douglas B-23 Dragon, 1940–1941
- North American B-25 Mitchell, 1941–1942
- Martin B-26 Marauder, 1942–1945
- Douglas B-26 Invader, 1952–1956
- Douglas B-66 Destroyer, 1956–1958
- Lockheed U-2, 1991–1993
- Lockheed TR-1, 1991–1993
- Boeing RC-135U Combat Sent, 1994–present
- Boeing RC-135V Rivet Joint, 1994–present
- Boeing RC-135W Rivet Joint, 1994–present
- Boeing OC-135B Open Skies, 1994–present

== See also ==
- List of American Aero Squadrons
