= 95th Aero Squadron =

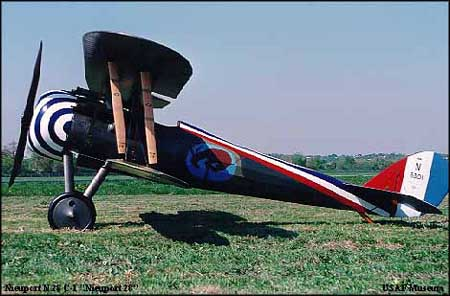
- A replica Nieuport 28 painted in the motif of the 95th Aero Squadron at the National Museum of the United States Air Force
- Active: 20 August 1917 – 18 March 1919
- Branch: Air Service, United States Army
- Type: Squadron
- Role: Pursuit
- Part of: American Expeditionary Forces (AEF)
- Fuselage Code: "Kicking Mule"
- Engagements: World War I

Commanders
- Notable commanders: Capt. James E. Miller; Capt. Seth Low; Maj. Davenport Johnson; Maj. David M. Peterson; Capt. John Mitchell

Insignia
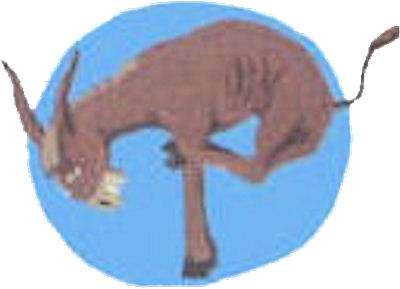
- 95th Aero Squadron Emblem

Aircraft flown
- Fighter: Nieuport 28, 1918; Spad XIII, 1918

Service record
- Operations: 1st Pursuit Group; Western Front, France: 4 May-11 November 1918: Sorties: 1,368; Enemy combats: 146; Killed: 5; Wounded: 4; Missing: 12 (8 POW)
- Victories: Enemy Aircraft shot down: 35; Enemy Balloons shot down: 12; Total Enemy Aircraft Destroyed: 47; Air Aces: 6: Lt. Harold R. Buckley, 5 (1 balloon, 4 shared); Lt. Edward P. Curtis, 6 (5 shared); Lt. Lancing C. Holden, 7 (5 balloons, 1 shared); Lt. James Knowles, Jr. 5 (1 shared); Maj. David M. Peterson, 5 (1 probable); Capt. Sumner Sewell, 7 (2 balloons, 4 shared)

The 95th Aero Squadron was an Air Service, United States Army unit that fought on the Western Front during World War I. It was the first American pursuit (fighter) squadron to fly in combat on the Western Front, beginning on 8 March 1918.

The squadron was assigned as a Day Pursuit (Fighter) Squadron as part of the 1st Pursuit Group, First United States Army. Its mission was to engage and clear enemy aircraft from the skies and provide escort to reconnaissance and bombardment squadrons over enemy territory. It also attacked enemy observation balloons, and perform close air support and tactical bombing attacks of enemy forces along the front lines.

In combat, squadron members shot down 35 enemy aircraft and 12 observation balloons and had 6 Air Aces. Lieutenant Quentin Roosevelt, the youngest son of President Theodore Roosevelt was assigned to the 95th. He lost his life in combat on 14 July 1918.

After the 1918 Armistice with Germany, the squadron returned to the United States in March 1919 and was demobilized. The current United States Air Force unit which holds its lineage and history is the 95th Reconnaissance Squadron, assigned to the 55th Operations Group, RAF Mildenhall, England.

== History ==
=== Origins ===
The 95th Aero Squadron was formed at Kelly Field, Texas on 20 August 1917. Upon its formation, the men of the squadron were instructed in close-order drill and in military traditions. On 30 September, the squadron left Kelly Field for the Aviation Concentration Center, Hazelhurst Field No. 2, on Long Island, New York. From there it boarded the SS Adriatic on 27 October bound for overseas duty in Europe.

After an uneventful ocean crossing, the squadron arrived in Liverpool, England on 10 November. It then took a train to Southampton, on the southern English coast where it boarded the SS Huntscraft for a crossing over the English Channel to Le Havre, France. It arrived at the British Rest Camp No. 2 on 13 November.

=== Training in France ===
On 16 November, the squadron arrived at the 3d Air Instructional Center, Issoudun Aerodrome. Upon arrival, there was nothing but a field of mud. The men of the 95th were tasked in erecting tents, hangars and helping to build the base for future squadrons to come. According to the squadron historian, the winter spent at Issoudun will "never be forgotten. It was work from morning to night under the most adverse conditions." The pilots assigned to Issoudun began their flight training as aviation cadets.

=== Combat on the Western Front ===
On 16 February, the 95th Squadron was transferred to Villeneuve-les-Vertus Aerodrome where it arrived at the "Zone of the Advance" (Western Front) on 18 February. This was another new camp with a tremendous amount of mud. The squadron did not have any planes to fly or maintain so it was immediately put to work on construction tasks. Finally, on 5 March the first airplane arrived, a Nieuport 28 and the 95th was designated as a Pursuit (Fighter) squadron. Over the next few days, additional Nieuport 28s were received from Orly Field, near Paris. However the aircraft were received without any machine guns.

However, without machine-guns, the 95th flew familiarization flights with French Air Service squadrons. However, on 8 March the 95th was reminded there was a war, when its commanding officer, Captain Miller, was shot down on his first flight behind the German lines. However, despite not having machine guns on their planes, proceeded to fly reconnaissance patrols daily, however after Captain Miller was shot down, the pilots of the 95th were restricted to flying over friendly territory.

==== Toul Sector ====
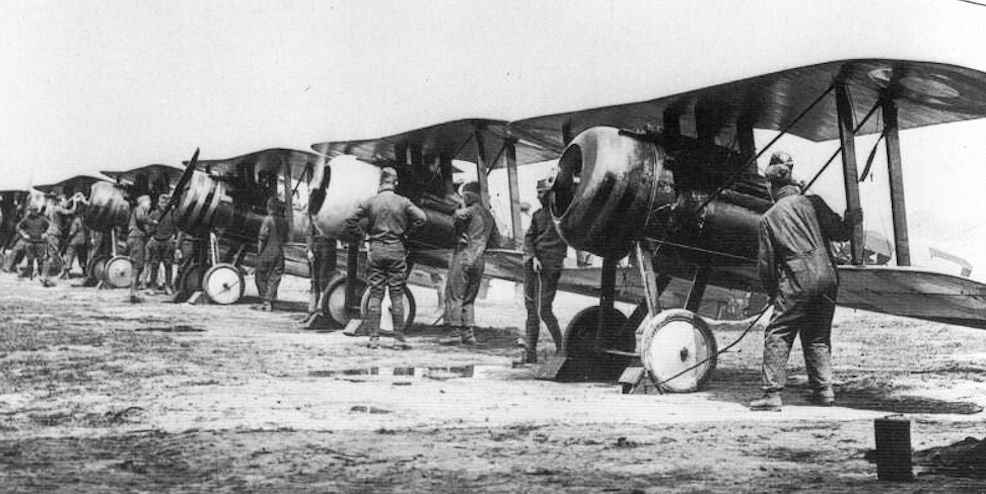
95th Squadron Nieuport 28s at Croix de Metz Aerodrome, June 1918

On 31 March, the 95th moved to Epiez Aerodrome. Again, the squadron found itself at a new field that was primarily mud, and for the next month, the men of the squadron were put to work doing construction and erecting tents and hangars. On 8 April, seven of the squadron's planes were transferred to the 94th Aero Squadron, which was being transferred to Croix de Metz Aerodrome, near Toul. By the end of the month, the 95th was also being prepared to move to Toul, and on 4 May it also moved. On 5 May, the 95th was organized, along with the 94th Aero Squadron into the 1st Pursuit Group.

At Toul, active combat patrols and alerts immediately commenced, over the sector from Saint-Mihiel to Pont a Mousson. On 11 May, the first combat patrol was flown without French escorts, but no enemy contact was made. 15 May was the first really busy day for the 95th, as it flew 23 sorties to escort pilots of the 1st Aero Squadron on a photographic and observation mission. An additional 22 sorties were flown with the 1st on the 16th. On the 17th, the squadron lost its second pilot when Lt. Blodgett, returning from an escort patrol with the 1st had an engine failure and crashed into the ground a few miles from the field. Also on 17 May, the squadron claimed its first official air victory when Captain Peterson, a former Lafayette Escadrille flyer, attacked two German biplanes in the region of Saint-Mihiel and attacked them both. He saw the first plane go down, but was attacked by the second enemy plane. Through the month nearly all sorties were made giving protection to I Corps Observation Group reconnaissance planes, each day flying about 25 – 35 sorties. The enemy in the sector, however, did normally not engage the squadron's aircraft, keeping a respectful distance. On 21 May, two air combats were reported, when Lieutenants Taylor and Hall fired on an enemy aircraft, killing the observer and forcing the aircraft back to its lines. Earlier in the day, Lt Wooley was attacked by an enemy aircraft in the region of Fimery, however, he escaped without injury. From this point, air combats became a daily occurrence. On 30 May, the squadron lost its 3d pilot when Lieutenant Casgrais was shot down over enemy territory, however, he was later reported to be a prisoner.

In June, the squadron received its first replacement pilots. One of them, 1st Lieutenant Quentin Roosevelt joined the squadron on the 17th. He was the youngest son of former president Theodore Roosevelt. Also with Roosevelt, the squadron welcomed Lieutenants Thomson, Montage and Vann.

==== Marne Sector ====
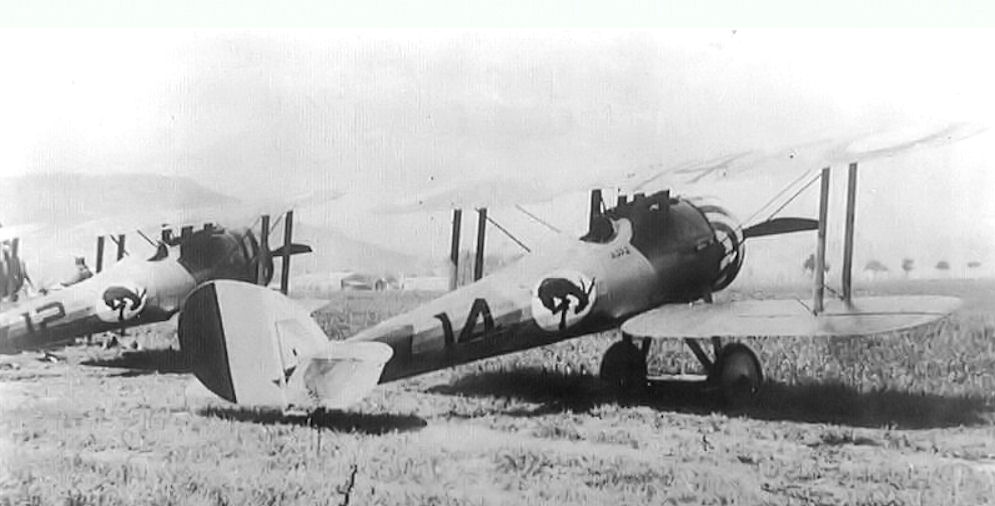
"Kicking Mule" on the fuselage of squadron Nieuport 28s

On 29 June the 1st Pursuit Group moved to the Chateau Thierry sector and to Touquin Aerodrome. There, the 95th began receiving SPAD XIIIs, replacing the unpopular Nieuport 28s. On 5 July, air combat began again after a few weeks of respite, with large numbers of sorties flown, and losses of men and aircraft resulted. The 95th was flying against the finest pilots of the enemy, and often was outnumbered in the air. On 9 July, the squadron moved again, this time to Saints Aerodrome, which was nearer the front lines. However, unlike the Toul Sector, this sector was not as active with German aircraft and only a few enemy aircraft were encountered.

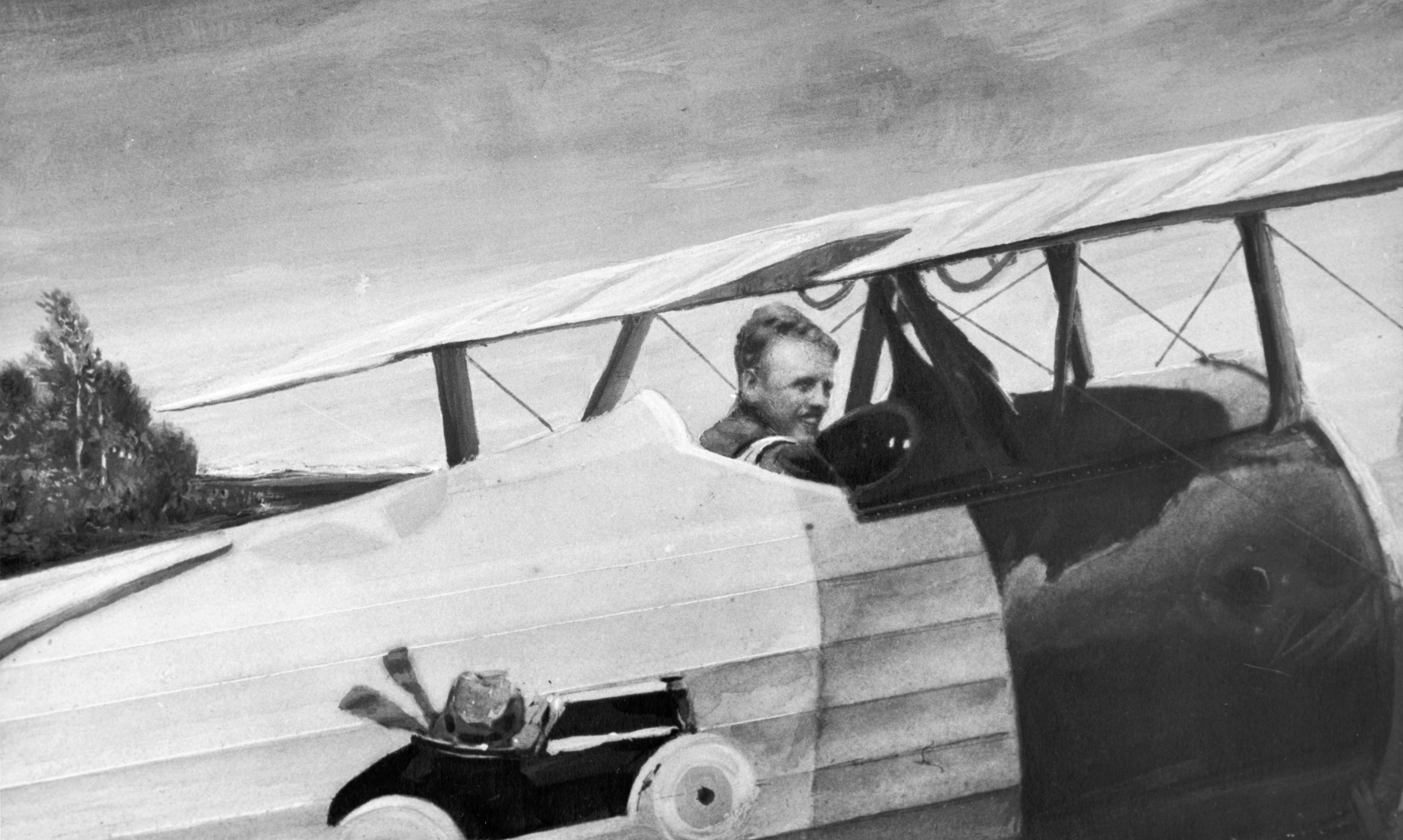
1st Lieutenant Quentin Roosevelt in a Nieuport 27 trainer

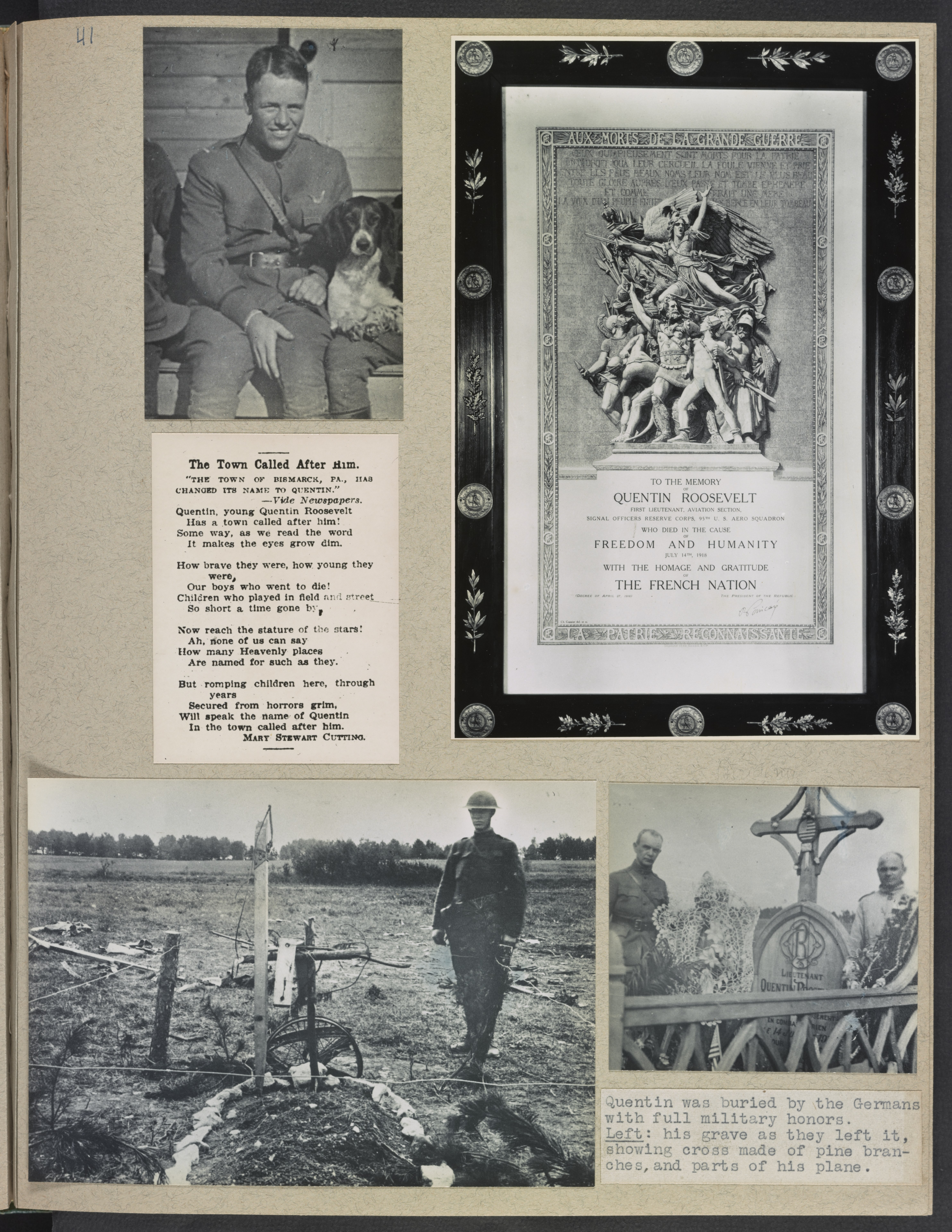
Page from album showing photographs of Quentin Roosevelt with his dog and a poem about his death; a French plaque in memory of him and his grave in France

Lieutenant Roosevelt shot down his first plane on 10 July, and he reported that after he crossed the line east of Château-Thierry, he saw a patrol of three enemy aircraft flying to the northwest. After flying west of Beuvardes, he shot at the enemy from above. After about 100 shots, one of the planes went into a spin and began to fall through the clouds. The plane was later confirmed to have crashed. However, on 14 July, Lt. Roosevelt was missing after another air combat. Several days later, a German plane flew over the lines and dropped a note saying that he was killed in action and was buried with full military honors at Chambray.

On the 15th, the full Allied offensive in the Château-Thierry Sector began, with operations ongoing from dawn until nightfall. The 27th encountered German formations as large as 30 aircraft. On the 16th the Germans crossed the Marne River at Dormans, however, the American infantry outflanked the Germans and were able to hold the line. During the offensive, the 95th continued escort flights of photo-reconnaissance planes so headquarters would be able to know the locations and strength of the enemy forces and each day air combat with enemy planes were encountered.

==== St. Mihiel Offensive ====
By 1 September, the front had moved considerably and preparations were being made to move up closer to the line. A move to Rembercourt Aerodrome was made on 2 September and operations began the next day. In order to keep the squadron operations secret from the Germans, it was necessary to keep aircraft in the air in the vicinity of Rembercourt to guard against their photographic planes.

The American Saint-Mihiel Offensive began on 12 September after an intense artillery barrage, and the 95th was ordered to conduct close air support for the infantry and machine-gun enemy infantry on the ground; protect observation aircraft and take the offensive to enemy pursuit planes spotted in the sector. In addition, all enemy observation balloons were to be attacked.

However, on account of weather conditions, flights were limited to about 200 meters in altitude, with patrols primarily supporting the infantry advance and to attack enemy convoys and troop concentrations in its rear areas. However, after a few days, the weather improved and the squadron was able to operate from as high as 5,500 meters.

==== Meuse-Argonne Offensive ====
On the 17th the squadron's sector was changed and it began patrolling between the Argonne and Verdun, and its mission was changed from air interdiction to ground support of advancing Army forces, normally flying below 800 meters. The first task was to shoot down German observation balloons.

On the night of 25 September, the heaviest American artillery barrage of the war was laid down on the enemy front with the beginning of the Meuse-Argonne Offensive. Operations orders received stated that all available aircraft would leave the ground before dawn to attack and destroy all enemy observation balloons. After that aircraft would attack enemy troops on the ground and engage any enemy aircraft to prevent them attacking friendly infantry forces.

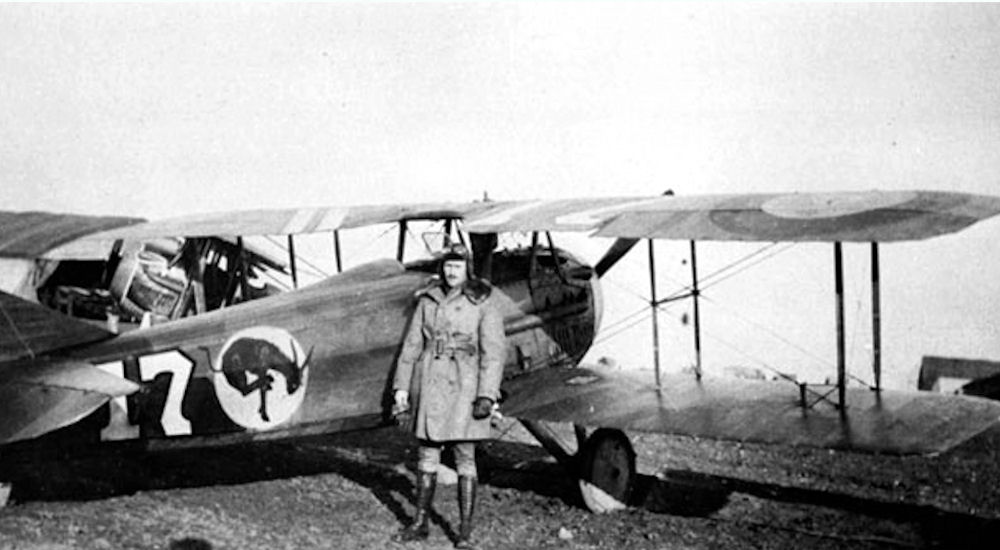
95th Aero Squadron – SPAD XIII

Operations were mainly at altitudes of less than 600 meters primarily to attack any enemy aircraft flying to attack American ground forces. During the closing days of the war, reports indicated that enemy activity had dwindled to a great extent. Only a few biplanes and an occasional enemy formation of aircraft were seen. The last flight that involved combat with enemy aircraft took place on 8 November when Lieutenant Rhenstrom took off on a voluntary patrol to strafe enemy infantry on a road from Remeinville to Montmedy. As he came out of the clouds he saw three enemy Fokkers slightly below him and going in the same direction. He dove on the rear plane of the formation and saw the plane start to spin and fall immediately after his first burst. He then turned to the second enemy aircraft and saw the tracer bullets enter its fuselage, seeing it crash. The third enemy plane turned and avoided combat. He then continued, looking for the infantry, but they were nowhere to be found. On his way back to Rembercourt Rhenstrom saw an enemy balloon in the region of Chauvency-le-Château which he attacked, however without results.

On 9 November at the advanced field near Verdun, an enemy Fokker landed. The pilot said he was lost and that the war would soon be over, and didn't care where he landed. The pilot was immediately made a prisoner. His plane was flown to Rembercourt the next day as a war trophy.

The final wartime flight of the 95th Aero Squadron was at 14:00 on 10 November as a single plane took off. No enemy contact was made and it landed uneventfully. Unfavorable weather caused the squadron to be grounded on the morning of 11 November and all combat operations ceased at 11:00.

=== Demobilization ===
Proficiency flights were conducted after the Armistice with Germany, however, no flights were permitted to be flown over German-controlled territory. The squadron remained at Rembercourt for about a month. On 11 December 1918 orders were received from First Army for the squadron to report to the 1st Air Depot, Colombey-les-Belles Airdrome to turn in all of its supplies and equipment and was relieved from duty with the AEF. The squadron's SPAD aircraft were delivered to the Air Service American Air Service Acceptance Park No. 1 at Orly Aerodrome to be returned to the French. There practically all of the pilots and observers were detached from the squadron. During the organization's stay at Colombey, the men attended to the usual camp duties.

Personnel at Colombey were subsequently assigned to the commanding general, services of supply, and ordered to report to one of several staging camps in France. There, personnel awaited scheduling to report to one of the Base Ports in France for transport to the United States and subsequent demobilization. On 6 February 1919, the 95th was moved to Base Station #5 near the port of Brest prior to its return to the United States. Upon arrival the men were caught up on any back pay owed to them, de-loused, a formal military records review was performed and a passenger list was created prior to the men boarding a ship.

On 19 February 1919, the 95th Aero Squadron boarded a troop ship and sailed for New York Harbor, arriving on the 28th. It proceeded to Camp Mills, Long Island, on 1 March where the personnel of the squadron were demobilized and returned to civilian life.

=== Lineage ===
- Organized as: 95th Aero Squadron, on 20 August 1917

Re-designated as: 95th Aero Squadron (Pursuit), on 5 March 1918
Demobilized on 18 March 1919

=== Assignments ===
- Post Headquarters, Kelly Field, 20 August 1917
- Aviation Concentration Center, 30 September 1917
- Headquarters Air Service, AEF, 11–16 November 1917
- 3d Instructional Center, 16 November 1917
- 1st Pursuit Organization Center, 16 February 1918
- 1st Pursuit Group, 5 May 1918
- 1st Air Depot, 11 December 1918
- Commanding General, Services of Supply, 6 February 1919
- Eastern Department, 1–18 March 1919

=== Stations ===
- Kelly Field, Texas, 20 August 1917
- Aviation Concentration Center, Garden City, New York, 5–27 October 1917
- Port of Entry, Hoboken, New Jersey

Overseas transport, RMS Adriatic, 27 October-10 November 1917

- Liverpool, England, 10 November 1917
- British Rest Camp #2, Le Havre, France, 13 November 1917
- Issoudun Aerodrome, France, 16 November 1917
- Villeneuve-les-Vertus Aerodrome, France, 16 February 1918
- Epiez Aerodrome, France, 1 April 1918
- Croix de Metz Aerodrome, Toul, France, 4 May 1918
- Touquin Aerodrome, France, 28 June 1918
- Saints Aerodrome, France, 9 July 1918
- Rembercourt Aerodrome, France, 2 September 1918

Flight operated from Verdun Aerodrome, France, 7–11 November 1918

- Colombey-les-Belles Airdrome, France, 11 December 1918
- Brest, France, 6–19 February 1919
- Camp Mills, New York, 1 March 1919
- Mitchell Field, New York, 4–18 March 1919.

=== Combat sectors and campaigns ===
Streamer	Sector/Campaign	Dates	Notes
	Toul Sector	10 May-27 June 1918; 3–11 September 1918	
	Aisne-Marne Sector	1–14 July 1918; 18 July – 6 August 1918	
	Champagne-Marne Defensive Campaign	15–18 July 1918	
	Aisne-Marne Offensive Campaign	18 July – 6 August 1918	
	Vesle Sector	7–17 August 1918	
	St. Mihiel Offensive Campaign	12–16 September 1918	
	Verdun Sector	17–25 September 1918	
	Meuse-Argonne Offensive Campaign	26 September – 11 November 1918	

=== Notable personnel ===
- Lt. Norman S. Archibald, POW
- Lt. Walter L. Avery, DSC, 2 aerial victories (1st victory was Carl Menckhoff)
- Lt. Richard A. Blodgett, (KIA)
- Lt. Harold R. Buckley, DSC (2x)
- Lt. Edward Buford Jr., DSC, 2 aerial victories
- Lt. Wilfred V. Casgrain, POW
- Lt. Irby R. Curry, (KIA)
- Lt. Edward Peck Curtis, DSC, DSM, SSC, air ace 6 aerial victories
- Lt. Herbert R. Hall, SSC
- Lt. John A. Hambleton, DSC (2x), SSC (2x), 3 aerial victories
- Lt. Waldo E. Heinrichs, POW (also severely wounded)
- Lt. Lansing C. Holden Jr., DSC (2x), air ace 7 aerial victories
- Lt. James Knowles, Jr., DSC, SSC, air ace 5 aerial victories
- Lt. Stuart E. McKeown, POW
- Cpt. Alexander H. McLanahan, SSC
- Cpt. James E. Miller, DFC (KIA)
- Cpt. John Mitchell, DSC, 3 aerial victories
- Lt. Paul E. Montegue, POW
- Lt. Josiah J. Pegues, DSC, 2 aerial victories
- Capt. David McKelvey Peterson, DSC [OLC]x 2; 2 Aerial victories [with 95th Sq-out of 6 total]
- Lt. George W. Puryear, POW 1 aerial victory
- Lt. Lawrence H Richards, Croix De Guerre 1914–1918 http://schuylkillcountymilitaryhistory.blogspot.com/2008/08/fearless-fighters-of-sky-ww1-pilots.html
- Lt. Carlyle Rhodes, POW
- Lt. Quentin Roosevelt, Croix De Guerre with palm, (KIA) 1 aerial victory
- Lt. William M. Russell, (KIA)
- Lt. Sumner Sewall, DSC (2x), air ace 7 aerial victories
- Lt. William H. Taylor, DSC, 1 aerial victory (KIA)
- Lt. Sydney P. Thompson, MIA, Croix De Gurerre with Palm
- Lt. William H. Vail, DSC, SSC, 1 aerial victory
- Lt. Albert J. Weatherhead, SSC

DFC:Distinguished Flying Cross; DSC: Distinguished Service Cross; DSM: Army Distinguished Service Medal; SSC: Silver Star Citation; KIA: Killed in Action

== See also ==
- Organization of the Air Service of the American Expeditionary Force
- List of American Aero Squadrons
