= Villeneuve-les-Vertus Aerodrome =

Temporary World War I airfield in France

- Part of American Expeditionary Forces (AEF)
- Located near: Vertus, France
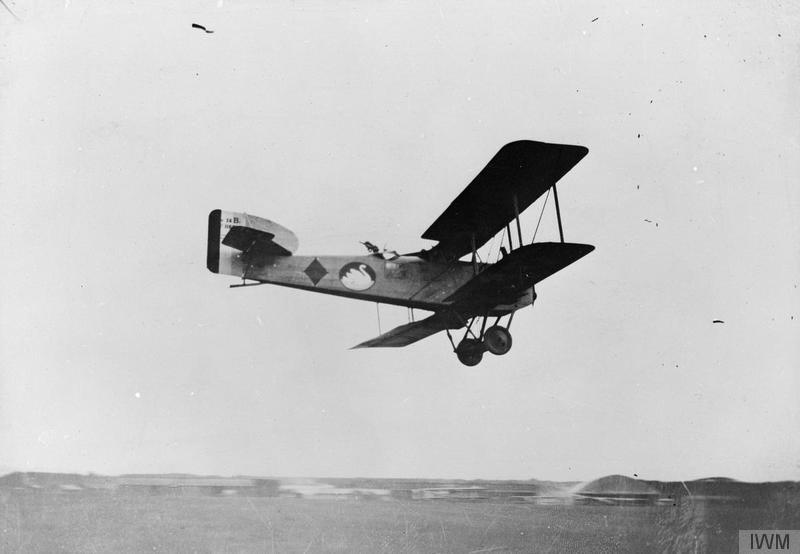
- French Breguet XIV airplane at Villeneuve airfield, 1917.

Site information
- Type: Combat Airfield
- Controlled by: Air Service, United States Army
- Condition: Agricultural area

Location
- Coordinates: 48°56′14″N 004°03′30″E

Site history
- Built: 1918
- In use: 1918–1919
- Battles/wars: World War I

Garrison information
- Garrison: 1st Pursuit Group (Elements); United States First Army Air Service

Villeneuve-les-Vertus Aerodrome was a temporary World War I airfield in France. It was located 3.4 miles (5.5 km) northeast of Vertus, in the Marne department in northeastern France.

== Overview ==
The airfield was built by the French Air Service in early 1917, widely used until the Armistice.

In January 1918, 1st Pursuit Organization and Training Center of formed by the American Air Service, to be eventually turned into an operational 1st Pursuit Group; as such, it was the first airfield in France used by the Americans for air combat operations on the Western Front.

The 94th Aero Squadron arrived at Villeneuve-les-Vertus Aerodrome to be part of the 1st POTC on 20 February 1918 without any aircraft, and it wasn't until two weeks later, on 8 March, that seven Nieuport planes arrived from Air Service Acceptance Park No. 1 at Orly Field, near Paris. However, the planes were unarmed. Despite this, the first flights of the Air Service were flown the next day, although due to the lack of armament, the pilots were not allowed to cross over the lines to enemy-controlled airspace. On 5 March, the 95th Aero Squadron arrived at the airfield, and the two squadrons started their operational training; accompanied by patrols from French "escadrilles", they would sometimes make trips to the front to get acquainted with the area.

By 1 April, both squadrons had moved to Epiez Aerodrome, then to Croix-de-Metz Aerodrome near Toul to take part in the formation of the 1st Pursuit Group on 5 May.

The airfield saw some activity with the French Air Service until May 1919, before being turned back to agricultural use. In May 1940, the field saw an RAF Fairey Battle squadron landing for some days, before being driven away by the German offensive through France; Messerschmitt fighters of the Luftwaffe also stayed here in June 1944, and finally American Stars and Stripes flew again over the grounds when USAAF ALG A.63 was set up in September 1944 for the Douglas C-47s of the 441 TCG (which stayed until early October (the shadow of the dismantled runway and taxiways were still showing in 1949). Today, what was Villeneuve-les-Vertus Aerodrome is a series of cultivated fields located north of Villeneuve-Renneville-Chevigny east of the Départmental 12 (D12), with no indications of its wartime uses.

== Known units assigned ==
- 94th Aero Squadron (Pursuit) 5 March-1 April 1918
- 95th Aero Squadron (Pursuit) 18 February-1 April 1918

== See also ==
- List of Air Service American Expeditionary Force aerodromes in France
