= David McKelvey Peterson =

World War I pilot

David M. Peterson
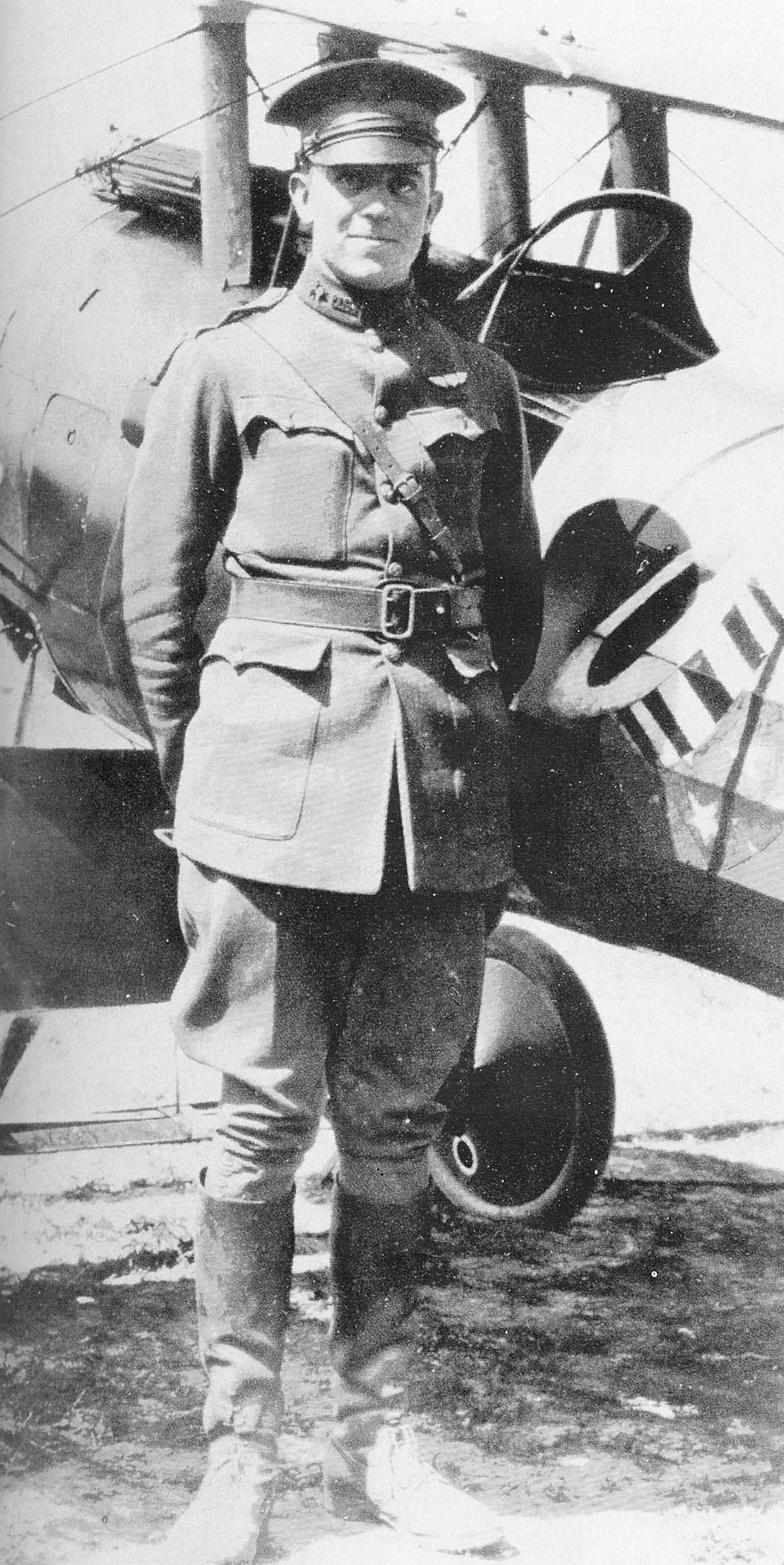
- Captain David M. Peterson, 94th Aero Squadron, Air Service, United States Army, shown at Gengault Aerodrome, Toul, France, April 1918
- Born: July 2, 1894; Honesdale, Pennsylvania
- Died: March 16, 1919 (aged 24); Daytona Beach, Florida
- Burial place: Glen Dyberry Cemetery, Honesdale, Pennsylvania, Plot: G / 36
- Military career
- Allegiance: United States
- Branch: Aéronautique Militaire (France); Air Service, United States Army
- Service years: 1916 – 1918 (France); 1918 – 1919 (USA)
- Rank: Major
- Units: Aéronautique Militaire: Escadrille N.124 (Lafayette Escadrille); Air Service, United States Army: 103d Aero Squadron; 94th Aero Squadron; 95th Aero Squadron
- Commands: 95th Aero Squadron
- Conflicts: World War I
- Awards: Distinguished Service Cross (2); Croix de Guerre

Major David McKelvey Peterson was a 1915 Lehigh University graduate who became a World War I flying ace. He achieved six aerial victories, one of which was earned in the Lafayette Escadrille; five were officially credited during his tenure with the United States Army Air Service.

He was killed in an aviation accident in Daytona Beach, Florida, on March 16, 1919.

== Biography ==
Born in Honesdale, Pennsylvania, on July 2, 1894, Peterson joined the French air service in 1916. He gained his first victory while in the Lafayette Escadrille, on September 19, 1917. Commissioned as a captain in the United States Army Air Service in January 1918, he was one of seventeen pilots in the French air service to be assigned to the original flying echelon of the American 103rd Aero Squadron on February 19, 1918. This echelon was the first unit of the Air Service to see combat in World War I.

Peterson transferred to the 94th Aero Squadron, flying a Nieuport 28, and scored his first victories in American service, on May 3 and twice on May 15. Two days later, he became a Flight Commander in the 95th Aero Squadron, scoring his fifth win. Three days later, he tallied his final victory.

He was awarded two Distinguished Service Crosses. The citation for the first was:

"For extraordinary heroism in action near Luneville, France, on May 3, 1918. Leading a patrol of three, Captain Peterson encountered five enemy planes at an altitude of 3,500 meters and immediately gave battle. Notwithstanding the fact that he was attacked from all sides, this officer, by skilful maneuvering, succeeded in shooting down one of the enemy planes and dispersing the remaining four."

The citation for the second was:

"For extraordinary heroism in action near Thiaucourt, France, on May 15, 1918. While on patrol alone, Captain Peterson encountered two enemy planes at an altitude of 5,200 meters. He promptly attacked despite the odds and shot down one of the enemy planes in flames. While thus engaged he was attacked from above by the second enemy plane, but by skilful manoeuvering he succeeded in shooting it down also."

His recognized aerial victories included:

Date Time Unit Opponent Location

- 1 Sep 19, 1917, 1540, N124 Albatros D.V Montfaucon
- 2 May 3, 1918, 1040, 94 Scout Amenencourt
- 3 May 15, 1918, 1205, 94 Rumpler C Thiaucourt
- 4 May 15, 1918, 1210, 94 Rumpler C Thiaucourt
- 5 May 17, 1918, 2100, 95 LVG C.VI Saint-Mihiel
- 6 May 20, 1918, 95 Two-seater Pont-a-Mousson

== Post-war flying career and death ==
Post-war, Peterson was killed in an aviation accident in Daytona Beach, Florida, on March 16, 1919.

An American Legion Post in Honesdale was named after him.

== See also ==
- List of World War I flying aces from the United States
- Lafayette Flying Corps
- 103d Aero Squadron

== Bibliography ==
- Looking Backward, A Lehigh University Scrapbook, Lehigh University, 1991
- Nieuport Aces of World War 1. Norman Franks. Osprey Publishing, 2000. ISBN 1-85532-961-1, ISBN 978-1-85532-961-4.
- American Aces of World War 1 Harry Dempsey. Osprey Publishing, 2001. ISBN 1-84176-375-6, ISBN 978-1-84176-375-0.
