= Davenport Johnson =

American Army Air Forces general

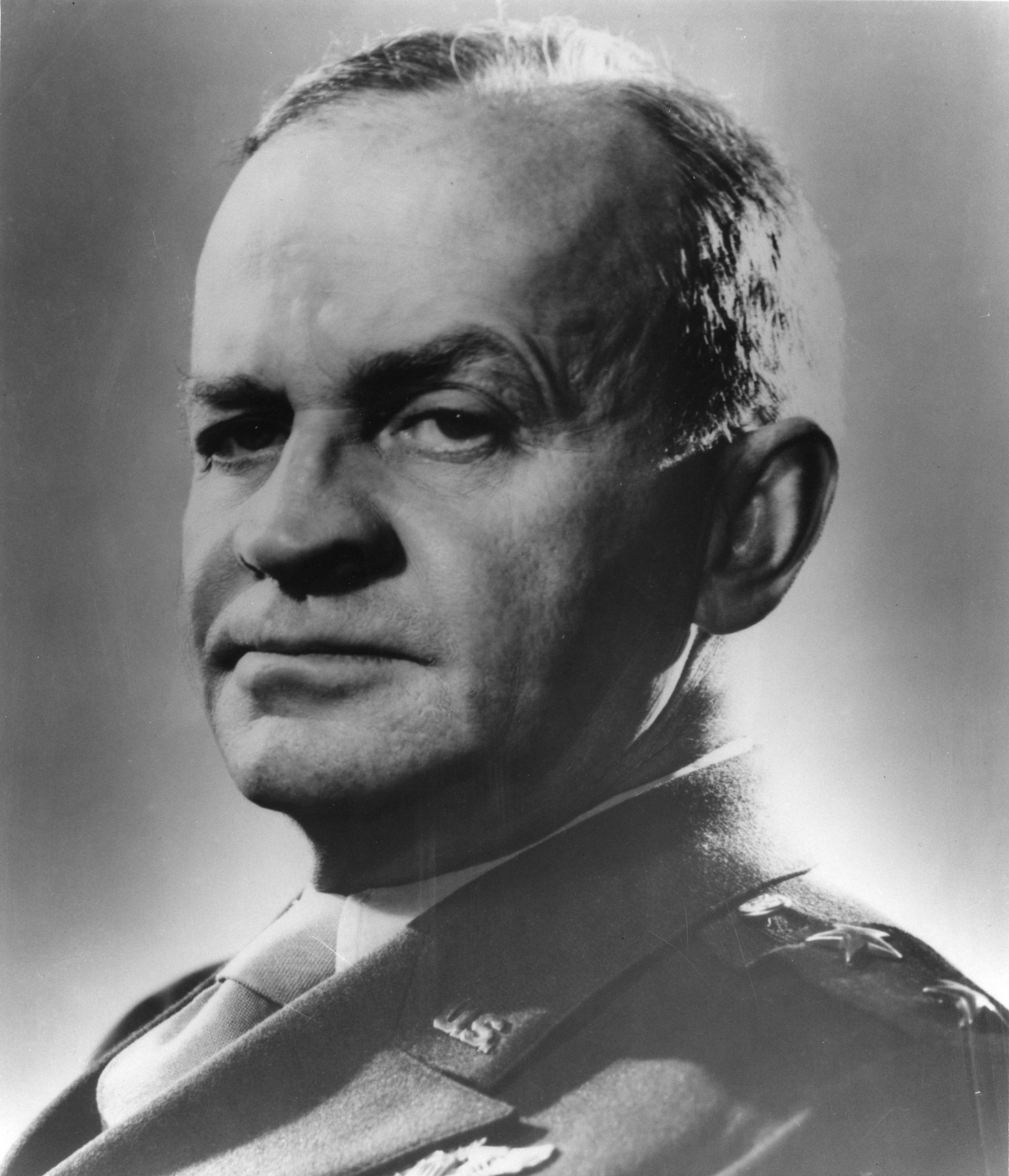
- Born: 28 March 1890; Tyler, Texas
- Died: 21 October 1963 (aged 73) Denver, Colorado
- Branch: United States Army Air Forces
- Service years: 1912–1945
- Rank: Major General
- Commands: Eleventh Air Force; Second Air Force; Sixth Air Force; 7th Bombardment Group; 3rd Attack Group; 1st Observation Squadron; 1st Wing; 1st Pursuit Group; 2nd Pursuit Group; 95th Aero Squadron
- Conflicts: World War I; World War II
- Awards: Silver Star; Legion of Merit; Distinguished Flying Cross; Purple Heart; Air Medal

Davenport Johnson (28 March 1890 (Note: Military Academy, Army and Air Force records list his date of birth as 28 March, but his gravestone is engraved 26 March.) – 21 October 1963) was a United States Army Air Forces major general. During World War II, he commanded the Eleventh Air Force in Alaska from November 1943 to November 1945.

== Early life and education ==
Born in Tyler, Texas, Johnson graduated from the United States Military Academy in June 1912. He later graduated from the Command and General Staff School in June 1926 and the United States Army War College in June 1929.

== Military career ==
Johnson was commissioned as an infantry officer and served with the 19th Infantry Regiment in Oklahoma, Texas and Mexico. In February 1916, he was sent to the Aviation Section, Signal Corps School in San Diego, California. After training, he served with the 1st Aero Squadron in New Mexico and Mexico. In February 1917, he was sent to France as an observer and student.

=== World War I ===
Johnson was given command of the 95th Aero Squadron from March to June 1918. He then helped organize the 2nd Pursuit Group and participated in the St. Mihiel offensive. He accepted a temporary promotion to lieutenant colonel on 24 September 1918 and participated in the Meuse–Argonne offensive. Johnson was awarded the Silver Star and the Purple Heart for his World War I service.

=== Between wars ===
Johnson assumed command of the 2nd Pursuit Group in March 1919. Returning to the United States, he assumed command of the 1st Pursuit Group in June 1919 at Selfridge Field in Michigan. In August 1919, Johnson assumed command of the 1st Wing and Kelly Field in Texas. In February 1920, he reverted to his permanent rank of captain. On 1 July 1920, he was formally transferred to the Army Air Service and promoted to major.

From August 1922 to July 1923, Johnson was given command of the 1st Observation Squadron at Mitchel Field on Long Island. In February 1930, Johnson assumed command of the 3rd Attack Group and Fort Crockett at Galveston, Texas. He was relieved of command in June 1932 and took a Military Intelligence assignment in Washington, D.C. Johnson was promoted to lieutenant colonel on 1 August 1935.

Johnson received a temporary promotion to colonel on 26 August 1936 and assumed command of the 7th Bombardment Group at Hamilton Field in California. From November 1936 to February 1938, he was post commander at Hamilton Field. From March 1938 to October 1940, Johnson was post commander at Chanute Field in Illinois.

Johnson received a temporary promotion to brigadier general on 2 October 1940 and was assigned as an assistant to the chief of the Air Corps in Washington, D.C. In July 1941, he became an assistant to the commanding general of the Caribbean Air Forces in Panama. Johnson received a temporary promotion to major general on 5 August 1941 and then assumed command of the Caribbean Air Forces in September 1941. His permanent rank was later increased to colonel on 1 February 1942.

=== World War II ===
After United States entry into the war, the Caribbean Air Forces were redesignated as the Sixth Air Force. In February 1943, Johnson assumed command of the Second Air Force at Colorado Springs, Colorado training bomber crews for overseas deployment. In November 1943, he assumed command of the Eleventh Air Force in Alaska. He was awarded the Legion of Merit, the Distinguished Flying Cross and the Air Medal for his World War II service.

Johnson retired from active duty in the Army Air Forces on November 30, 1945. He was transferred to the United States Air Force retired list in 1947.

== Later life ==
Johnson and his wife Manon (Craig) Johnson (18 December 1891 – 8 June 1964) lived in Colorado Springs, Colorado after his retirement. He died in Denver in 1963. Johnson and his wife are buried at Arlington National Cemetery.
