= Sumner Sewall =

American politician, 58th Governor of Maine (1897–1965)

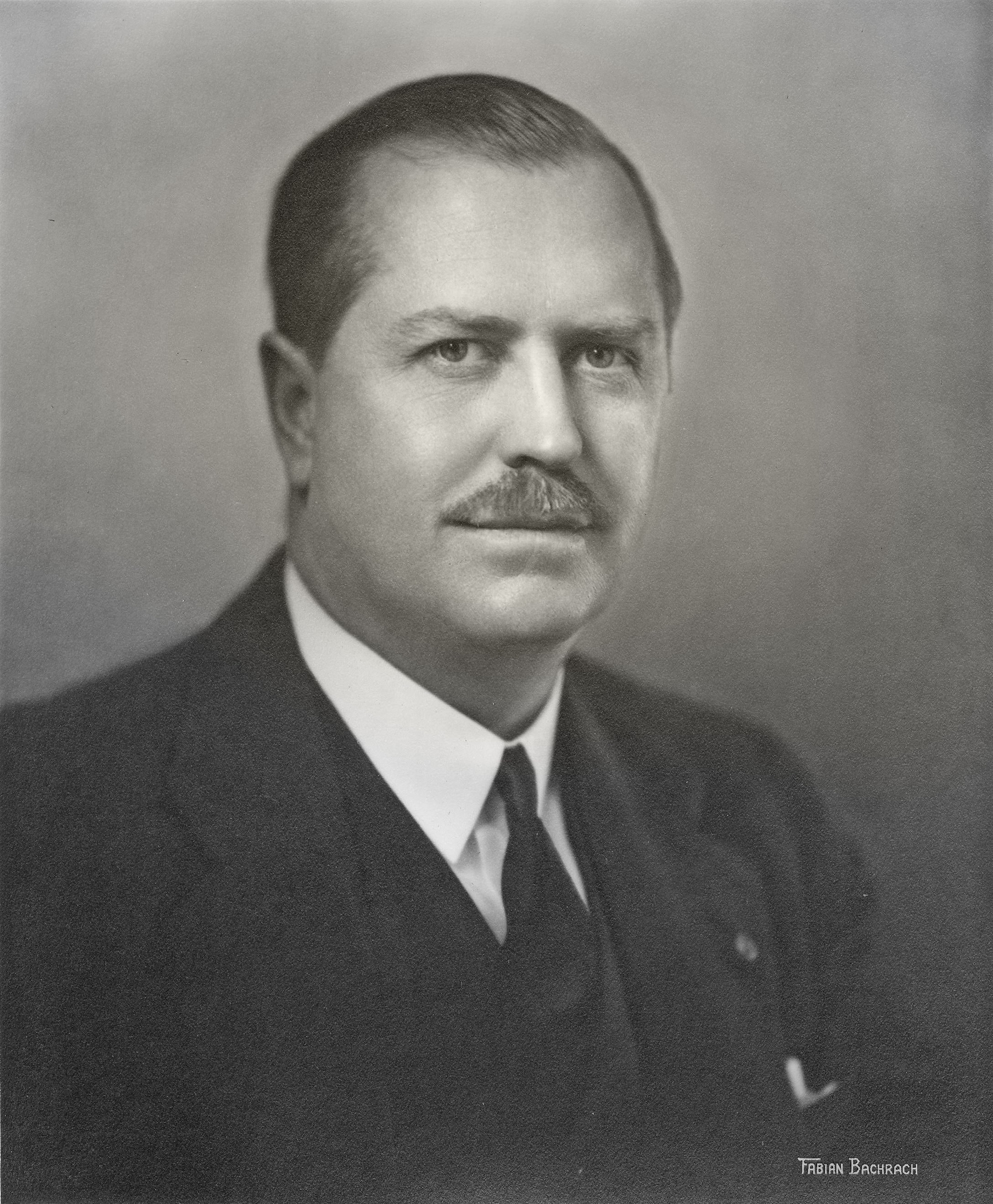

58th Governor of Maine
- In office January 1, 1941 – January 3, 1945
- Preceded by: Lewis O. Barrows
- Succeeded by: Horace Hildreth

Member of the Maine Senate
- In office 1936–1940

Member of the Maine House of Representatives
- In office 1934–1936

Personal details
- Born: June 17, 1897 Bath, Maine, U.S.
- Died: January 25, 1965 (aged 67) Bath, Maine, U.S.
- Resting place: Oak Grove Cemetery, Bath, Maine
- Party: Republican
- Education: Harvard College
- Profession: Businessman, politician, airman
- Awards: Distinguished Service Cross with Oak Leaf Cluster, Croix de Guerre (France), Legion of Honour (France), Order of the Crown (Belgium)

Military service
- Allegiance: United States
- Branch/service: Air Service, United States Army
- Years of service: 1917–1919
- Rank: Captain
- Unit: 95th Aero Squadron
- Battles/wars: World War I

Sumner Sewall (June 17, 1897 – January 25, 1965) was an American Republican politician and airline executive who served as the 58th governor of Maine from 1941 to 1945. He began his aviation career during World War I as a fighter ace.

Sewall was a candidate for the United States Senate in 1948, losing to Margaret Chase Smith in the Republican primary. His wife, Helen, was infamous for saying “Why send a woman to Washington when you can get a man?”

== Life and career ==
A native of Bath, Maine, Sewall dropped out of Harvard College in 1917 to go to Europe to aid the Allies during World War I. Sewall served first in the American Ambulance Field Service from February through August 1917, then in the U.S. Army Signal Corps, then finally as a fighter pilot in the U.S. Army Air Service, becoming an ace by scoring seven victories.

He enlisted in the USAAS in Paris, underwent training, and reported to the 95th Aero Squadron in February 1918. He was promoted to Flight Commander, and went on to score five victories over enemy planes between 3 June and 18 September 1918, sharing a couple of them with future general James Knowles and Edward Peck Curtis. Sewall then became a balloon buster, shooting down an observation balloon each on 4 and 5 November. The only victory he did not receive credit for came when German pilot Leutnant Heinz Freiherr von Beaulieu-Marconnay mistakenly landed on the 95th Aero Squadron's airfield, and Sewall and a couple of other American pilots captured him at gunpoint.

Sewall returned home with the Distinguished Service Cross with oak leaf cluster, the French Legion of Honor, the Croix de Guerre and the Order of the Crown of Belgium.

After the war, he worked in a variety of jobs, including being an executive with Colonial Air Transport and a director of United Air Lines.

His political career began when he became an alderman in Bath in 1933. He was elected to the Maine state legislature as a representative in 1934, then as a senator in 1936 and 1938. After the latter election, he was named President of the State Senate. In 1940, he was elected governor, and served two terms. Sewall's administration was notable for cleaning up scandals in state government and passing a minimum wage law for state teachers.

After stepping down as governor, Sewall became president of American Overseas Airlines for a year, then served as the military governor of Württemberg-Baden from 1946 to 1947. In 1948, Sewall finished a distant third in the Republican primary for Maine's open United States Senate seat, which ended his political career.

Sewall became president of the Bath National Bank in the 1960s. He died on 25 January 1965.

== Family ==
Sewall's parents were William Dunning Sewall and Mary Locke Sumner of Shrewsbury, Massachusetts. Mary was the daughter of George Sumner and Sarah E. Richardson, and she was great-granddaughter of the Reverend Joseph Sumner of the First Congregational Church in Shrewsbury. William D. Sewall and Mary Locke Sumner lived at the Sewall Family Home in Bath, ME known as York Hall.

Sewall's grandfather, Arthur Sewall, was the Democratic candidate for vice president in 1896.

Sewall married Helen Ellena Evans in 1929. They had two sons, David and Nick, and a daughter Alexandria.

== See also ==
- List of World War I flying aces from the United States

== Bibliography ==
- American Aces of World War I. Norman Franks, Harry Dempsey. Osprey Publishing, 2001. ISBN 1-84176-375-6, ISBN 978-1-84176-375-0.
- Gunther, John. Inside U.S.A. New York : Curtis, 1947. 487–489.
- Leviero, Anthony. "Low Salary Bars La Follette Job." New York Times 8 October 1947: 17.
- "Mrs. Smith wins in Maine race for Senate; Gov. Hildreth concedes." New York Times 22 June 1948: 1.
- "Past President: Sumner Sewall, Republican, 1939–1940"

Party political offices
Preceded by Lewis O. Barrows	Republican nominee for Governor of Maine; 1940, 1942	Succeeded by Horace Hildreth
Political offices
Preceded by Lewis O. Barrows	Governor of Maine; 1941–1945	Succeeded by Horace A. Hildreth
