= James Knowles (aviator) =

James Knowles Jr.
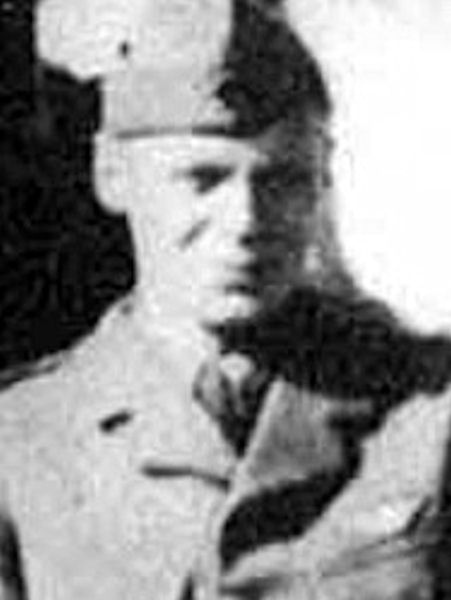
- Lieutenant James Knowles, Jr, 95th Aero Squadron, 1918
- Born: December 27, 1896; Cincinnati, Ohio, U.S.
- Died: February 20, 1971; St. Louis, Missouri, U.S.
- Military career
- Allegiance: United States
- Branch: Air Service, United States Army
- Service years: 1917 - 1919
- Rank: Lieutenant
- Unit: 95th Aero Squadron
- Conflicts: World War I
- Awards: Distinguished Service Cross with Oak Leaf Cluster, French Croix de Guerre, Aero Club of America Medal

Lieutenant James Knowles Jr. (December 27, 1896 – February 20, 1971) was an American World War I flying ace credited with five aerial victories. He was one of the final aces in the war.

Knowles was a Harvard student who was accepted into the U.S. Army Air Service in April 1917. In June 1918, he reported to the 95th Aero Squadron for duty as a Spad XIII pilot. Between 25 July and 8 November 1918, he shot down three German Fokker D.VIIs and two Rumpler reconnaissance planes; one of the latter victories was shared with Sumner Sewall and three other pilots. He came out of the war as an ace with the Distinguished Service Cross with Oak Leaf Cluster, the Croix de Guerre, and the Aero Club of America Medal.

== See also ==
- List of World War I flying aces from the United States

== Bibliography ==
- American Aces of World War I. Norman Franks, Harry Dempsey. Osprey Publishing, 2001. ISBN 1-84176-375-6, ISBN 978-1-84176-375-0.
