= Orly Air Base =

Former US Air Force facility in France

Orly Air Base American Air Service Acceptance Park No. 1 Advanced Landing Ground (ALG) A-47
- Part of Air Service, American Expeditionary Forces; United States Air Forces in Europe (USAFE)
- Located near: Paris, France
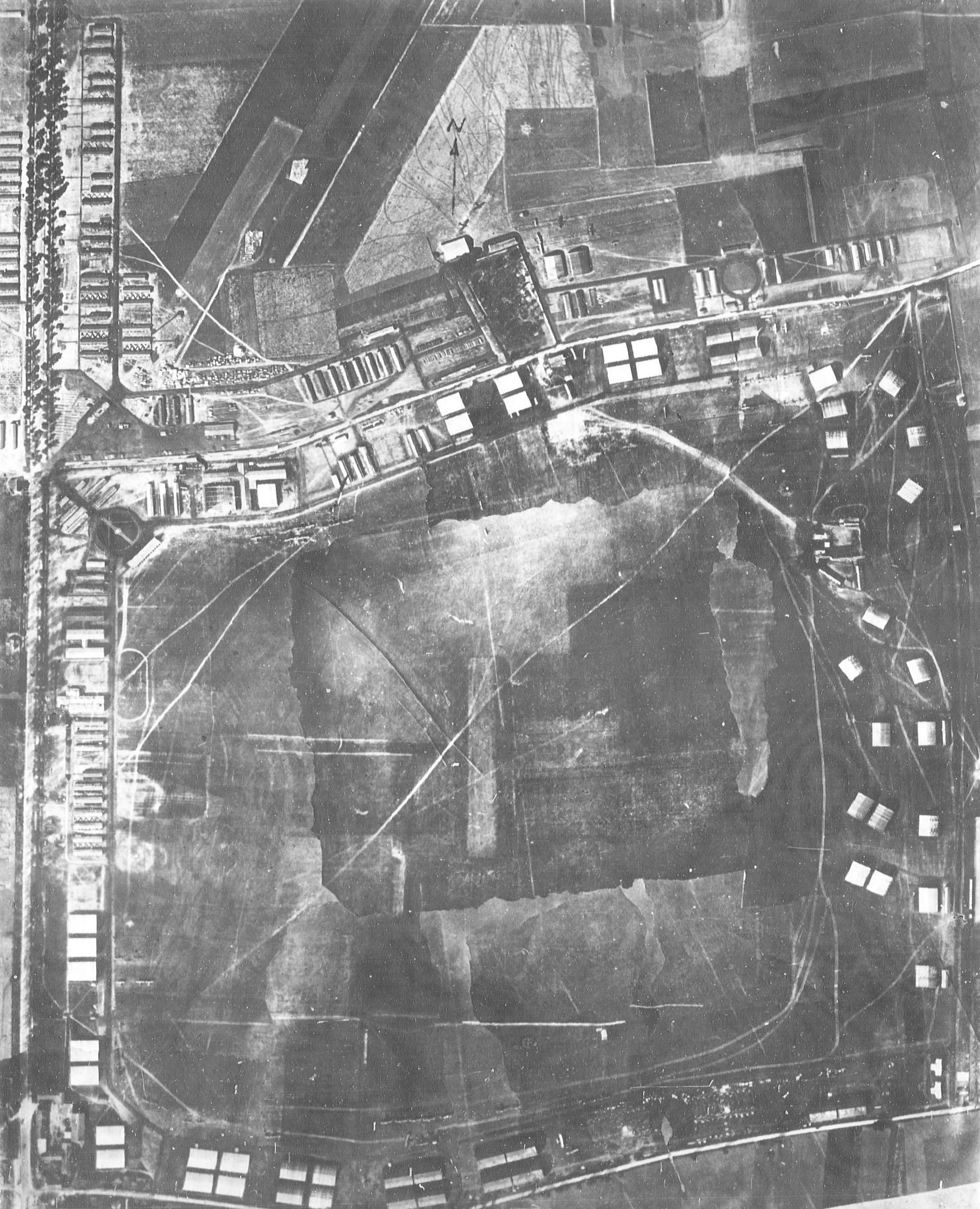
- American Air Service Acceptance Park No. 1, 1919

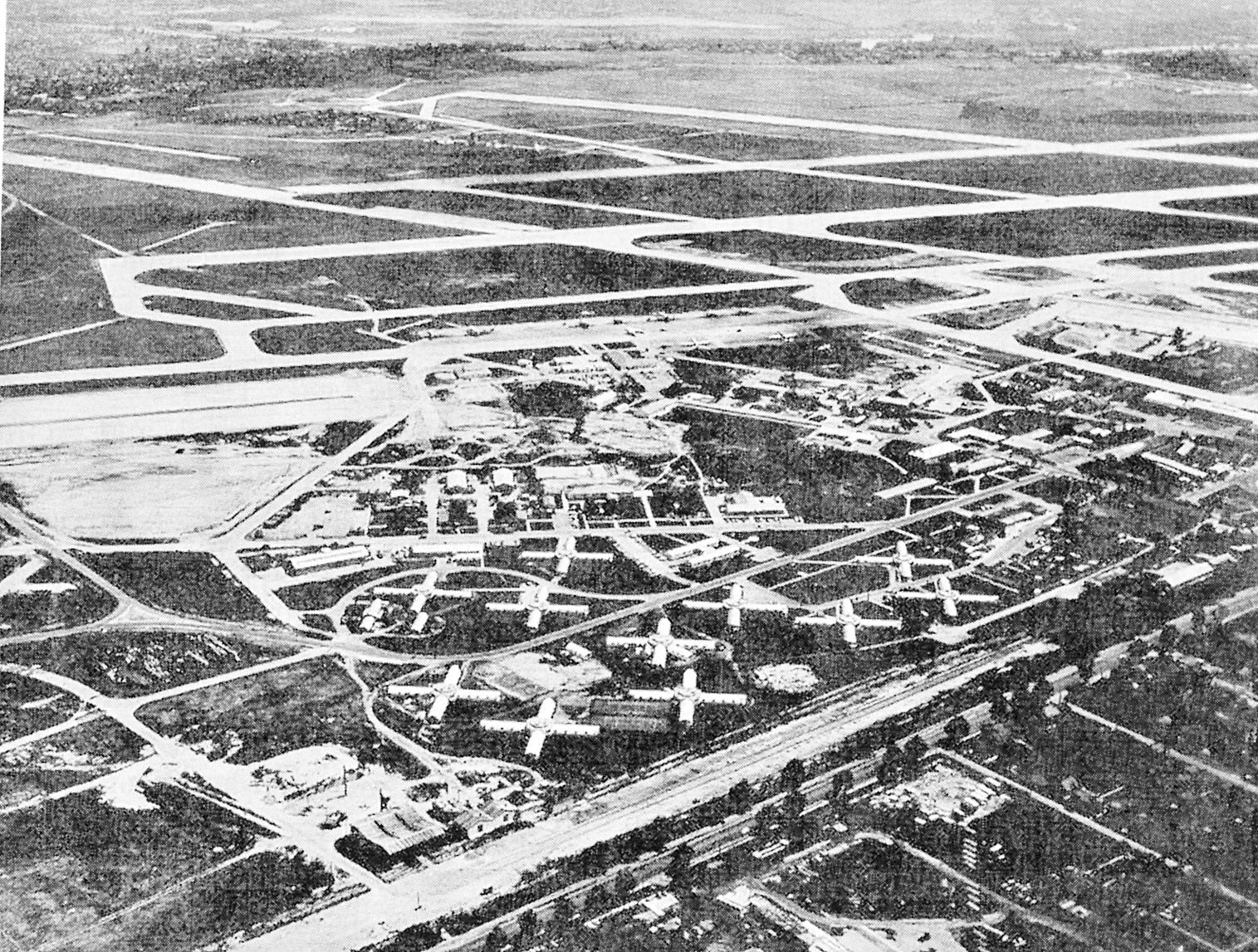
- Orly Air Base - 1955

Site information
- Controlled by: Air Service, United States Army (1918–1919); Luftwaffe (National Socialist) (1940–1944); United States Army Air Forces (1944–1947); United States Air Force (1947–1967)

Location
- Coordinates: 48°44′02″N 002°22′30″E

Site history
- Built: 1918
- In use: 1918–1919; 1940–1967
- Battles/wars: World War I; World War II

Orly Air Base was a United States Air Force Facility during the early part of the Cold War, located at Aéroport de Paris-Orly, 15 kilometres (9 mi) south of Paris, France. The American Air Base was located on the north side of the airport, in an area east of the current-day Val-de-Marne/Essonne.

The facility was first developed as a military airfield by the Air Service, American Expeditionary Forces (AEF) during World War I. With the end of the war, in 1920 it was eventually developed into a civil airport. After the 1940 Battle of France, the occupying German Luftwaffe seized the facility and used it as a military airfield. In 1944, the Germans were driven out and it subsequently became an Advanced Landing Ground (ALG) designated A-47 for the United States Army Air Forces Ninth Air Force.

Rebuilt after the war as a joint civil/military airfield, the primary use of the base was to support Supreme Headquarters Allied Powers Europe (SHAPE) at Rocquencourt. Secondary functions were as a personnel processing center for inbound and outbound personnel assigned to France, and as a limited operational transport base. In 1967 the American military facilities were closed as a result of France's withdrawal from NATO's integrated military command.

== History ==
Paris Orly Airport's beginnings date to World War I, and the entry of the United States into the conflict on the Western Front. The Air Service, United States Army had no suitable combat aircraft of its own when it entered the conflict in April 1917, In order to provide an effective contribution to the Allied war effort, it would be required to obtain front-line combat aircraft from its British and French allies. As nearly all of the French aircraft factories were in the Paris area at the time, a place was necessary for the American Air Service to receive aircraft from the French manufacturers in the Paris area where they could be inspected, tested, equipped and be sent to the front line combat units.

A joint French and American military team inspected various locations in the Paris area. A suitable location of four fields was located on the Fontainebleau Road, 12 kilometres (7.5 mi) southeast of the center of Paris, and 1.5 kilometres (0.9 mi) northeast of the suburb of Orly. Today the location is part of the Greater City of Paris, the location of its headquarters being on the north side of the present-day Orly Airport in a built-up area at the southeast corner of the intersection of the Avenue de L'Europe and Rue d'Amsterdam (48°44′20″N 002°22′11″E),.

=== American Air Service Acceptance Park No. 1 ===
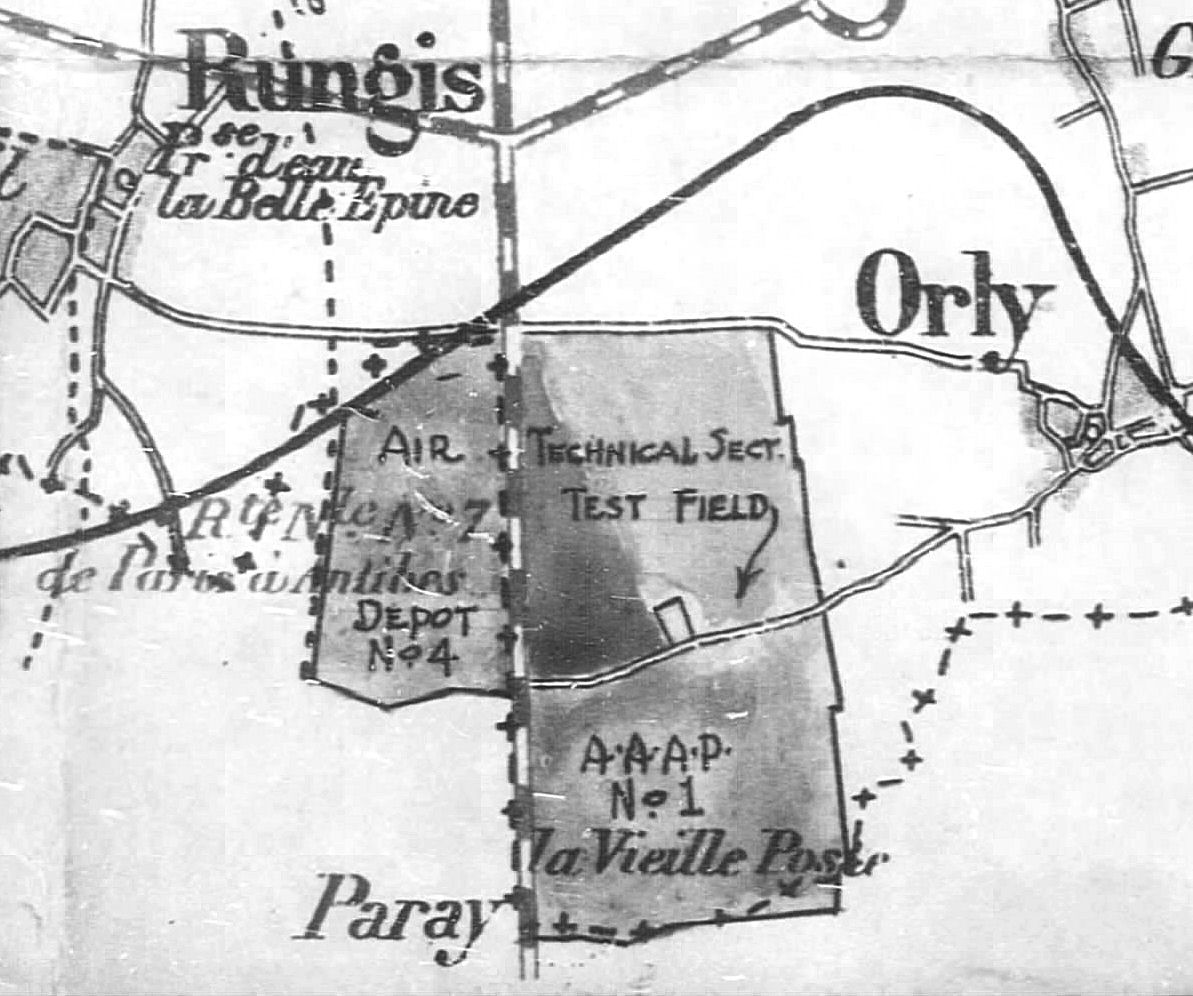
Map showing the locations of the three airfields that were used as part of the Air Service Acceptance Park No. 1

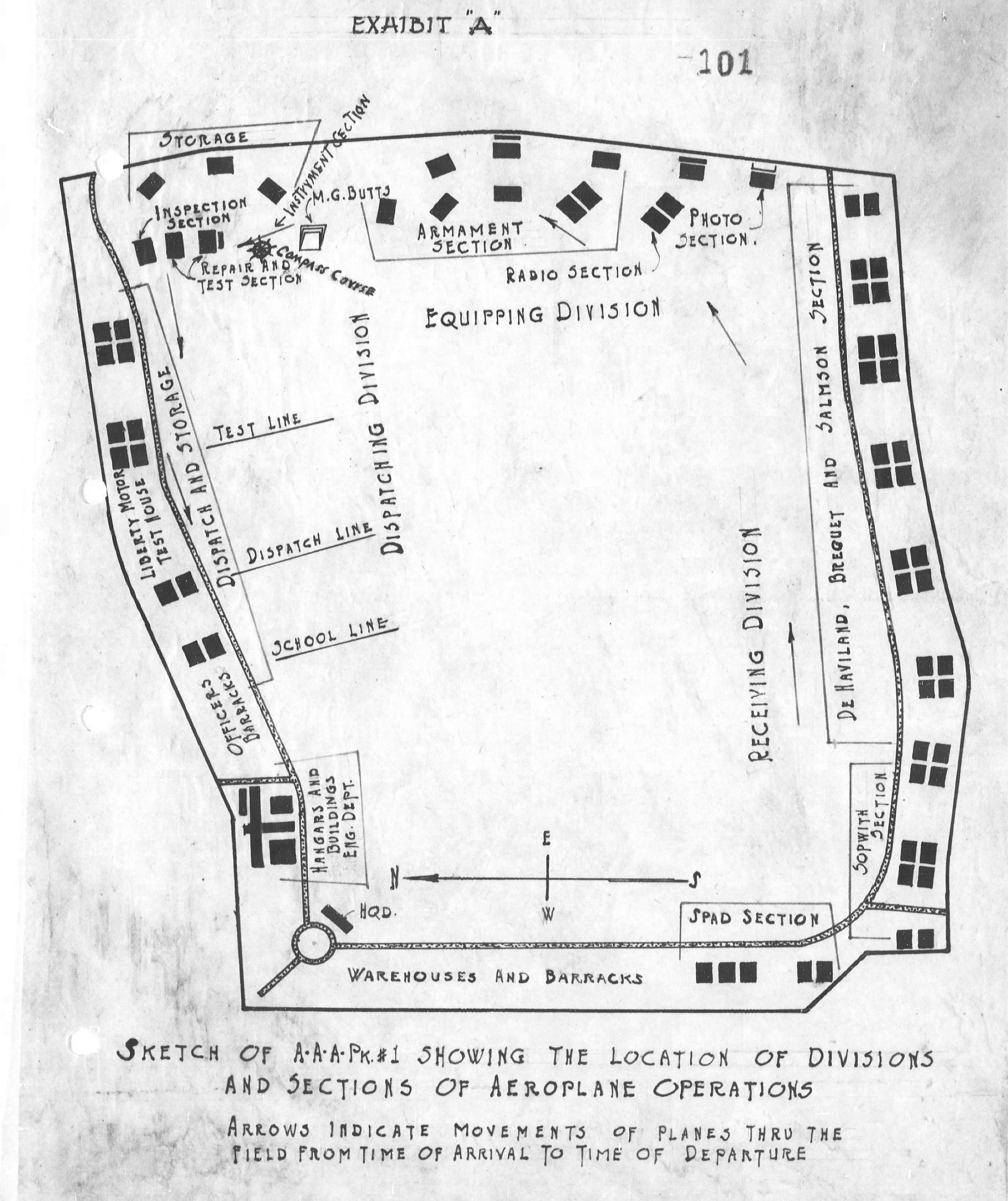
Layout of the main area of the Air Service Acceptance Park

The American Aviation Acceptance Park was formally established on 31 March 1918, when the 6th Company, 2d Regiment Air Service mechanics arrived from the 2d Air Instructional Center at Tours Aerodrome in central France in twenty-five trucks, and established themselves on the field. At the time there were only two wooden barracks partially completed at the site and it was not yet ready for use. The Americans slept in their trucks that night, being awakened at 2:30am by a German air raid by Gotha bombers. Later that day, the Americans completed the two barracks and started construction on a third one. Eventually the facility was converted into a large aviation facility generally known as Orly Aerodrome, with scores of buildings, 78 aircraft hangars, several kilometres of cinder and gravel roads, water, sewer, electrical, and telephone facilities. On Armistice Day, 11 November 1918, there were 323 officers and 2,283 enlisted men assigned.

The organizational structure included three main groups: Airplane Operations; Engineering, and Post Operations, which were, in turn, sub-divided into various divisions and sections. A parts depot (Air Depot No. 4), was never developed as such, and was used basically for parts storage to support the internal operations of Orly Field. The Post Operations group was concerned with the administration of the facility, such as security, provost, fire marshal, quartermaster department, the post office (APO 702) and other miscellaneous offices. During 1918, construction was an ongoing process at Orly and the war ended before it was fully completed. The Engineering Department was responsible for the various shops needed to repair aircraft. Aircraft rigging, installing aircraft engines, overhauling engines, sheet metal fabrication, electronics, carpentry, fuselage and wing repairs, rubber and tire vulcanizing and the like were performed by the unit.

Aircraft operations

The first meaningful use of Orly Aerodrome with the arrival of the first aircraft on 6 April 1918, when three Sopwith 1A2s landed at the field from Le Bourget Airport. The first aircraft was flown out on 20 April. During the first month of operation, a total of 37 aircraft were flown from Orly to the Front and to various training schools. At this early stage of operations, there were still few personnel assigned and much of the equipment for the Park had not yet arrived. The operations were very much makeshift until June, when the number of personnel had increased and considerably more equipment was available.

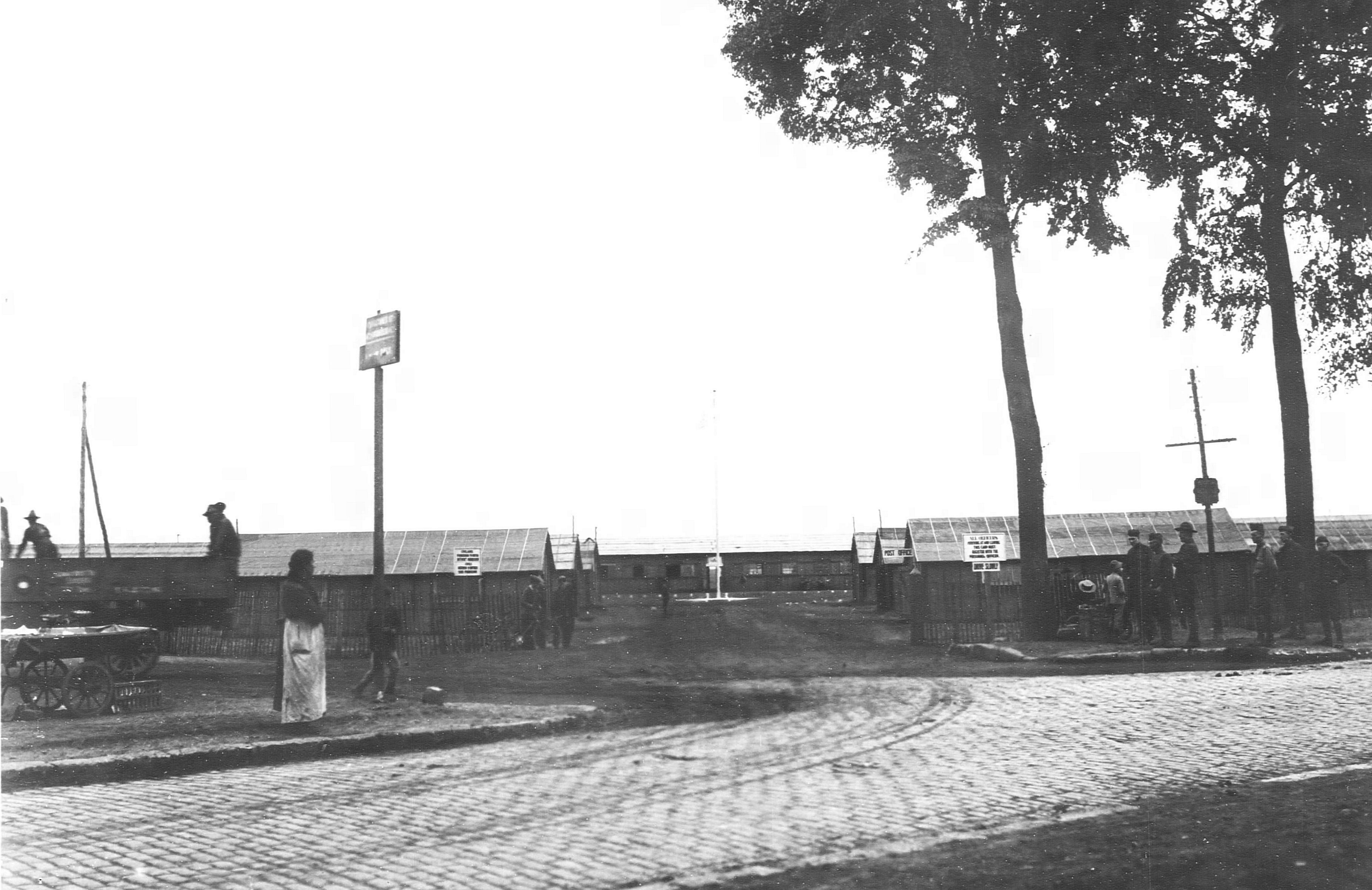
Air Service Acceptance Park No. 1 Headquarters

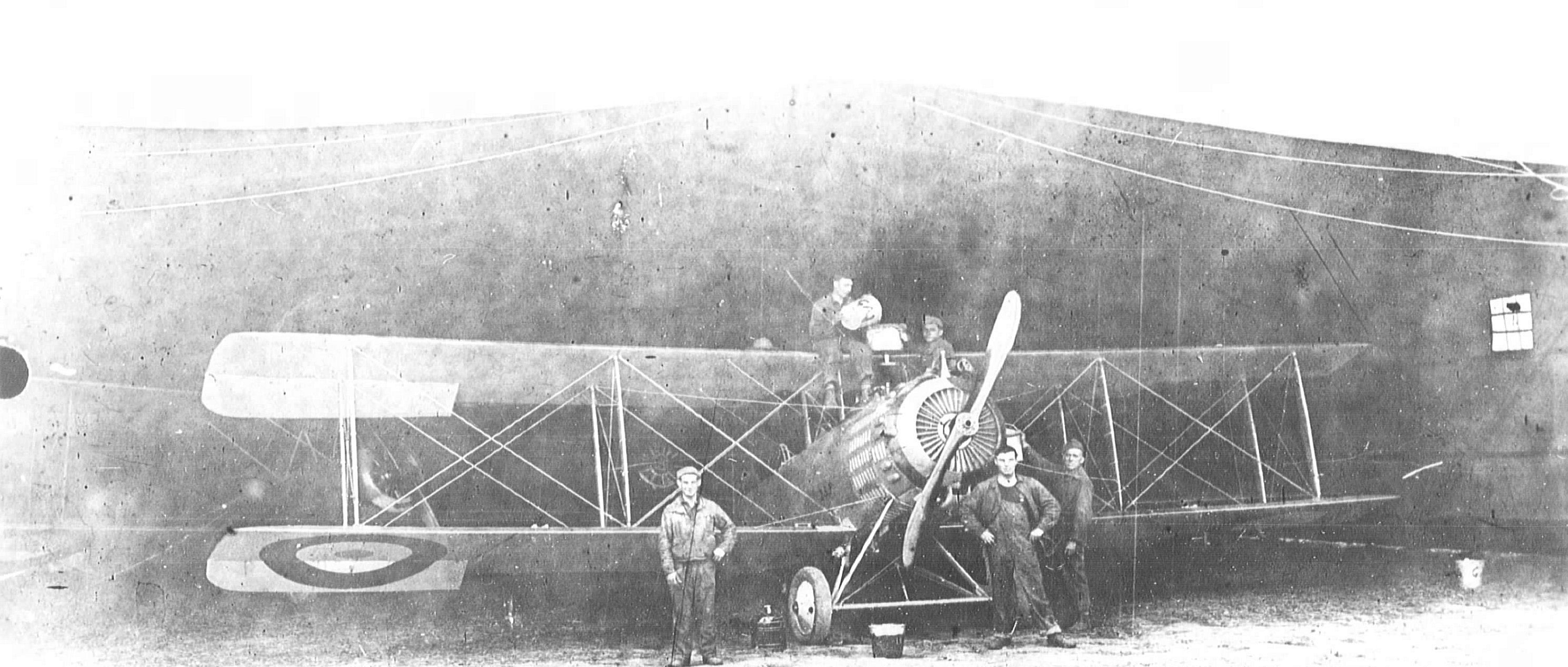
Salmson 2A2 Inspection

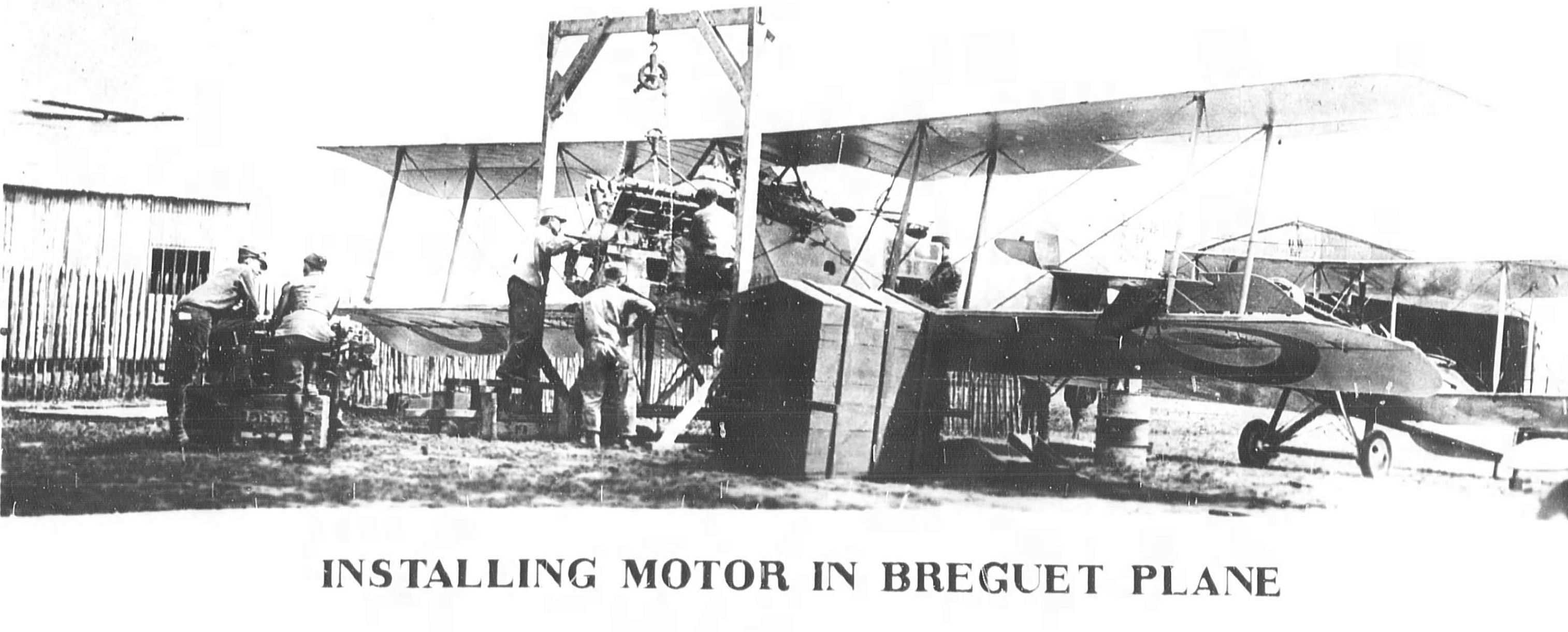
Engine Installation

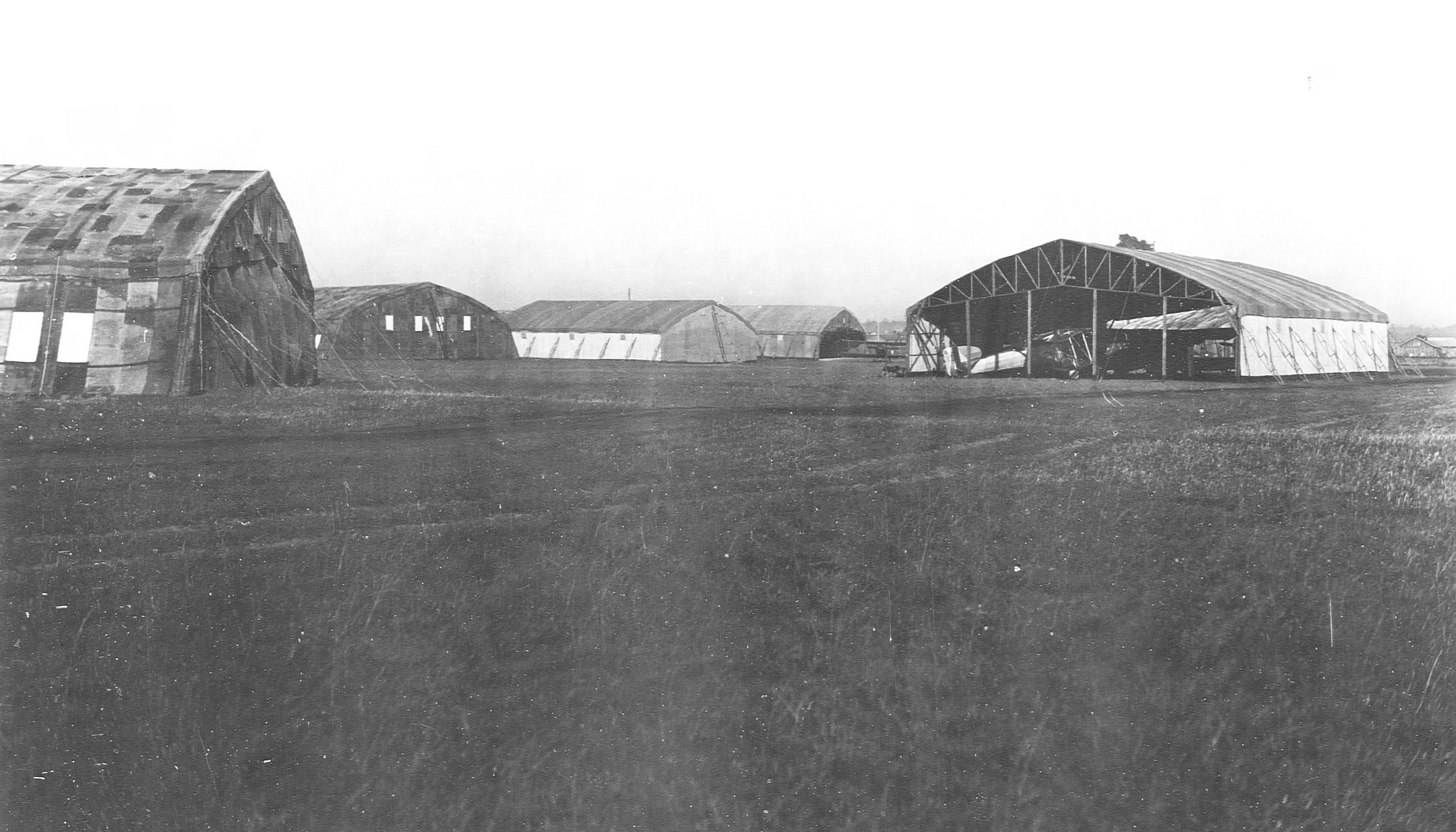
Airfield hangars

New aircraft aeeiving for acceptance at Orly were first directed to the Receiving Division. There were several sections for the various types of aircraft (SPAD, Sopwith, Salmson, etc.), being received. There, the section would perform a cursory inspection of the aircraft and determine if it needed additional equipment. If it needed a Radio, for example, it was transferred to the Radio Section. If it needed armament, it was sent to the Armament Section, etc. Once any necessary equipment was installed, the aircraft then was sent to the Inspection Section for a careful inspection to see that all corrections and any repairs necessary to the aircraft were made to insure it was ready for dispatch. After the inspection was passed, a thirty-minute flight test was made of the aircraft to verify its readiness.

Once fully inspected and flight-tested, the aircraft would either be flown out by ferry pilots assigned to the Dispatch Section to the 1st Air Depot for eventual combat operations or to one of the Training Schools. Planes to be sent directly into combat were sent fully equipped, while aircraft being sent as replacements were, as a rule, sent out partially or not equipped because guns, radios and other equipment could be installed either by the 1st Air Depot or the combat squadrons from stocks taken from salvaged planes there. By the time of the Armistice, the Air Service Acceptance Park No. 1 dispatched 1,809 aircraft, fully equipped and 332 planes unequipped. The average length of time between the arrival of an aircraft at Orly until it was Dispatched with a full complement of equipment was two or three days.

1,103 aircraft were sent to the various training schools throughout France, making a total of 3,244 aircraft processed by the Air Service Acceptance Park No. 1 at Orly. In cases where it was not on order, it was transferred to the Storage Section where it was placed in a hangar, awaiting dispatch. Each aircraft in storage was re-inspected every five days to insure it was ready for dispatch.

It was important that each aircraft flown into Orly be fully accounted for on a daily basis, and complete records of each aircraft, its condition, the amount of work done on it, the equipment installed was fully documented. Each night an inventory was made of all aircraft at the field which was sent to the Commanding Officer each morning, with a copy sent to Air Service headquarters at Chaumont and one to AEF headquarters in Paris.

Post-armistice operations

With the armistice with Germany on 11 November 1918, new aircraft being received by the Air Service ended, and the work at Orly began to be the return of French and British aircraft to their respective governments. As the 1st Air Depot at Colombey-les-Belles Aerodrome was the designated demobilization center for the Air Service, foreign aircraft flown by combat organizations and also at the training schools were received by the 1st Air Depot when the various units were ordered to demobilize. These aircraft, along with the records maintained for each one were ferried to Orly over the winter of 1918-1919 and then flown to various locations in France where they were returned to their respective governments. By the beginning of February 1919, arrangements were being made with the French Government for them to take over the facilities at Orly, and the facility was ordered demobilized at the beginning of March, 1919. The Americans simply abandoned everything in place; turning it over to the French Government, and departed for home.

=== Inter-war period ===
With the peace re-established, in 1923, Eugène Freyssinet built two huge airship hangars at Orly which was developed and opened as Villeneuve-Orly Airport in 1932 as a secondary civil airport to Le Bourget. During the 1920s and 1930s, the airport's facilities expanded and grew.

=== World War II ===
==== German use ====
During the 1940 Battle of France, the airfield at Orly was used by the occupying German Luftwaffe shortly after its seizure in June 1940. The Luftwaffe moved elements of two fighter wings, Jagdgeschwader 21 (JG 21) and Jagdgeschwader 54 (JG 54), in June, both equipped with Messerschmitt Bf 109Es, and a bomber wing, Kampfgeschwader 51 (KG 51), equipped with Junkers Ju 88As taking part in the battle until the armistice on 22 June.

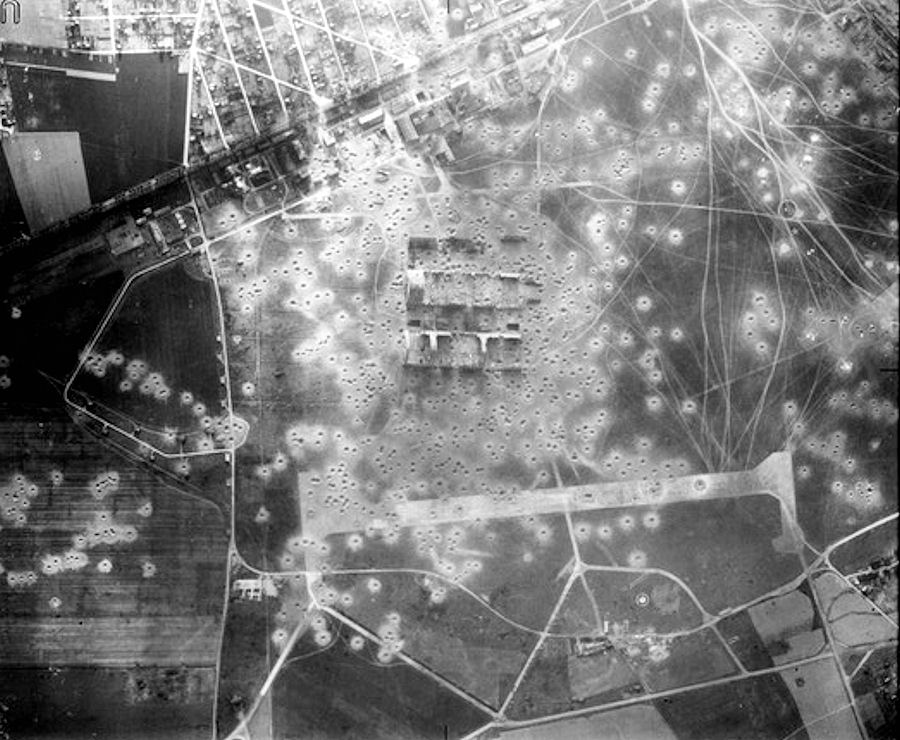
Orly Airfield after two Eighth Air Force bombing raids, taken on 6 June 1944. The Luftwaffe-controlled airfield would have one more heavy bomber attack on 25 June, when 18 B-17s would bomb the facility

After the armistice, the fighter units moved out, while KG 51 remained with its Ju 88s at Orly until March 1941, taking part in the Battle of Britain. When the bombers moved out, for about a year it was used by the Luftwaffe as a rest and rearmament airfield, with units from combat areas being withdrawn and stationed at Orly briefly until being redeployed. However, as part of the "Defense of the Reich" campaign by the Luftwaffe to defend against Allied bomber attacks, Orly in 1942 became a combat interceptor field, with Zerstörerschule 2 (ZG 2), flying Messerschmitt Bf 110 heavy twin-engine day interceptor aircraft.

Beginning in early 1944, Kampfgeschwader 6 (KG 6) and Kampfgeschwader 30 (KG 30) operated Junkers Ju 88As from Orly as part of Operation Steinbock, a late war German operation carried out by the Luftwaffe between January and May 1944 against targets in southern England, mainly in and around the London area during the night. The offensive marked the Luftwaffe's last large-scale bombing operation against England, and afterward only the V1 cruise missiles and V2 ballistic rockets were used for hitting the British Isles.

The American Eighth Air Force carried out three heavy bombing raids against Orly in May and June 1944 (Missions 359, 367 and 442). The heaviest being on 20 May when 90 Boeing B-17 Flying Fortresses bombed the airfield and a follow-up raid on 24 May when 151 B-24 Liberators again attacked it. By mid-July 1944, with the advancing Allied forces in Northern France, Ninth Air Force Martin B-26 Marauder light bomber and Republic P-47 Thunderbolt fighter-bombers began more frequent attacks, to deny the Luftwaffe use of the airfield as ground forces moved out of Normandy and into the Paris area. German use of the airfield ended in August when KG 30 pulled out and moved east to Achmer in northwest Germany.

==== Advanced Landing Ground (ALG) A-47 ====
After the Battle of Normandy and the liberation of Paris by Free French Forces in late August, elements of the IX Engineering Command 826th Engineer Aviation Battalion arrived at Orly on 27 August 1944. The two concrete runways were patched and the airfield was made operational as Advanced Landing Ground A-47 for transport units to fly Resupply and Casualty evacuation flights by the next day.

It took until 5 September until the 50th Fighter Group could move in and begin combat operations with P-47 Thunderbolts, however they only remained for a week until they moved out and Orly became a command and control field, with Liaison units using the field with light aircraft until October 1945.

=== Postwar use ===
Remaining in American hands after the war, the first postwar unit at Orly was an Air Transport Command (ATC) unit, the 1408th Army Air Force (AAF) Base Unit which arrived in early 1945. Orly Airport was heavily damaged by bombing raids during the war, and with the German Capitulation in May 1945, plans were made to reconstruct the facility and return it to civil control as Paris' main civil airport for Air France's international flights. ATC also operated a military air terminal at the older and smaller Le Bourget Airport (ALG A-54) until May 1946 when it was re-opened for commercial air travel and Air France re-established its major aircraft maintenance facilities at the field and for domestic service. At both Orly and Le Bourget Airports, ramp space was becoming more and more crowded.

However, the American military and political leadership preferred Orly Airport when going to meetings in Paris, or traveling southeast to Foutainebleau, or west to Camp des Loges and Rocquencourt. After reconstruction was completed, Orly was formally returned to the French Government on 7 November 1947, with the United States Air Force 1630th Air Base Squadron leasing a small portion on the east side of the Airport and operated the American military air terminal. The ATC facilities at Le Bourget were closed and consolidated at Orly. The amount of diplomatic and military air travel into Orly increased steadily in the late 1940s as long-distance travel was changing from ship and rail transport to airliners, and the leased facilities at Orly grew to accommodate the large, four engine C-54 Skymasters and VIP airliners. for meetings.

=== Postwar U.S. use ===
==== Military Air Transport Service ====
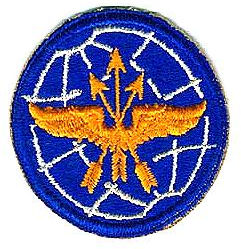

With the formation of the North Atlantic Treaty Organization (NATO) in 1949, the United States chose to leave its headquarters in West Germany and to create a duplicate command at NATO Headquarters in Paris. The joint United States European Command (EUCOM) was formed with Army and Air Force leadership establishing themselves in Paris (although EUCOM Headquarters remained in West Germany, as well as HQ USAFE and HQ USAREUR). An agreement was reached on 10 November 1950 on a new lease to allow for aircraft parking at Aeroport Orly-Paris, and the first NATO tenant was the Military Air Transport Service (MATS) 1630th Air Base Squadron. which was activated in June 1950. The space at Orly also allowed for five usable Quonset huts to accommodate a military terminal and ground support personnel.

On 1 April 1951 the 1630th Air Base Squadron was expanded to support the air transport needs of Supreme Headquarters Allied Powers Europe (SHAPE), which was activated on the same day in Fontainebleau. By October 1951, the expansion of Orly's facilities was so great as to require a higher headquarters organization; accordingly the 1630th AB Squadron was upgraded to the 1606th Air Base Group. Other units assigned to the group were the 7407th Headquarters Squadron and the Paris APO Post Office (APO 55)

Another important mission developing at Orly Air Base was providing aircraft and facilities to maintain the flying proficiency of USAF pilots assigned to the Paris region. Due to the crowded conditions at Orly, USAF pilots used the nearby Melun Villaroche Aerodrome (Former ALG 55) 16 miles southeast of Orly until the USAF Évreux-Fauville Air Base was opened in 1955, an hour northwest of Orly.

==== United States Air Forces in Europe ====

On 1 July 1952, Headquarters, United States Air Forces in Europe (USAFE) assumed command of Orly Air Base because the majority of its work was in support of USAFE missions. The 7415th Air Base Group was formed as part of USAFE, the MATS unit was reduced to a detachment and made a tenant of the 7415th to manage passenger traffic. Its new designation was the 1602d Air Transport Wing Detachment. The 1606th ABGp was re-designated as the 7415th Air Base Group.

The primary mission of the 7415th ABG was meeting and greeting distinguished visitors (DVs) visiting the Paris region. These included President Eisenhower, the Secretaries of State and Defense, and those attending international and NATO meetings in Paris. From 1955 through 1959 approximately 800 DVs per month passed through Orly AB. Some summer months over 200 Congressmen would stop in Paris. A summit meeting in Europe could draw 1,100 to 1,350 DV guests. The 7415th protocol officers would have to provide aircraft parking, transportation and drivers, luncheons, photographers, press rooms, secure telephone communications, and security police. At four summit meetings, arrangements were made with Orly Airport management to close an active runway and use it for DV aircraft parking. Space at Orly was becoming critical in the late 1950s.

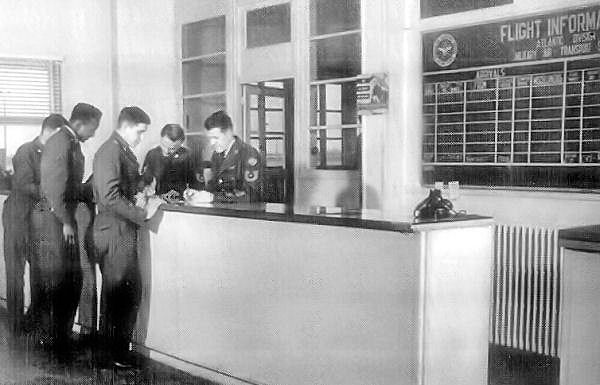
MATS Terminal Flight Information Desk at Orly Air Base, 1955

During the 1950s, the United States became very committed to building military facilities in France, and the Paris area became a center for activities of the Army and Air Force. In 1954, with the conflict in Korea over, plans were made to expand the facilities at Orly. The 1950 lease was re-negotiated to provide additional property for a headquarters building, officers club, NCO club, airmen's service club, personnel office, a new passenger terminal, billeting for 450 troops, a 500-man mess hall, motor vehicle shop, aircraft parking apron for fifteen assigned aircraft, and an expanded dispensary with twenty-five hospital beds.

Additional construction during 1954–55 completed the largest USAF air terminal in France, a new AFEX snack bar, a large service club, group headquarters building, fire station, Air Police center, officers open mess, BOQ, VIP billets, and a vehicle repair shop. Most buildings were single story concrete masonry construction, however a few portable prefab buildings were erected to save construction time and funds. Through the years, the detachment grew in importance and in January 1957 it became the 1622nd Support Squadron (MATS). The 1622nd was responsible for handling passengers, cargo and mail passing through the base. During its first year (1957) the 1622nd processed a total of more than 103,000 passengers, 49,000 tons of cargo, 4,290 aircraft and 12,100 tons of mail.

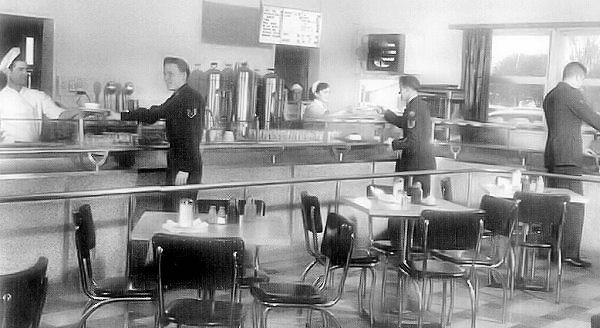
Snack Bar at the MATS Terminal, Orly Air Base, 1955

The air terminal at Orly replaced the troopship as the common carrier for USAF personnel heading to France. The 7113th Personnel Processing Squadron operated the Paris Air Passenger Center (PAPC) in Paris. PAPC processed 15,300 inbound and 21,100 outbound personnel during the last six months of 1957. Outbound Air Force troops were given a three-hour time block to report to PAPC, then moved by bus to Orly AB for their flight back to CONUS. The average processing time for inbound troops assigned to France was three hours. This time was measured from aircraft off-loading at Orly to bus off-loading at a Paris train station for their trip to their new assignments in France. By 1955 there were forty units attached to the 7415th ABG for administrative and logistical support around France. The 7415th operated fifteen C-47A Skytrains, one C-54G Skymaster, one C-121A Lockheed Constellation, and one Convair C-131B Samaritan aircraft based at Orly for VIP transportation within Europe (Special Air Support), and for proficiency flying. The 7415th Food Service section was always busy, preparing 4,600 in-flight meals per month for passengers on outbound military flights as well as operating the base mess hail for unit and transient personnel.

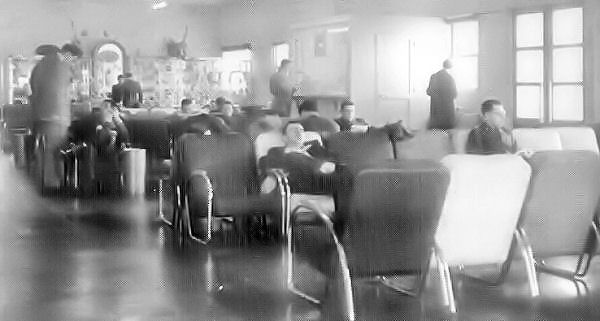
MATS Terminal flight waiting area, Orly Air Base, 1955

Also present at Orly AB was Detachment 2 of the 7370th Flight Service Squadron with headquarters located at Rhein Main AB, Germany. Other detachments of the Flight Service Squadron were located in Uxbridge (London), Rome, Madrid, Istanbul, Casablanca (Morocco) and Wheelus AB, Libya. The various centers maintained control over U.S. military air traffic. The center processed flight plans, monitored departure and arrival information and oversaw diplomatic clearances. Clearances for diplomatic flights were processed through Châteauroux-Déols Air Base prior to 1 July 1957. After that date Orly AB was designated as a foreign clearance base, thereby reducing request time for diplomatic clearances into the Middle East and Africa.

An official base newspaper The Orly Diplomat (6 pages 13 by 8 inches) was begun in June 1953 by TSGT John R. German, off a "rickety, ink-stained mimeo machine." The publication was renamed The Orly Oracle in 1955 and grew gradually until its final edition on 15 September 1958. TSGT John R. German, presided over the final, "souvenir" edition.

==== Operational use ====
Several special airlift operations were conducted from Orly Air Base. In 1954 USAF C-124 transports assisted the French by airlifting 500 paratroop/commandos and their equipment to Indochina, landing at Da Nang's Tourane Airfield. It was the longest troop airlift in history at that time. The troopers wore civilian clothes and departed Orly AB at 0310 hours in the morning. The C-124s continued across the Pacific to their home base, making the airlift an around-the-world flight.

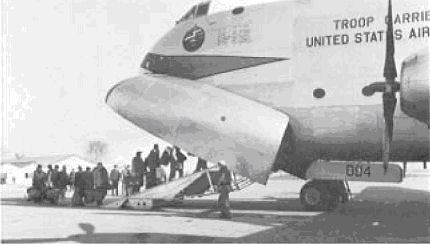
French military personnel board a Douglas C-124C Globemaster II (53-004) at Orly Field, Paris, bound for Indochina, 3 May 1954

A second airlift, "Operation Wounded Warrior'," made the longest medical evacuation flight when the first C-118Bs from Westover AFB, Massachusetts, landed at Orly on 3 July 1954. The aircraft was returning forty-seven wounded French soldiers from Saigon. These veterans had fought in the Battle of Dien Bien Phu. After boarding the wounded in Saigon, the C-118 "Liftmaster" flew eastward to Japan, Hawaii, California, Massachusetts, across the Atlantic to the Azores, and on to Paris. A total of 500 seriously wounded men were returned by USAF-MATS. The French Army and government officials were deeply appreciative of the airlift effort supplied by the United States.

From 1953 through 1958, USAFE operated "Kinderlift" flights during the months of July and August. This program flew about 2,000 underprivileged German children each year from Berlin to West Germany for a month's vacation in German and American homes. The 7415th ABG supplied aircraft and crews for 100 of these missions in 1957, flying 160 hours between Berlin and Rhein-Main Air Base or Hanover.

=== Phase-out and closure ===
Relations between the USAF and the civil Aéroports de Paris began to become contentious in the mid-1950s as the amount of air traffic at Orly grew and grew. In November 1955, the USAF was informed by the French civil authorities that most of the USAF facilities would have to be abandoned at the end of 1957 to allow for planned airport expansion. This demand by the French was passed up the chain of command through NATO and the State Department.

Negotiations between the United States and France were begun to find an alternative. Several of the new USAF air bases in France were proposed, Dreux-Louvilliers Air Base and Évreux-Fauville Air Base were already USAFE troop carrier bases, and were proposed as alternates, however no agreement could be made. The VIPs who used Orly Air Base liked the fact that it was only minutes away from their destinations in the Paris area and preferred the proximity of Orly to Paris. That, was that.

Orly International Airport was expanded several times during the late 1950s and 1960s and the relationship remained strained. The Orly Air Base operation continued until March 1967 when it was closed as part of the general American withdrawal from France as part of operation FRELOC. Orly Air Base was the last USAF facility in France to be closed.

Today a few of the former USAF buildings are still in use for industrial purposes, however most of what was Orly Air Base has been absorbed into Orly Airport and is used as a cargo handling and civil aircraft maintenance facility. The World War I Air Service facility has been obliterated, however it can be located by aligning current online maps and satellite images to the 1918 maps (on available in commons) to the previous road and rail network.

== See also ==
- List of Air Service American Expeditionary Force aerodromes in France
- Advanced Landing Ground
