= Épiez Aerodrome =

- Part of American Expeditionary Forces (AEF)
- Located near: Épiez-sur-Meuse, France
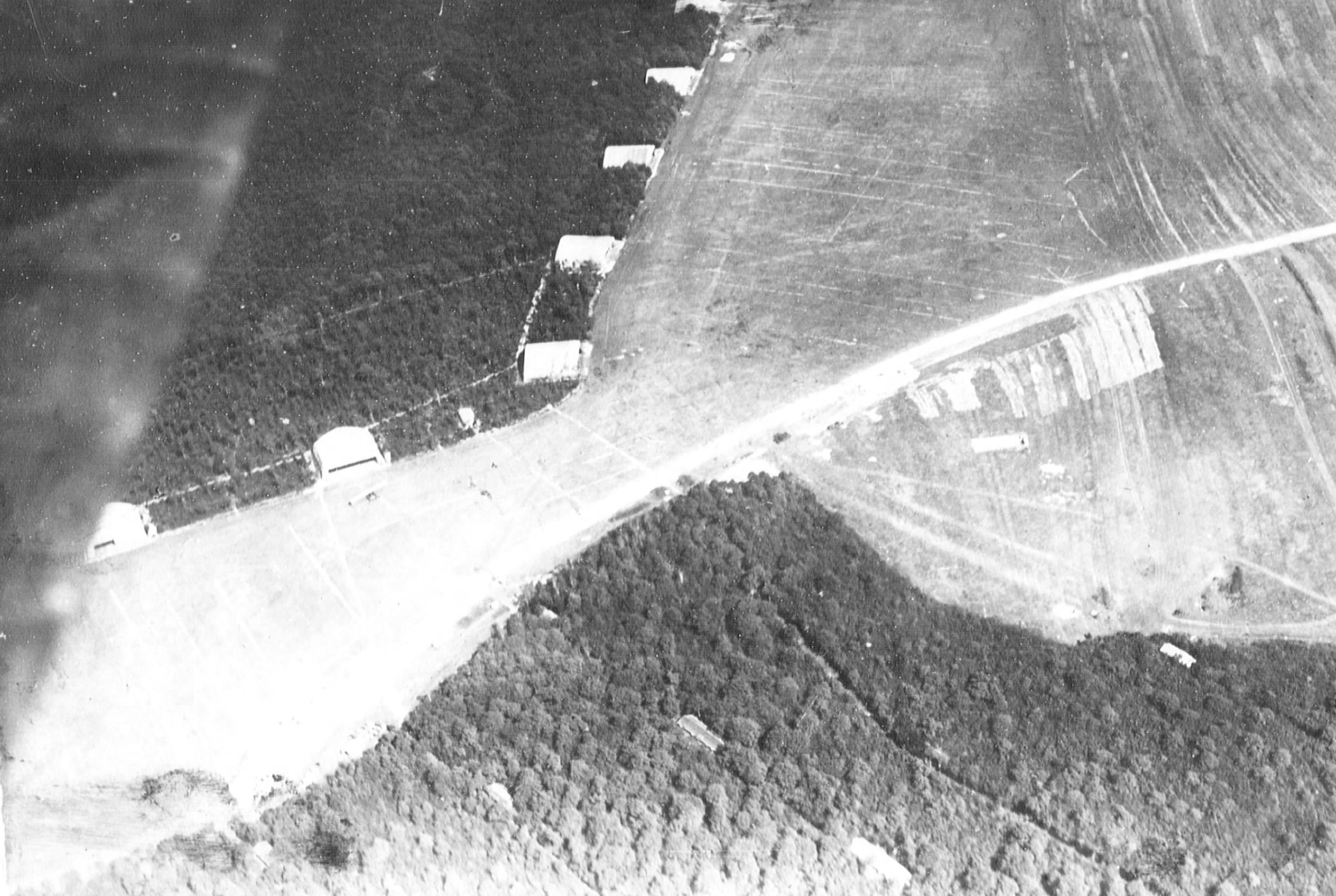
- Epiez Aerodrome, France

Site information
- Type: Combat Airfield
- Controlled by: Air Service, United States Army
- Condition: Agricultural area

Location
- Coordinates: 48°32′43″N 005°37′10″E

Site history
- Built: 1918
- In use: 1918–1919
- Battles/wars: World War I

Garrison information
- Garrison: 1st Pursuit Group; United States First Army Air Service

Épiez Aerodrome was a temporary World War I airfield in France, used by the Air Service, United States Army. It was located 0.9 miles (1.4 km) West of Épiez-sur-Meuse, in the Meuse department in Lorraine in north-eastern France, and approximately 16 miles (26 km) south-west of Toul.

== Overview ==
Epiez was built for the United States First Army Air Service in early spring 1918, and used by Aero Squadron training with the Pursuit Organization and Training Center, before joining the 1st Pursuit Group at the Croix de Metz Aerodrome, the last gone by 1 June 1918:

- 27th Aero Squadron (Pursuit, training), Nieuport 28 C.1, 24 April – 1 June 1918
- 94th Aero Squadron (Pursuit, training), Nieuport 28 C.1, 1–7 April 1918
- 95th Aero Squadron (Pursuit, training), Nieuport 28 C.1, 1 April – 4 May 1918
- 147th Aero Squadron (Pursuit, training), Nieuport 28 C.1, 22 April – 1 June 1918

104th Aero Squadron (V Corps Observation Group/First Army) then stopped here 4–8 August 1918, before the airfield was transferred to the French "Aéronautique Militaire" whose "Groupe de Bombardement no 2" was stationed at Epiez from 8 August 1918 until Summer 1919.

Today, it is a series of cultivated fields located on the north side of the Départmental 193 (D193), about one mile west of Épiez, with no indications of its wartime use.

== See also ==
- List of Air Service American Expeditionary Force aerodromes in France
