= Edward Peck Curtis =

American aviation pioneer

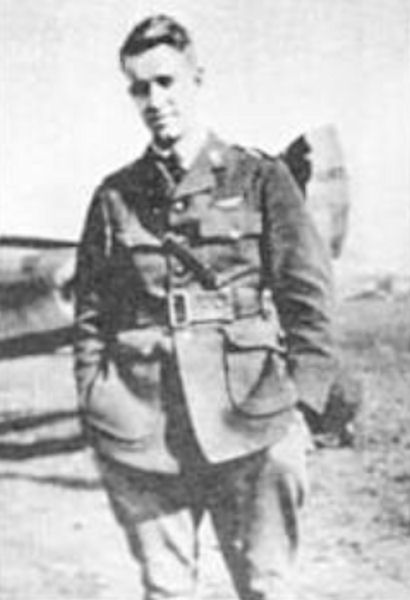
- Major Edward Peck Curtis, 95th Aero Squadron, 1918
- Born: January 14, 1897; Rochester, United States
- Died: March 13, 1987 (aged 90); Rochester, United States
- Spouse: Agnes Bartlett
- Children: 3
- Military career
- Allegiance: United States
- Branch: United States Army Air Service; United States Army Air Corps
- Rank: Major general
- Units: Air Service, United States Army; 95th Aero Squadron
- Conflicts: World War I World War II
- Awards: Distinguished Service Cross; French Legion of Honor; Legion of Merit; Robert J. Collier Trophy
- Other work: Special Assistant to the U. S. President for Aviation Facilities Planning

Edward Peck "Ted" Curtis (14 January 1897 – 13 March 1987) was an American World War I flying ace with six aerial victories. Between the world wars, he served as vice president of Eastman Kodak's international division. In World War II he served as the Chief of Staff, U. S. Strategic Air Force in Europe earning the rank of major general. As Special Assistant to President Eisenhower for Aviation Facilities Planning, he earned the 1957 Robert J. Collier Trophy.

== Biography ==
Edward Peck "Ted" Curtis was born on 14 January 1897 in Rochester, New York to Mrs. G.T. Curtis. He was a graduate of St. George's School in Rhode Island. He attended Williams College, where he was a member of the Kappa Alpha Society, before dropping out to join the American Field Service and driving an ambulance for the French Army in 1917. After the US entered the war, Curtis served with the 95th Aero Squadron becoming a flying ace by winning six aerial victories. He specifically flew the Nieuport 28. He shared his forth victory with leading ace Eddie Rickenbacker. Curtis was awarded the Distinguished Service Cross for a lone scouting flight far into enemy airspace. He flew a captured Fokker D.VII to Paris that now hangs in National Air and Space Museum. Curtis served as an aide de camp for General Billy Mitchell. He earned the rank of Major, the youngest in the army, before leaving military service for the state department.

Curtis served with the U. S. State Department in Russia after World War I. He then became an employee of Eastman Kodak Company, where he rose to become director, general manager of the international division and vice president. He retired from Kodak in 1962 after 42 years of service and remained as a Kodak board member until 1969.

In 1940, prior to World War II, Curtis joined the Army Air Corps foreseeing the coming conflict. He served with General Carl Spaatz in England and then as Chief of Staff of the Northwest African Air Forces in 1943. In 1944 in England served as Chief of Staff, U. S. Strategic Air Force in Europe earning the rank of Major General. He received the French Legion of Honor and the United States Legion of Merit for his part in the war in Africa.

In 1956–1957, he served Dwight D. Eisenhower as Special Assistant to the U. S. President for Aviation Facilities Planning. Curtis realized that separate air traffic control systems for military and civilians was impractical. He was instrumental in planning for the Federal Aviation Administration and the Federal Aviation Act of 1958. For his Aviation Facilities Planning which addressed problems with aircraft, air space, and facilities; Curtis was awarded the 1957 Robert J. Collier Trophy by the National Aeronautic Association for the greatest achievement in aeronautics or astronautics in America."

Curtis died on 13 March 1987 from pneumonia at age 90.

== See also ==
- List of World War I flying aces from the United States
