= 94th Fighter Squadron =

Unit of the US Air Force Air Combat Command

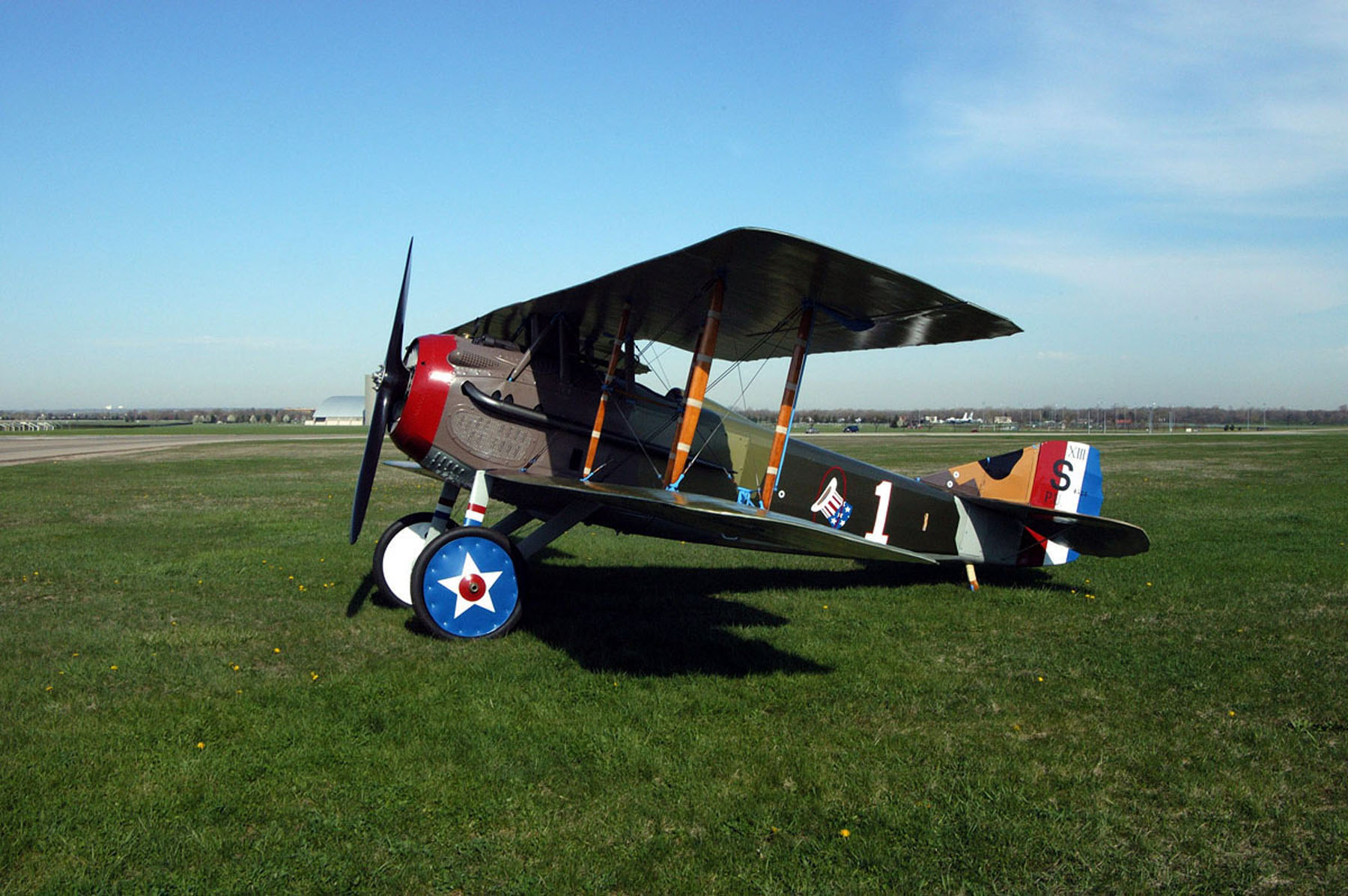
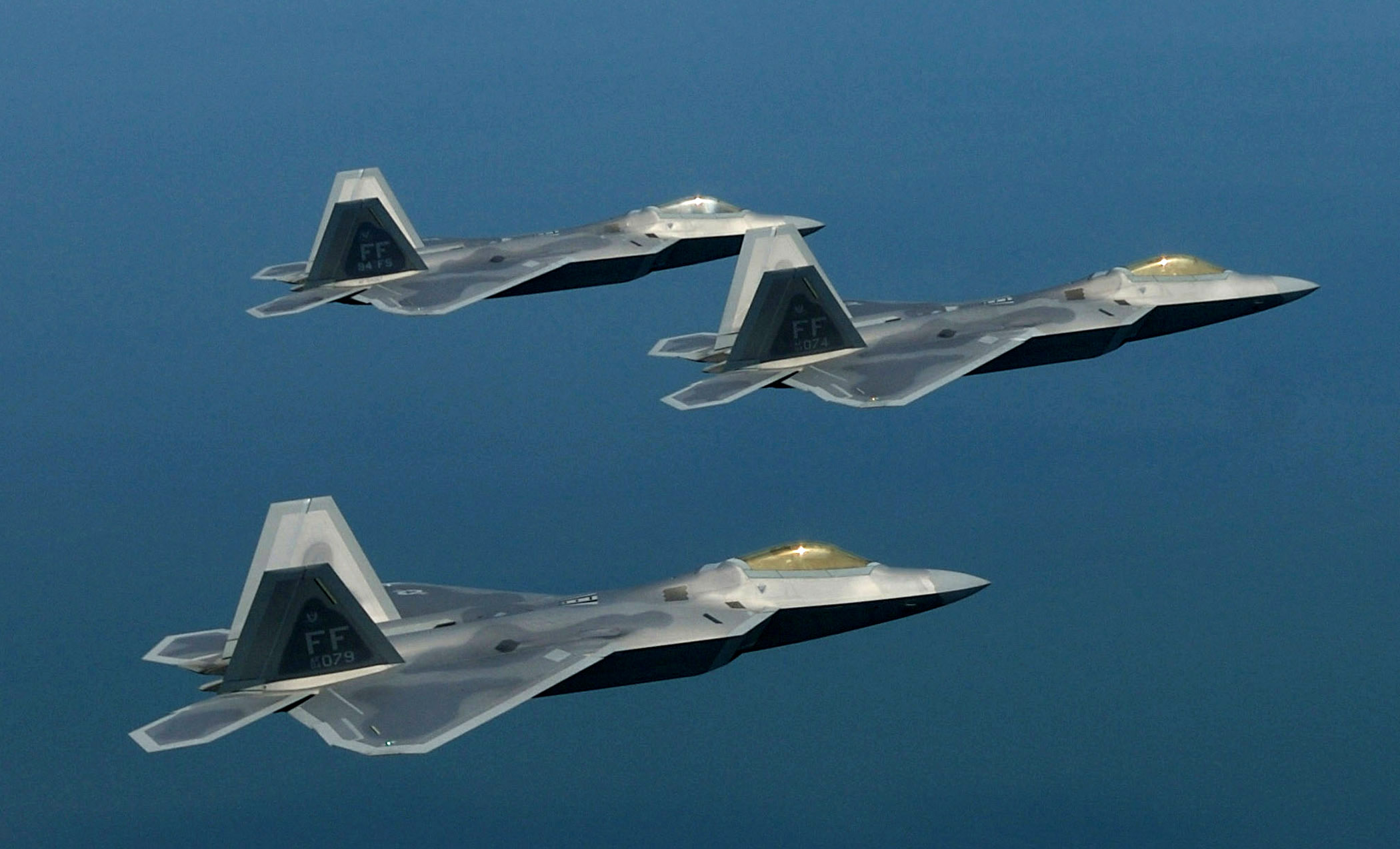
- SPAD XIII at the United States Air Force Museum shown in 94th Aero Squadron (Pursuit) markings. Aircraft is marked as Eddie Rickenbacker's aircraft. 94th Fighter Squadron F-22A Raptor formation flown on the squadron's 90th Anniversary, 17 August 2007
- Active: 1917–1945; 1946–present
- Country: United States
- Branch: United States Air Force
- Type: Squadron
- Role: Fighter
- Part of: Air Combat Command
- Garrison/HQ: Joint Base Langley–Eustis, Virginia
- Nickname: "Hat in the Ring"
- Tail Code: "FF"
- Engagements: World War I; World War II - Antisubmarine; World War II - EAME Theater; 1991 Gulf War (Defense of Saudi Arabia; Liberation of Kuwait); Operation Northern Watch Operation Southern Watch; Global War on Terrorism - Operation Noble Eagle

- Decorations: Distinguished Unit Citation (3x); Air Force Outstanding Unit Award (7x); French Croix De Guerre (World War I) (2x)
- Battle honours: French Fourragere (World War I)

Commanders
- Notable commanders: Paul V. Hester; Earle E. Partridge; Eddie Rickenbacker; Ennis Whitehead

Insignia
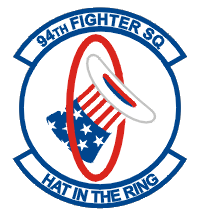
- 94th Fighter Squadron emblem (Note: Placement of the emblem on a white disc and approval of the motto was done in 1994.)

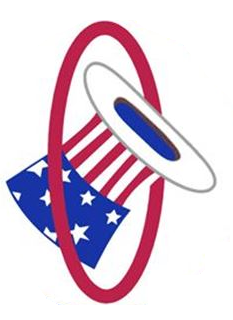
- 94th Aero Squadron emblem (Note: This emblem was approved for the 94th Aero Squadron by the American Expeditionary Force on 18 November 1918."World War I Aero Squadrons". Cross and Cockade Journal. 5 (3). Society of World War I Aero Historians. 1964. It was approved by the Air Service on 15 November 1919, but approval was revoked on 6 May 1924. Eddie Rickenbacker, former squadron commander, had formed the Rickenbacker Motor Company and had trademarked the emblem, making it unavailable for use by the squadron. By the beginning of World War II, the car company had gone out of business and Rickenbacker cancelled the trademark. The emblem was reinstated on 9 July 1942. Maurer, Combat Squadrons, p. 318.)

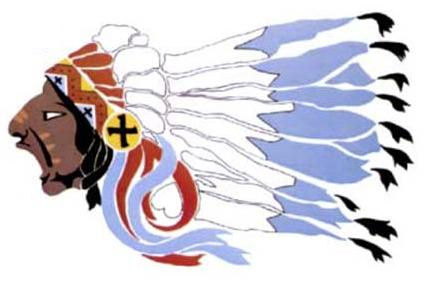
- 94th Pursuit Squadron emblem (Note: This emblem was approved for the 103d Aero Squadron by the American Expeditionary Force on 18 November 1918. "World War I Aero Squadrons". Cross and Cockade Journal. 5 (3). Society of World War I Aero Historians. 1964. When approval of the Hat in the Ring emblem was revoked in 1924, the 94th Pursuit Squadron used the former 103d Aero Squadron emblem, first on a white disc, then on a white arrowhead, until 1942.)

The 94th Fighter Squadron is a unit of the United States Air Force 1st Operations Group located at Joint Base Langley–Eustis, Virginia. The 94th is equipped with the F-22 Raptor.

The 94 FS is one of the oldest units in the United States Air Force, first being organized on 20 August 1917 as the 94th Aero Squadron of the United States Army Air Service at Kelly Field, Texas. The squadron deployed to France and fought on the Western Front during World War I as a pursuit squadron. It took part in the Champagne-Marne defensive; Aisne-Marne offensive; St. Mihiel offensive, and Meuse–Argonne offensive.

In 1924, it was consolidated with the 103d Aero Squadron (Pursuit). The 103d was largely composed of former members of the French Air Service Lafayette Escadrille (from the French Escadrille de Lafayette). This was a squadron of American volunteer pilots who had joined the French Air Service prior to the United States entry into the war on 6 April 1917. In July 1926, with the disestablishment of the U.S. Army Air Service, the squadron became part of the U.S. Army Air Corps (USAAC).

In June 1941, the squadron became part of the renamed U.S. Army Air Forces (USAAF). During World War II the unit served in the Mediterranean Theater of Operations (MTO) as part of Twelfth Air Force as a P-38 Lightning fighter squadron, participating in the North African and Italian campaigns. In September 1947, it became part of the newly established United States Air Force (USAF). During the Cold War it was both an Air Defense Command (ADC) fighter-interceptor squadron, and later as part of Tactical Air Command (TAC). It was one of the first USAF operational squadrons equipped with the F-15A Eagle in January 1976. With the disestablishment of TAC in 1992, it was assigned to the newly established Air Combat Command (ACC).

== Overview ==
The 94 Fighter Squadron (94 FS) is tasked to provide air superiority for the United States and allied forces by engaging and destroying enemy forces, equipment, defenses or installations for global deployment as part of the 1st Fighter Wing.

The squadron flies one of today's most advanced air dominance fighters, the F-22A Raptor, being the USAF's second operational F-22 squadron in 2006. 94 FS aircraft, like other aircraft from the 1st Fighter Wing, have the tail code "FF".

== History ==
The 94th Fighter Squadron has a long history and traditions that date back to World War I. The squadron was activated at Kelly Field, Texas, on 20 August 1917 as the 94th Aero Squadron. On 8 April 1924, the unit was consolidated with the 103d Aero Squadron which was organized on 31 August 1917.

=== World War I ===
See 94th Aero Squadron for an expanded World War I history

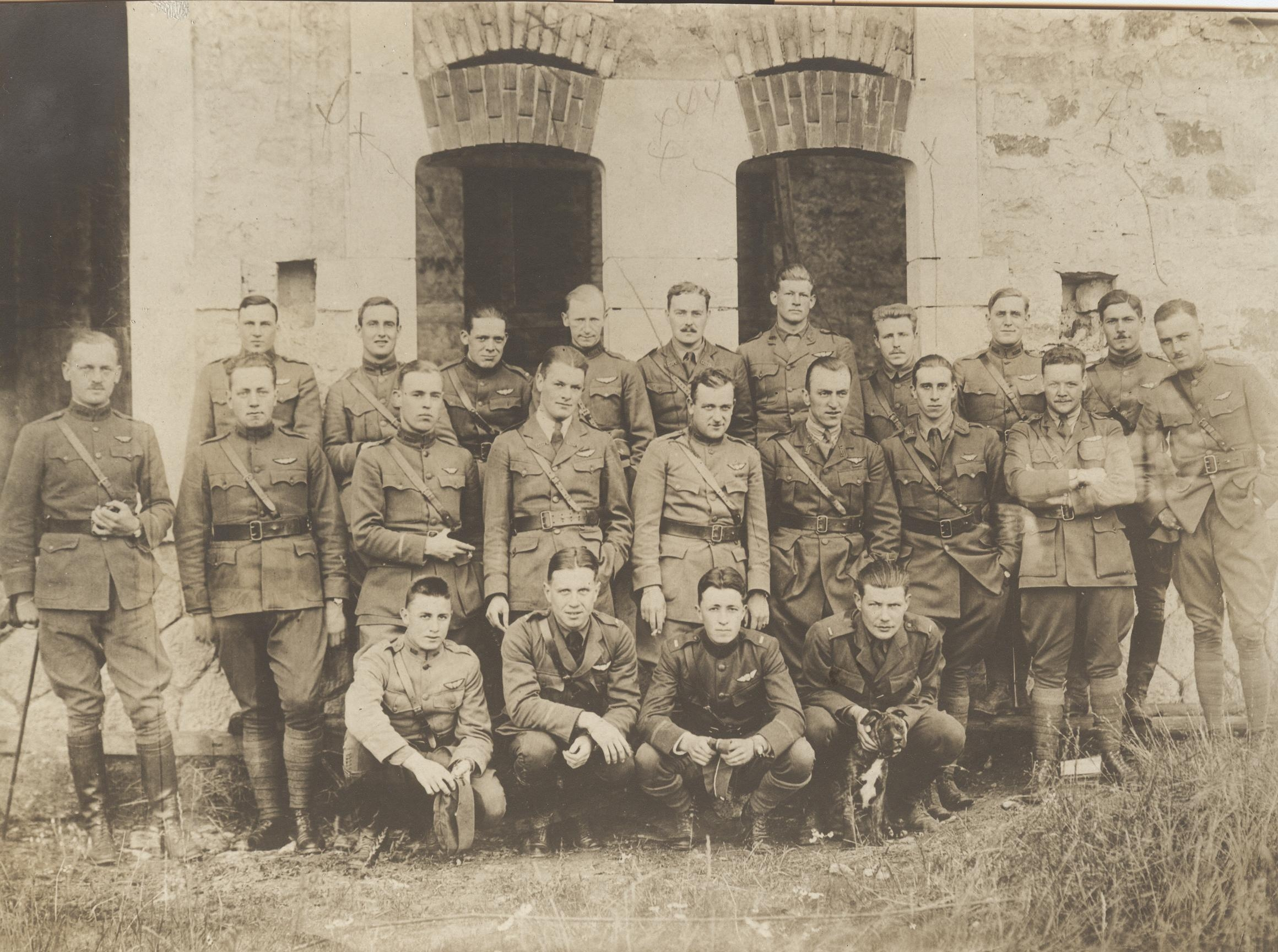
Air Service Pilots of the 94th Aero (Pursuit) Squadron in France, June 1918. Of this group, two were killed in action and Captain Edward V. "Eddie" Rickenbacker (center row, 6th from the left) became America's leading ace with 26 aerial victories.

On 30 September 1917, two officers and 150 enlisted men left Texas for France and were sent to seven different aircraft factories for maintenance and repair training. In April 1918, the 94th was reunited and stationed at the Gengault Aerodrome near Toul, France, where it began operations as the first American squadron at the front. It was placed under the command of Major Raoul Lufbery, an ace pilot and veteran of the Lafayette Escadrille.

As the first American squadron in operation, its aviators were allowed to create their squadron insignia. They used the opportunity to commemorate the United States' entry into World War I by taking the phrase of tossing one's "hat in the ring" (a boxing phrase to signify one's willingness to become a challenger) and symbolizing it with the literal image of Uncle Sam's red, white and blue top hat going through a ring.

On 14 April, Lt. Douglas Campbell and Lt. Alan Winslow downed two German aircraft. These were the first victories ever scored by an American unit. No 94th pilot achieved more aerial victories than 1st Lt. Edward V. "Eddie" Rickenbacker, who was named America's "Ace of Aces" during the war. In his Nieuport 28 and later his SPAD S.XIII, Rickenbacker was credited with 26 of the squadron's 70 kills during World War I. By the end of hostilities, the 94th had won battle honors for participation in 11 major engagements and was awarded the Croix de Guerre with Palm.

The squadron was assigned to the 1st Pursuit Group based at Toul (5 May 1918), and subsequently at Touquin (28 June 1918), Saints (9 July 1918) and Rembercourt (1 September 1918). Rickenbacker took command of the squadron on 25 September, at the start of the Meuse Argonne Offensive, and retained it through the end of the war. Another flying ace of this squadron was Harvey Weir Cook.

The 103d Aero Squadron constructed facilities, December 1917 – 1 February 1918; with flight echelon originally composed of former members of the Lafayette Escadrille, participated in combat as a pursuit unit with the French Fourth Army, French Sixth Army, Detachment of the Armies of the North (French), French Eighth Army, and the American First Army, 18 February – 10 November 1918.

On 8 April 1924, the 103d was consolidated by the Air Service with the 94th Pursuit Squadron.

=== Between the wars: 1920s and 1930s ===
The squadron returned home in the spring of 1919, and after several moves, the 94th settled with the 1st Pursuit Group at Selfridge Field, Michigan, in July 1922. In 1923, the unit was re-designated the 94th Pursuit Squadron. The squadron stayed in Michigan for the remainder of the inter-war years, training in its pursuit role. The squadron flew 17 different aircraft during this period, culminating with the P-38 Lightning. One week after Pearl Harbor, the 94th moved to Naval Air Station San Diego, California. Expecting to see action in the Pacific, the squadron instead received orders for Europe. In the summer of 1942, the 94th and its parent group deployed under its own power to England, the U.K., via Canada, Labrador, Greenland, and Iceland as part of Operation Bolero. This marked the first time that a fighter squadron flew its own aircraft from the United States to Europe.

=== World War II ===
In May 1942, all pursuit groups and squadrons were re-designated "fighter". In November the 94th Fighter Squadron entered combat in North Africa during Operation Torch. Based in Algeria, Tunisia, and Italy, the 94th again distinguished itself in combat by winning two Presidential Distinguished Unit Citations as part of the 1st Group. In addition, the squadron earned 14 Campaign honors, participating in almost every campaign in North Africa and Europe. 64 pilots of the 94th Fighter Squadron were credited with 124 Axis aircraft destroyed. The 94th produced a total of six aces in World War II. In April 1945 the 1st Fighter Group received two YP-80 jets for operational testing. The 94th Squadron's Major Edward LaClare flew two operational sorties in the YP-80 although without encountering combat.

=== Cold War ===
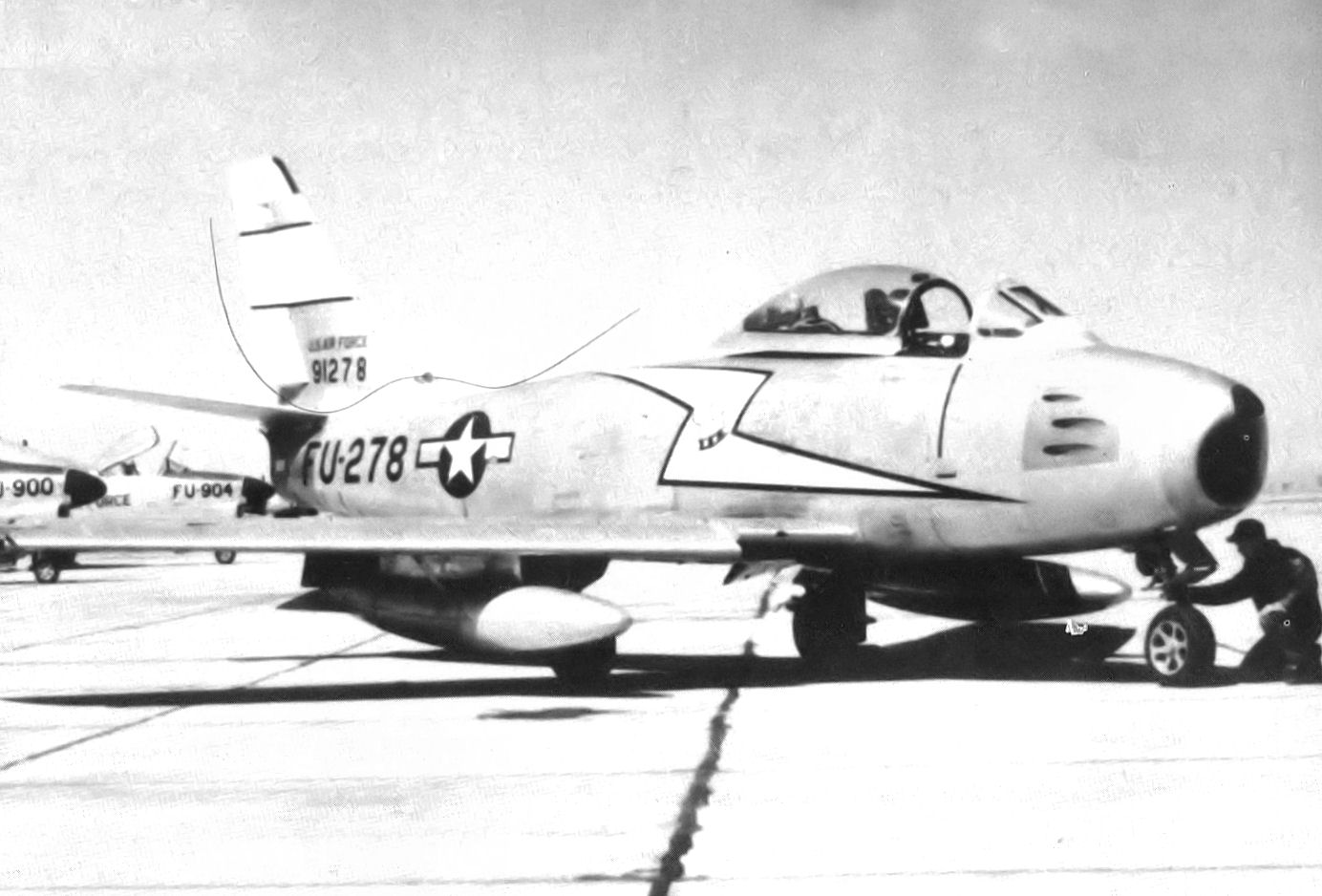
North American F-86A-5-NA Sabre, AF Ser. No. 49-1278, March AFB, California, 1950

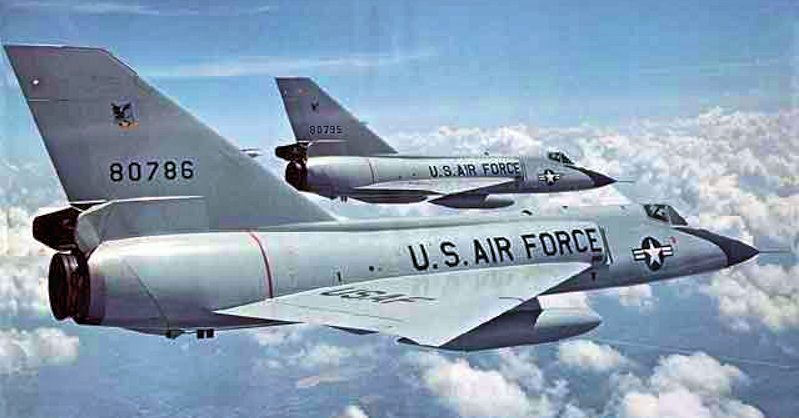
94th Fighter-Interceptor Squadron F-106A, AF Ser. No. 58-0786, Selfridge AFB, Michigan

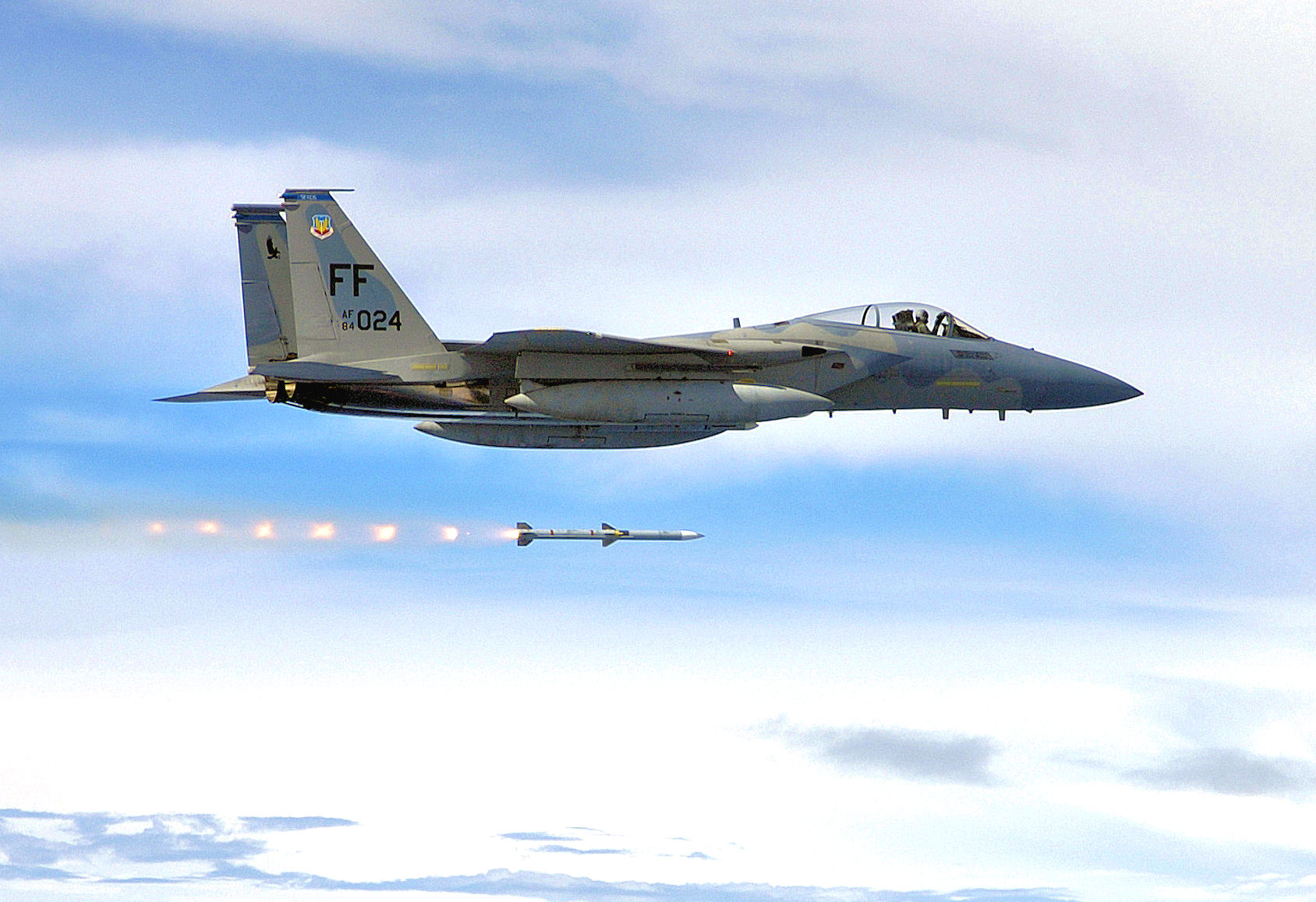
94th Fighter Squadron F-15C launches an AIM-120 Advanced Medium Range Air-to-Air Missile (AMRAAM)

After the end of World War II, the 94th trained in the Lockheed P-80 Shooting Star, America's first operational jet fighter, and was stationed at March AFB, California. In July 1950, the group became the 94th Fighter Interceptor Squadron (FIS) and was eventually assigned to Air Defense Command (ADC), later renamed Aerospace Defense Command (ADC). After the P-80, the squadron flew several aircraft in the interceptor role, including the F-86, F-102 and F-106. In 1956, the 94th won the Worldwide Rocket Firing Meet held at Vincent AFB, Arizona. In the 1960s, the unit was among the first ready units sent to Florida during the Cuban Missile Crisis in October 1962. The squadron carried out combat air patrol missions off the coast of Florida, setting a record for F-106 hours and sorties. During the 1960s, the 94th, along with other ADC units, maintained an alert force in Alaska.

With its supersonic F-106s, the squadron intercepted Russian bombers on missions over the Bering Sea. Then, in June 1969, with tensions mounting following the Pueblo Incident and the downing of an EC-121 electronic observation plane by North Korea, the squadron deployed to Osan AB, South Korea, for six months. It then replaced the 75th FIS at Wurtsmith AFB, Michigan until 1 July 1971. At that time, the squadron was redesignated the 94th Tactical Fighter Squadron, reassigned to Tactical Air Command, and reunited with the 27th and 71st Squadrons under the 1st Tactical Fighter Wing (1 TFW), flying the F-4E. The 94th assumed the duties of a Replacement Training Unit (RTU), providing F-4 aircrews for operational combat squadrons.

In 1975, the 1st TFW moved to Langley AFB, Virginia, and began the 94 TFS flying the F-15A and F-15B Eagle, with the squadron becoming combat-ready in early 1977. In September 1992, the squadron was renamed the 94th Fighter Squadron (94 FS).

The 94th Fighter Squadron did not deploy to Southwest Asia for the first Persian Gulf War, although many of its pilots and maintenance personnel did as augmenters to both the 71st and 27th Fighter Squadrons from the 1st Fighter Wing. The 94th successfully supported the UN-sanctioned Operation Southern Watch and Operation Northern Watch in Iraq with many deployments to Saudi Arabia and Turkey in the period leading up to the Iraq War. The 94th Fighter Squadron pilots repeatedly defeated Iraqi surface-to-air missiles (SAMs) and anti-aircraft artillery (AAA) attacks while enforcing UN sanctions, without loss or damage to a single aircraft.

Since the September 11 attacks on the United States, the aircraft of the 94th have patrolled the skies of the East Coast of the United States.

=== Modern era ===
In 2006, the 94th became the second operational squadron to fly the F-22 Raptor, receiving its first F-22A in June 2006, and receiving its full complement of F-22As, with AF Ser. No / tail number (T/N) 05-0094, in June 2007. This was due to the 94 FS trading tail number 086 for 094 with the 90th Fighter Squadron, which is part of the 3rd Wing based at Elmendorf AFB, Alaska.

Additionally, the 1st FW traded AF Ser. No. / tail number 05-0084 to the 90th Fighter Squadron for tail number 05-0101. Tail 10-194 is the current flagship of 94th Fighter Squadron.

==== 2013 Sequestration ====
Air Combat Command officials announced a stand down and reallocation of flying hours for the rest of the fiscal year 2013 due to mandatory budget cuts. The across-the board spending cuts, called sequestration, took effect 1 March when Congress failed to agree on a deficit-reduction plan.

Squadrons either stood down on a rotating basis or kept combat ready or at a reduced readiness level called "basic mission capable" for part or all of the remaining months in fiscal 2013. This affected the 94th Fighter Squadron with a stand-down grounding from 9 April-30 September 2013.

==== 2020's ====
In June 2025, the 94th Fighter Squadron's F-22's deployed to the Middle East under orders of the Secretary of Defence in order to protect its troops and enhance the United States defensive posture in the region.

== Lineage ==
103d Aero Squadron

- Organized as the 103d Aero Squadron on 31 August 1917

Redesignated 103d Aero Squadron (Pursuit) on 13 February 1918
Redesignated 103d Aero Squadron, 4 March 1919
Demobilized on 18 August 1919
Reconstituted on 8 April 1924 and consolidated with the 94th Pursuit Squadron as the 94th Pursuit Squadron

94th Fighter Squadron

- Organized as the 94th Aero Squadron on 20 August 1917

Redesignated 94th Aero Squadron (Pursuit) on 30 March 1918
Redesignated 94th Aero Squadron on 1 June 1919
Redesignated 94th Squadron (Pursuit) on 14 March 1921
Redesignated 94th Pursuit Squadron on 25 January 1923
Consolidated with the 103d Aero Squadron on 8 April 1924
Redesignated 94th Pursuit Squadron (Interceptor) on 6 December 1939
Redesignated 94th Pursuit Squadron (Fighter) on 12 March 1941
Redesignated 94th Fighter Squadron (Twin Engine) on 15 May 1942
Redesignated 94th Fighter Squadron, Two Engine on 28 February 1944
Inactivated on 16 October 1945

- Redesignated 94th Fighter Squadron, Single Engine on 5 April 1946

Redesignated 94th Fighter Squadron, Jet Propelled on 20 June 1946
Activated on 3 July 1946
Redesignated 94th Fighter Squadron, Jet on 15 June 1948
Redesignated 94th Fighter-Interceptor Squadron on 16 April 1950
Redesignated 94th Tactical Fighter Squadron on 1 July 1971
Redesignated 94th Fighter Squadron on 1 November 1991

=== Assignments ===
103d Aero Squadron

- Post Headquarters, Kelly Field, 31 August 1917
- Aviation Concentration Center, 5 November 1917
- Third Aviation Instruction Center, 28 December 1917
- Air Service Headquarters, American Expeditionary Force, 13 February 1918 (attached to Groupe de Combat 21 18 February 1918, Sixth Army (France) 11 April 1918, Army of the North (France) after 30 April 1918)
- 2d Pursuit Group, 5 July 1918
- 3d Pursuit Group, 7 August 1918
- 1st Air Depot, 5 June 1919
- Advanced Section Services of Supply, 6–19 February 1919
- Eastern Department, 4 March-18 Aug 1919

94th Aero (later, 94th Pursuit) Squadron

- Post Headquarters, Kelly Field, 20 August 1917
- Aviation Concentration Center, 5 October 1917

Overseas transport: RMS Adriatic, 27 October-10 November 1917

- Headquarters Air Service, AEF, 12 November 1917

Attached to French Air Service for training, 19 November 1917 – 24 January 1918

- 3d Instructional Center, 24 January 1918
- 1st Pursuit Organization Center, 30 March 1918
- 1st Pursuit Group, 5 May 1918
- 5th Pursuit Group, 20 November 1918
- 1st Air Depot, 17 April 1919
- Advanced Section Services of Supply, 5 May 1919
- Post Headquarters, Mitchel Field, 1 June 1919
- 1st Pursuit Group, 22 August 1919 to consolidation.

Consolidated Squadron

- 1st Pursuit (later, 1st Fighter) Group, from consolidation in 1924 to 16 October 1945
- 1st Fighter (later, 1st Fighter-Interceptor) Group, 3 July 1946

Attached to Alaskan Air Command, 13 October 1947 – 16 February 1948

- 4705th Defense Wing, 6 February 1952
- 27th Air Division, 1 March 1952
- 1st Fighter Group, 18 August 1955
- 1st Fighter Wing, 1 February 1961

Attached to 314th Air Division, c. 6 June – 17 November 1969

- 23d Air Division, 1 December 1969
- 1st Tactical Fighter Wing, 1 July 1971
- 1st Operations Group, 1 October 1991–present

=== Stations ===
103d Aero Squadron

- Kelly Field, Texas, 31 August-30 October 1917
- Aviation Concentration Center, Garden City, New York, 5 November 1917

Overseas transport: RMS Baltic, 23 November-7 December

- Liverpool, England, 8 December
- Windall Downs Rest Camp, Winchester, England, 8 December
- Southampton, England, 23 December
- American Rest Camp, Le Havre, France, 24 December
- Issoudun Aerodrome, France, 28 December
- La Noblette Aerodrome, France, 13 Feb 1918
- Bonne Maison Aerodrome, France, 8 April 1918
- Leffrinckouke Aerodrome, France, 30 April 1918
- Crochte Aerodrome, France, 6 June 1918
- Gengault Aerodrome (Toul), France, 30 June 1918
- Vaucouleurs Aerodrome, France, 7 August 1918
- Lisle-en-Barrois Aerodrome, France, 20 September 1918
- Foucaucourt Aerodrome, France, 6 November 1918
- Colombey-les-Belles Airdrome, France, 5 Jun 1919
- Brest, France, 6-19 Feb 1919
- Garden City, New York, 4-18 Mar 1919
- Undetermined, 19 March-18 Aug 1919

94th Aero (later, 94th Pursuit) Squadron

- Kelly Field, Texas, 20 August 1917
- Aviation Concentration Center, Garden City, New York, 5–27 October 1917
- Liverpool, England, 10 November 1917
- British Rest Camp #2, Le Havre, France, 11 November 1917
- Reuilly Barracks, Paris, France, 18 November 1917

Squadron divided into flights and sent to several locations in France for training

- Issoudun Aerodrome, France, 24 January 1918
- Epiez Aerodrome, France, 1 April 1918
- Gengault Aerodrome, Toul, France, 7 April 1918
- Touquin Aerodrome, France, 29 June 1918
- Saints Aerodrome, France, 9 July 1918
- Rembercourt Aerodrome, France, 30 August 1918
- Noers Aerodrome, Longuyon, France, 20 Nov 1918
- Coblenz Aerodrome, Germany, 31 Dec 1918
- Colombey-les-Belles Airdrome, France, 17 Apr 1919
- Le Mans, France, 5–18 May 1919
- Mitchel Field, New York, 1 Jun 1919
- Selfridge Field, Michigan, 27 June 1919
- Kelly Field, Texas, c. 31 August 1919
- Ellington Field, Texas, 1 July 1921
- Selfridge Field, Michigan, 1 July 1922 to consolidation.

Consolidated Squadron

- Selfridge Field, Michigan, from consolidation in 1924
- San Diego Naval Air Station, California, 9 December 1941
- Long Beach Army Air Field, California, 6 February – 20 May 1942
- RAF Kirton in Lindsey, England, 10 June 1942
- RAF Ibsley, England, 27 August – 24 October 1942
- Tafaraoui Airfield, Algeria, 15 November 1942
- Nouvion Airfield, Algeria, 21 November 1942
- Youks-les-Bains Airfield, Algeria, 28 November 1942

Detachments operated from Maison Blanche Airport, Algeria, 6–14 December 1942

- Biskra Airfield, Algeria, 14 December 1942
- Chateaudun-du-Rhumel Airfield, Algeria, 14 February 1943
- Mateur Airfield, Tunisia, c. 20 June 1943

Detachments operated from: Dittaino, Sicily, 6–18 September 1943
Detachments operated from: Gambut, Libya, 4–12 October 1943

- Djedeida Airfield, Tunisia, c. 1 November 1943
- Monserrato, Sardinia, 29 November 1943
- Gioia del Colle Airfield, Italy, c. 10 December 1943
- Salsola Airfield, Italy, January 1944

Detachments operated from: Aghione, Corsica, 10–18 August 1944
Detachments operated from: Vincenzo Airfield, Italy, 9 January – 18 February 1945

- Lesina Airfield, Italy, 16 March 1945
- Marcianise, Italy, 26 September – 16 October 1945
- March Field (later, AFB), California, 3 July 1946

Deployed at Ladd Field, Alaska, 13 October 1947 – 16 February 1948

- George AFB, California, 18 July 1950
- Selfridge AFB, Michigan, 18 August 1955

Deployed at Osan AB, South Korea, c. 6 June – 17 November 1969

- Wurtsmith AFB, Michigan, 31 December 1969
- MacDill AFB, Florida, 1 July 1971
- Langley AFB, Virginia, 30 June 1975–present

=== Aircraft ===
103d Aero Squadron

- Spad VII, 1918
- Spad XIII, 1918

94th Aero (later, 94th Pursuit) Squadron

- Nieuport 28, 1918
- Spad XIII, 1918-1919
- Fokker D.VII, Albatros D.V, Pfalz D.III, and Roland D.VI, during 1919
- Royal Aircraft Factory S.E.5, 1919–1922
- Curtiss JN-4, JN-6, Airco DH.4, Orenco D, and PW-5, during the period 1919 to consolidation in 1924
- Thomas-Morse MB-3, 1922 to consolidation in 1924

Consolidated Squadron

- Thomas-Morse MB-3, from consolidation in 1924 to 1925
- PW-8, 1924–1926
- P-1 Hawk, 1925–1931
- P-2 Hawk, P-3 Hawk, and P-5 Hawk, 1926–1931
- Boeing P-12, 1930–1932
- P-6 Hawk, 1932
- Berliner-Joyce P-16, 1932–1934
- P-6 Hawk, P-26 Peashooter, and Consolidated P-30 (PB-2), 1934–1938
- Seversky P-35, 1934–1941
- P-36 Hawk, 1938–1940
- P-40 Warhawk (and probably P-43 Lancer), 1939–1941
- P-38 Lightning, 1941–1945
- P-80 Shooting Star, 1946–1949
- F-86D Sabre Interceptor, 1949–1960
- F-106 Delta Dart, 1960–1971
- F-4 Phantom II, 1971–1975
- F-15 Eagle, 1976–2005
- F-22A Raptor, 2006–present

== See also ==
- Barber pole#Aviation and space flight for insignia on aircraft.
- Hamilton Coolidge
- Reed Chambers
- David M. Peterson
- Raoul Lufbery
- James Meissner
- Eddie Rickenbacker
- List of American Aero Squadrons
- List of World War I flying aces
- Lafayette Flying Corps
