= Samuel Kaye =

First World War American pilot

Samuel Kaye Jr. (8 November 1895 – 12 March 1939) was an officer in the United States Army Air Service during the Great War. He scored four victories and three probables while flying with the 94th Aero Squadron.

== Service ==
Kaye enlisted in the United States Army Air Service at the start of the Great War. He was sent to the Aviation Field School at Austin, Texas, and then to flight training at Chanute Field in Illinois. He was ordered to Europe and arrived in England in November 1917.

Kaye's first assignment was as a ferry pilot flying between Paris and London. Then, on 9 July 1918, he was assigned to the 94th Aero Squadron, 1st Pursuit Group, at Saints Aerodrome, Saints, France. The 94th was known as the "Hat in the Ring" Squadron and was under the command of Captain Eddie Rickenbacker.

Kaye was awarded his first Distinguished Service Cross for action over the region of Epinonville, France, on Sept. 29, 1918. Lieutenants Kaye and Reed Chambers attacked a formation of 6 German planes shooting down one and forcing the others to retire back to German lines.

The citation for Kaye's second Distinguish Service Cross reads:

”The President of the United States of America, authorized by Act of Congress, July 9, 1918, takes pleasure in presenting a Bronze Oak Leaf Cluster in lieu of a Second Award of the Distinguished Service Cross to First Lieutenant (Air Service) Samuel Kaye, Jr., United States Army Air Service, for extraordinary heroism in action while serving with 94th Aero Squadron, 1st Pursuit Group, U.S. Army Air Service, A.E.F., over the region of Montfaucon and Bantheville, France, 5 October 1918. Lieutenant Kaye encountered a formation of seven enemy machines (Fokker type). Regardless of their numerical superiority, he immediately attacked and by skillful maneuvering succeeded in separating one enemy plane from its formation and after a short combat shot it down in flames.”

Kaye was credited with four confirmed German Fokkers shot down and three probables. He was promoted to captain and served as the commander of the 94th Squadron's 1st Flight.

Kaye’s four credited victories came on 29 September 1918, 5 October 1918, 18 October 1918, and 29 October 1918. He held the rank of 1st Lieutenant during each of these.

In the action of 5 October, Kaye and fellow squadron mate 1st Lt. John N. Jeffers each downed a Fokker D-VII, which was witnessed from the ground by C.O. Rickenbacker and Chambers, who were returning to Rembercourt after retrieving a German Hanover that had been downed intact at Montfaucon on 3 October.

Kaye flew SPAD S.XIII, serial S15130.

The Armistice went into effect on 11 November 1918. Kaye was promoted to Captain by 18 November 1918.

On 23 December 1918, Kaye was awarded Distinguished Service Cross 2nd Oak Leaf Cluster for action at Epinonville on 29 September and Montfaucon on 5 October.

== Post-War ==
Kaye returned to Columbus, Mississippi, on 15 June 1919.

Aerial Age Weekly reported on 12 April 1920 that Kaye had been awarded the Croix de Guerre with Bronze Star.

Sam Kaye continued to live in Columbus after his return from France and operated The Columbus Auto Co. which was the local Ford dealership.

== Death ==
Kaye died 12 March 1939 after an extended illness. Unable to attend the funeral because of a business commitment, Eddie Rickenbacker sent a huge floral arrangement forming the insignia of the Hat in the Ring Squadron.

== Commemoration ==
On 6 August 1941, a newly established United States Army Air Force training base, established at Columbus, Mississippi, was designated an Air Corps Advanced Flying School. On 15 September 1941, it became known as Columbus Airfield.

On 24 February 1942, the War Department announced the installation would be named Kaye Field in honor of Capt. Samuel Kaye Jr., "a World War I flying ace."

The name did not last long, however. On 27 March 1942, the War Department announced that the base name had been changed from Kaye Field to Columbus Army Flying School to avoid confusion with nearby Key Field in Meridian, Mississippi.

After several more name changes, the installation became Columbus Air Force Base on 24 June 1948.

In 2007 the Auditorium at Columbus Air Force Base was named in Kaye’s honor and his uniform is displayed there.

== Family ==
Kaye’s son, John M. (Jack) Kaye, was an Army Air Force fighter pilot in the Pacific during World War II.
