= James Armand Meissner =

United States Army WWI pilot (1896–1936)

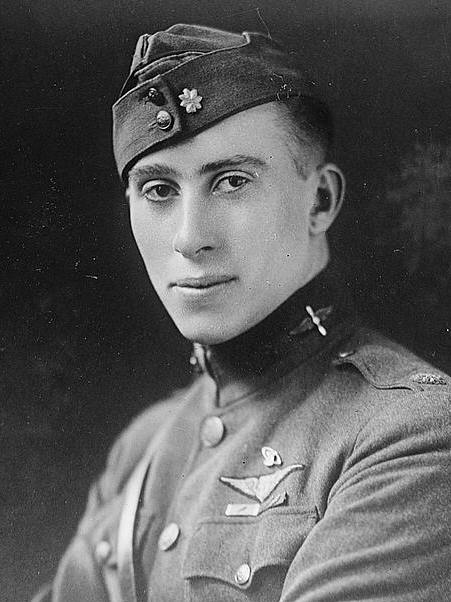
- Meissner in 1919
- Born: July 20, 1896; Londonderry, Nova Scotia, Canada
- Died: January 16, 1936 (aged 39); Birmingham, Alabama, U.S.
- Burial place: Arlington National Cemetery; Section 2, Site 4791
- Education: Cornell University (ME)
- Spouse: Elva Kessler (m. 1930)
- Military career
- Allegiance: United States
- Branch: Air Service, United States Army; Alabama National Guard
- Service years: 1917–1922
- Rank: Major
- Nickname: Jimmy
- Unit: 94th Aero Squadron
- Commands: 147th Aero Squadron
- Conflicts: World War I
- Awards: Distinguished Service Cross, French Croix de Guerre
- Other work: Commanding Officer, 135th Observation Squadron, Alabama Air National Guard

James Armand Meissner (July 20, 1896 – January 16, 1936) was a World War I flying ace credited with eight aerial victories and awarded two Distinguished Service Crosses.

== Early life and service ==
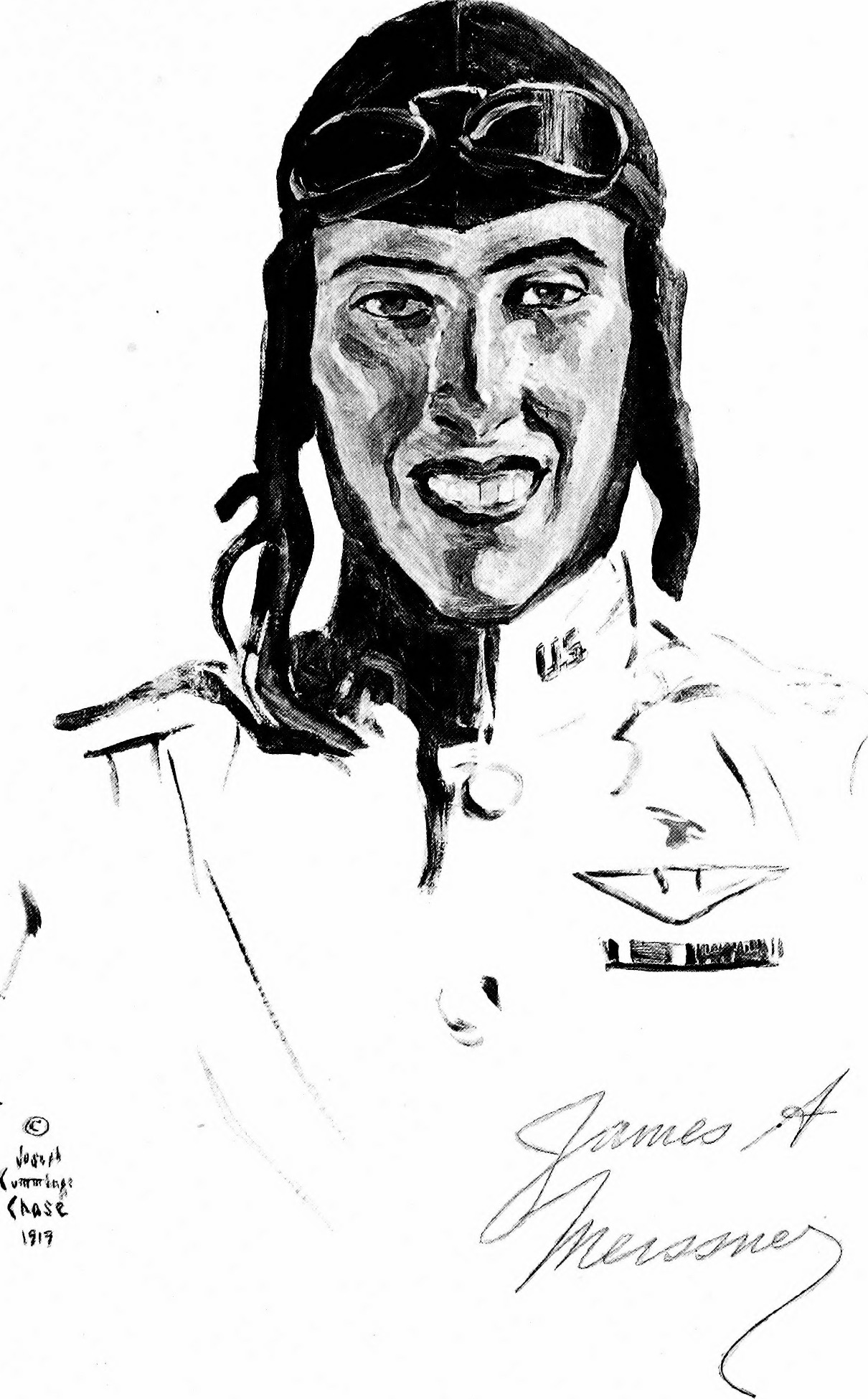
James A. Meissner sketch circa 1919

James A. Meissner was born in Londonderry, Nova Scotia, to Clara (née Ayer) and Carl A. Meissner. His father was an executive with U.S. Steel. He grew up in Brooklyn, New York and graduated from Erasmus Hall High School there in 1914. He enrolled at Cornell University College of Engineering in Ithaca, New York to study engineering. As a member of the college's corps of cadets, he enlisted in the U.S. Signal Corps as a member of the first class of the School of Military Aeronautics on 17 May 1917.

== Combat service ==
Meissner completed his aeronautic combat training in Tours and was commissioned a 1st lieutenant on 20 November 1917, after which he reported to the 94th Pursuit Squadron commanded by Major John Huffer on 8 March 1918. Among his colleagues in the unit were Eddie Rickenbacker and former members of the Lafayette Escadrille.

Piloting a French-made Nieuport 28, Meissner scored his first aerial victory over the Forêt De La Rappe on 2 May 1918; he was fortunate to survive, given the fabric was shredding off his top wing even as he scored. At any rate, the feat earned the Distinguished Service Cross and the Croix de Guerre. He shot a second plane down near Jaulny on 30 May, colliding with an Albatros fighter in the process. He then racked up two more victories—one of which he shared with Douglas Campbell—before being made commander of the 147th Pursuit Squadron in July. Now flying a SPAD S.XIII fighter, he scored four more victories, one of which was an observation balloon, and another of which was shared with Ralph O'Neill.

== List of victories ==
See also Aerial victory standards of World War I

No.	Date/time	Foe	Location	Notes
1.	2 May 1918 @ 1203 hours	Hannover CL reconnaissance plane	Regnaville	
2.	30 May 1918 @ 0755 hours	Albatros D.V fighter	East of Thiaucourt	Albatros collided with Meissner
3.	5 June 1918 @ 1030 hours	Rumpler reconnaissance plane	Louvigny	Shared with Lieutenant Donald Campbell
4.	13 June 1918 @ 0800 hours	Hannover CL reconnaissance plane	Thiaucourt	Shared victory with two other American pilots
5.	1 August 1918 @ 1830 hours	Fokker D.VII fighter	Fere-en-Tardenois	Shared with another pilot
6.	10 October 1918 @ 1615 hours	Rumpler reconnaissance plane	Bantheville	Shared with two other pilots
7.	28 October 1918 @ 1556 hours	Observation balloon	Bantheville	
8.	29 October 1918 @ 1225 hours	Rumpler reconnaissance plane	Buzancy	

== Postwar life ==
Meissner was discharged as a major on 25 March 1919 and returned to Cornell to complete a Master of Engineering degree. After receiving his diploma, Meissner moved to Birmingham, Alabama and began working at Tennessee Coal, Iron and Railroad Company's rail mill. He married Elva Kessler, daughter of William H. Kessler, a landscape architect from Augusta, Georgia, on June 20, 1930.

In 1919, he and Henry Badham (father of director John Badham) organized the Birmingham Flying Club, nicknamed the "Birmingham Escadrille" and leased a tract of land near Ensley to set up an airfield (Roberts Field). The club was recognized, with the assistance of Alabama's adjutant general Colonel Hartley A. Moon, as the 135th Observation Squadron on 21 January 1922 under Meissner's command. It was Alabama's first Air National Guard unit and the 7th in the United States. Meissner was its first commanding officer.

Meissner died from pneumonia on January 16, 1936, at his home on 27th Street in Birmingham. Rickenbacker made the trip to Birmingham to serve as pallbearer during his memorial service, which was capped by a flyover by members of his unit. He was interred at Arlington National Cemetery.

== See also ==
- List of World War I flying aces from the United States

== Bibliography ==
- "James Meissner" at The Aerodrome website – accessed March 20, 2010
- Nieuport Aces of World War 1. Franks, Norman. Osprey Publishing, 2000. ISBN 978-1-85532-961-4.
- Over the Front: The Complete Record of the Fighter Aces and Units of the United States and French Air Services, 1914–1918. Grub Street Publishing, 2008. ISBN 978-0-94881-754-0.
