= 94th Aero Squadron =

US Army Air Service unit during WWI

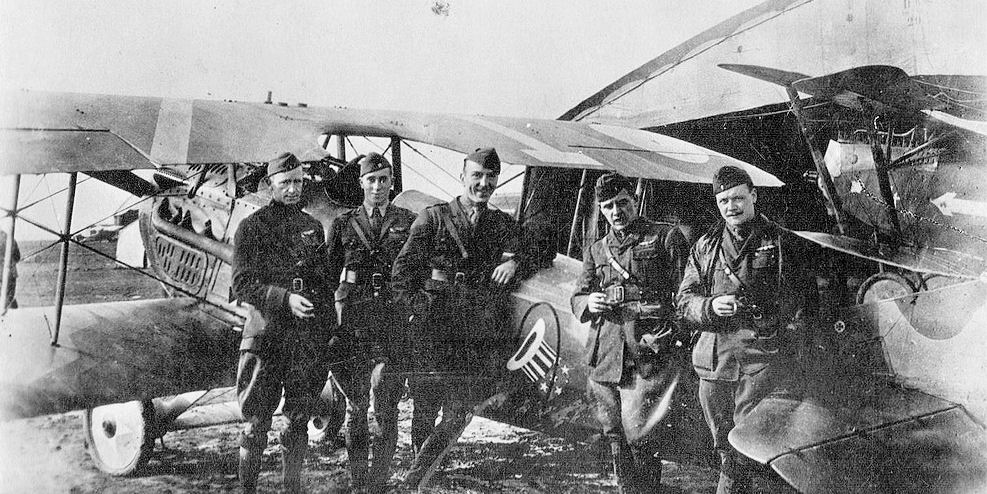
- SPAD XIII and pilots of the 94th Aero Squadron, Foucaucourt Aerodrome, France, November 1918; Identified pilots are: 1LT Reed Chambers, Capt James Meissner, 1LT Eddie Rickenbacker, 1LT TC Taylor and 1LT JH Eastman
- Active: 20 August 1917 – 14 March 1921 as the 94th Aero Squadron. See 94th Fighter Squadron for full information.
- Country: United States
- Branch: Air Service, United States Army
- Type: Squadron
- Role: Pursuit
- Part of: American Expeditionary Forces (AEF)
- Fuselage Code: "Hat in the Ring"
- Engagements: World War I

- Decorations: French Croix de Guerre with Palm

Commanders
- Notable commanders: Maj. Raoul Lufbery; Maj. John W. F. Huffer; Maj. Kenneth Marr; Capt. John Owen Donaldson; Capt.Field Eugene Kindley; Capt. Edward V. Rickenbacker; Lt. Alfred A. Grant

Insignia
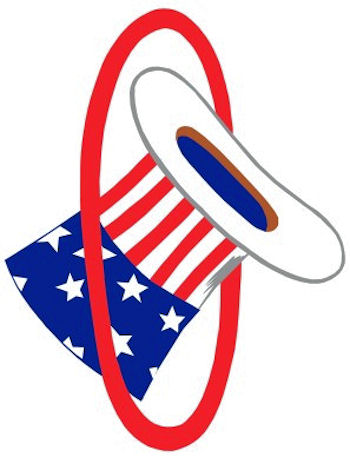
- 94th Aero Squadron Emblem

Aircraft flown
- Fighter: Nieuport 28, 1918; Spad XIII, 1918–19

Service record
- Operations: 1st Pursuit Group; Western Front, France: 9 April – 11 November 1918: Enemy combats: 296; Killed: 8; Wounded: 1; Missing: 4 (4 POW)
- Victories: Enemy Aircraft shot down: 52; Enemy Balloons shot down: 12; Total Enemy Aircraft Destroyed: 64; Air Aces: 8: Lt. Douglas Campbell, 6 (1 shared); Maj. Reed M. Chambers, 7 (1 balloon, 2 shared); Capt. Harvey W. Cook, 7 (4 balloons, 2 shared); Capt. Hamilton Coolidge, 8 (3 balloons, 3 shared); Maj. Gervais R. Lufbery, (2 probables)* *Lufbery had a total of 16 confirmed aerial victories, 3 probables, 3 of them shared. All of his confirmed victories were earned while with N.124 of the French Air Service (Lafayette Escadrille) before he joined the 94th Aero Squadron.; Capt. James A. Meissner, 4 (2 shared)** **Meissner had a total of 8 confirmed aerial victories, 4 of them shared. 4 of the victories came after he was transferred to the 147th Aero Squadron.; Maj. David M. Peterson 3*** ***Peterson had a total of 6 confirmed aerial victories, 1 of them shared. 1 victory was with N.124 of the French Air Service (Lafayette Escadrille) before joining the 94th AS, 2 after transferring to the 95th Aero Squadron.; Capt. Samuel Kaye, Jr., 4 confirmed, 3 probable.; Capt. Edward V. Rickenbacker, 26 (5 balloons, 4 shared)

The 94th Aero Squadron was a United States Army Air Service fighter squadron that fought on the Western Front during World War I. The squadron was assigned as a Day Pursuit (Fighter) Squadron as part of the 1st Pursuit Group, First United States Army. Its mission was to engage and clear enemy aircraft from the skies and provide escort to reconnaissance and bombardment squadrons over enemy territory. It also attacked enemy observation balloons and performed close air support and tactical bombing attacks of enemy forces along the front lines.

The squadron was one of the first American pursuit squadrons to reach the Western Front and see combat, becoming one of the most famous. The 94th was highly publicized in the American print media of the time, and its exploits "over there" were widely reported on the home front. Its squadron emblem, the "Hat in the Ring," became a symbol in the minds of the American public of the American Air Service of World War I. Three notable air aces served with the squadron. Eddie Rickenbacker was awarded almost every decoration attainable, including the Medal of Honor and the Distinguished Service Cross. Douglas Campbell was the first American trained pilot to become an flying ace. He shared the honor of the squadron's first official aerial victory with Alan Winslow. Another squadron member, Raoul Lufbery, attained 17 victories before leaping to his death from a fiery Nieuport 28 aircraft in May 1918.

After the 1918 Armistice with Germany, the squadron returned to the United States in June 1919 and became part of the permanent United States Army Air Service in 1921. The United States Air Force's 94th Fighter Squadron traces its lineage back to this unit.

== History ==
=== Origins ===
The 94th Aero Squadron was formed at Kelly Field, Texas on 20 August 1917. The original cadre of men was composed entirely of volunteers recruited from all parts of the United States. With the exception of two men, none had any previous military training. The men were indoctrinated into military service with drill and other basic training. On 30 September 1917, the 94th was ordered to the Aviation Concentration Center at Mineola Field, Long Island for overseas service.

The squadron entrained at Kelly Field for New York, consisting of 160 men and two officers, arriving on 5 October. At the Concentration Center, the squadron received additional equipment and was further instructed in drills and in military traditions.

=== Training in France ===
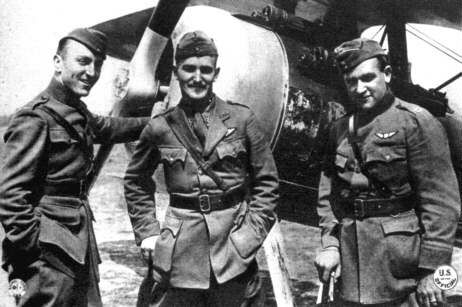
Eddie Rickenbacker, Douglas Campbell, and Kenneth Marr of the 94th Aero Squadron pose next to a Nieuport 28 fighter, 1918.

On 27 October, the squadron boarded RMS Adriatic, and after an uneventful crossing of the Atlantic, the squadron disembarked at Liverpool on 10 November 1917. The squadron moved by train to Southampton on the southern coast, reaching it at midnight that same day. The next morning it boarded the steamship Huntscroft for Le Havre, France, and took up residence at British Rest Camp No. 2. The 94th remained at Le Havre until 18 November when it boarded a troop train and arrived in Paris, France that evening. The squadron was billeted at Reuilly Barracks upon arrival.

After a brief rest period, the 94th Aero Squadron was divided up into seven flights, each flight being sent to a separate airplane or engine factory for technical training. These were Breguet, Brasler, Renault, Nieuport, Bleriot, and Hispano-Suiza. For the next two and a half months, the men underwent training at these factories. Upon completion of the training, the squadron was sent to the 3d Instructional Center, AEF, at Issoudun Aerodrome on 24 January 1918 for additional training. At Issoudun, the squadron was equipped with Nieuport 28 aircraft and was designated as a pursuit (fighter) squadron.

However, the necessities of war meant the squadron was needed in the "Zone of Advance" (the Western Front), for combat duties as soon as possible. On 5 March, it arrived at the 1st Pursuit Organization and Training Center, Villeneuve-les-Vertus Aerodrome, for advanced training, and on 30 March, the 94th was ordered to proceed to the Epiez Aerodrome to replace a French squadron which had moved to another part of the front. However, a fire broke out in one of the hangars that delayed the squadron for a day; consequently, it was not until 1 April that the 94th arrived at Epiez. A continual rain meant that flying was impossible upon arrival, however, the aircraft were hangared and readied for combat patrols. Some familiarization flights were flown from Epiez, before the 94th Aero Squadron was ordered to proceed to Croix de Metz Aerodrome, near Toul in the new American Sector of the line on 7 April. The squadron was assigned to work with the Eighth French Army. It was the first trained and organized American pursuit squadron to be stationed at the front and see active combat service.

=== Combat on the Western Front ===
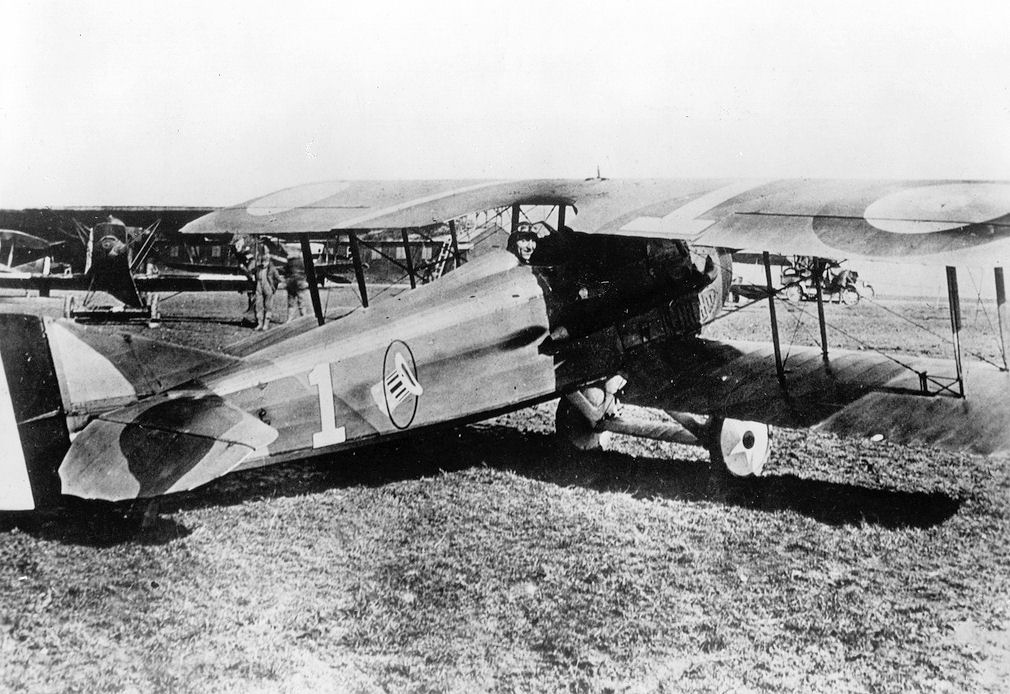
94th Aero Squadron – SPAD XIII

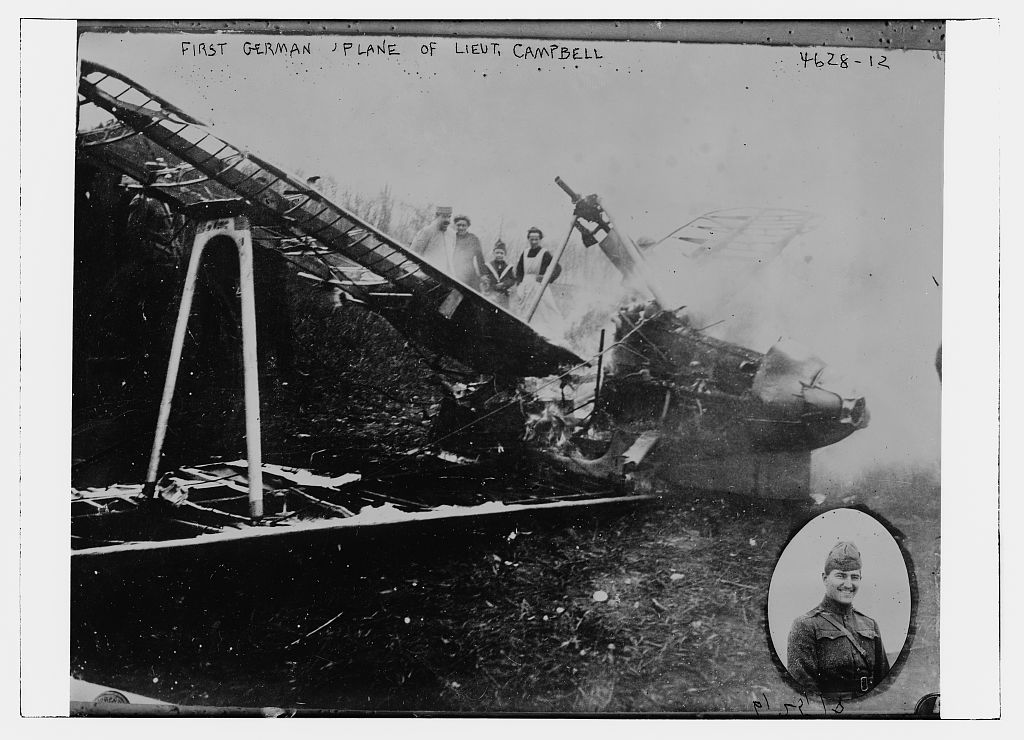
Plane shot down by Lt Campbell

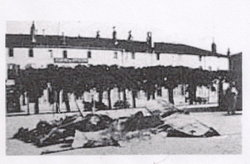
Plane shot down by Lt Douglas Campbell 94th Aero Squadron 14 April 1918 {USAF museum)

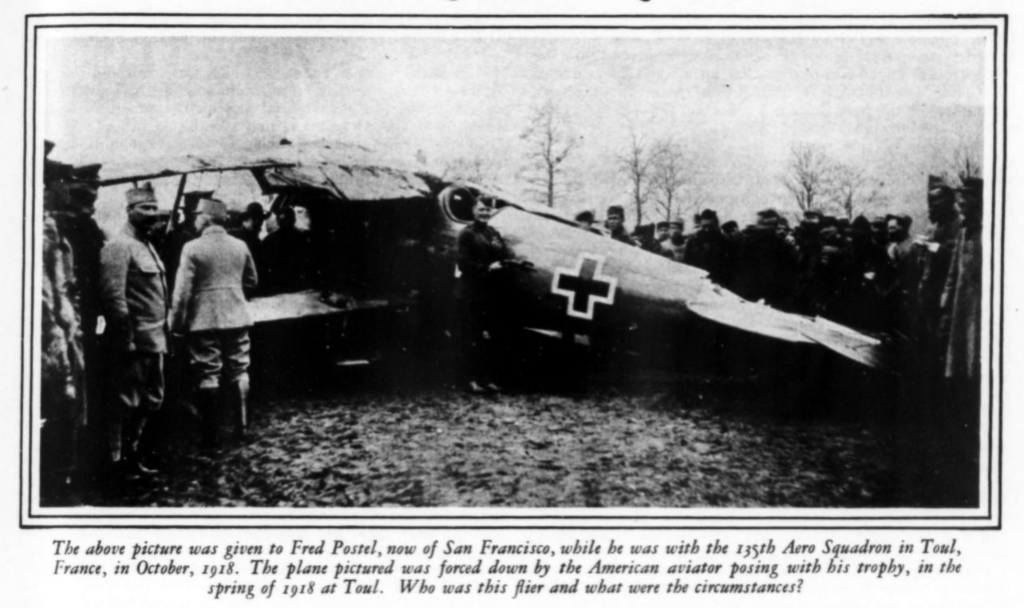
Lt Alan Winslow with Plane he shot down 14 April 1918

At Toul, active combat patrols and alerts immediately commenced, over the sector from Saint-Mihiel to Pont a Mousson. On a cloudy Sunday morning, 14 April, an alert was given and Lieutenants Douglas Campbell and Alan F. Winslow took off. A few minutes later, two enemy aircraft were seen moving through some clouds, and after a brief combat, Lt Campbell shot down one of the enemy and Lt Winslow forced the other down out of control. Both crashed on the ground. (The enemy planes were from JAsta 64: Vzfw Anton Wroniecki (shot down by Douglas Campbell) and Uffz Heinrich Simon (shot down by Alan Winslow)These were the first official American air combat victories of World War I. On 29 April, Captain Hall and Lt. Rickenbacker responded to an alert and shot down an enemy aircraft just over the lines. Air combats began to become more frequent and by 3 May, the squadron had four aerial victories. However, on that day, the squadron suffered its first casualty, when Lt. Charles W. Chapman was shot down in flames by a biplane, which Captain Peterson later shot down.

On 5 May, the 94th was organized, along with the 95th Aero Squadron into the 1st Pursuit Group. In combat, the squadron was succeeding in defeating the enemy, and in a few weeks, the 94th gained the first American air aces. On 31 May, Lieutenant Campbell gained his fifth victory; on 17 June, Lieutenant Rickenbacker also became an ace. However, the squadron had also suffered several losses. Captain Hall had been brought down and became a prisoner. Major Lufbery attacked a German plane flying over Toul and was shot down in flames. In combat over Maiseraes, Lieutenant Davis was killed in action and Lieutenant Hill was seriously wounded in the leg while in combat on 27 May over Montsec. By the end of June, the 94th Aero Squadron was the leading pursuit squadron in the AEF, having seventeen official victories with four casualties.

On 29 June, the 1st Pursuit Group moved to the Chateau Thierry sector and to Touquin Aerodrome. There, the 94th began receiving SPAD XIIIs, replacing the unpopular Nieuport 28s. On 1 July, Lieutenant Coolage shot down his first enemy aircraft, he would later become a flying ace. On 9 July, the squadron moved again, this time to Saints Aerodrome, which was nearer the front lines. However, unlike the Toul Sector, this sector was not as active with German aircraft and only a few enemy aircraft were shot down during the months of July and August. During the latter part of August, the front line had receded to such a distance that the Coincy Aerodrome, built by the French "Aeronautique Militaire" earlier in 1918 and lost to the German offensive, was used as an auxiliary landing field. However, with the Germans retreating, the 1st Pursuit Group was given a short period of repose until arrangements could be made to move to a new sector. The squadron engaged in target practice and formation flying for new pilots and the senior pilots were given a much needed and well-deserved rest.

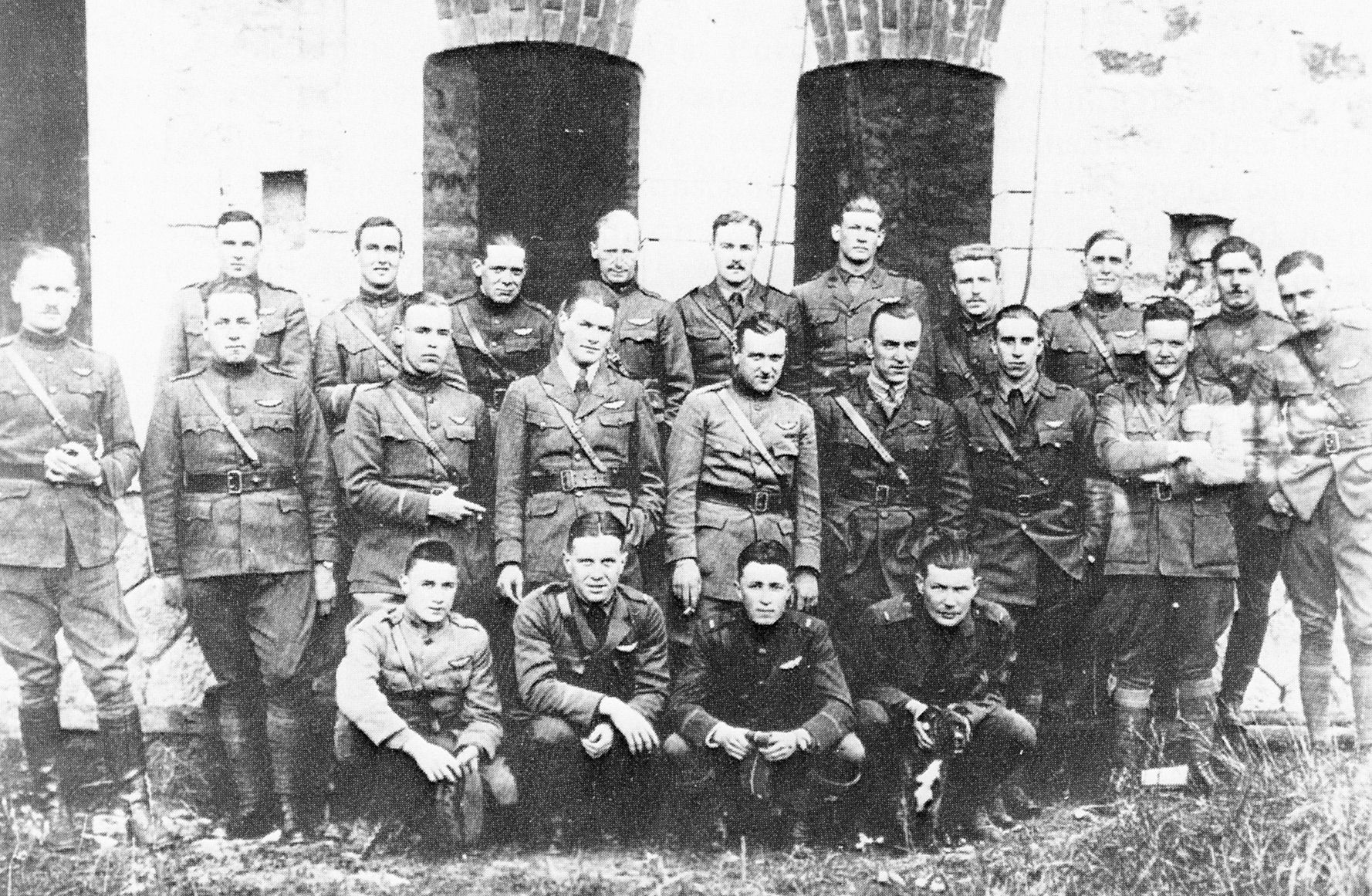
94th Aero Squadron, Rembercourt Aerodrome, France, November 1918.

On 30 August, the 94th was ordered moved to Rembercourt Aerodrome in preparation for the St. Mihiel Offensive. However, little flying was done in the new sector initially in order not to let the enemy know of the American build-up of forces. On 12 September the American offensive was begun. The squadron employed a new tactic of low-level patrols, below 600m, flying from dawn until dusk. The 94th was given the mission of attacking enemy observation balloons as spotted and to machine-gun enemy infantry and other targets as observed in order to aid First Army in its advance. During the period from 12 September until the Armistice on 11 November, the 94th Aero Squadron shot down 47 enemy aircraft. Several pilots became aces. Pilots also brought back invaluable intelligence concerning information about enemy rear areas.

It was during the St. Mihiel and later the Meuse-Argonne Offensive that Captain Rickenbacker shot down over twenty enemy aircraft. On 25 September, he brought down two enemy planes within a few minutes of each other. Four of his victories were balloons, which he attacked at dusk while they were lying on the ground. While Captain Rickenbacker was adding to his number of combat victories, Captain Hamilton Coolidge was also successfully defeating the enemy. During the period from 2 October to 13 October, he shot down seven enemy aircraft and two balloons. However, on 27 October, while leading his flight along the lines, he was hit by an enemy anti-aircraft shell and crashed in flames.

Lieutenant Harvey Cook also became one of the leading aces of the squadron. During October he shot down seven enemy aircraft, and five balloons. He had the distinction of being chosen for the dangerous and difficult work of balloon strafing in the early morning and just before dusk. In one attack, he attacked an enemy balloon that lay on the ground between two tall trees. It was necessary that he dived between the trees three times before the balloon went up in flames.

During the closing days of the war, reports indicated that enemy activity had dwindled to a great extent. Only a few biplanes and an occasional enemy formation of aircraft were seen. Hostilities ended on 10 November, as unfavorable weather caused the squadron to be grounded on the morning of 11 November.

=== Demobilization ===
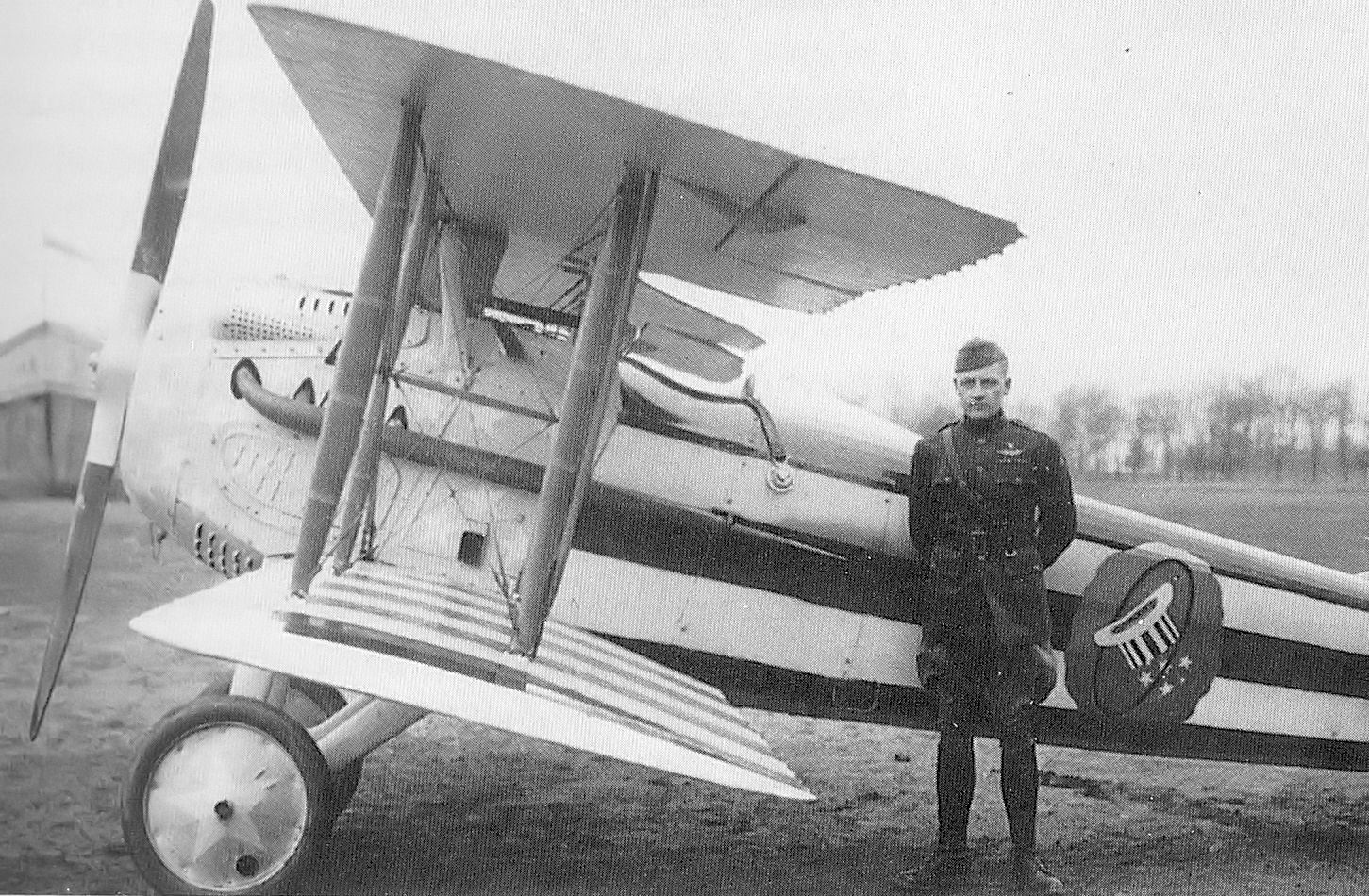
Major Reed Chambers, AEF 94th Pursuit Squadron, Coblenz, Germany, 1919 next to a SPAD XIII. Major Chambers was formerly a member of the Tennessee National Guard aviation department in 1914.

Proficiency flights were conducted after the Armistice with Germany, however, no flights were permitted to be flown over German-controlled territory. On 20 November, the squadron was transferred to the Third Army Air Service, staying at the Noers aerodrome, built by the Germans, until the last days of December, then moved to Koblenz, arriving on the 31st, to take part in the Occupation forces. The squadron remained at Koblenz until orders were received for the squadron to report to the 1st Air Depot, Colombey-les-Belles Airdrome to turn in all of its supplies and equipment and was relieved from duty with the AEF, arriving there on 17 April. The squadron's SPAD aircraft were delivered to the Air Service American Air Service Acceptance Park No. 1 at Orly Aerodrome to be returned to the French. There practically all of the pilots and observers were detached from the squadron.

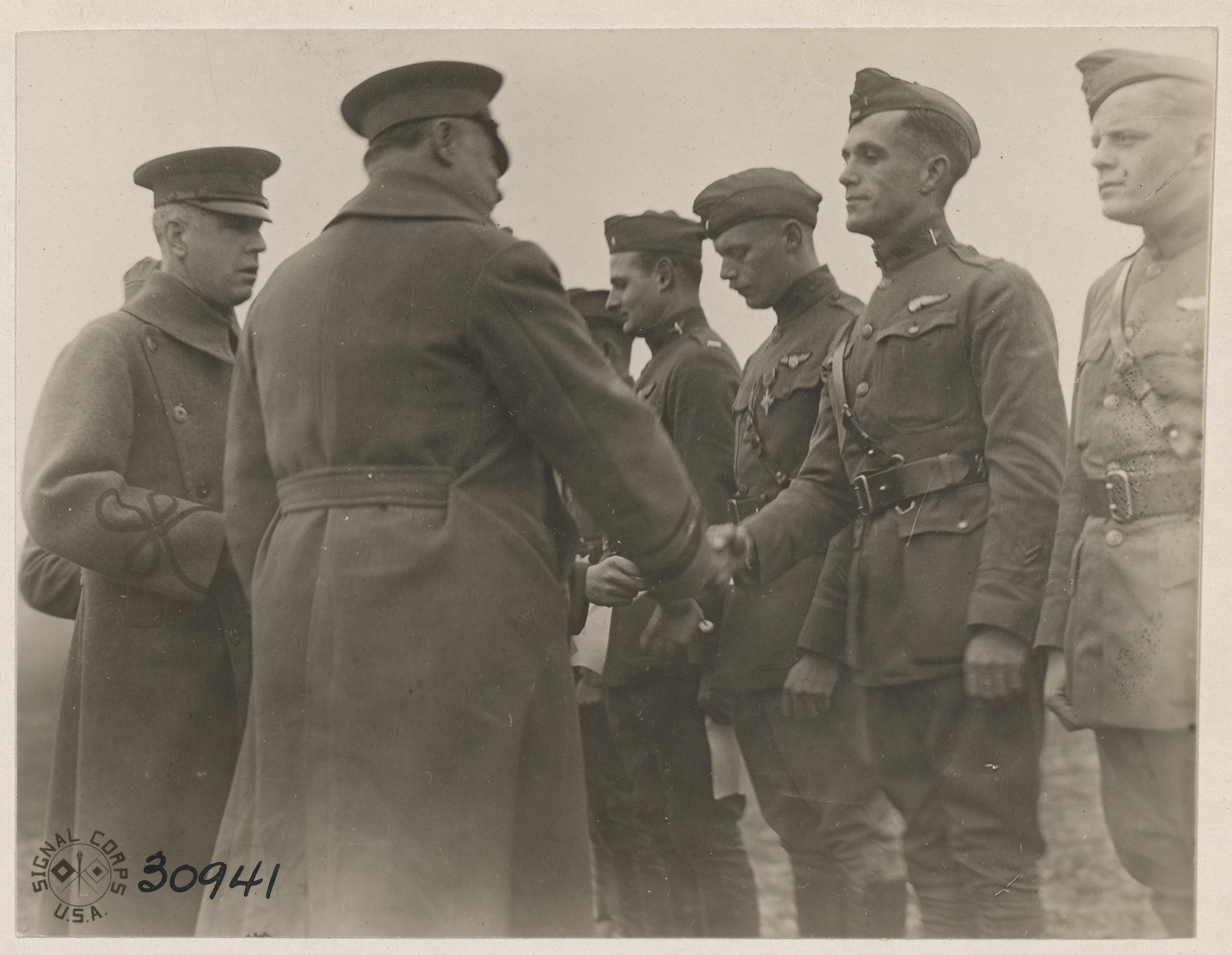
Lieutenant General Hunter Liggett awarding the Distinguished Service Cross to First Lieutenant Hugh Brewster of the 94th Aerial P. S. Squadron, Remicourt, Marne, France, 18 December 1918

Personnel at Colombey were subsequently assigned to the Commanding General, Services of Supply and ordered to report to one of several staging camps in France. There, personnel awaited scheduling to report to a staging camp at Le Mans on 5 May where it waited for a brief period before proceeding to its port of embarkation in France. The 94th Aero Squadron arrived in New York Harbor on 30 May and reported to Mitchel Field on 1 June. There most of the men were demobilized and returned to civilian life.

The squadron returned home in the spring of 1919, and after several moves, the 94th settled with the 1st Pursuit Group at Selfridge Field, Michigan, in July 1922. In 1923, the unit was re-designated the 94th Pursuit Squadron, which was later re-designated as the 94th Fighter Squadron (q.v.).

== Lineage ==
- Organized as 94th Aero Squadron on 20 August 1917

Re-designated as: 94th Aero Squadron (Pursuit), on 30 March 1918
Re-designated as: 94th Aero Squadron, 1 June 1919
Re-designated as: 94th Squadron (Pursuit), on 14 March 1921

== Assignments ==
- Post Headquarters, Kelly Field, 20 August 1917
- Aviation Concentration Center, 5 October 1917
- Headquarters Air Service, AEF, 12 November 1917

Attached to French Air Service for training, 19 November 1917 – 24 January 1918

- 3d Instructional Center, 24 January 1918
- 1st Pursuit Organization and Training Center, 5 March 1918
- 1st Pursuit Group, 5 May 1918
- Third Army Air Service, 21 November 1918
- 1st Air Depot, 16 April 1919
- Commanding General, Services of Supply, 5 May 1919
- Post Headquarters, Mitchel Field, 1 June 1919

== Stations ==
- Kelly Field, Texas, 20 August 1917
- Aviation Concentration Center, Garden City, New York, 5 October 1917
- Port of Entry, Hoboken, New Jersey

Overseas transport: RMS Adriatic, 27 October – 10 November 1917

- Liverpool, England, 10 November 1917
- British Rest Camp No. 2, Le Havre, France, 11 November 1917
- Reuilly Barracks, Paris, France, 18 November 1917

Squadron divided into flights and sent to several aviation factories near Paris for training

- Issoudun Aerodrome, France, 24 January 1918
- Villeneuve-les-Vertus Aerodrome, France, 5 March 1918
- Epiez Aerodrome, France, 1 April 1918
- Croix de Metz Aerodrome, Toul, France, 7 April 1918
- Touquin Aerodrome, France, 29 June 1918
- Saints Aerodrome, France, 9 July 1918 (advance airfield at Coincy).
- Rembercourt Aerodrome, France, 30 August 1918
- Noers Aerodrome (near Longuyon), France, 20 November 1918
- Coblenz Airdrome, Fort Kaiser Alexander, Germany, 31 December 1918
- Colombey-les-Belles Airdrome, France, 17 April 1919
- Le Mans, France, 5–18 May 1919
- Mitchel Field, New York, 1 June 1919

== Combat sectors and campaigns ==
Streamer	Sector/Campaign	Dates	Notes
	Toul Sector	14 April – 29 June 1918; 4–11 September 1918	
	Aisne-Marne Sector	30 June – 14 July 1918	
	Champagne-Marne Defensive Campaign	15–18 July 1918	
	Aisne-Marne Offensive Campaign	18 July – 6 August 1918.	
	Vesle Sector	7–29 August 1918	
	St. Mihiel Offensive Campaign	12–16 September 1918	
	Verdun Sector	17–25 September 1918	
	Meuse-Argonne Offensive Campaign	26 September – 11 November 1918	

== Notable personnel ==
- Cpt. Edward Vernon Rickenbacker, Medal of Honor, DSC (7x), air ace

- Maj. Raoul Lufbery, air ace (KIA)
- Lt. Alexander B Bruce, (KIA)
- Lt. William W. Chalmers, POW
- Lt. Douglas Campbell, DSC (5x), air ace
- Lt. Reed M. Chambers, DSC (4x), air ace
- Lt. Charles W. Chapman, Jr. (KIA)
- Cpt. Harvey W. Cook, DSC (2x), SSC, air ace
- Cpt. Hamilton Coolidge, DSC, air ace (KIA)
- Lt. Charles T. Crocker III, Order of the Crown
- Lt Phillip W. Davis, (KIA)
- Lt. Leo H. Dawson, DSC (2x), SSC, 4 aerial victories
- Cpt. John Owen Donaldson, C.O., 1920
- Maj. James B. Hall, POW
- Lt. John N. Jeffers, DSC, 2 aerial victories
- Lt. Samuel Kaye, Jr., DSC (2x), 4 aerial victories
- Cpt. Field E. Kindley, C.O., 1920
- Lt Paul B. Kurtz, (KIA)
- Lt. James A. Meissner, DSC (2x), air ace
- Cpt. John Mitchell, DSC, 1 aerial victory
- Lt. Alan Nutt, DSC, 1 aerial victory (KIA)
- Lt. William W. Palmer, DSC, 3 aerial victories
- Cpt. David M. Peterson, DSC (2x), air ace
- Lt. Eugene R. Scroggie, POW
- Lt. Alden B. Sherry, SSC
- Lt. Walter W. Smyth, (KIA)
- Cpt. Thorne C. Taylor, SSC
- Lt. Harold H. Tittman, DSC
- Lt. Alan F. Winslow, DSC, 2 aerial victories

DSC: Distinguished Service Cross; SSC: Silver Star Citation; KIA: Killed in Action

== See also ==
- Organization of the Air Service of the American Expeditionary Force
- List of American Aero Squadrons
