= Hartley Moon =

Adjunct General of Alabama

Colonel Hartley Allen Moon (February 5, 1877 – April 9, 1946) was the adjutant general of Alabama from 1919 to 1927.

Moon was born in Goodwater, Alabama. At the rank of major, Moon commanded the US Infantry 167th 2nd Battalion during World War I; they arrived in France in late 1917 and saw action in the Lorraine region in early 1918. Moon was wounded in the action.

After the war, he helped World War I flying ace James Meissner in the transformation of the Birmingham Flying Club into the 135th Observation Squadron, which was assigned to the state of Alabama in 1922.

In the late 1920s, he had a house built in the Cloverdale-Idlewild neighborhood of Montgomery, a house which was later inhabited by Wayne Greenhaw. In the 1930s he served as colonel in the Alabama National Guard.

He died in Montgomery, Alabama in 1946, aged 69.
