= Goodwater, Alabama =

- Town
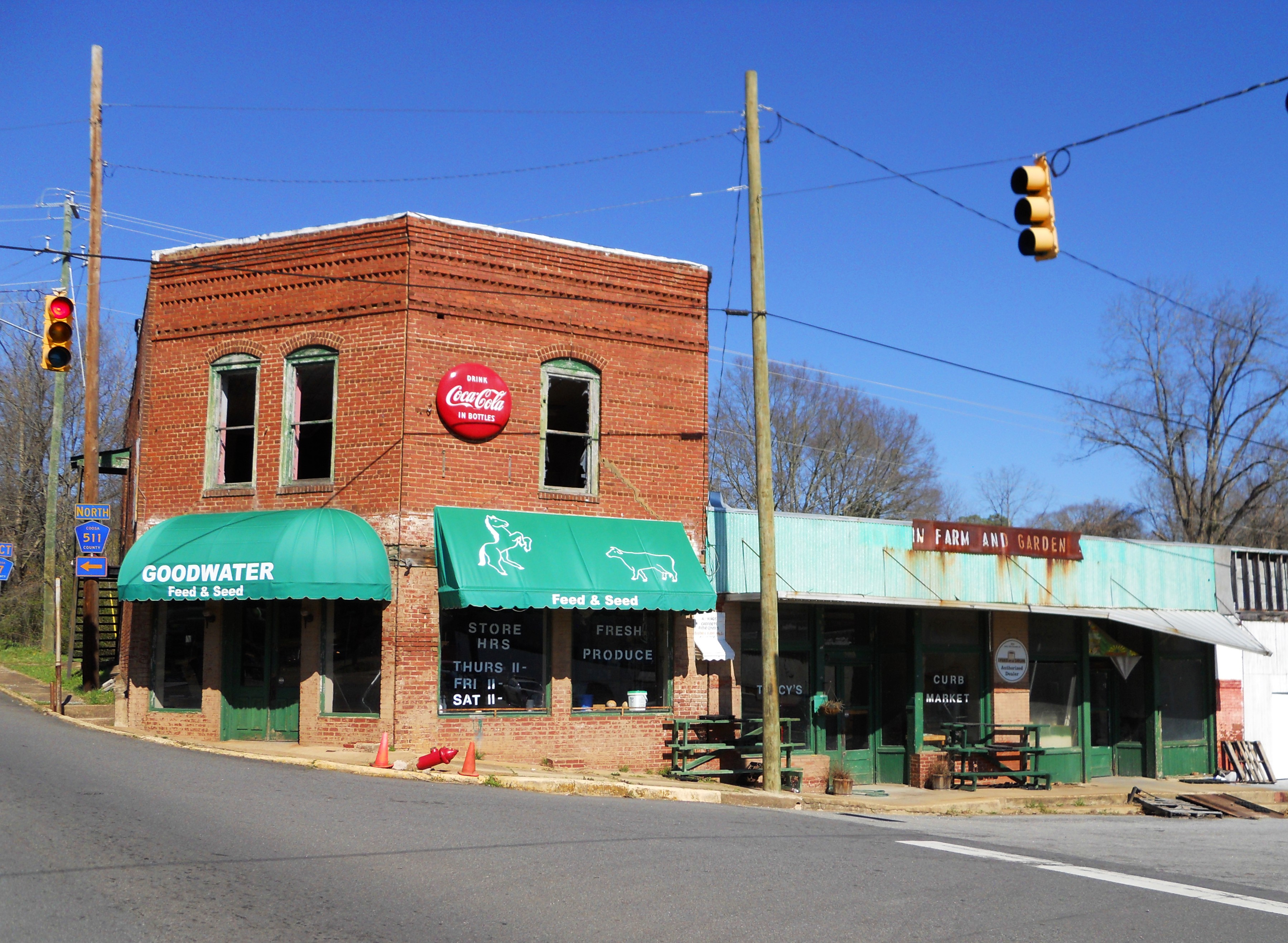
- Goodwater in 2011

- Logo

- Location of Goodwater in Coosa County, Alabama.
- Coordinates: 33°03′39″N 86°03′06″W
- Country: United States
- State: Alabama
- County: Coosa

Area
  - Total: 6.53 sq mi (16.90 km^{2})
  - Land: 6.49 sq mi (16.82 km^{2})
  - Water: 0.031 sq mi (0.08 km^{2})
- Elevation: 801 ft (244 m)

Population (2020)
  - Total: 1,291
  - Density: 198.8/sq mi (76.75/km^{2})
- Time zone: UTC-6 (Central (CST))
  - Summer (DST): UTC-5 (CDT)
- ZIP code: 35072
- Area code: 256
- FIPS code: 01-30640
- GNIS feature ID: 2406589
- Website: www.cityofgoodwater.com

Goodwater is a town in Coosa County, Alabama, United States. At the 2020 census, the population was 1,291. It is part of the Talladega-Sylacauga Micropolitan Statistical Area.

== Geography ==
Goodwater is located near the northeast corner of Coosa County.

According to the U.S. Census Bureau, the city has a total area of 6.5 square miles (16.9 km^{2}), of which 0.03 square miles (0.08 km^{2}), or 0.45%, is water.

=== Climate ===
According to the Köppen climate classification, Goodwater has a humid subtropical climate (abbreviated Cfa).

Climate data for Goodwater, 1991–2020 simulated normals (837 ft elevation)
Month	Jan	Feb	Mar	Apr	May	Jun	Jul	Aug	Sep	Oct	Nov	Dec	Year
Mean daily maximum °F (°C)	55.0 (12.8)	59.4 (15.2)	67.1 (19.5)	74.5 (23.6)	81.3 (27.4)	87.3 (30.7)	90.1 (32.3)	89.2 (31.8)	84.6 (29.2)	75.7 (24.3)	65.3 (18.5)	57.4 (14.1)	73.9 (23.3)
Daily mean °F (°C)	43.7 (6.5)	47.3 (8.5)	54.1 (12.3)	61.5 (16.4)	69.4 (20.8)	76.3 (24.6)	79.5 (26.4)	78.6 (25.9)	73.4 (23.0)	63.0 (17.2)	52.7 (11.5)	46.2 (7.9)	62.1 (16.8)
Mean daily minimum °F (°C)	32.4 (0.2)	35.2 (1.8)	41.4 (5.2)	48.4 (9.1)	57.4 (14.1)	65.5 (18.6)	68.9 (20.5)	68.2 (20.1)	62.2 (16.8)	50.4 (10.2)	39.9 (4.4)	35.1 (1.7)	50.4 (10.2)
Average precipitation inches (mm)	5.48 (139.11)	5.46 (138.64)	5.62 (142.79)	4.87 (123.62)	4.30 (109.20)	4.81 (122.20)	4.89 (124.08)	4.46 (113.40)	3.61 (91.81)	3.25 (82.64)	4.42 (112.15)	5.41 (137.29)	56.58 (1,436.93)
Average dew point °F (°C)	34.3 (1.3)	36.9 (2.7)	42.3 (5.7)	49.6 (9.8)	59.4 (15.2)	66.9 (19.4)	70.2 (21.2)	69.4 (20.8)	64.2 (17.9)	53.8 (12.1)	43.2 (6.2)	37.9 (3.3)	52.3 (11.3)
Source: PRISM Climate Group

== Demographics ==
Historical population
Census	Pop.	Note	%±
1890	589		—
1900	728		23.6%
1910	740		1.6%
1920	920		24.3%
1930	996		8.3%
1940	1,028		3.2%
1950	1,227		19.4%
1960	2,023		64.9%
1970	2,172		7.4%
1980	1,895		−12.8%
1990	1,840		−2.9%
2000	1,633		−11.2%
2010	1,475		−9.7%
2020	1,291		−12.5%
U.S. Decennial Census; 2013 Estimate

=== Racial and ethnic composition ===
Goodwater town, Alabama – Racial and ethnic composition Note: the US Census treats Hispanic/Latino as an ethnic category. This table excludes Latinos from the racial categories and assigns them to a separate category. Hispanics/Latinos may be of any race. Race and ethnicity was not surveyed for populations under 2,500 in the 1980 census and under 1,000 in 1990 census.
Race / Ethnicity (NH = Non-Hispanic)	Pop 1990	Pop 2000	Pop 2010	Pop 2020	% 1990	% 2000	% 2010	% 2020
White alone (NH)	557	414	357	273	30.27%	25.35%	24.20%	21.15%
Black or African American alone (NH)	1,254	1,194	1,083	972	68.15%	73.12%	73.42%	75.29%
Native American or Alaska Native alone (NH)	21	5	11	0	1.14%	0.31%	0.75%	0.00%
Asian alone (NH)	2	2	0	2	0.11%	0.12%	0.00%	0.15%
Native Hawaiian or Pacific Islander alone (NH)	x	0	0	0	x	0.00%	0.00%	0.00%
Other race alone (NH)	1	1	5	3	0.05%	0.06%	0.34%	0.23%
Mixed race or Multiracial (NH)	x	8	8	35	x	0.49%	0.54%	2.71%
Hispanic or Latino (any race)	5	9	11	6	0.27%	0.55%	0.75%	0.46%
Total	1,840	1,633	1,475	1,291	100.00%	100.00%	100.00%	100.00%

=== 2020 census ===
As of the 2020 census, Goodwater had a population of 1,291. The median age was 48.3 years. 20.9% of residents were under the age of 18 and 23.9% of residents were 65 years of age or older. For every 100 females there were 73.8 males, and for every 100 females age 18 and over there were 71.6 males age 18 and over.

0.0% of residents lived in urban areas, while 100.0% lived in rural areas.

There were 555 households in Goodwater, of which 27.9% had children under the age of 18 living in them. Of all households, 27.7% were married-couple households, 22.2% were households with a male householder and no spouse or partner present, and 46.5% were households with a female householder and no spouse or partner present. About 40.3% of all households were made up of individuals and 16.7% had someone living alone who was 65 years of age or older. There were 230 families residing in the town.

There were 677 housing units, of which 18.0% were vacant. The homeowner vacancy rate was 1.0% and the rental vacancy rate was 5.4%.

=== 2010 census ===
At the 2010 census there were 1,475 people, 618 households, and 394 families living in the city. The population density was 227 inhabitants per square mile (88/km^{2}). There were 708 housing units at an average density of 108.4 per square mile (41.9/km^{2}). The racial makeup of the city was 73.7% Black or African American, 24.3% White, 0.7% Native American, 0.0% Asian, 0.7% from other races, and 0.5% from two or more races. 0.7% of the population were Hispanic or Latino of any race. The age distribution was 22.2% under the age of 18, 6.8% from 18 to 24, 22.9% from 25 to 44, 28.3% from 45 to 64, and 19.7% 65 or older. The median age was 43.6 years. For every 100 females, there were 88.1 males. For every 100 females age 18 and over, there were 90.4 males.

The median household income was $24,909 and the median family income was $31,081. Males had a median income of $24,554 versus $24,348 for females. The per capita income for the city was $12,957. About 23.6% of families and 28.2% of the population were below the poverty line, including 48.2% of those under age 18 and 18.3% of those age 65 or over.

=== 2000 census ===
At the 2000 census there were 1,633 people, 621 households, and 424 families living in the city. The population density was 249.6 inhabitants per square mile (96.4/km^{2}). There were 727 housing units at an average density of 111.1 per square mile (42.9/km^{2}). The racial makeup of the city was 73.30% Black or African American, 25.66% White, 0.31% Native American, 0.12% Asian, 0.06% from other races, and 0.55% from two or more races. 0.55% of the population were Hispanic or Latino of any race. The age distribution was 25.3% under the age of 18, 8.3% from 18 to 24, 25.3% from 25 to 44, 23.4% from 45 to 64, and 17.8% 65 or older. The median age was 38 years. For every 100 females, there were 87.5 males. For every 100 females age 18 and over, there were 80.7 males.

The median household income was $22,188 and the median family income was $28,819. Males had a median income of $22,414 versus $17,464 for females. The per capita income for the city was $10,602. About 21.0% of families and 23.3% of the population were below the poverty line, including 33.8% of those under age 18 and 12.0% of those age 65 or over.

== Notable people ==
- Robert Daniel Carmichael, mathematician for whom Carmichael numbers are named
- Colonel Hartley A. Moon, adjutant general of Alabama
- Jamario Moon, professional basketball player
- Xavier Moon, professional basketball player

== Photo Gallery ==
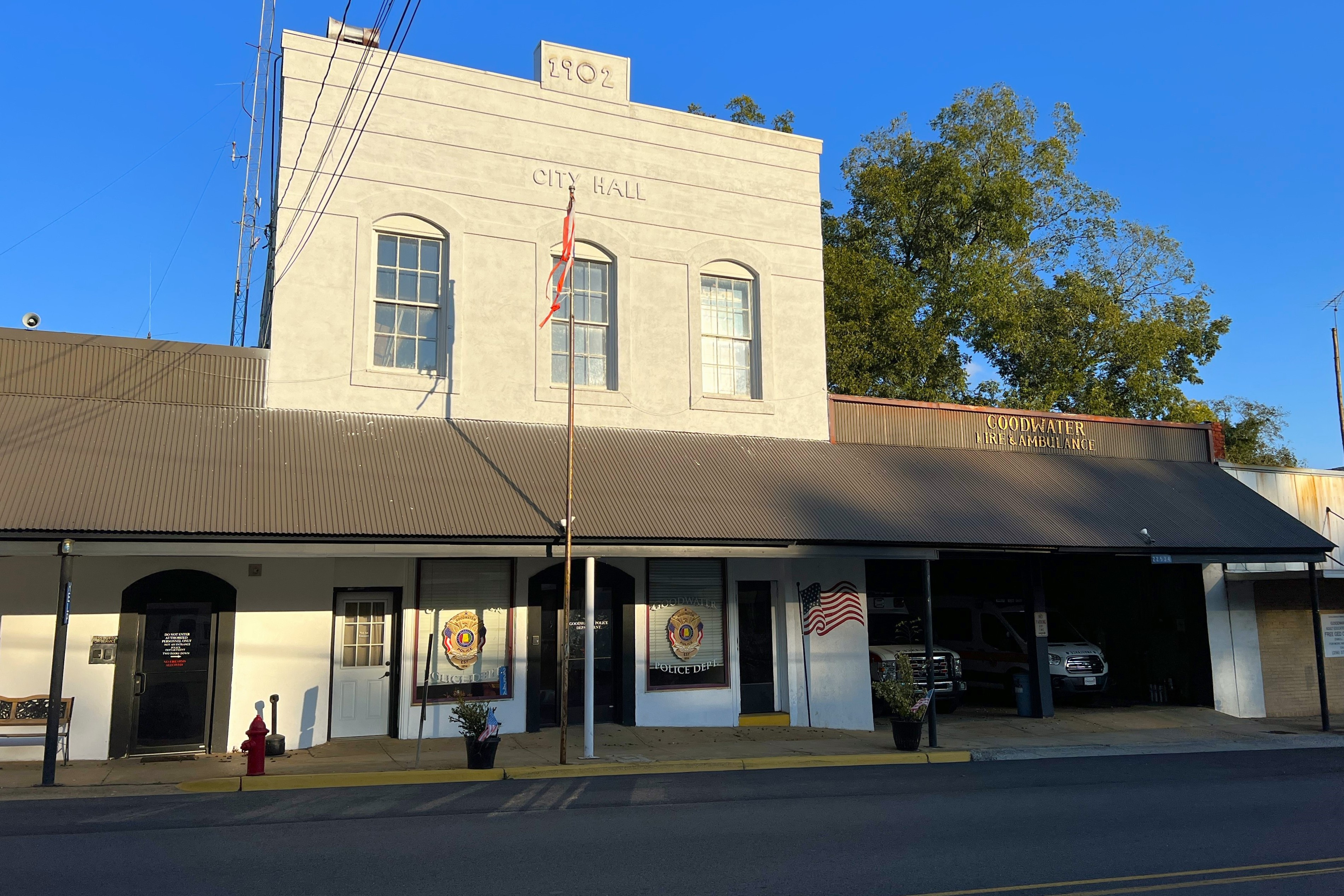
Goodwater City Hall

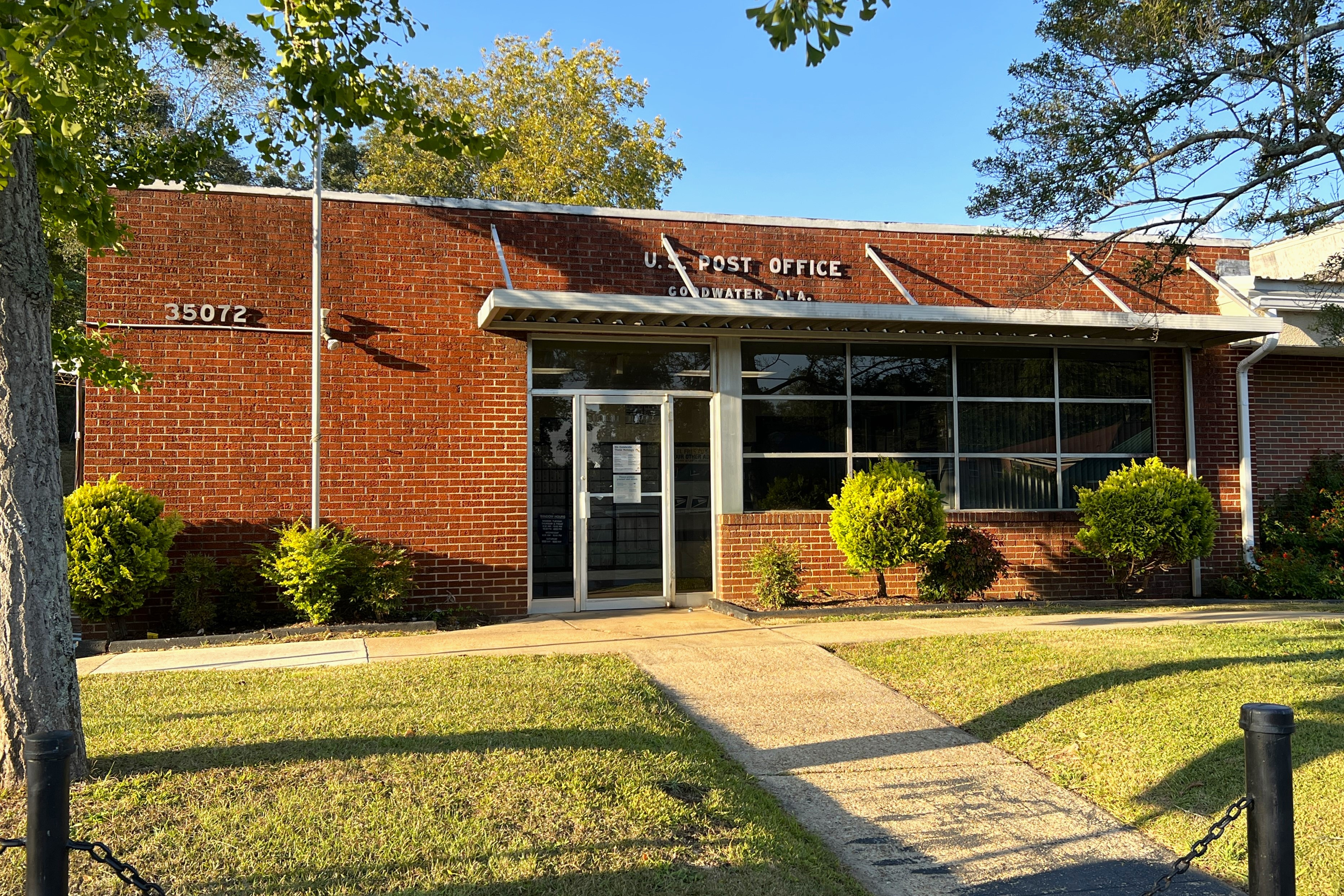
Goodwater Post Office (ZIP code: 35072)

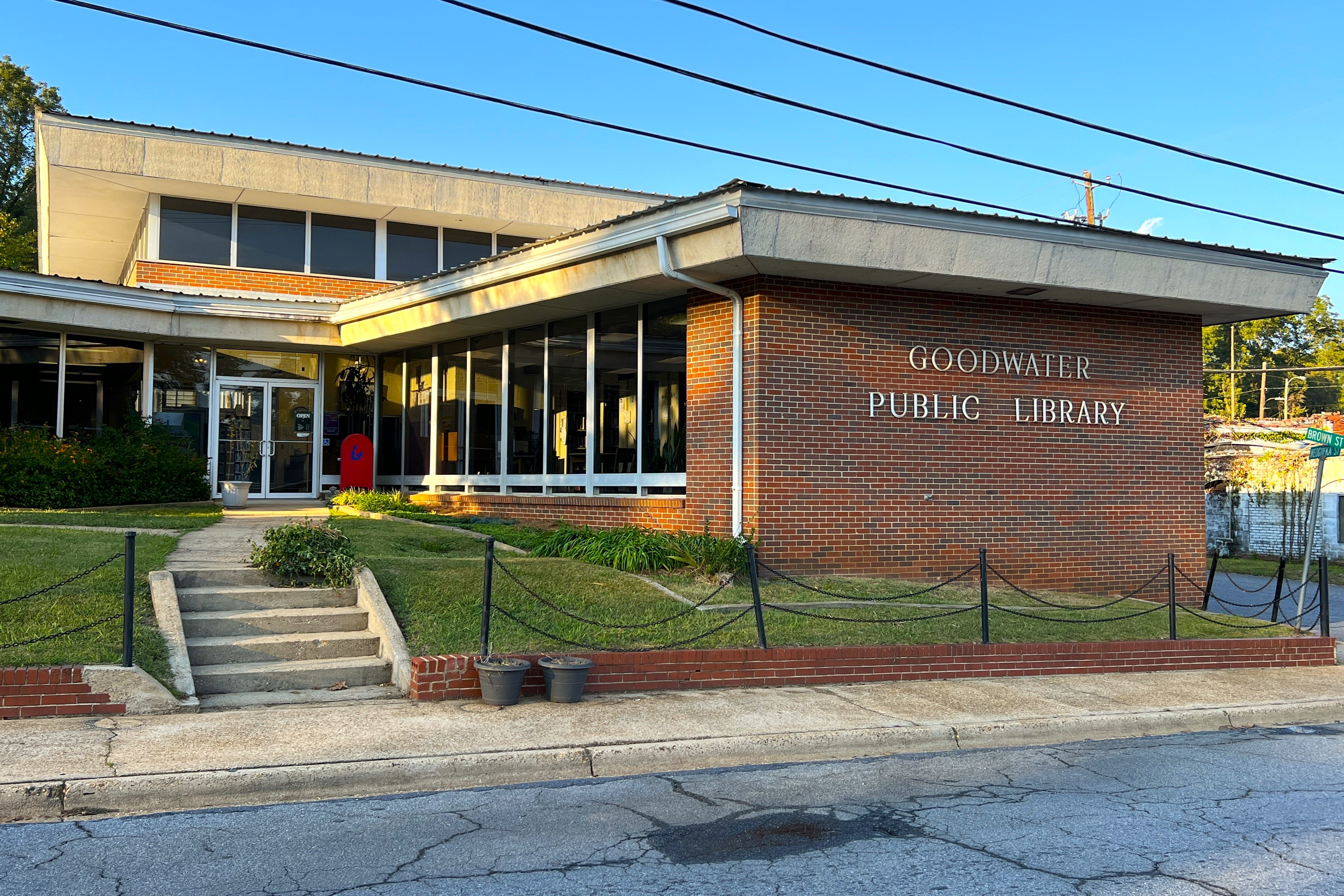
Goodwater Public Library
