= Reed McKinley Chambers =

American flying ace (1894–1972)

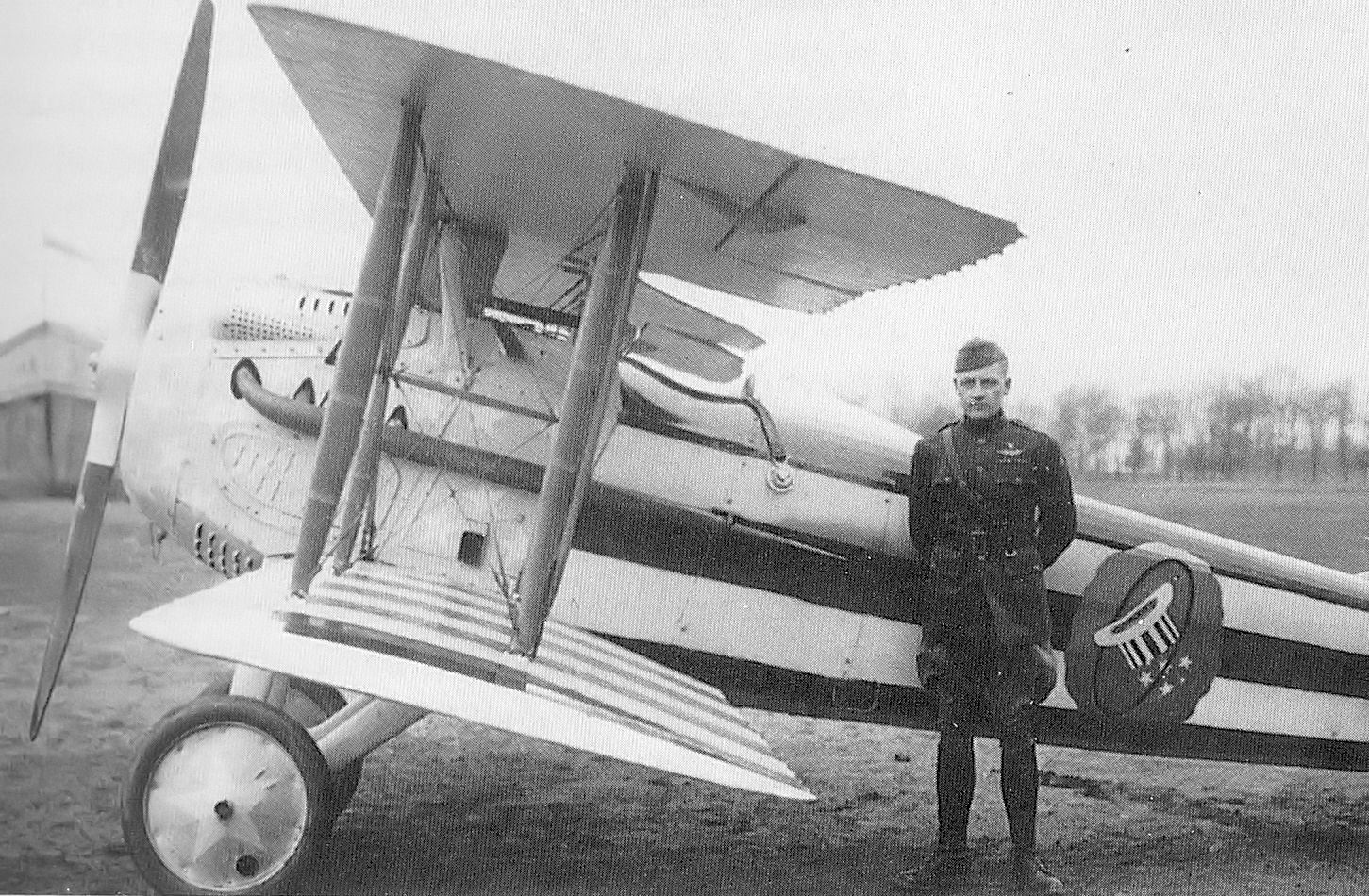
- Major Reed McKinley Chambers, AEF 94th Pursuit Squadron, France, 1918
- Born: 18 August 1894; Onaga, Kansas, USA
- Died: 16 January 1972 (aged 77); Saint Thomas, Virgin Islands
- Military career
- Allegiance: United States
- Branch: Air Service, United States Army
- Service years: 1914 - 1920
- Rank: Major
- Unit: Air Service, United States Army: 94th Aero Squadron
- Conflicts: World War I
- Awards: Distinguished Service Cross with three Oak Leaf Clusters, French Legion d'Honneur and Croix de Guerre
- Other work: Founded aviation insurance business

Reed McKinley Chambers was a pioneer in the American Aviation industry, as a flying ace in World War I, as founder of an early airline, and as founder and chairman of America's first aviation insurance company.

== Early life and military service ==
Major Reed McKinley Chambers (1894-1972) was born August 18, 1894, in Onaga, Kansas. In 1914 he joined the Tennessee National Guard and served in the Mexican border campaign of 1916.

When the United States entered World War I in 1917, Chambers received a transfer to the Army Signal Corps as an aviator. He served in the 94th Aero Pursuit Squadron, along with American Ace of Aces Eddie Rickenbacker. Chambers was credited with seven victories over German aircraft. Among his awards were the Distinguished Service Cross, the French Legion of Honor, and the Croix de Guerre.

== Later life ==
After the war, Chambers, along with Rickenbacker, founded Florida Airways, which in 1926 received the first private airmail contract awarded by the U.S. Government. After the airline's uninsured aircraft suffered a series of accidents and damage caused by hurricanes, the airline declared bankruptcy in 1927. As a result of this loss, Chambers teamed with David Beebe and the two founded the United States Aircraft Insurance Group, the nation's first aviation insurance company. The security provided by this company ensured the development and testing of such pioneering aircraft as the Douglas DC-3, the Boeing 707, the B-52 jet bomber, and the General Dynamics F-111A.

While flying second seat in a Convair F-106 Delta Dart in 1968, Chambers broke the sound barrier.

Reed Chambers died in St. Thomas, U.S. Virgin Islands, on January 16, 1972.

== See also ==
- List of World War I flying aces from the United States
- Barber's pole—notes regarding Chambers' aircraft.

== Bibliography ==
- American Aces of World War I. Norman Franks, Harry Dempsey. Osprey Publishing, 2001. ISBN 1-84176-375-6, ISBN 978-1-84176-375-0.
- The Hat in the Ring Gang: The Combat History of the 94th Aero Squadron in World War I. Charles Woolley. Schiffer Publishing Ltd., Atglen, PA: 2001. ISBN 0-7643-1427-0, ISBN 978-0-7643-1427-8.

== online link ==
- Reed chambers at the aerodrome forum
