= Harvey Weir Cook =

American flying ace

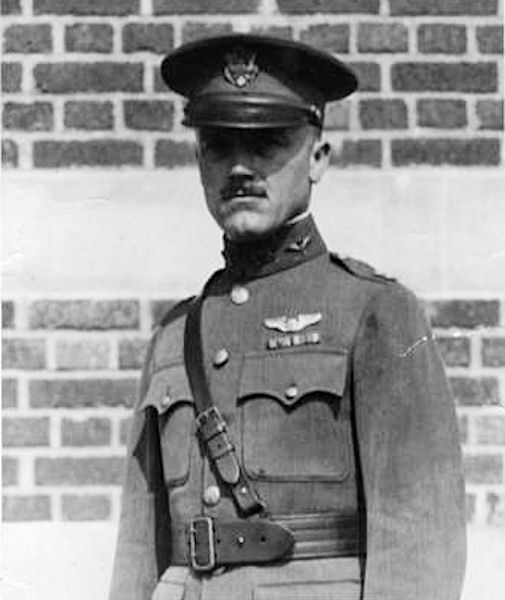
- Captain Harvey Weir Cook, 94th Aero Squadron
- Born: June 30, 1892; Wilkinson, Indiana, U.S.
- Died: March 24, 1943 (aged 50); Oua Tom, New Caledonia
- Burial place: National Memorial Cemetery of the Pacific, Honolulu, Hawaii
- Military career
- Allegiance: United States
- Branch: Air Service, United States Army; United States Army Air Forces
- Unit: Air Service, United States Army: 94th Aero Squadron
- Conflicts: World War I World War II

Harvey Weir Cook (June 30, 1892 – March 24, 1943) was an American fighter ace in World War I and Distinguished Service Cross recipient. He was also a pioneer in civilian commercial aviation and a leading figure in the development of aviation in the United States and in the state of Indiana. The Indianapolis International Airport terminal building and entrance road are named in his honor.

== Early life ==
Cook was born in Wilkinson, Indiana, to Dr. B. H. Cook of Wilkinson, Indiana, who had moved to Anderson, Indiana when Harvey Weir Cook was very young. He graduated from Anderson High School and attended college at both DePauw University in Greencastle, Indiana, and Washington & Jefferson College in Washington, Pennsylvania. At DePauw he was a member of Delta Kappa Epsilon fraternity.

== World War I ==
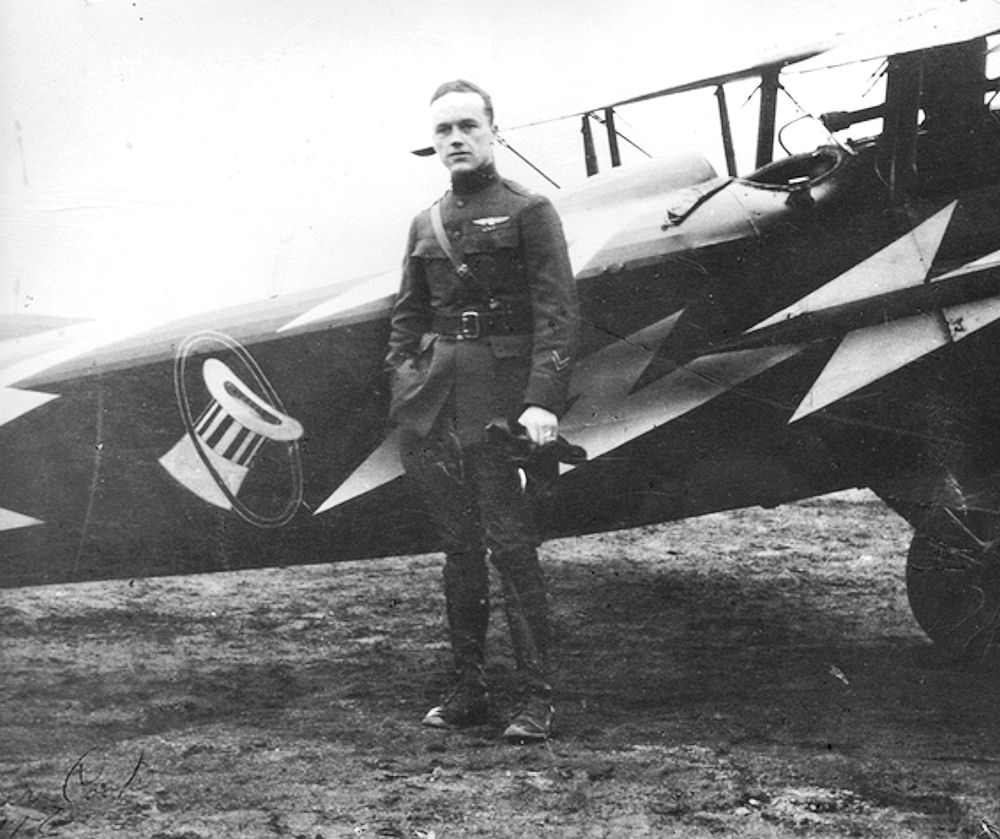
Cook at Foucaucourt Aerodrome, November 1918

"Weir", as he was known, left Washington and Jefferson University to drive an ambulance in France early in 1917. When the U. S. entered the war, Cook enlisted in the aviation section of the Army Signal Corps. After flight training, he was assigned to Captain Eddie Rickenbacker's famous "Hat in the Ring" 94th Aero Squadron. Incredibly aggressive in combat, he was twice cited for singly attacking formations of multiple German fighters. He was awarded the Distinguished Service Cross with Oak Leaf Cluster. His citations read as follows:

The Distinguished Service Cross is presented to Harvey Weir Cook, Captain (Air Service), U.S. Army, for extraordinary heroism in action near Bois-de-Dole, France, August 1, 1918. Sighting six enemy mono- place planes at an altitude of 3,500 meters, Captain Cook, attacked them despite their numerical superiority, shooting down one and driving off the others.

The Distinguished Service Cross is presented to Harvey Weir Cook, Captain (Air Service), U.S. Army, for extraordinary heroism in action near Crepion, France, October 30, 1918. Captain Cook attacked three enemy bi-place planes at an altitude of 1,000 meters. After a few minutes of severe fighting his guns jammed, but after clearing the jam he returned to the attack, shot down one of his adversaries in flames, and forced the other two to retire to their own lines.

Captain Weir Cook was credited with seven victories, including four enemy balloons, and he was promoted to captain in 1919. He was honorably discharged from the 94th Aero Squadron on 2 Jun 1919 and assumed command of the 147th Aero Squadron on 18 Sep 1919. On 26 Dec 1919 Cook was relieved of command of 147th Aero Squadron and honorably discharged.

Cook and Rickenbacker became friends, known to each other as "Weird" and "Rick". Both were strong proponents of more adequate training for rookie combat pilots, having themselves benefited from aerial combat training by Lafayette Escadrille veteran Raoul Lufbery and others.

== Between the wars ==
After World War I, Cook helped to form the U.S. Army's U.S. Air Mail Service and was one of the first transcontinental airmail pilots. Cook spent only a few months (from August 23, 1920, until December 8, 1920) in the airmail service. During that time, he was assigned for three months to the Western Division. After flying the Rock Springs to Salt Lake City route, he called those 150 miles "the rottenest stretch of territory in the country."

He also served with the civilian aviation industry in multiple duties such as working on the Hoffman cabin-chute for passenger transport airplanes. Cook's 1926 air race pilot license was signed by friend and cohort Orville Wright. He had a continued affiliation with the Indiana National Guard serving as their air officer. He resigned his Army commission in 1928 to become vice president and general manager of the Curtis Flying Service of Indiana, located in at Stout Army Air Field in Indianapolis.

Cook was a pioneer in bringing Indianapolis its first principal airport, Indianapolis Municipal Airport which opened in Indianapolis in 1931. Construction cost $724,000, and the airport terminal building was completed for $125,000. Later in Indianapolis, he was involved in the development of the first dive bombing sight for the United States Army. He fought for military recognition of the airplanes’ potential and was part of the group of officers who “lost favor” with the Army during the court martial of General Billy Mitchell. Cook served for many years as director and vice president of the American Legion National Aeronautics Commission in Indianapolis and was later the first American Legion National Director of Aviation.

Cook became involved in recognizing the Wright Brothers’ contributions to flying. The Smithsonian did not recognize the brother's flight at “Kitty Hawk” in 1903 as the first powered aircraft flight. Due to his dogged determination, the flight was eventually officially recognized in 1940 as the first powered flight. Weir Cook was a member of the Indianapolis Chamber of Commerce Airport Siting Committee, which picked the site for the Indianapolis airport. The airport opened in 1931 and Cook was the airport's first manager.

== World War II ==
After December 7, 1941, Cook achieved the rank of colonel in the 38th Division of the Indiana Air Guard located in Indianapolis. Early in 1941, after intensely lobbying for an assignment to the front lines, Cook went back into the Army Air Corps service as a procurement officer and became the commander of air bases in New Caledonia. Cook died in New Caledonia on March 24, 1943, in an airplane crash while training young pilots for combat. Colonel Cook left his base, Oua Tom airbase piloting a Bell P-39 Airacobra in order to find and to bomb a reported submarine. While hunting for the submarine, Cook misjudged his altitude because of cloudy weather and struck the side of a mountain (Ouassio Hill) crashing to his death. He is buried at the National Memorial Cemetery of the Pacific in Section O, Grave 440. In his honor, the Indianapolis Municipal Airport was renamed Weir Cook Municipal Airport and in 1944 a Liberty ship was named H. Weir Cook. In 1976, Weir Cook Municipal Airport was renamed Indianapolis International Airport, but due to the outcry by veterans' groups, the newly constructed terminal building of the airport was named after him on October 28, 2008.

== See also ==
- List of World War I flying aces from the United States
