= Hamilton Coolidge =

American World War I flying ace (1895–1918)

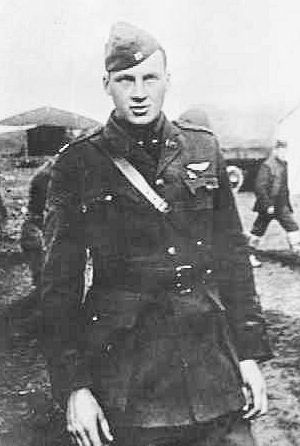
- Captain Hamilton Coolidge 94th Aero Squadron
- Born: September 1, 1895; Brookline, Massachusetts, United States
- Died: October 27, 1918 (aged 23) vicinity of Grandpré, Ardennes, France
- Burial place: vicinity of Grandpré, France
- Military career
- Allegiance: United States
- Branch: Air Service, United States Army
- Service years: 1916–1918
- Rank: Captain
- Nickname: "Ham"
- Unit: Air Service, United States Army: 94th Aero Squadron
- Conflicts: World War I
- Awards: Distinguished Service Cross

Hamilton "Ham" Coolidge (September 1, 1895 – October 27, 1918), was an American pursuit pilot, flying ace in World War I, and recipient of the Distinguished Service Cross.

== Biography ==
Coolidge was a great-great-great grandson of U.S. President Thomas Jefferson and the best friend of Quentin Roosevelt, the youngest son of President Theodore Roosevelt. Ham Coolidge and Quentin Roosevelt attended Groton School together, attended Harvard together, joined the United States Army Air Service and served together with the 1st Pursuit Group in France. They were killed in action within a few months of each other in 1918.

Coolidge dropped out of Harvard College during his sophomore year to join the U.S. Army Air Service. He was one of ten Harvard undergraduates accepted from a field of forty applicants for training at the Curtiss Flying School in Buffalo, New York in July 1916.

A private with the Aviation Section, U.S. Signal Corps, stationed in Miami, Florida when the United States entered the war, Coolidge was sent to the School of Military Aeronautics at the Massachusetts Institute of Technology on June 5, 1917. He embarked for France on July 23, 1917 and was commissioned first lieutenant on September 29, 1917. After serving as a test pilot at Issoudun, he was assigned to the 94th Aero Squadron, commanded by Eddie Rickenbacker, on June 16, 1918. He was promoted to captain on October 3, 1918.

On October 27, 1918, he was killed in action, his SPAD S.XIII taking a direct hit from a German anti-aircraft shell near Grandpré, Ardennes. He had eight confirmed "kills" when he was shot down. Like Quentin Roosevelt, he was posthumously awarded an A.B. (War Degree), Harvard Class of 1919.

Hamilton Coolidge was a great-great-great grandson of U.S. President Thomas Jefferson. His father, J. Randolph Coolidge Jr., was descended from Martha Jefferson Randolph (daughter of the president, who married into the Randolph family of Virginia).

== Legacy ==
Hamilton Coolidge Square, at the intersection of Boston's Cambridge and Charles Streets, is named in his honor.

V. C. Bird International Airport in Antigua was originally named Coolidge Airfield (then Coolidge Air Force Base, then Coolidge International Airport) after him. The village of Coolidge continues to carry his name.

== See also ==
- List of World War I flying aces from the United States

== Bibliography ==
- A brief biography with citations
- Letters of An American Airman: The War Record of Captain Hamilton Coolidge (Boston, 1919)
