= Douglas Campbell (aviator) =

American World War I flying ace

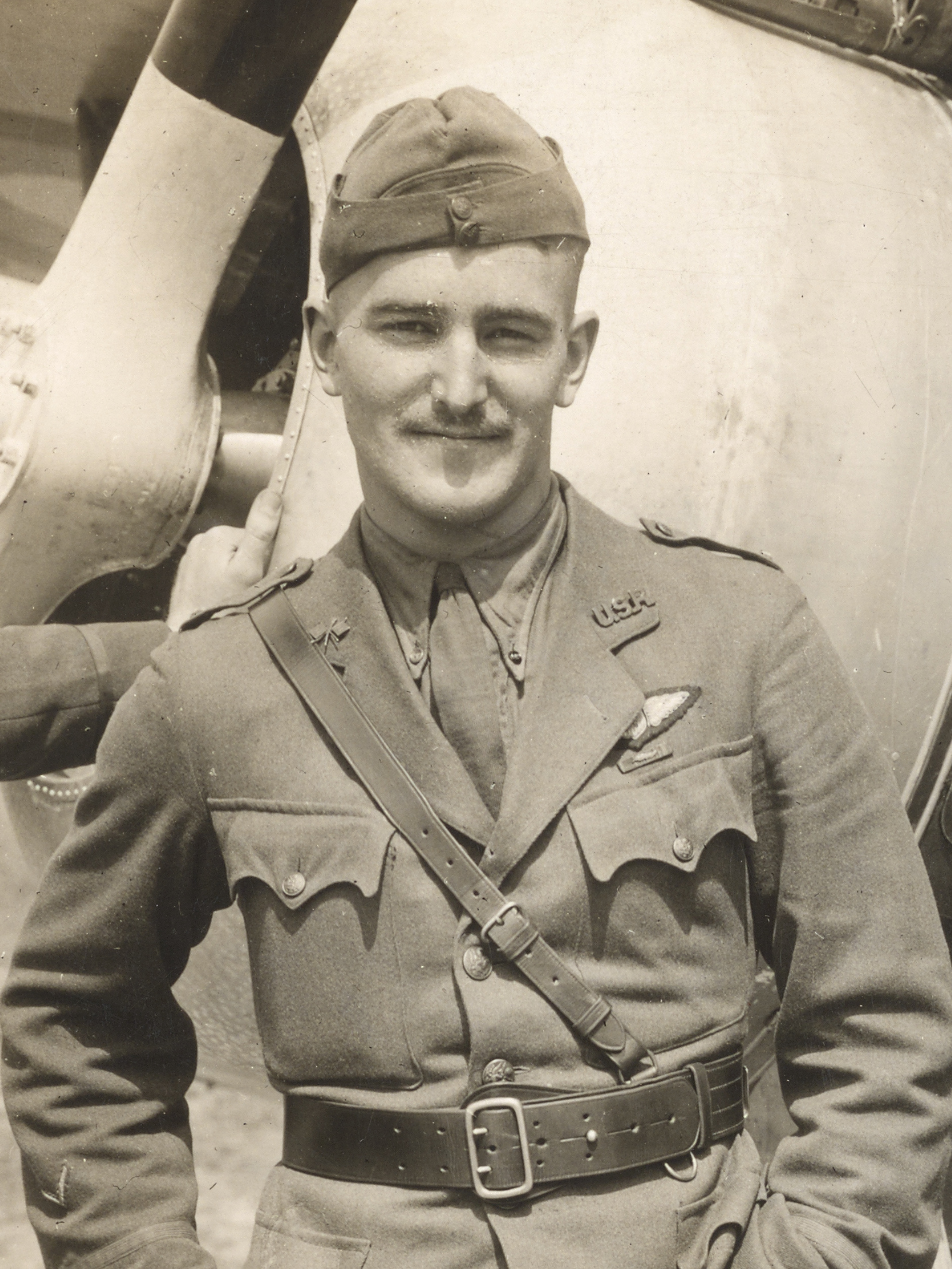
- Lieutenant Douglas Campbell, 94th Aero Squadron
- Born: June 7, 1896; San Francisco, California
- Died: December 16, 1990 (aged 94)
- Military career
- Allegiance: United States
- Branch: Air Service, United States Army
- Service years: 1917–1924
- Rank: Captain
- Unit: Air Service, United States Army: 94th Aero Squadron
- Conflicts: World War I
- Awards: DSC (5); Croix De Guerre

Douglas Campbell (June 7, 1896 – October 16, 1990) was an American aviator and World War I flying ace. He was the first American aviator flying in an American-trained air unit to achieve the status of ace.

== Early life ==
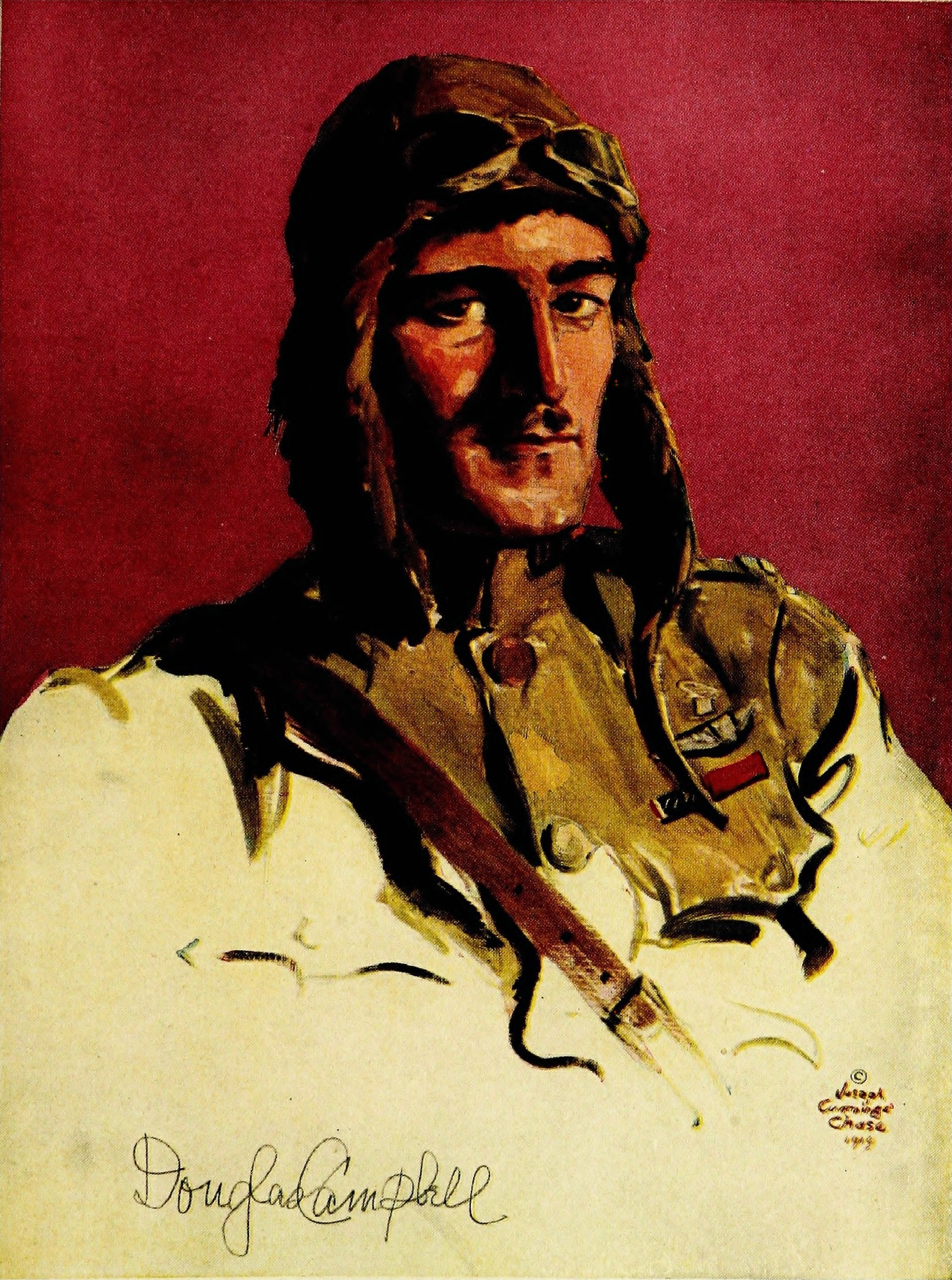
Douglas Campbell portrait in 1920

Campbell was born in San Francisco, California. He was the son of famed astronomer William W. Campbell, the head of the Lick Observatory and future president of the University of California. At the time the United States entered World War I in April 1917, he was a student at Harvard University noted for his athletic prowess. Campbell and close friend Quentin Roosevelt, the son of former President Theodore Roosevelt, immediately dropped out of college and enlisted in the United States Army. He would receive an A.B. Harvard Class of 1917.

== Service career ==
Assigned to the Air Service, Campbell learned to fly in a Curtiss Jenny aircraft and was later trained in a Nieuport fighter. He was assigned to the famous Pursuit 94th Aero Squadron (the "Hat in the ring" gang) - at this stage flying Nieuport 28 fighters. He was noted for several firsts in his service. He flew the squadron's first patrol along with two other famous aviators, Eddie Rickenbacker and Raoul Lufbery. Due to supply problems, the trio flew their first mission in unarmed planes. His first kill came while flying in an aircraft armed with only one rather than the usual two machine guns.

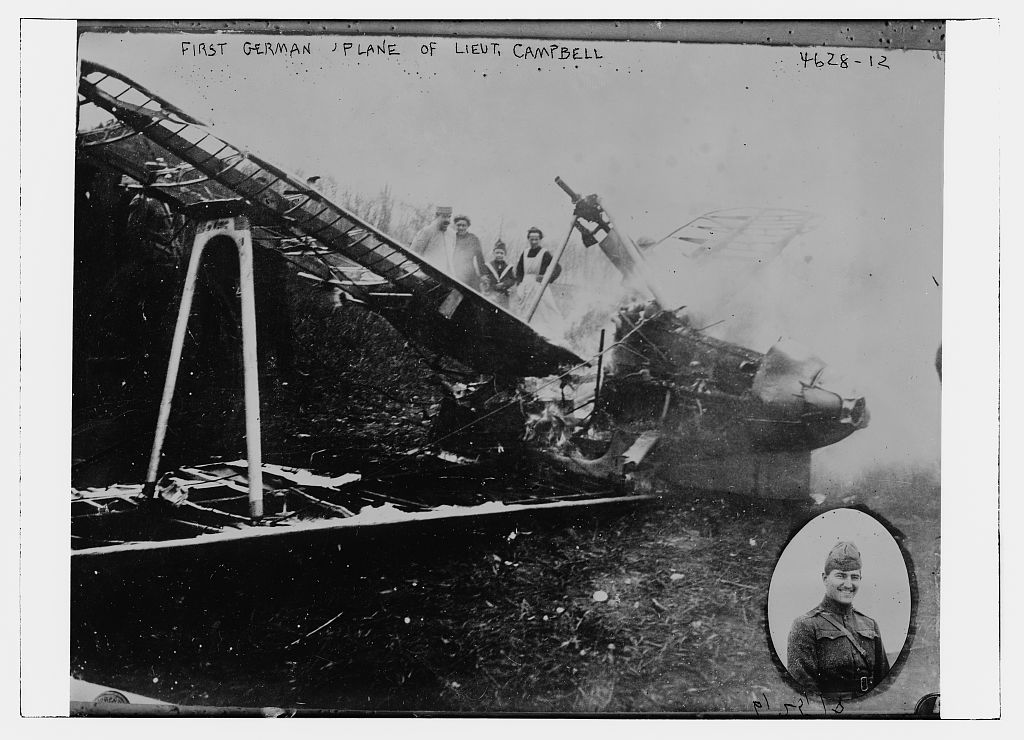
"First German Plane of Lt Campbell"

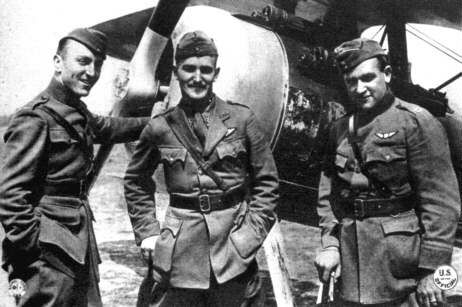
Douglas Campbell (center) poses with fellow 94th Aero Squadron aviators Eddie Rickenbacker (l.) and Kenneth Marr (r.). The aircraft in the background is a Nieuport 28.

He shared credit with Lt. Alan F. Winslow for the squadron's first confirmed victories, which were the first victories by fighter aircraft of an American-trained flying unit in the war. Campbell and Winslow each shot down and captured a pilot from Jasta 64w on April 14, 1918. He became the second Air Service ace and the first by an American-trained aviator when he downed his fifth enemy aircraft over Lironville, France on May 31, 1918.

Campbell was awarded the Distinguished Service Cross for bravery in aerial combat over Flirey, France on May 19, 1918 and in the next 3 weeks received 4 Oak Leaf Clusters. He was also awarded the Croix de Guerre avec palme by the French military. He scored his sixth and final victory on June 5, 1918.

During this last action, Campbell was wounded by an exploding artillery shell and was sent back to the United States to recover from severe shrapnel injuries to his back. During his recuperation, he made appearances at numerous war bond rallies. Campbell hoped to return to combat and was reassigned to his squadron in November 1918. By then however the war was winding down and he saw no further frontline action before the Armistice of November 11, 1918. While leaving active service the following year, he continued to hold a commission in the reserves until 1924.

After the war, he took a job for W.R. Grace and Company. Douglas Campbell began work in April 1919 in New York. Two years later he arrived at the Hacienda Cartavio in Peru where he worked as an accountant. Cartavio was a farm where sugarcane was grown and where W. R. Grace & Co. had built the first mill to produce sugar at the end of the nineteenth century. He worked for about eleven years there. After he became the Vice-President of Pan-American Airways in 1939 and was named the airline's general manager in 1948. He died in Greenwich, Connecticut at the age of 94.

== Awards and decorations ==
Campbell's awards include:

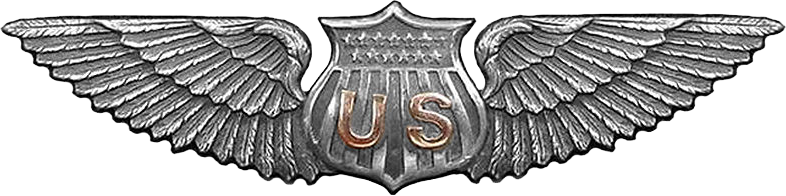

Badge	World War I Aviator Badge		
1st Row	Distinguished Service Cross with 4 Oak leaf clusters (5 awards)	Purple Heart	World War I Victory Medal
2nd Row	Army of Occupation of Germany Medal	French Legion of Honour; Chevalier	French Croix de Guerre for World War I service

== See also ==
- List of World War I flying aces from the United States
- Paul Frank Baer
- Kiffin Rockwell - First American pilot, flying for the French, to shot down an enemy plane in 1916

== Bibliography ==
- Let's Go Where the Action Is! The Wartime Experiences of Douglas Campbell; Douglas Campbell, Jack Eder (ed); Jaare Publisher; 1984; ASIN B0006EHDQY
- Fighting the Flying Circus; Eddie Rickenbacker; Time-Life Books; 1990; ISBN 0-8094-7955-9
- Nieuport Aces of World War 1. Norman Franks. Osprey Publishing, 2000. ISBN 1-85532-961-1, ISBN 978-1-85532-961-4.
- W. R. Grace & Co. Los años formativos 1850 - 1930; Lawrence A. Clayton; Asociación de Historia Marítima y Naval Iberoamericana; 2008; ISBN 978-9972-877-07-0
