= Zenos Ramsey Miller =

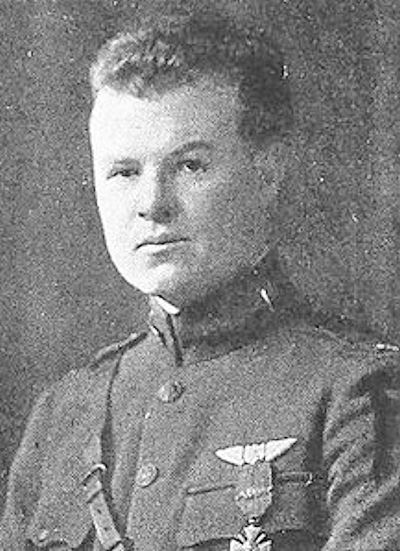
- Lieutenant Zenos Ramsey Miller, 27th Aero Squadron
- Born: September 13, 1896
- Died: July 22, 1922 (aged 26)
- Burial place: Elvaston Cemetery, Elvaston, Hancock County, Illinois
- Military career
- Allegiance: United States
- Branch: Air Service, United States Army
- Unit: 27th Aero Squadron
- Conflicts: World War I

Zenos Ramsey Miller (13 September 1895 – 22 July 1922) was an American pursuit pilot and flying ace in World War I.

== Biography ==
Born in Pao Ting Fu, China, Miller joined the Air Service, United States Army in 1917 during World War I. After pilot training in the United States, Lieutenant Miller was assigned to the 27th Aero Squadron, 1st Pursuit Group, First Army Air Service on 24 November 1917. Scoring his first two victories on the afternoon and evening of 16 July 1918, Miller shot down an enemy balloon over Gland and later forced down a second balloon while dogfighting three Fokkers. He scored a third victory shooting down a Fokker D.VII on 19 July.

During his tour of duty, he accidentally decapitated a French worker who had been cutting the grass at Toul (Gengault Aerodrome) as part of a botched landing. In a separate incident, he accidentally set fire to his own aircraft, destroying both the plane and the canvas hangar housing it.

On 20 July 1918 he shot down two enemy aircraft while on a combat patrol, bringing his total number of confirmed kills to five, qualifying him for the title of "air ace". However, the patrol ran into severe weather which caused his aircraft and two other SPAD S.XIIIs to crash inside enemy territory; the pilots of the other two planes were killed and Miller was made a prisoner of war.

After the war he was demobilized and studied at Princeton University to become a doctor. In 1921, a friend of his, Dr. Clarence Gamble, had purchased an old Savoia-Marchetti plane and was attempting to make a transcontinental flight from Boston to Pasadena, California. On 22 July 1922, shortly before the flight was scheduled to begin, Miller, his brother Ralph, and Gamble were flying over Boston when the aircraft went into a spin and crashed into a swamp near Framingham, Massachusetts, killing Miller.

== See also ==
- List of World War I flying aces from the United States
