= 27th Aero Squadron =

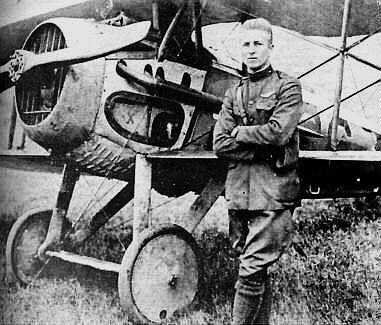
- Lt. Frank Luke Jr. with his SPAD XIII at Rembercourt Airdrome, France, on 19 September 1918
- Active: 15 June 1917 – 14 March 1921
- Country: United States
- Branch: United States Army Air Service
- Type: Squadron
- Role: Pursuit
- Part of: American Expeditionary Forces (AEF)
- Fuselage Code: "American Eagle"
- Engagements: World War I

Commanders
- Notable commanders: Maj. Harold E. Hartney; Capt. Alfred S. Grant

Insignia
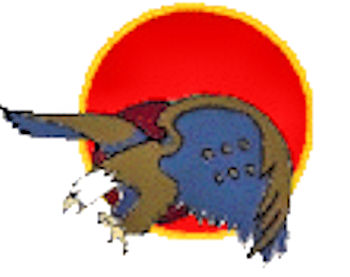
- 27th Aero Squadron Emblem

Aircraft flown
- Fighter: Sopwith F-1 Camel, 1918; Nieuport 28, 1918; Spad XIII, 1918–1919
- Trainer: Curtiss JN-4, 1917–1918

Service record
- Operations: 1st Pursuit Group; Western Front, France: 29 May-11 November 1918
- Victories: Enemy Aircraft shot down: 33; Enemy Balloons shot down: 21; Total Enemy Aircraft Destroyed: 54; Air Aces: 6: Lt. Col. Harold E. Hartney, 1** ** Hartney had a total of 7 aerial victories, 6 with the 20th Aero Squadron (all shared), 1 probable with the 185th Aero Squadron and 1 with the 27th Aero Squadron; Lt. Donald Hudson, 6 (5 shared); Lt. Frank Luke Jr., 18, (14 balloons, 4 shared); Lt John K. MacArthur, 6 (3 shared); Lt Zenos R. Miller, 5; Capt. Jerry C. Vasconcells, 6 (5 balloons, 3 shared); Lt. Joseph F. Wehner, (3 shared)

The 27th Aero Squadron was a United States Army Air Service unit that fought on the Western Front during World War I.

The squadron was assigned as a Day Pursuit (Fighter) Squadron as part of the 1st Pursuit Group, First United States Army. Its mission was to engage and clear enemy aircraft from the skies and provide escort to reconnaissance and bombardment squadrons over enemy territory. It also attacked enemy observation balloons, and perform close air support and tactical bombing attacks of enemy forces along the front lines.

After the 1918 Armistice with Germany, the squadron returned to the United States in June 1919 and became part of the permanent United States Army Air Service in 1921, being re-designated as the 27th Squadron (Pursuit).

The current United States Air Force unit which holds its lineage and history is the 27th Fighter Squadron, assigned to the 1st Operations Group, Joint Base Langley–Eustis, Virginia.

== History ==
=== Origins ===
The 27th was initially formed as Company K, 3d Provisional Aero Squadron on 8 May 1917 at Kelly Field, Texas. On 15 June, Company K was re-designated as the 21st Aero Squadron. However, another 21st had been organized at Rockwell Field, California and on 23 June, the squadron was re-chartered as the 27th Aero Squadron. As Company "K", and later as the 27th, the squadron was initiated into the Army with close order drill, along with the labor of clearing cactus from the grounds of Kelly Field #2, and erecting a tent city, enduring the hazards of snakes and inclement weather according to the squadron historian at the time.

On 19 August, the 27th was sent by train from San Antonio, Texas to Toronto, Ontario, Canada, where the squadron would receive training under the auspices of the Royal Flying Corps. Arriving at Leaside, initially the squadron continued basic indoctrination training until 5 September when it was separated into training Flights. The flights were classified by skills and ability. Training continued at various locations in the Toronto area until the end of October, when the squadron was sent to Fort Worth, Texas, and assigned to Hicks Field on the 22d where it received flight training on the Curtiss JN-4D trainer.

It relieved orders for overseas service and departed Hicks Field on 23 January 1918, arriving at the Aviation Concentration Depot, Garden City, New York on the 26th. Unfortunately, a rash of scarlet fever infected many squadron personnel, and about 60 men were transferred out of the squadron to be medically quarantined. After being delayed for about a month, the 27th boarded a troop ship and departed from New York Harbor on 26 February, arriving at Liverpool, England on 5 March. A train took the squadron to a Rest Camp at Winchester the same day. The squadron waited until 17 March before crossing the English Channel and arriving in Le Havre, France on the 18th.

=== Arrival in France ===
After a train journey in French "Cattle Cars", the squadron arrived at Air Service Headquarters, AEF, at Tours Aerodrome on 20 March. There for the next week, the men received their barracks bags, which they had not had since arriving in Liverpool on the 5th. Also, they were quartered in wooden barracks and were able to relax for about a week. During this time, the 27th Aero Squadron was classified as a Pursuit squadron, and was ordered to the 3d Air Instructional Center at Issoudun Aerodrome, at which they arrived on 29 March. There, the squadron was separated into air and ground flights, the pilots receiving advanced combat training Sopwith F-1 Camels and on the Nieuport 28 aircraft the squadron was to be assigned. Also the men were assigned to aircraft mechanics and other support duties.

Remaining at Issoudun until 24 April, the squadron moved up into the "Zone of Advance", or the Western Front, at Epiez Aerodrome. There, the squadron joined with the 94th, 95th and 147th squadrons, and received Nieuport 28s that were ferried from Orly Field, near Paris. At Epiz, being near the front lines, the squadron continued with practice formations and an occasional alert when enemy aircraft were seen or rumored to be in the vicinity. On 31 May, the 27th and the 147th squadrons moved to the Croix de Metz Aerodrome, near Toul. There the squadrons re-joined with the 94th and 95th which were already operating over the front along with part of the French 122d Escadrille. There, the four AEF squadrons were formally organized into the 1st Pursuit Group on 1 June.

=== Toul Sector operations ===
On 2 June 1918, the 27th Aero Squadron entered into combat operations. The first patrol was uneventful, and it accomplished its objective. Many in the squadron were rather surprised as there has been nothing exciting, that the pock-marked lines seemed so quiet, and no Germans were in the air. The fact was that we failed to realize the danger, but that was soon to change. Over the next several days the squadron began a routine of three scheduled patrols, lasting about an hour each, and then three or four voluntary patrols each day. On 4 June, the squadron performed seven patrols with the object of keeping enemy observation photographers from coming over. The squadron engaged in combat with the German Air Force on several patrols, and on 13 June, Lt Plyler was reported missing after being shot down in a combat with German planes, and later was reported to be a prisoner. In the days that followed, saw a continence of these same types of patrols. On 25 June, orders came to be ready to move to the Chateau Thierry Sector.

=== Chateau Thierry Sector operations ===
The squadron moved to Touquin Aerodrome on 28 June, and on the 30th began flying reconnaissance patrols along the sector to familiarize themselves with the new sector. These patrols were staggered throughout the day, each one going deeper into enemy territory. The squadron did not encounter any enemy aircraft, however anti-aircraft artillery fire was accurate and active. On 2 July, the squadron engaged in aerial combat with Jagdgeschwader 1, the famous "Richthofen Circus" and eight squadron aircraft were in combat for thirty-five minutes. Four enemy Fokker D.VIII were shot down, with two squadron pilots being reported as missing.

Through mid-July, the squadron carried out escort patrols for photographic observation aircraft, primarily from the 91st and 88th Aero Squadrons. On 9 July, a group of Royal Air Force planes joined the Air Service in the sector. With the addition of the RAF planes, Allied aircraft were concentrated on attacking German infantry formations whenever they tried to make an advance.

On the 15th, the full Allied offensive in the sector began, with operations ongoing from dawn until nightfall. The 27th encountered German formations as large as 30 aircraft. On the 16th the Germans crossed the Marne River at Dormans, however the American infantry outflanked the Germans and were able to hold the line. During the offensive, the 27th continued escort flights of photo-reconnaissance planes so headquarters would be able to know the locations and strength of the enemy forces. By the 29th the Nieuport 28s began to be replaced with Spad XIIIs.

=== St. Mihiel Offensive ===
By 1 September, the front had moved considerably and preparations were being made to move up closer to the line. A move to Rembercourt Aerodrome was made on 3 September and operations began the next day. In order to keep the squadron operations secret from the Germans, it was necessary to keep aircraft in the air in the vicinity of Rembercourt to guard against their photographic planes. The American offensive began on 12 September after an intense artillery barrage, and the 27th was ordered to conduct close air support for the infantry and machine-gun enemy infantry on the ground; protect observation aircraft and take the offensive to enemy pursuit planes spotted in the sector. In addition, all enemy observation balloons were to be attacked.

However, on account of weather conditions, flights were limited to about 200 meters in altitude, with patrols primarily supporting the infantry advance and to attack enemy convoys and troop concentrations in its rear areas. However, after a few days, the weather improved and the squadron was able to operate from as high as 5,500 meters.

=== Meuse-Argonne Offensive ===
Almost immediately after the completion of the St. Mihiel offensive that the group began preparing for a drive in the Verdun area. On the night of 25 September, the heaviest American artillery barrage of the war was laid down on the enemy front. Operations orders received stated that all available aircraft would leave the ground before dawn to attack and destroy all enemy observation balloons. After that aircraft would attack enemy troops on the ground and engage any enemy aircraft to prevent them attacking friendly infantry forces.

The 27th successfully brought down four enemy balloons, and an advance flight also moved forward to an airdrome west of Verdun. It was at this time, the actions of Lt. Frank Luke were at their height. Each day, he attacked balloons at dawn and dusk and in one instance he shot down three balloons in less than 10 minutes time. In addition to the balloons, he also shot down an enemy biplane and a Fokker. However, on 28 September he was reported missing, and unfortunately was confirmed to be killed about a month later.

Operations were mainly at altitudes of less than 600 meters primarily to attack any enemy aircraft flying to attack American ground forces. Fifteen enemy aircraft were shot down by the 27th during this period. During the closing days of the war, reports indicated that enemy activity had dwindled to a great extent. Only a few biplanes and an occasional enemy formation of aircraft were seen.

Hostilities ended on 10 November, as unfavorable weather caused the squadron to be grounded on the morning of 11 November.

=== Demobilization ===
Proficiency flights were conducted after the Armistice with Germany, however, no flights were permitted to be flown over German-controlled territory. The squadron remained at Rembercourt for about a month. On 5 December 1918 orders were received from First Army for the squadron to report to the 1st Air Depot, Colombey-les-Belles Airdrome to turn in all of its supplies and equipment and was relieved from duty with the AEF. The squadron's SPAD aircraft were delivered to the Air Service American Air Service Acceptance Park No. 1 at Orly Aerodrome to be returned to the French. There practically all of the pilots and observers were detached from the squadron. During the organization's stay at Colombey, the men attended to the usual camp duties.

Personnel at Colombey were subsequently assigned to the commanding general, services of supply, and ordered to report to one of several staging camps in France. There, personnel awaited scheduling to report to one of the Base Ports in France for transport to the United States and subsequent demobilization. On 2 February 1919, the 27th was moved to Base Station #5 near the port of Brest prior to its return to the United States. Upon arrival the men were caught up on any back pay owed to them, de-loused, a formal military records review was performed and a passenger list was created prior to the men boarding a ship.

On 5 March 1919, the 27th Aero Squadron boarded the USS Charleston and sailed for New York Harbor, arriving approximately 18 March. It proceeded to Garden City, where most of the personnel of the squadron were demobilized and returned to civilian life.

=== Lineage ===
- Formed as: Company K, 3d Provisional Aero Squadron on 8 May 1917
- Organized as 21st Aero Squadron on 15 June 1917

Re-designated as: 27th Aero Squadron on 23 June 1917
Re-designated as: 27th Aero Squadron (Pursuit), on 20 March 1918
Re-designated as: 27th Aero Squadron on 19 March 1919
Re-designated as: 27th Squadron (Pursuit) on 14 March 1921

=== Assignments ===
- Post Headquarters, Kelly Field, 8 May 1917
- Aviation Section, U.S. Signal Corps

Attached to the Royal Flying Corps for training, 18 August 1917 – 26 January 1918

- Aviation Concentration Center, 26 January – 25 February 1918
- Air Service Headquarters, AEF, 20 March 1918
- 3d Air Instructional Center, 29 March 1918
- Air Service Headquarters, AEF, British Isles, 5–20 March 1918
- Headquarters, Chief of Air Service, AEF, 24 April 1918
- 1st Pursuit Group, 1 June 1918
- 1st Air Depot, 12 December 1918
- Commanding General, Services of Supply, 5 February – 8 March 1919
- Eastern Department, 19 March 1919

=== Stations ===
- Kelly Field, Texas, 15 June 1917
- Camp Leeside, Toronto, Ontario, Canada, 18 August 1917

Detachments at various Canadian stations, 5 Sep – 22 October 1917

- Hicks Field (Camp Taliaferro Field #1), Texas, 29 October 1917
- Aviation Concentration Center, Garden City, New York, 26 Jan – 25 February 1918
- Port of Entry, Hoboken, New Jersey

Overseas transport: 26 February – 5 March 1918

- Liverpool, England, 5 March 1918
- Winchester, England, 6 March 1918
- Tours Aerodrome, France, 20 March 1918
- Issoudun Aerodrome, France, 29 March 1918
- Epiez Aerodrome, France, 24 April 1918
- Croix de Metz Aerodrome (Toul), France, 1 June 1918
- Touquin Aerodrome, France, 28 June 1918
- Saints Aerodrome, France, 9 July 1918
- Rembercourt Aerodrome, France, 3 September 1918

Flight operated from un aerodrome in the Verdun area, 25 September 1918 – unknown

- Colombey-les-Belles Airdrome, France, 12 December 1918
- Brest, France, 5 Feb – 8 March 1919
- Mitchel Field, New York, 19 March 1919

=== Combat sectors and campaigns ===
Streamer	Sector/Campaign	Dates	Notes
	Toul Sector	2–25 June 1918, 1–11 September 1918	
	Aisne-Marne Sector	30 June – 14 July 1918	
	Champagne-Marne Defensive Campaign	15–18 July 1918	
	Aisne-Marne Offensive Campaign	18 July-6 August 1918.	
	Vesle Sector	7–29 August 1918	
	St. Mihiel Offensive Campaign	12–16 September 1918	
	Verdun Sector	17–25 September 1918	
	Meuse-Argonne Offensive Campaign	26 September – 11 November 1918	

=== Notable personnel ===
- Lt. Frank Luke Jr., Medal of Honor, DSC (2x), Air Ace, (KIA)
- Cpt. Jerry Cox Vasconcells, 6 aerial victories, two balloons

- Lt. Oliver T. Beauchamp, KIA
- Lt. Kenneth S. Clapp, DSC, 2 aerial victories
- Lt. Leslie B. Cooper, SSC
- Lt. W.B. Cunn, MIA
- Lt. Leo H. Dawson, SSC, 3 aerial victories, 1 balloon
- Lt. Edward Elliot, MIA
- Lt. W. H. Flyer, POW
- Lt. William F. Frank, DSC, 1 aerial victory, (KIA)
- Cpt. Alfred A. Grant, DSC, 4 aerial victories
- Lt. Malcolm Gunn, MIA
- Maj. Harold E. Hartney, DSC, SSC
- Lt. William J. Hoover, DSC, 3 aerial victories
- Lt. Donald Hudson, DSC, 6 aerial victories, Air Ace
- Lt. J.S. Hunt, (KIA)
- Lt. Thomas F. Lennon, SSC
- Lt. Frederick E. Little, 5+ aerial victory (World War I Ace)
- Lt. C. A. McElvain, POW
- Lt. John K. MacArthur, DSC, air ace, (KIA)
- Lt. R.C. Martin, POW
- Lt. Zenos R. Miller, SSC, POW
- Lt. R. V. Navius, (KIA)
- Lt. Fred W. Norton, DSC, (KIA)
- Lt. Robert F. Raymond, DSC, POW, 1 aerial victory
- Lt. I. A. Roberts, MIA
- Lt. Edward Rucker, DSC, 1 aerial victory
- Lt. C. R. Sands, MIA
- Lt. Penrose V. Stout, DSC
- Lt. W. B. Wanamaker, POW
- Lt. Joseph F. Wehner, DSC (2x), air ace, (KIA)
- Lt. S. W. White, (KIA)
- Lt. A. L. Whiton, MIA

DSC: Distinguished Service Cross; SSC: Silver Star Citation; KIA: Killed in Action; MIA: Missing in Action; POW: Prisoner of War

== See also ==
- Organization of the Air Service of the American Expeditionary Force
- List of American aero squadrons
