= Edward Rucker =

U.S. Army aviator

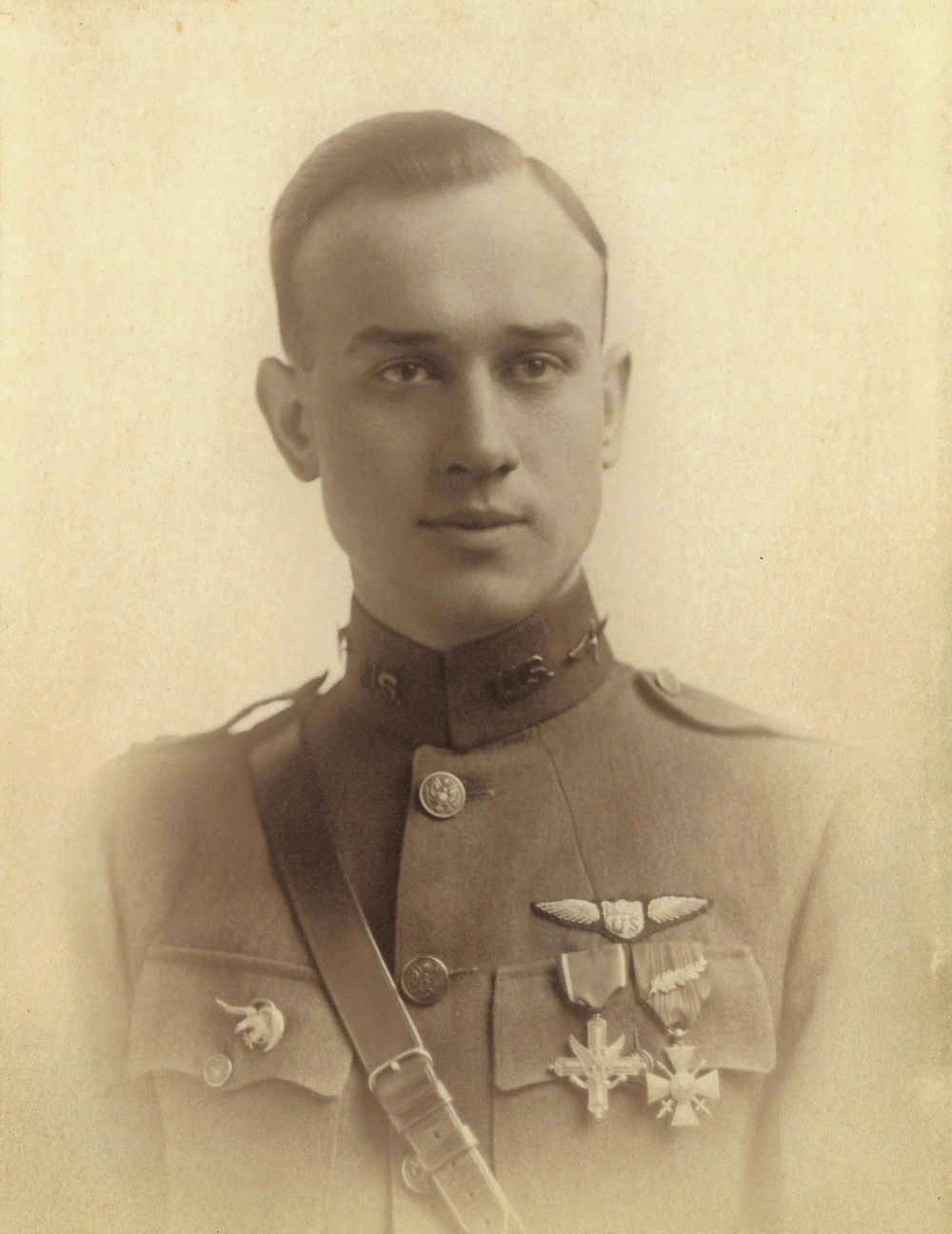
- Born: Edward Walter Rucker Jr. March 20, 1894; Bosworth, Missouri, US
- Died: March 23, 1945 (aged 51); Fayette, Missouri, US
- Burial place: Walnut Ridge Cemetery
- Military career
- Allegiance: United States
- Branch: United States Army
- Service years: 1915–1918
- Rank: Captain
- Units: 27th Aero Squadron, 1st Pursuit Group
- Conflict: World War I
- Awards: Distinguished Service Cross; Croix de Guerre with palm

Edward Walter Rucker Jr. (March 20, 1894 – March 23, 1945), was an U.S. Army aviator during World War I who earned the Distinguished Service Cross in the skies over Europe as part of the 27th Aero Squadron.

Rucker was born in Bosworth, Missouri on March 20, 1894 to Edward Rucker, Sr. and Mary Thomas Guillet. Rucker attended college and became a high school principal in 1914 in Lebannon, Mo. and in 1916 Superintendent of Schools in Platte City, Mo. He joined the National Guard in 1915 and when his company was federalized he was a Corporal having served at the US-Mexico border from July 1916-February 1917.

In 1917, Rucker attended officer's training and was made a provisional 2nd Lieutenant, but chose flight school in Toronto, Mo. and gunnery school in Texas.

He shipped out to France with the 27th Aero Squadron, 1st Pursuit Group in 1918 as a 1st Lieutenant.

In June 1918, Rucker and three fellow pilots engaged with enemy aircraft following an attack on three American reconnaissance planes, and Rucker engaged in single-handed combat with four enemy combatants.

Captain Rucker was awarded the Distinguished Service Cross on 11 December 1918 as well as the French Croix de Guerre with palm.

In 1920 he married Mabel Elmore Davidson. They moved to Buffalo, New York until the early 1940s when they moved to Fayette, Missouri until his death on March 23, 1945.

In June 2025 it was announced that Fort Novosel, originally named Fort Rucker after Confederate general Edmund Rucker, would be renamed again as Fort Rucker, this time after Captain Rucker.
