= Harold Evans Hartney =

Canadian World War I flying ace

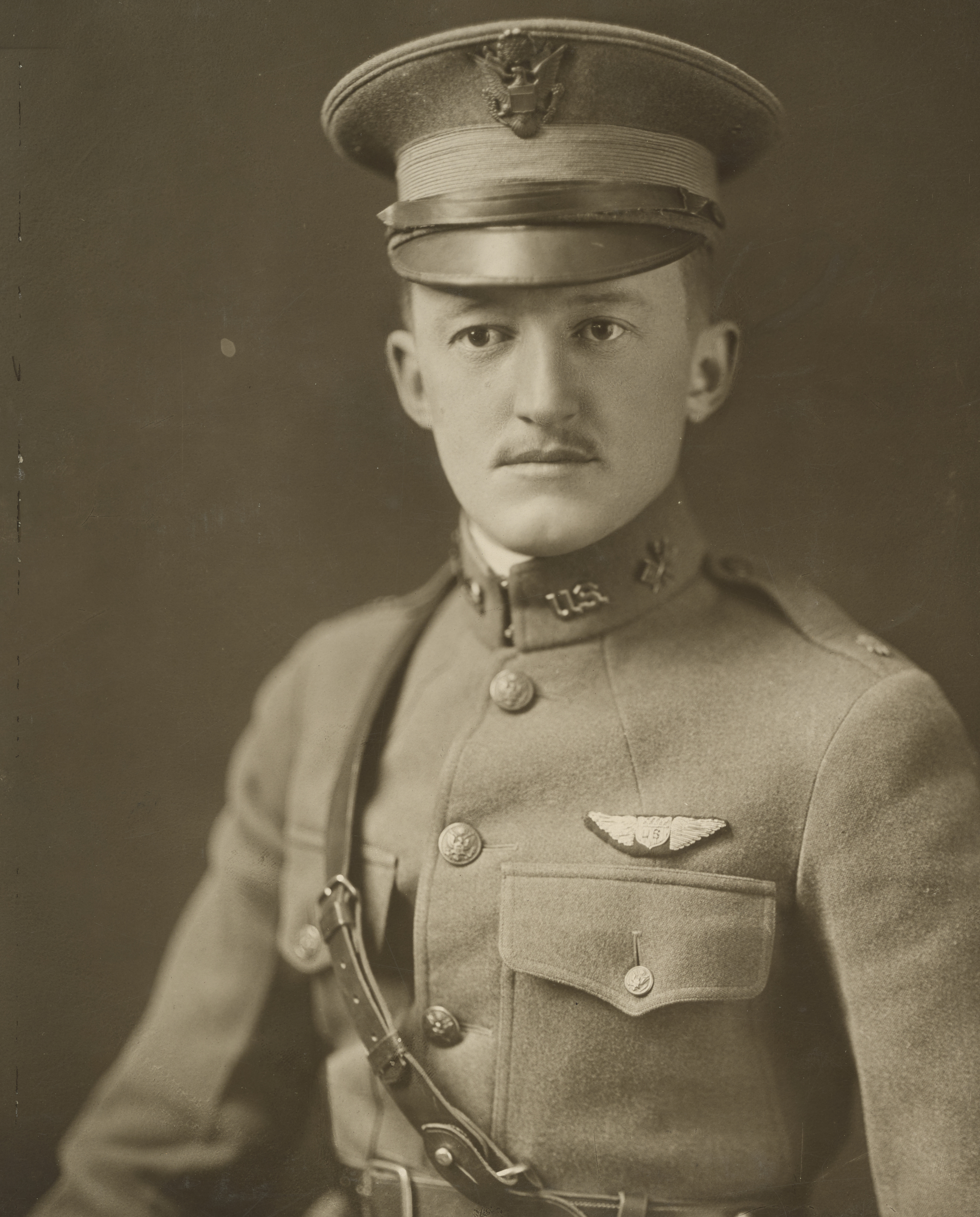
- Portrait of Hartney
- Born: April 19, 1888; Pakenham, Ontario, Canada
- Died: October 5, 1945 (aged 57); Washington, D.C., U.S.
- Military career
- Allegiance: British Empire; United States
- Branch: Canadian NPAM; Canadian Expeditionary Force; Royal Flying Corps(United Kingdom); Air Service, United States Army
- Service years: 1914–1915 (Canada); 1915–1917 (UK); 1917–1918 (USA)
- Rank: Lieutenant Colonel
- Units: Canadian NPAM: 105th Saskatoon Fusiliers; Canadian Expeditionary Force: 28th (Northwest) Battalion; Royal Flying Corps: No. 20 Squadron RFC; Air Service, United States Army: 27th Aero Squadron; 1st Pursuit Group
- Commands: 27th Aero Squadron; 1st Pursuit Group
- Conflicts: World War I
- Awards: American Distinguished Service Cross, French Legion d'Honneur and Croix de Guerre, Italian Silver Medal of Military Valor

Harold Evans Hartney (April 19, 1888 – October 5, 1945) was a Canadian-born World War I flying ace who served in the Royal Flying Corps and then in the United States Army Air Service, credited with seven confirmed and one unconfirmed aerial victories.

== Early life and service ==
Hartney graduated from University of Toronto in 1911 and worked in his brother's law office in Saskatoon. After earning a graduate degree at the University of Saskatchewan, he became a barrister. He joined the Saskatoon Fusiliers, and played cornet in the town band. He married in 1914, just prior to World War I's start.

On 28 October 1914, Hartney enlisted in the Canadian Expeditionary Force. His Attestation Paper, filled out for his entry at Saskatoon, gives his height as 5 feet 9½ inches, his complexion as fair, and hair and eyes as brown. His next of kin is given as Irene McCeary Hartney, care of Russell Hartney. Harold Hartney claimed three years prior service as a lieutenant in the Harbord Cadets and as a trumpeter bandsman in the 48th Highlanders.

After he shipped out to England with the 28th Battalion C.E.F.in May 1915, he visited an aerodrome at Folkestone while training nearby on Dibgate Plains and crossed paths with fellow Canadian Billy Bishop. That incidental meeting at Folkestone Aerodrome steered Hartney to the Royal Flying Corps. On 21 October 1915, he transferred to the RFC.

== Flying service ==
By the beginning of the Somme Offensive, Hartney had been assigned to 20 Squadron as a Royal Aircraft Factory FE.2d pilot. On 1 July 1916, while flying over the developing ground attack, Hartney found himself under fire from a Fokker E.III. Hartney smacked his gunner alert, sideslipped from danger, and racked his Royal Aircraft Factory FE.2d into an Immelmann turn. He came out slightly above the German, who was now in a head-on firing pass. Hartney's gunner fired five four-round bursts. Hartney's recollection was, "His tank ablaze, he pulled up almost directly in front of us, then whip-stalled to Eternity." Despite the flames, Hartney was credited with an "out of control" victory.

On the way home, Hartney and his gunner got into eleven more skirmishes, clearing three incidental machine gun jams. In one skirmish, they tailed another German and sent him down in a smoking plunge to earth for what was officially another "out of control" win. By the time the FE.2d landed, the gunner had run one gun dry; the other was jammed. The plane was a bullet-riddled wreck, trailing torn fabric. Seven bullets stuck in the engine's water jacket bled off its coolant, and the engine "froze", with four of its Rolls-Royce pistons sticking to their cylinder walls. Tattered streamers of fabric torn by bullets trailed from the biplane. Somehow, the crew was uninjured.

Hartney would not score again until 20 October. He then took leave before returning to the fray as 'A' Flight Commander. On 2 February, flying his ninth assigned aircraft in eight months duty, Hartney destroyed a Halberstadt D.II over Lille. Twelve days later, Hartney was tasked with a photographic reconnaissance mission near Passchendaele. With observer W. T. Jourdan aboard, and escorted by another FE.2, Hartney found himself under attack by seven German Albatros D.III fighter planes. Then, as Hartney later wrote, "...the right rear enemy ship...took a swoop at us. His tracer bullets were playing about us for fully two seconds before Jourdan finally let him have both guns right in the face. The poor brave kid just kept on going, for all the world like a mortally wounded bird plummeting to his death near a river bend below us." This victory was Hartney's fifth, making him an ace.

The FE.2 escort's observer also downed an Albatros, while Jourdan accounted for another; one German fell aflame, the other fell in a slow spinning dive. The escort then broke up under fire from a single Albatros; the British observer was killed in action, and the pilot wounded. Hartney attempted to battle the attacker, only to discover that his own FE.2 suffered from a snapped-off propeller blade and broken flying wires and was incapable of fighting. The Canadian ace had to shut down the engine and dead-stick to a crashlanding in a Belgian field picketed with hop poles. After impact, he found himself lying under the 775 pounds of the FE.2's engine. Australian troops trying to lift it free dropped it back on him.

Hartney eventually was hospitalized beside his observer. By one source they were victims of Paul Strähle of Jasta 18, who had scored the first of his 14 victories. Another source credits Baron Manfred von Richthofen with the shoot-down.

After recuperating, Hartney was transferred to the U.S. Air Service. How and why this happened is somewhat unclear. He had been sent to Gosport by the RFC to command a flight. On September 21, 1917 - almost immediately after arriving at Gosport - Hartney received a telegram ordering him to ". . . REPORT TO COLONEL ROSCOE AT TORONTO, CANADA, TO COMMAND 27TH AMERICAN AERO SQUADRON WITH RANK FROM THIS DATE OF MAJOR, SIGNAL CORPS, UNITED STATES ARMY." Hartney later described this order as "a bolt from the blue", that "nearly bowled me over" and that was "unexpected." At this point, he was not even a U.S. citizen. After Hartney reached Canada and reported to Colonel Roscoe in Toronto in late-October, inquiries were made of Washington and Hartney was promptly assured that he in fact had been granted U.S. citizenship; at least one authority agrees that Hartney did receive American citizenship in October 1917, but another reports that Hartney did not become a U.S. citizenship until 1923. Earlier, he (like some other RFC pilots) had signed a card stating that he was willing to go to the U.S. to instruct American fliers. Other than this, Hartney did not recall anything that may have been responsible for his sudden and unexpected, but (to him) exciting, transfer to the U.S. Air Service. It is known, however, that Hartney's transfer was pursuant to an agreement the RFC had previously made with the U.S. Air Service, to release to the U.S. some Americans who were serving in the RFC; the purpose of this was to provide experienced, battle-hardened leaders for U.S. air squadrons that were preparing to go to overseas. Hartney was one of five RFC pilots transferred, at about the same time, under the agreement. Two of these five, including Hartney, were Canadian. Why Hartney, a Canadian, was transferred to the U.S. Air Service remains a mystery.

On February 2, 1918, Hartney received Silver Medal of Military Valor numbered 26, following the next:

His Majesty the King, by his Decree of February 2, 1918, in accordance with the Royal Decree of March 26, 1883, of his own Nation: has awarded the Silver Medal for Military Valor to Captain Harold Evans Hartney (General list and R.F.C. 2nd Army, English Army)

— King of Italy,

He scored his last win for them on 25 June 1918, while in the 27th Pursuit Squadron, although he went on to an unconfirmed triumph over a Gotha while with the 185th Aero Squadron. Hartney commanded both the 27th Pursuit Squadron and its parent organization, the 1st Pursuit Group.

Harold Hartney ended the war as a lieutenant colonel in the Air Service, leading to some confusion as to his nationality. He resigned from the Air Service in 1921 but maintained his rank as a Reserve officer.

== Postwar ==
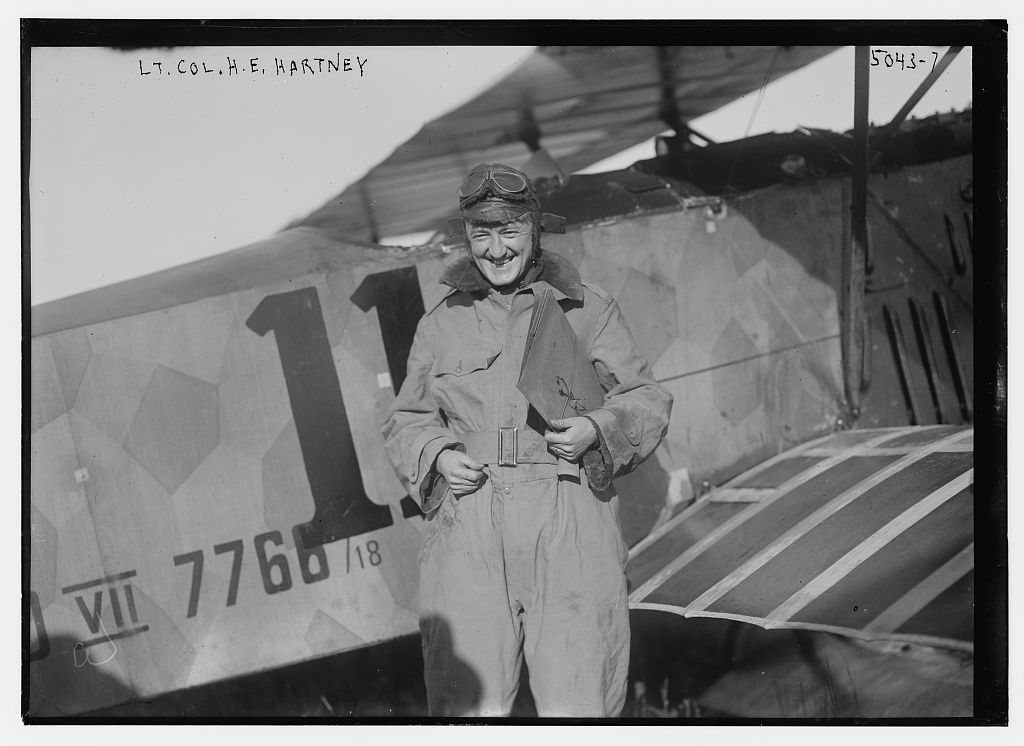
Hartney in 1919 in his Fokker D.VII at the 1919 Transcontinental Air Race

Hartney was awarded the American Distinguished Service Cross in 1919; ironically, the award citation did not mention his aerial victories. Instead, he was cited for a photo reconnaissance mission on 13 August 1918. He became a member of the bar of the District of Columbia and was a practicing attorney there for several years before becoming a journalist. In 1937, Colonel Hartney served on the board investigating the destruction of the airship Hindenburg.

October 8, 1919 he, ranking as Lieutenant Colonel and flying British SE-5A first and German Fokker later, took part at "Transcontinental Aerial Derby" still lasted on October, 15th.

Hartney also wrote his memoirs. This work was originally published in 1940, under the title of Up and At 'Em, by Stackpole Sons (Harrisburg, Pennsylvania). Since then, other editions too have been commercially published. A British edition was published in 1974 by Bailey Bros. & Swinfen Ltd., under the title of Wings Over France.

== See also ==
- List of World War I flying aces from the United States

== Bibliography ==
- Pusher Aces of World War 1. Jon Guttman, Harry Dempsey. Osprey Pub Co, 2009. ISBN 1-84603-417-5, ISBN 978-1-84603-417-6.
- Hartney, Harold E. (1940) Up & At 'Em, New Edition (Ace Books: New York City, 1971).
