= Rembercourt Aerodrome =

Temporary World War I airfield nearby

- Part of American Expeditionary Forces (AEF)
- Located near: Rembercourt-Sommaisne, France
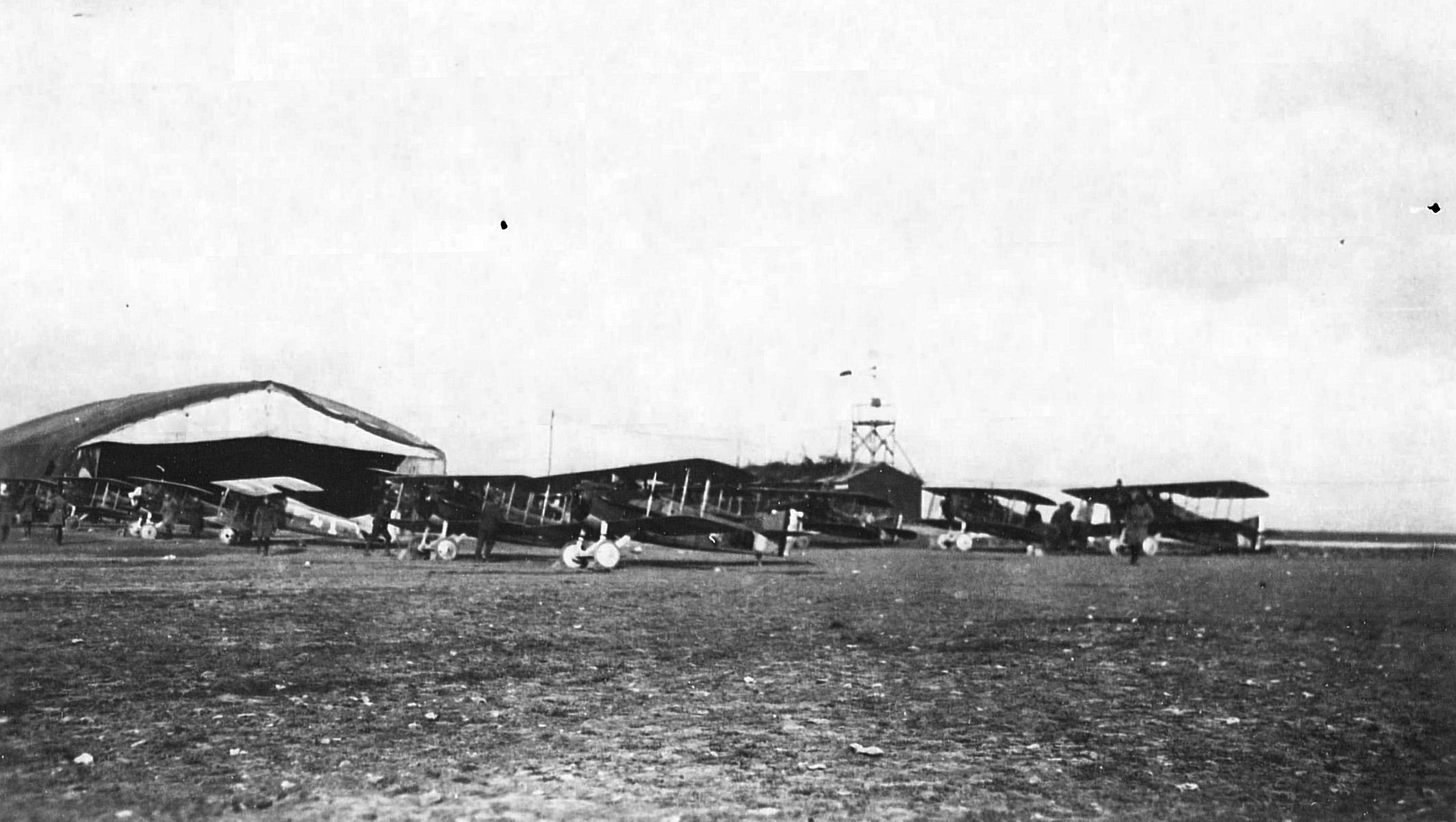
- 94th Aero Squadron - Flightline at Rembercourt Aerodrome, France, late October 1918. Note the wind-direction flag on the headquarters building. It was captured from the German Stenay Airdrome

Site information
- Type: Combat Airfield
- Controlled by: Air Service, United States Army
- Condition: Agricultural area

Location
- Coordinates: 48°55′08″N 005°12′46″E

Site history
- Built: 1918
- In use: 1918–1919
- Battles/wars: World War I

Garrison information
- Garrison: 1st Pursuit Group; United States First Army Air Service

Rembercourt Aerodrome was a temporary World War I airfield in France. It was located 1.6 miles (2.6 km) east-northeast of Rembercourt aux Pots, now part of Rembercourt-Sommaisne, in the Meuse department in northeastern France.

== Overview ==
An airfield was built and used by the French Air Service at "Rembercourt" in early 1916 and again in August 1918, before it was transferred to American Air Service in early September 1918.

From 1 September 1918, it became the home of the 1st Pursuit Group until the end of war, especially during both the St. Mihiel and Meuse-Argonne Offensives, with five squadrons: 27th, 94th, 95th, 147th and 185th Aero Squadrons. In addition, it was a repair depot for both aircraft and vehicles, being the home of the 4th Air Park and Flight "C", 648th Aero Squadron, along with various aircraft hangars, support buildings and quarters for personnel.

By the end of 1918, the Americans left and the airfield was abandoned and returned to agricultural use. Today, it is a series of cultivated fields located on the south side of the Départmental 902 (D902), northwest of Erize-la-Petite, with no indications of its wartime use. A large electrical windmill is now erected on the site.

== Known units assigned ==
- Headquarters, 1st Pursuit Group, 1 September – 11 November 1918
- 27th Aero Squadron (Pursuit) 3 September – 12 December 1918
- 94th Aero Squadron (Pursuit) 1 September – 20 November 1918
- 95th Aero Squadron (Pursuit) 2 September – 11 December 1918

Flight Operated from: Verdun Aerodrome, 7 November 1918 – unknown 1919

- 147th Aero Squadron (Pursuit) 1 September – 12 December 1918

Flight operated from: Verdun Airdrome, 25 September 1918 – unknown 1919

- 185th Aero Squadron, (Night Pursuit)) 7 October – 11 November 1918

== See also ==
- List of Air Service American Expeditionary Force aerodromes in France
