= 185th Aero Squadron =

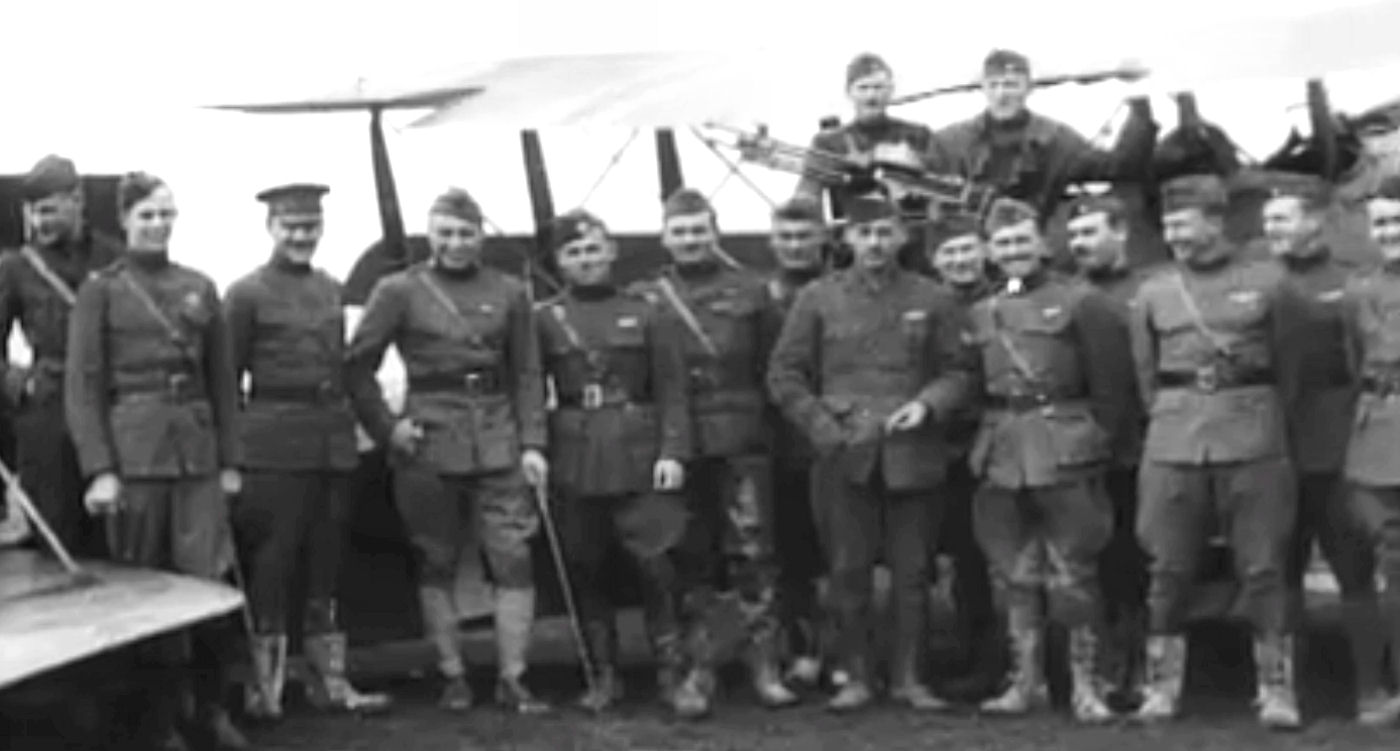
- Officers of the 185th Aero Squadron, Rembercourt Aerodrome, France, November 1918
- Active: 11 November 1917 – 30 June 1919
- Country: United States
- Branch: United States Army Air Service
- Type: Squadron
- Role: Night Pursuit
- Part of: American Expeditionary Forces (AEF)
- Fuselage Code: "Bats"
- Engagements: World War I

Commanders
- Notable commanders: Lt. Seth Low; Capt. Jerry C. Vasconcells

Insignia
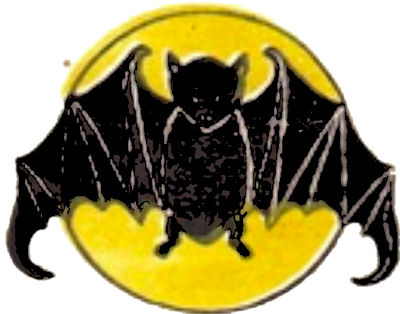
- 185th Aero Squadron Emblem

Aircraft flown
- Fighter: Sopwith Camel F.1, 1918

Service record
- Operations: 1st Pursuit Group; Western Front, France: 5 October-11 November 1918: Sorties: 126; Combat missions: 34; Enemy combats: 6; Enemy Aircraft shot down: 0 (1 probable)
- Victories: No official victories, however the 1st Pursuit Group commander, Col. Harold E. Hartney flew a night patrol in a squadron aircraft on 22 October 1918 and engaged a German Gotha G.V bomber. He attacked the aircraft and the aircraft he flew came back bullet-ridden, however no claim of a victory was made. Later, the crashed remains of a Gotha was found in the area where he was engaged in combat. It may have been the first (and only) night victory of the Air Service during World War I.

The 185th Aero Squadron was a United States Army Air Service unit that fought on the Western Front during World War I.

Known as the "Bats", the 185th Aero Squadron was the first and only night pursuit (fighter) squadron organized by the United States during World War I. Its mission was night interception of enemy aircraft, primarily bombers and observation aircraft. It was engaged in combat for less than a month before the 1918 Armistice with Germany. After the armistice, the squadron returned to the United States in June 1919 and was demobilized.

The 185th Aero Squadron was reactivated as the 185th Cyberspace Operations Squadron in June 2019, 100 years after being demobilized. Just as the Bats of WW1 were faced with a new mission in a new domain to protect their fellow soldiers on the ground, the Bats of today hunt and illuminate their adversaries within the Air Force's Cyberspace environment. The 185 COS is under the 192nd Wing, Virginia Air National Guard, which shares a total force integration relationship with the 1st Fighter Wing on Langley Air Force Base.

== History ==
=== Origins ===
The 185th Aero Squadron was organized on 11 November 1917 at Kelly Field #2, Texas by the transfer of men from the 24th Aero Squadron. Many of the men had experience flying or maintaining the Curtiss JN-4B "Jenny" trainers. On the 15th, additional men were transferred to the squadron from the 2d Recruit Battalion and 3d Recruit Battalion. On 20 January 1918, the squadron was transferred to Aviation Concentration Center, Mitchell Field, Long Island for duty overseas. After just over a week, the squadron embarked on the RMS Adriatic, arriving in Liverpool, England on 16 February after being delayed in Halifax, Nova Scotia for a convoy. At Liverpool, the squadron boarded a train and arrived at Winchester, England that evening, where it was assigned to the Romney Rest Camp.

=== Training in England ===
On 28 February, the squadron was divided into Flights and placed under control of the Royal Flying Corps for training. "B", "C" and "D" flights were transferred to 4 Training Depot Station (TDS) at RFC Hooton Park in Cheshire. "A" flight was transferred to 63 TDS, RFC Ternhill, Shropshire.

At Hooton, the squadron was trained in the airplane repair shop, the engine repair shop and also in motor transport repair. Other men were trained in various clerical duties. The men at Ternhill were trained in a similar manner. The squadron was trained on both Sopwith strutters and Sopwith Camels with rotary engines and Sopwith Dolphin fighters equipped with Hispano-Suiza 8B engines. In April, the 185th Aero Squadron was recombined at RFC Hooton, where the squadron continued training. On 16 June, the squadron was inspected by RFC Colonel Mansfield, Commander of the 37 Wing and he expressed his appreciation for the work provided by the squadron, owing to the shortage of British men who were at the front. By July, the men of the 185th were becoming impatient, as it was rumored the squadron would remain in England on a permanent basis, however orders were finally relieved to report to the Flower Down Rest Camp near Winchester on 7 August.

After a final inspection at Flower Down, the squadron received a final inspection before boarding a train to Southampton on 11 August. Late the next afternoon, the squadron crossed the English Channel and arrived at American Rest Camp #2 in Le Havre, France.

=== Combat in France ===
The next day the squadron boarded a troop train, bound for the St. Maixent Replacement Barracks, arriving on 16 August. There the squadron was equipped with steel helmets and gas masks and training in the tear gas chamber. On 20 August, the squadron boarded a troop train and proceeded to the 1st Air Depot, Colombey-les-Belles Airdrome, arriving on the 23d. Once the authorities at the depot realized the 185th was fully trained, the men were assigned to aircraft maintenance duties and also at the depot.

The need for pilots being so great on 16 September, seventeen squadron pilots were transferred out to fill vacancies in other squadrons at the front, leaving the 185th with two trained pilots, and still without any aircraft to fly. Finally, on 7 October, orders were received to move to Rembercourt Aerodrome and join the 1st Pursuit Group. After a rainy, long, uncomfortable trip by truck, the squadron arrived on the 10th late in the afternoon. On 12 October, fourteen Sopwith Camels were assigned to the 185th and the pilots began trial flights. A few days later, five pilots, who had been transferred out at Colombey returned to the 185th.

At Rembercourt, the 185th was designated as a "Night Chase" Squadron, the first of its type organized by the American Army. Night Pursuit work was in its infancy. The Sopwith Camels were planes that were considered almost to be obsolete, except for training. The pilots were not trained in night flying, with many of them never having taken off after dusk. Also, the squadron had to experiment with wing flares, parachute flares and instrument lights. Also the airdrome had no landing lights, and the searchlights and Anti-Aircraft batteries were not versed with American planes flying after dusk. In addition, there were not enough searchlights for the guidance of our pilots, who frequently could not find the airfield at night and had to make forced landings after running out of gasoline. Many accidents were caused and there was a chronic lack of spare parts for the airplanes.

==== Night Pursuit Operations ====
Nevertheless, on 18–19 October 1918, the first orders were issued and the 185th Aero Squadron (Night Pursuit) stood its first alert that night from dusk until dawn. On the night of the 21st the squadron was alerted that there were several enemy aircraft flying over Troyon, and the squadron took off in its first night interception mission. However upon arrival over the area, no enemy aircraft were seen. On the night of the 22d, the squadron made a low-level fight over enemy territory and Lieutenant Kelton fired about 100 rounds into a troop train between Spincourt and Longuyon. However, due to poor visibility, he was unable to report the results.

The only aerial combat of the squadron happened on the night of 23 October when Lts Kelton and Johnson were on alert when a report came in that enemy Gotha bombers were over Bar-le-Duc. Immediately, both pilots took off to intercept the enemy aircraft. Kelton reported that he observed searchlights in the Bar-le-Duc area performing sweeps to locate the enemy aircraft. He saw one bomber and fired a burst of 20 shots that struck the aircraft. He then saw another enemy aircraft that he fired a burst of 10 shots at. He observed Anti-Aircraft fire and searchlights in the sky and saw tracer bullets being fired into the air. He fired at long range at the aircraft but the results were unobserved. It was later learned that Kelton and Johnson frightened away the enemy aircraft by their unexpected appearance before dropping all of their bombs. They later jettisoned the remainder of their bombs in an open countryside area as they returned to their lines. Although the 185th did not shoot down any of the aircraft, by disrupting their mission, a symbolic victory was achieved.

One pilot was killed in an aircraft accident, Lt Ewing on 28 October. His plane caught on fire and crashed 500 yards southwest of Rembercourt due to a malfunctioning altimeter. Lieutenant Kelton went missing on the 30th. He was on a strafing mission in enemy territory and was shot down. Taken POW, he escaped and walked back to the unit arriving one month later.

Active operations of the squadron ended on 11 November with the signing of the Armistice with Germany.

=== Demobilization ===
Daylight Proficiency flights were conducted after the Armistice with Germany, however, no flights were permitted to be flown over German-controlled territory. The squadron remained at Rembercourt for about a month. On 11 December 1918 orders were received from First Army for the squadron to report to the 1st Air Depot, Colombey-les-Belles Airdrome to turn in all of its supplies and equipment and was relieved from duty with the AEF. The squadron's Sopwith aircraft were delivered to the Air Service American Air Service Acceptance Park No. 1 at Orly Aerodrome to be returned to the British. There practically all of the pilots and observers were detached from the squadron.

During the organization's stay at Colombey, the men attended to the usual camp duties. Personnel at Colombey were subsequently assigned to the commanding general, services of supply, and ordered to report to one of several staging camps in France. There, personnel awaited scheduling to report to one of the base ports in France for transport to the United States and subsequent demobilization. On 6 May 1919, the 185th was moved to Base Station #5 near the port of Brest prior to its return to the United States. Upon arrival the men were caught up on any back pay owed to them, de-loused, a formal military records review was performed and a passenger list was created prior to the men boarding a ship.

On 1 June 1919, the 185th Aero Squadron boarded a troop ship and sailed for New York Harbor, arriving on the 28th. It proceeded to Mitchel Field, Long Island on 15 June where the personnel of the squadron were demobilized and returned to civilian life.

=== Lineage ===
- Organized as 185th Aero Squadron, on 11 November 1917

Re-designated: 185th Aero Squadron (Night Pursuit), on 10 October 1918
Demobilized on 30 June 1919.

=== Assignments ===
- Post Headquarters, Kelly Field, 11 November 1917
- Aviation Concentration Center, 20 January 1918
- Port of Entry, Hoboken, New Jersey

Overseas transport, RMS Adriatic, 28 January-16 February 1918

- Air Service Headquarters, AEF, British Isles

Detached to the Royal Flying Corps for training, 28 February-12 August 1918

- Air Service Replacement Concentration Barracks, AEF, France, 16 August 1918
- 1st Air Depot, 23 October 1918
- 1st Pursuit Group, 10 October 1918
- 1st Air Depot, 11 December 1918
- Commanding General, Services of Supply, 6–19 February 1919
- Post Headquarters, Mitchel Field, 15–30 June 1919

=== Stations ===
- Kelly Field, Texas, 11 November 1917
- Aviation Concentration Center, Garden City, New York, 20 January 1918
- Liverpool, England, 16 February 1918
- Romney Rest Camp, Winchester, England, 17 February 1918

Squadron divided into flights, being assigned to RFC Hooton Park and RFC Ternhill
Squadron re-assembled at RFC Hooton, April 1918

- Flower Down Rest Camp, Winchester, England, 7 August 1918
- American Rest Camp #2, Le Havre, France, 11 August 1918
- St. Maixent Replacement Barracks, France, 16 August 1918
- Colombey-les-Belles Airdrome, 23 August 1918
- Rembercourt Aerodrome, 10 October 1918
- Colombey-les-Belles Airdrome, 11 December 1918
- Brest, France, 6 May 1919
- Mitchel Field, New York, 15–30 1919

=== Combat sectors and campaigns ===
Streamer	Sector/Campaign	Dates	Notes
	Meuse-Argonne Offensive Campaign	26 September-11 November 1918	

=== Citation Star ===
Lieutenant Elihu H. Kelten received a Citation Star on October 30, 1918.

== See also ==
- Organization of the Air Service of the American Expeditionary Force
- List of American aero squadrons
