= 1st Operations Group =

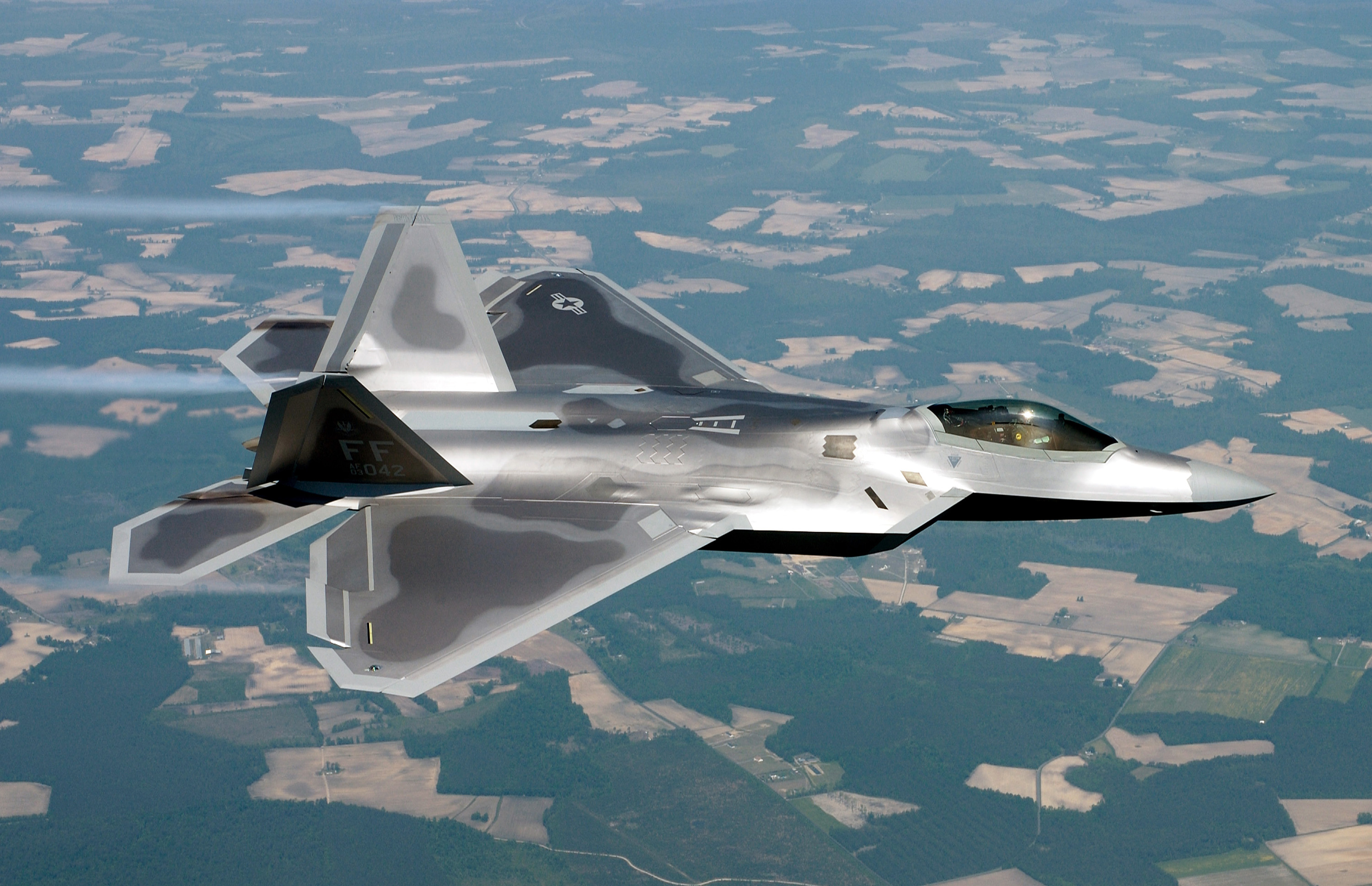
- F-22 Raptor, 27th Fighter Squadron
- Active: 5 May 1918 – present
- Country: United States
- Branch: United States Air Force
- Type: Group
- Role: Air Dominance
- Part of: 1st Fighter Wing; Air Combat Command
- Garrison/HQ: Langley Field, Joint Base Langley–Eustis, Virginia
- Motto: Aut Vincere Aut Mori – Conquer or Die
- Tail Code: "FF"
- Engagements: World War I: Champagne-Marne Defensive Campaign; Aisne-Marne Offensive Campaign; St Mihiel Offensive Campaign; Meuse-Argonne Offensive Campaign; World War II (EAME Theater): Air Offensive, Europe Campaign; Algeria-French Morocco Campaign; Tunisia Campaign; Sicily Campaign; Naples-Foggia Campaign; Anzio Campaign; Rome-Arno Campaign; Normandy Campaign; Northern France Campaign; Southern France Campaign; North Apennines Campaign; Rhineland Campaign; Central Europe Campaign; Po Valley Campaign; Armed Forces Expeditionary: Operation Northern Watch; Operation Southern Watch; War on Terrorism Expeditionary: Operation Enduring Freedom; Operation Iraqi Freedom

- Decorations: Distinguished Unit Citation: Italy, 25 August 1943; 30 August 1943; Ploesti, Rumania, 18 May 1944; Air Force Outstanding Unit Award (4x)

Commanders
- Notable commanders: Frank M. Andrews; General Carl A. Spaatz

Insignia
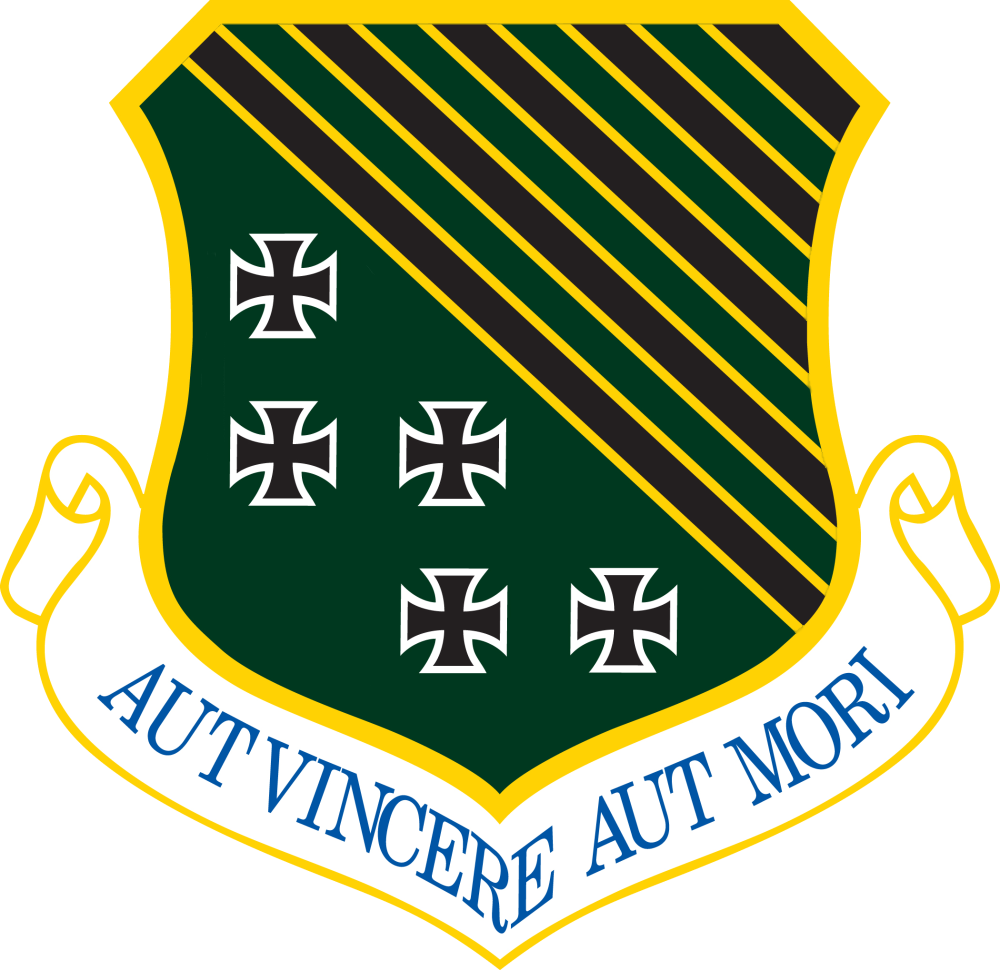
- 1st Operations Group emblem

Aircraft flown
- Fighter: F-22 Raptor

The 1st Operations Group (1 OG) is the flying component of the 1st Fighter Wing, assigned to the USAF Air Combat Command. The group is stationed at Langley Air Force Base, Virginia. The 1st Operations Group is the oldest major air combat unit in the United States Air Force, being the successor organization of the 1st Pursuit Group. The 1st Pursuit Group was the first air combat group formed by the Air Service, American Expeditionary Force, on 5 May 1918.

The Group was first organized at Croix de Metz Aerodrome, near Toul, France, as a result of the United States entry into World War I. As the 1st Pursuit Group it saw combat on the Western Front in France, and during World War II as the 1st Fighter Group combat in the Mediterranean Theater of Operations. Pilots of the 1st Group are credited by the USAF with destroying 554.33 aircraft and 50 balloons, and 36 pilots are recognized as being aces.

The pilots of the 1st Group included Captain Eddie Rickenbacker, credited as the top scoring American ace in France during World War I. During World War II, the 1st FG was among the first groups deployed overseas in the summer of 1942. The group flew missions in England as part of the Eighth Air Force, then was transferred to North Africa in November 1942. It experienced significant combat as part of the Twelfth Air Force, moved to Italy, and became part of the fighter force of the Fifteenth Air Force. The 1st FG was equipped with the first operational U.S. jet fighter aircraft, the P-80A Shooting Star, in 1946.

Inactivated in 1961, after 30 years the group was renamed the 1st Operations Group (OG) and activated on 1 October 1991 as a result of the 1st Fighter Wing implementing the USAF objective wing organization. In 2005, the 1st OG was the first operational combat unit to receive the F-22A Raptor, a fifth generation fighter aircraft that uses stealth technology.

== Overview ==
The 1st OG directs the training and employment of two F-22A Raptor air dominance squadrons and an operations support squadron. The group's flying squadrons maintain 36 F-22 air superiority fighter aircraft.

The group is responsible for 300 people and $3 billion in resources.

In addition to carrying out local training requirements, the group deploys personnel and equipment on a regular basis to support air expeditionary operations worldwide as part of the global war on terrorism.

== Units ==
The 1st Operations Group consists of the following component squadrons:

- 7th Fighter Training Squadron (T-38A)
- 27th Fighter Squadron (F-22A)

The 27th Fighter Squadron (FS) is one of the oldest fighter squadrons in the Air Force, being first organized on 15 June 1917. The 27th FS is tasked to provide air superiority for United States or allied forces by engaging and destroying enemy forces, equipment, defenses or installations for global deployment.

- 71st Fighter Squadron (F-22A) Formal Training Unit for F-22A pilots
- 94th Fighter Squadron (F-22A)

The 94th FS is another of the oldest fighter squadrons in the Air Force, being first organized on 20 August 1917. The 94th FS is tasked to provide air superiority for the United States or allied forces by engaging and destroying enemy forces, equipment, defenses or installations for global deployment.

- 1st Operations Support Squadron

The 1st Operations Support Squadron, which traces its history to the World War II 1st Airdrome Detachment, is responsible for all facets of airfield operations, air traffic control, weather, aircrew life support and training, intelligence analysis and support, weapons and tactics training, 1st FW battle staff operations, airspace scheduling, range operations and wing flying hour program for three fighter squadrons.

== History ==
=== World War I ===
When first deployed to France, the Aero Squadrons of the American Expeditionary Force (AEF) were dispersed among the various army organizations. This made it difficult, however, to coordinate aerial activities. Some higher organization was required.

==== Origins ====
The 94th and 95th Aero Squadrons had trained and traveled together since their organization on 20 August 1917 at Kelly Field, Texas. When the two squadrons boarded a train at Kelly Field on 20 September 1917 for the trip to Mineola, New York, they consisted entirely of the enlisted echelon that would form the squadron's ground support element. Arriving at Mineola on 5 October, the squadrons reported directly to Aviation Mobilization Camp No. 2. Each unit completed training there in about three weeks and proceeded to Pier No. 45, Hoboken, New Jersey where, on 27 October 1917, it boarded the Cunard liner RMS Carpathia for the trip to Europe.

The two squadrons arrived at Liverpool on 10 November, spent about fourteen hours in a rest camp, boarded a steamer at Southampton, and sailed for France on 12 November. The 94th and 95th entered camp at Le Havre the next day, but their travels were not quite over. On 15 November the 95th moved to the 3d Aviation Training Center at Issoudun Aerodrome.

On 18 November the 94th moved to the 1st Aviation Training Center at Paris, where it divided into seven detachments that immediately began advanced maintenance training in the region's airframe and aero-engine plants. The 94th reassembled in Paris and departed for Issoudun on 24 January 1918.

After the 95th's personnel arrived at Issoudun in November, they received advanced training on the same types of aircraft they would operate at the front. The 95th thus found itself well along in its training when the 1st Pursuit Organization and Training Center announced its readiness to receive units in mid-February, and it became the first unit to be attached to the center. The 94th made good progress at Issoudun, however, and it reported to Villeneuve not long after the 95th.

==== 1st Pursuit Organization Center ====
On 16 January 1918, Brig. General Benjamin Foulois, Chief of Air Service, AEF, assigned Major Bert M. Atkinson to command of the 1st Pursuit Organization and Training Center, a temporary administrative and training organization for arriving U.S. pursuit squadrons on 16 January 1918 in Paris. Headquarters for the new unit was designated to be located at Villeneuve-les-Vertus Aerodrome. The command staff left Paris and selected a site for its headquarters adjoining that of the Groupe de Combat No 12 of the French Aeronautique Militaire at Vertus, near the airfield.

The initial task of the unit was to erect barracks for arriving personnel from the United States; obtaining hangar space from the French; and obtaining airplanes. The 95th Aero Squadron arrived on 19 February from the 3d Instructional Center at Issoudun Aerodrome, however the squadron's aircraft had not yet arrived. On 28 February word was received that the 94th Aero Squadron would be leaving Issoudun on 1 March. Bad weather with heavy sleet and snow inhibited the arrival of Nieuport 28 airplanes for the group, and the first elements of the 94th Squadron arrived on 5 March. The next day, two Nieuports arrived and by 8 March a total of sixteen aircraft were at the airfield and the squadrons began training and familiarization flights. The planes received, however, were unarmed due to a lack of machine guns due to the difference of American ammunition, which was 3mm longer than the French.

The first combat patrol by the 95th Squadron was made on 15 March, consisting of three unarmed Nieuport 28 planes and one French pilot in a SPAD took off from the airfield at 11:30. A second patrol was carried out in the afternoon to carry out a barrage of the Marne between Chalons and Eppernay. Continuous German air raids in the vicinity of Vetrus led to the digging of zigzag trenches on the Aerodrome and falling shrapnel was a hazard from the French anti-aircraft guns. Patrols continued to be carried out by the French, but none of the accompanying American planes were armed.

Due to the lack of armed aircraft, sixteen pilots of the 95th were ordered back to Issoudun to take the course in aerial gunnery. On 30 March orders were received that both squadrons were to proceed at once to Epiez Aerodrome (Meuse) where the squadrons flew combat patrols, although bad weather limited the number of patrols carried out. On 9 April the 94th was detached from the group and was moved to Toul where it acted independently until it became part of the 1st Pursuit Group on 4 May. On 14 April, the first of many enemy aircraft was brought down by the 94th Squadron, being the first American Air Service organization to bring down an enemy plane. Combat patrols by the 94th on 23 and 25 April also shot down one enemy aircraft on each. On 29 April, Captain Hall and Lt. Rickenbacker attacked and brought down an enemy aircraft. This was Lt. Rickenbacker's first official patrol. During the period prior to the formation of the 1st Pursuit Group in May, the 94th brought down a total of nine enemy aircraft. One pilot, Lt Chapman was killed and one pilot became a POW, Captain Hall.

On 22 April the 147th Aero Squadron arrived and on 24 April the 27th Aero Squadron arrived. Also the pilots of the 95th squadron returned from Issoudun. Reconnaissance patrols were carried out, however word was received that no flights over the Voil-Toul line would be permitted. on 4 May the 95th Squadron was moved to the Croix de Metz Aerodrome (Toul) where it joined the 94th Squadron which has been moved there from Epiez. The 27th and 147th were moved to Epiez. Group Headquarters was moved to Toul on 4 May.

==== 1st Pursuit Group ====
On 5 May 1918, the AEF replaced the 1st Pursuit Organization Center at Toul-Croix de Metz Aerodrome, with the 1st Pursuit Group, the first American group-level fighter establishment (the 1st Corps Observation Group, organized in April 1918, was the first U.S. group). Major Atkinson became the 1st Pursuit Group's first commanding officer, followed by Major Harold E. Hartney on 21 August 1918. The 27th and 147th Aero Squadrons (Pursuit) were officially assigned to the group on 2 June, and the 185th Aero Squadron, a night pursuit unit, on 18 October.

===== Second Battle of the Marne =====
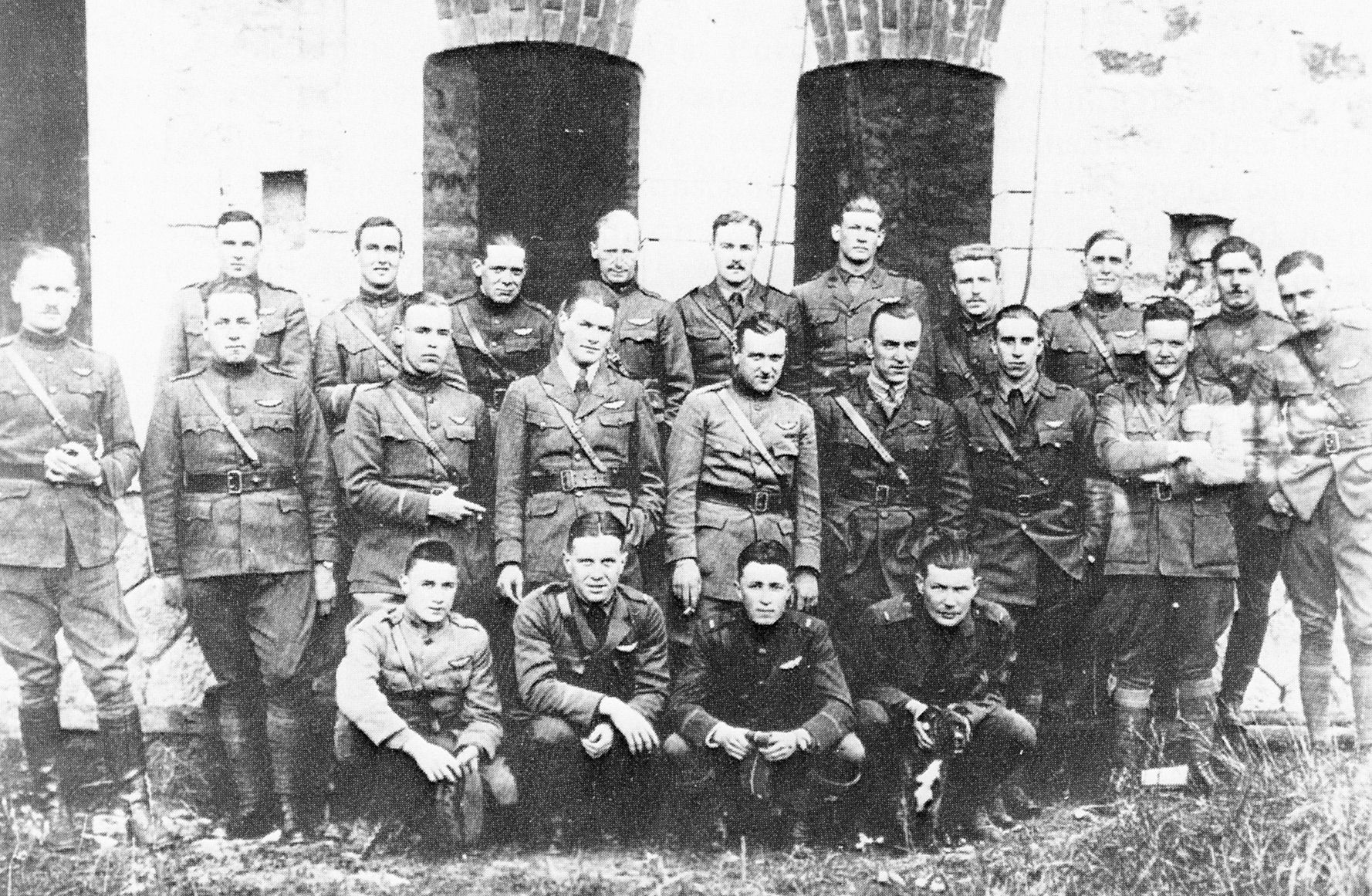
Men of the 94th Aero Squadron, Rembercourt Aerodrome, France

Upon its formation, the 1st Pursuit Group was equipped with Nieuport 28s. On 15 May, Captain David McK Peterson of the 95th squadron brought down two Enemy Aircraft. These were the first to be recorded in the records of the Group. Towards the end of June, the need for air support on the Château-Thierry front was critical due to the Germans breaking through the line. On the 28th, the group moved to Touquin Aerodrome, where the group was vigorously effective. During the weeks to follow in the Second Battle of the Marne, the group took the offensive on all points and was engaged continually in aerial combat in the Dormans-Eloup sector. Losses were heavy, however 38 victories were recorded while losing 36 pilots. This was the first real test of American airpower in the war.

On 5 July the group switched from Nieuports to SPAD XIIIs. The 94th switched over first, then by the middle of August the other three squadrons were also converted. Unfortunately, the American mechanics were unused to the V-8 engines of the Spads and so availability of the Spads suffered for the first few weeks after the changeover. On 9 July the group moved closer to the line at Saints Aerodrome. It is while stationed at Saints Aerodrome that Theodore Roosevelt's youngest son Quentin Roosevelt, flying with the 95th Aero Squadron, was shot down and killed on 14 July 1918. With the front moving north and east, the Group was now between 50 and 70 km from the lines. An advanced landing field at Coincy Aerodrome was established on 5 August for refueling and a detachment was established there from which alerts were dispatched.

===== Battle of Saint-Mihiel =====
On 31 August the group began moving to Rembercourt Aerodrome, a new airfield in the Saint-Mihiel sector. On 12 September the Saint-Mihiel Offensive started. The group was given orders to fly low and attack enemy targets on the ground, a very dangerous mission that exposed the pilots to ground fire. A number of the pilots became experts in balloon strafing, and Lt Luke of the 27th shot down fifteen enemy balloons in seventeen days. During the offensive, the group began patrols before daybreak, and kept up a constant barrage each day until after dark at night. Patrols were constantly engaging in low-level aerial battles with enemy reconnaissance and large formations of Fokker pursuit aircraft. The group kept up an incessant barrage over and above the ground forces and claimed thirty-four victories while losing one pilot.

In late September, a flight of the 27th Squadron was sent to an advanced airfield at Verdun. This flight worked on alerts and protection of Allied balloons. The Group patrolled a new sector near Watronville on the east of the Argonne forest flying low-level attacks while the Infantry advanced through the sector. Reconnaissance was flown over the enemy rear areas to secure important information about his bridges, road and troop activity.

===== Night Patrols =====
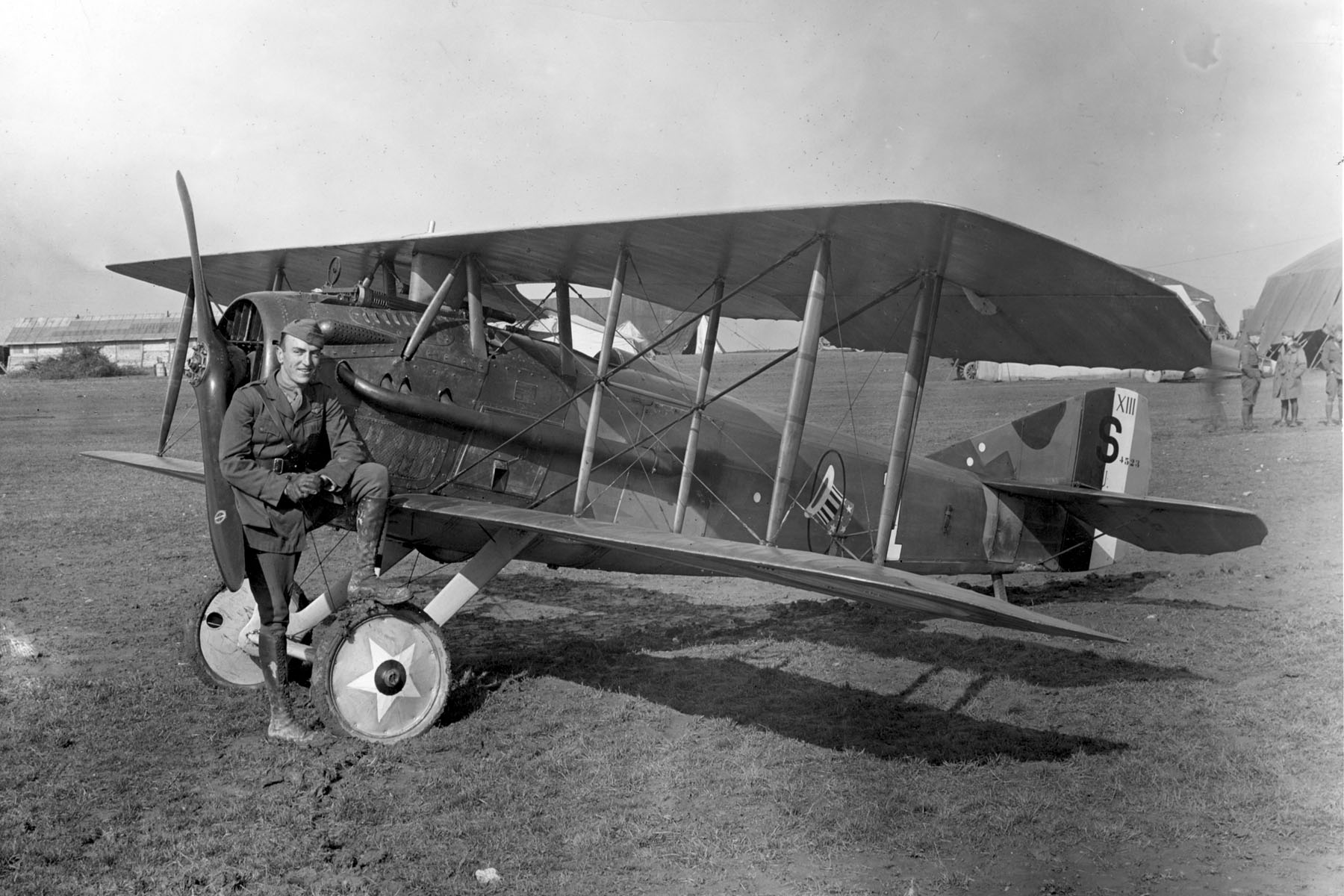
94th Aero Squadron, Capt Edward V Rickenbacker with SPAD XIII.

On 7 October, the 185th Aero Squadron was assigned to the Group, equipped with British Sopwith Camel F.1s. Its duties were to attack a line of searchlights and attack enemy night bombers. This was the first attempt at night flying attack patrols by the American Air Service. Enemy searchlights were attacked and patrols were flown where German bombers were known to cross the line at night. Adverse weather limited the effectiveness of the squadron, however the 185th engaged in five combats, however did not bring down any enemy bombers.

===== Meuse-Argonne Offensive =====
In the last great offensive of the war, the infantry continued its advance. The Group's sector advanced and lengthened considerably. On one day, 22d October, the group flew 84 Sorties with a total of 104 flying hours. Sixteen combats were engaged in, shooting down seven enemy aircraft. On 11 November news was received that the Armistice was formally signed.

===== Summary =====
From May until 11 November armistice, the Group recorded 1,413 aerial engagements, accumulating 151.83 confirmed kills of enemy aircraft, and 50 confirmed balloon victories. Nineteen of its pilots – five from each pursuit squadron except the 27th – were recognized as "aces". For its participation, the 1st received seven campaign streamers.

Two of the four pilots earning the Medal of Honor for actions during World War I were members of the 1st Pursuit Group: 2Lt Frank Luke Jr. and Captain Edward V. "Eddie" Rickenbacker.

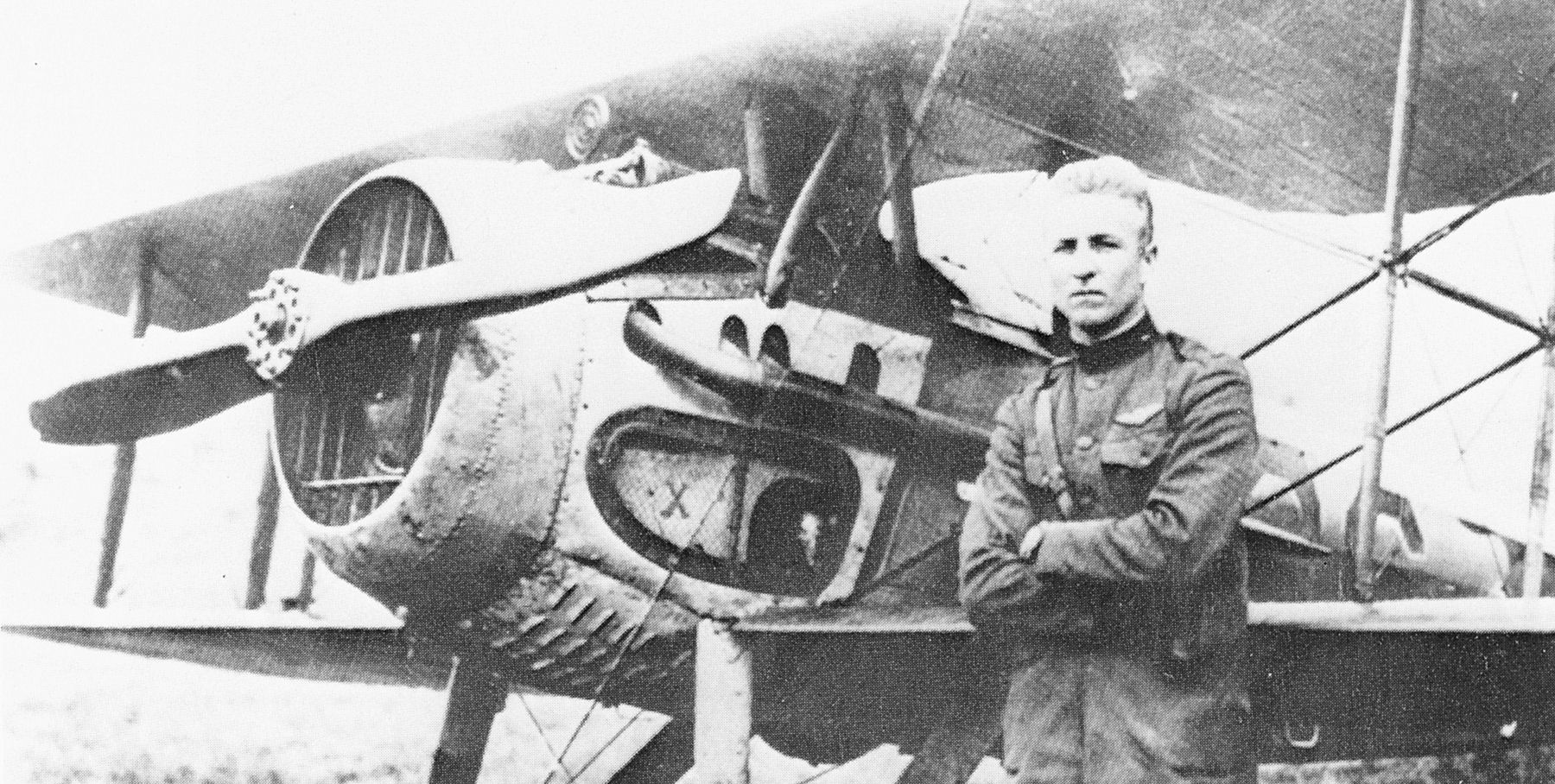
27th Aero Squadron – 2LT Frank Luke Jr with SPAD XIII

Lieutenant Luke of the 27th Squadron during September became the American Ace of Aces for the time being. From 12 to 29 September he gained eighteen victories. He shot down fifteen balloons and three planes. Joining the Group on 1 August, he had gained one victory on the Chateau Therry front which never was made official. On 18 September, he brought down two balloons and three planes in a period of less than 10 minutes. On 29 September, he was reported missing in action. He had dropped a note to one of our balloons asking them to be on the watch for burning balloons. Twenty minutes later he burned three enemy balloons but did not return from his mission.

Captain Rickenbacker, commanding officer of the 94th Squadron, became an Ace on the Toul sector in the spring of 1918. When the group moved to Rembercourt Aerodrome, Captain Rickenbacker made the 94th Squadron the leading American Fighting Squadron in number of aerial victories gained. From the period 14 September – 11 November he brought down twenty more official enemy aircraft.

Aces of the 1st Pursuit Group
Pilot	Squadron	Airplanes	Balloons	Total
Capt. Edward V. Rickenbacker	94th Aero Squadron	21	5	26
2d Lt. Frank Luke, Jr.	27th Aero Squadron	4	14	18
Capt. James A. Meissner	147th Aero Squadron	7	1	8
2d Lt. Wilbur W. White	147th Aero Squadron	7	1	8
Capt. Hamilton Coolidge	94th Aero Squadron	5	3	8
1st Lt. Reed M. Chambers	94th Aero Squadron	6	1	7
1st Lt. Sumner Sewall	95th Aero Squadron	5	2	7
1st Lt. Harvey Weir Cook	94th Aero Squadron	3	4	7
1st Lt. Lansing C. Holden	95th Aero Squadron	2	5	7
1st Lt. Douglas Campbell	94th Aero Squadron	6		6
1st Lt. Edward P. Curtiss	95th Aero Squadron	6		6
2nd Lt. John K. McArthur	27th Aero Squadron	6		6
2d Lt. Kenneth L. Porter	147th Aero Squadron	6		6
1st Lt. Jerry C. Vasconcelles	27th Aero Squadron	5	1	6
1st Lt. James Knowles	95th Aero Squadron	5		5
1st Lt. James A. Healy	147th Aero Squadron	5		5
2d Lt. Ralph A. O'Neill	147th Aero Squadron	5		5
1st Lt. Harold R. Buckley	95th Aero Squadron	4	1	5
1st Lt. Joseph F. Wehner	27th Aero Squadron		5	5

On 10 December 1918, orders were received relieving the First Pursuit Group from First Army with instructions to report to Commanding Officer, First Air Depot, Colombey-les-Belles Airdrome for demobilization.

=== Air Service duty ===
The end of World War I was followed immediately by a massive demobilization of the U.S. Army Air Service, both in reduction of personnel and dissolution of air units, including the 1st Pursuit Group, demobilized 24 December 1918. A new 1st Pursuit Group began to be formed on 10 June 1919, at Selfridge Field, Michigan, and became an active part of the Air Service on 22 August 1919, consisting of the 27th, 94th, 95th and 147th Aero Squadrons (Pursuit), and the 2nd Air Park (later the 57th Service Squadron). The new 1st Pursuit Group, as part of the 1st Wing, moved to Kelly Field, Texas, on 31 August 1919, and Ellington Field, Texas, on 30 June 1921. There, the 94th Aero Squadron operated the Pursuit Training School. The 1st Pursuit Group returned to Selfridge on 14 June 1922, as part of the Sixth Corps Area, where it remained until World War II.

The designation of the Aero Squadrons was changed to "Squadrons (Pursuit)" on 15 March 1921 The 147th Aero Squadron became the 17th Squadron (Pursuit) on 31 March. All were renamed "Pursuit Squadrons" on 25 January 1923. The 2nd Air Park was renamed the 57th Service Squadron on 2 January 1923. In 1924 the original 1st Pursuit Group was reconstituted and consolidated with the active group formed in 1919. Two squadrons were transferred from the group, the 95th (1927) and the 17th (1940), replaced on 1 January 1941, by the 71st Pursuit Squadron. The 27th, 71st, and 94th Squadrons became the permanently assigned components of the group and wing. In December 1939 the group was redesignated 1st Pursuit Group (Interceptor), and in May 1941, 1st Pursuit Group (Fighter).

During the 1920s the group conducted pursuit training, tested new aircraft, participated in maneuvers and mobilization tests, conducted annual cold weather testing, gave demonstrations for other units, participated in civil airport dedications, and competed in the National Air Races each autumn. In 1922 Selfridge hosted the event. Captain Burt E. Skeel, commander of the 27th Pursuit Squadron, was killed 4 October 1924, in the crash of a Verville-Sperry R-3 at Wright Field, Dayton, Ohio, at the start of Pulitzer Trophy event of the 1924 Races.

The group changed aircraft frequently during its service between wars, as new types were developed and older models became outdated. It began its service flying Curtiss JNS, SE-5, and Fokker D.VII fighters left over from the First World War. From 1922 to 1925 it operated primarily MB-3A fighters. In 1925 it acquired Curtiss PW-8s for use by the 17th Pursuit Squadron, in 1926 Curtiss P-1 Hawks (a derivative of the PW-8), and in 1929 Boeing P-12s. Throughout this period each squadron often operated a different fighter type from the others.

Winter flying was conducted each February at Camp Skeel at Oscoda, Michigan, although in January 1927 the group instead sent a detachment to Ottawa, Ontario. In January 1929 the group conducted a lengthy search and rescue operation for a missing person in Petoskey, Michigan; and in January 1930 flew a squadron to Spokane, Washington, and back by way of North Dakota and Montana. Temperatures during the Petoskey rescue reached −30 °F (−34 °C), disabling the aircraft engines. A local cement company extended a steam hose to thaw engine oil and other components, enabling the aircraft to operate.

The use of airpower demonstrations and participation in the dedication of civil airports to publicize the Air Corps reached its peak in 1929, when units of the 1st Pursuit Group participated in 24 airport dedications and 8 demonstrations. It garnered favorable publicity in other ways, however, using bombs to break up an ice jam on the Clinton River on 24 February 1925, and escorting Charles Lindbergh to Canada in 1927.

On 21 January 1924, the Adjutant General approved the 1st Pursuit Group's emblem, designed with the unit's history as its basis. The green and black colors represent the colors of the Army Air Service, the five stripes signify the original five flying squadrons, and the five crosses symbolized the five major World War I campaigns credited to the group. A crest above the shield bore the Group's Latin motto "Aut Vincere Aut Mori" (translation: "Conquer or Die"). In 1957, the emblem was revised, with the crest removed and the motto placed in a scroll beneath the shield, now assigned to the 1st Tactical Fighter Wing.

=== Army Air Corps service ===
The Air Corps Act of 1926, drafted by Chief of Air Service Mason Patrick and passed in part due to the controversies involving Billy Mitchell and in part to the recommendations of the Morrow Board, replaced the Air Service with the U.S. Army Air Corps. The Act authorized a 5-year plan for expansion and modernization of the Air Corps, still consisting of the original 6 groups, with the 1st the only pursuit group.

Resistance by the Coolidge administration to implementation of the plan for economic reasons, followed by the onset of the Great Depression severely limited the expansion. The 1st Group experienced restriction on its training operations and curtailment of personnel salaries. Officers were detached for duty with the Civilian Conservation Corps at varied intervals. However the Air Corps was able to expand from 6 to 14 groups in its first decade of existence, half of which were new pursuit groups. The 1st Pursuit Group trained individual squadrons at Selfridge and provided experienced cadres to the formation of these groups.

From February to June 1934 the 1st Pursuit Group delivered the mail in the north central United States under an executive order of President Franklin Roosevelt (see Air Mail scandal). Original orders called for 35 pilots and 16 aircraft to be detached for mail service, but the Curtiss P-6 Hawk and Boeing P-12 fighters detailed had insufficient cargo capacity potential. Ultimately 56 pilots were listed in group records as detached for mail service, and approximately half the group's 70 aircraft were involved. Six were involved in crashes in the first week, struggling through severe winter weather in Ohio, including one fatality on the first day. Altogether twelve aircraft were lost in eleven crashes, with one pilot and one enlisted man killed, and four pilots and one mechanic injured.

On 1 March 1935, all operational flying units, previously assigned to corps-level ground commands, were consolidated under a new centralized air force command named General Headquarters, Air Force. GHQ Air Force was divided into three wings, and the 1st Pursuit Group became part of the 2nd Wing.

In 1937 the group received its first enclosed cockpit, monoplane fighter with retractable landing gear, the Seversky P-35, replacing P-26s and PB-2As. The P-35 was obsolete from the beginning of its operational history and replacement by the Republic P-43 Lancer began in 1940. This fighter too was unsuitable for modern combat, and preparations for the possibility of U.S. participation in the Second World War introduced the 1st Pursuit Group to the new P-38 Lightning in July 1941, with the 27th Pursuit Squadron receiving the first operational aircraft in the Army Air Force's inventory.

==== 1st Pursuit Group Commanders ====
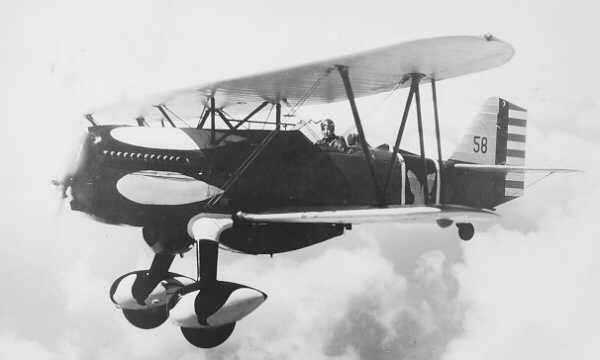
Curtiss P-6 Hawk in markings of 17th Pursuit Squadron, 1st Pursuit Group

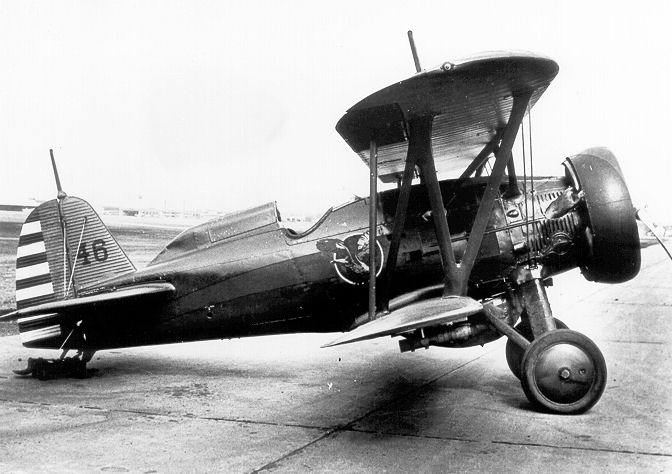
27th PS Boeing P-12E at Selfridge Field. The fuselage is olive drab, the wings yellow, and the cowl ring red.

Commander	Dates
Lt.Col. Davenport Johnson	22 August 1919 – 26 April 1920
Major Reed M. Chambers	26 April 1920 – 29 June 1920
Capt. Arthur R. Brooks	29 June 1920 – 5 October 1920
Major Carl Spaatz	5 October 1921 – 25 April 1921
Capt. Arthur R. Brooks	25 April 1921 – 21 December 1921
Major Carl Spaatz	21 December 1921 – September 1924
Major Thomas G. Lanphier, Sr.	September 1924 – 4 February 1926
Capt. Vincent B. Dixon	4 February 1926 – 26 June 1926
Major Thomas G. Lanphier, Sr.	26 June 1926 – 25 August 1928
Major Ralph Royce	25 August 1928 – 15 May 1930
Major Gerald E. Brower	15 May 1930 – 18 July 1932
Major Adlai H. Gilkerson	18 July 1932 – 4 July 1933
Lt.Col. Frank M. Andrews	4 July 1933 – 4 October 1934
Lt.Col. Ralph Royce	4 October 1934 – 30 April 1937
Major Edwin J. House	30 April 1937
Col. Henry B. Clagett	1938
Col. Lawrence P. Hickey	1939
Lt.Col. Robert S. Israel	July 1941 – June 1942

=== 1st Fighter Group in World War II ===
1st Fighter Group
- Active: 7 December 1941 to 16 October 1945
- Country: United States
- Branch: United States Army Air Forces
- Type: Fighter Group
- Role: Air Superiority; Close air support
- Size: 1,000 personnel 125 P-38 aircraft
- Part of: Twelfth Air Force; Fifteenth Air Force
- Engagements: DUC: 25 August 1943; DUC: 30 August 1943; DUC: Ploieşti, 18 May 1944

Insignia
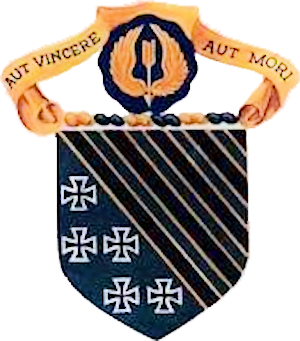
- 1st Fighter Group emblem

On the date the United States entered World War II the 94th Pursuit Squadron was in El Paso, Texas, its 20 P-38s en route from Selfridge Field to March Field, California. The 27th and 71st squadrons were immediately sent with an additional 12 P-38s and 24 P-43 fighters to March Field to provide the West Coast air defense against Japanese attack.

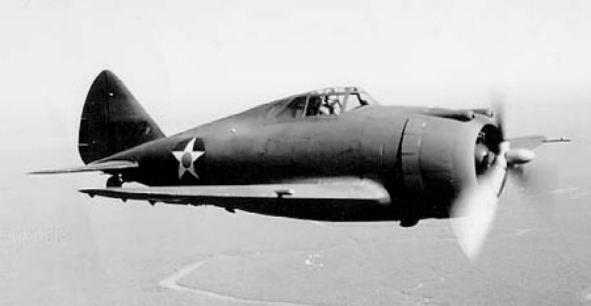
Republic P-43 Lancer

During its brief duty at March Field the Group provided cadre for newly mobilized fighter groups, losing over half of its assigned officers and enlisted men, but still made preparations for deployment to Europe on 25 April 1942. Before its departure, however, retired captain Eddie Rickenbacker made the first of several visits to the group both at home and abroad during World War II, listened to the Group's concerns and reported them to General "Hap" Arnold. Rickenbacker also worked with Arnold to reinstate the hat-in-the ring emblem, absent since Rickenbacker himself claimed the right to it when he retired, back to the 94th Fighter Squadron.

In 1942, U.S. war policy placed first priority with the war in Europe. VIII Fighter Command Special Orders 46, dated 25 June 1942, deployed 86 aircraft and pilots of the newly designated 1st Fighter Group to England as part of Operation Bolero, with the first aircraft departing on 27 June. Flights of P-38s were led by individual B-17s from the 97th Bomb Group navigating the route between Presque Isle, Maine, Labrador, Greenland and Iceland. En route the 27th Fighter Squadron was detached at "Indigo" airfield, Reykjavík, Iceland, for air defense duty in July and August. On 15 July 1942, six fighters from the 94th FS, "Tomcat Yellow" and "Tomcat Green", and their two B-17 escorts were forced by bad weather and low fuel to land on a glacier in Greenland. The crews were all recovered safely but the aircraft were abandoned.

Group headquarters and the 71st Fighter Squadron were based at RAF Goxhill, near Kingston upon Hull, and the 94th FS at Kirton in Lindsey. The 27th flew to England on 27 August after the group had moved south to Ibsley, and was based at High Ercall. During the late summer of 1942, the 1st FG flew training, escort and fighter sweeps over German-occupied France. The group experienced its first combat loss on 2 October 1942, when a P-38F escorting B-17 Flying Fortress bombers on a mission to Méaulte, France, was shot down by a German fighter of JG 26 near Calais, and 2nd Lt. William H. Young was killed in action.

The fighter and bomber groups initially deployed to England (97th and 301st Bomb Groups, and 1st, 14th, 31st, and 52nd Fighter Groups) were reassigned to support Operation Torch and redeployed to North Africa. While in transit, two 94th FS Lightnings were forced by mechanical difficulties to land in neutral Portugal, where the aircraft were confiscated and the pilots interned. However 1st Lt. Jack Ilfrey escaped, returned to the group, and became one of its leading aces. 1st Lt. Robert N. Chenoweth was killed when his P-38, on a ferry flight from the UK to North Africa, crashed into a mountain at Ortigueira, Corunna, Spain, on 15 November 1942. By 13 November 1942, the group completed the move to Algeria, where they provided close air support and fighter protection against the Afrika Korps.

On 29 November 1942, the 94th Fighter Squadron flew the group's first combat sorties in the Mediterranean theater, strafing a German airfield and recording several aerial victories. However, as the year came to a close, the group's morale sagged. Though the move from England to the desert environment added sometimes 200–300 hours to the life of the liquid-cooled Allisons, few replacement parts and virtually no replacement aircraft were available. Col. Clifford R. Silliman, in charge of Lightning maintenance and repairs for the 1st, 12th and 14th fighter groups, recalled that no hangars, machine shops or service bays were available, forcing ground crews to make repairs in the open air. Crewmen were exposed not only to attack but to virtually incessant blowing sand and dust that continually fouled filters, breathers and lubricants. The searing sun was so intense that mechanics were unable to as much as touch the aluminum surfaces of the fuselage, wings and cowlings with exposed skin, Silliman said. The grating sand found its way not only into engine components and weapons but crewmens' bedding, footwear, clothing, hair, eyes and even their teeth. Pilots recorded some kills, but the loss ratio in air-to-air combat was even at best. For nearly a year, the group moved throughout Algeria and Tunisia, flying bomber escort and providing air coverage for the ground campaign. On 23 February 1943, the group began two days of low-level strafing missions in support of hard-pressed Allied troops at Kasserine Pass, losing several aircraft.

In April 1943 the Germans made several concerted attempts to reinforce the Afrika Korps using Ju 52 transports flown at wavetop level over the Mediterranean Sea, resulting in a series of interceptions by Allied aircraft and large numbers of transports destroyed. On 5 April, pilots of the 27th FS shot down 11, plus four Ju 87 Stukas and two Bf 109 escorts, losing two Lightnings. On 10 April, the 71st FS intercepted another large force escorted by 15 Macchi 200 and Fw 190 fighters, shooting down 20 transports and 8 of the escorts without loss to itself. The North African campaign ended with the capture of Tunis on 7 May 1943.

==== Markings and squadron codes ====
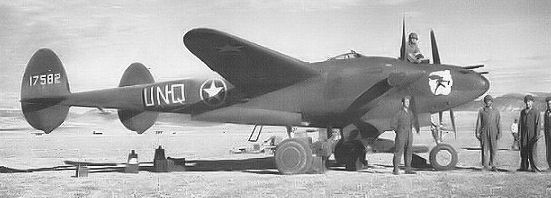
94th FS Lockheed P-38 Lightning in North Africa.

In 1943 the squadrons of the 1st Fighter Group began to apply distinctive colors to their tailbooms, wingtips and propeller tips for rapid unit identification. This was in addition to the fuselage letter codes assigned to the group by the Eighth Air Force which it continued to use when reassigned to the Twelfth Air Force in November 1942. The 27th FS used red (squadron code HV, radio callsign PETDOG), the 71st FS used white (squadron code LM, callsign CRAGMORE), and the 94th FS used yellow (squadron code UN, callsign SPRINGCAP). When the group began receiving P-38s in an unpainted aluminium finish in the spring of 1944, the 71st changed its color to black. Red spinners were also introduced sometime in 1944 to the entire group. During the time of the North Africa invasion, the national insignia was outlined in yellow, replaced by a star-and-bar outlined in red in early 1943. From May 1943 on the standard star-and-bar national insignia was used.

==== Italian operations ====
Six months of continuous combat in North Africa was followed by a short break, flying reconnaissance and escort missions around the Mediterranean. The respite ended on 15 August 1943, as air attacks increased against southern Italy in preparation for landings at Salerno. On 25 August, the 1st FG launched 65 P-38s, and joined with 85 other fighters, conducted a fighter-bomber attack against the airfield complex at Foggia. In addition to strafing ground targets, pilots of the 1st FG damaged or destroyed 88 German aircraft, with a loss of two P-38s. For this mission, the group received its first Distinguished Unit Citation (DUC). Five days later, on 30 August, the 1st Fighter Group earned its second DUC. The group flew 44 aircraft in escorting Martin B-26 Marauder bombers to the railroad marshalling yards at Aversa, Italy, and were opposed by approximately 75–100 German fighters. Outnumbered two to one, the group engaged the Luftwaffe for 40 minutes, enabling the bombers to strike their target and return to base without loss, but in doing so lost 13 fighters themselves, with 10 pilots killed.

The 1st Fighter Group became part of the newly created Fifteenth Air Force in December 1943 and moved to Italy, temporarily based at several airfields until its base at Salsola Airfield was ready on 8 January 1944. Living and supply conditions improved for the airmen, who received new P-38Js in the spring. On 16 April 1944, the group flew its 1,000th combat mission.

The 1st Fighter Group received its third DUC for an escort mission on 18 May 1944. Assigned to escort the force of 700 B-17 and B-24 bombers to the oil refineries at Ploieşti, Romania, bad weather caused roughly half the bombers to abort the mission. The 1st Fighter Group continued through the heavy weather to support B-17s that continued to the target and engaged 80 Luftwaffe and Romanian fighters attacking the Flying Fortresses. The group's 48 P-38s shot down and damaged nearly 20 aircraft for a loss of one P-38, and drove off the rest.

The minimal effect of high altitude bombing raids on the Ploieşti refineries prompted Fifteenth Air Force planners on 10 June 1944, to lay on a low level dive bombing attack by 48 P-38s of the 82nd Fighter Group and 45 of 1st FG. Mechanical turnbacks reduced the force by 21 aircraft, nine from the 1st Group. En route to the target much of the 1st FG was separated from the main force by a navigational error. Part of the 71st Fighter Squadron observed and attacked 6 Dornier Do 217 bombers but underestimated the numbers of Romanian IAR 80s escorting the bombers. Although six fighters and two bombers were credited as shot down, the 71st lost 9 Lightnings. When the 82nd FG arrived in the target area, along with the 27th Fighter Squadron and one flight of the 71st, they found the Ploieşti defense forces fully alert and a protective smoke screen concealing the targets. Flak shot down 7 P-38s during the attack, and 2 more were lost in strafing attacks on the return to Italy. After the attack, the 27th Fighter Squadron engaged 30–40 Bf 109s, claiming 4 destroyed, 2 probables, and 4 damaged, but lost 4 P-38s in the engagement. In all, the 1st Fighter Group had 14 P-38s shot down, its heaviest single day loss of the war, while claiming 18 kills, including five by a 71st pilot, 1st Lt. Herbert Hatch. The 82nd FG lost an additional 8 Lightnings.

From 10 to 21 August 1944, the 94th Fighter Squadron deployed sixty Lightnings to Aghione, Corsica, providing air support for the Allied invasion of Southern France. On an escort of a photo reconnaissance mission to Munich on 26 November 1944, the group lost an aircraft and pilot to an Me 262 jet.

The group's last major operation of the war came between 16 January and 19 February 1945. Under Operation Argonaut, the 1st FG escorted British and American delegations to the Yalta Conference, deploying 51 P-38's to protect the ships and aircraft carrying President Franklin D. Roosevelt, Prime Minister Winston Churchill, and their aides to and from the Crimea. The group changed bases shortly after its return to combat operations, moving to Lesina. There the 1st Fighter Group received two YP-80A jet fighters (serials 44-83028 and 44-83029) sent to the theater for operational testing ("Project Extraversion"). Although the jets were marked for combat operations with easily identifiable tail stripes and the letters 'A' and 'B' on their noses, and flown on two operational sorties by the 94th FS, neither saw combat before the end of the war.

On 15 April 1945, the 27th Fighter Squadron, which had scored the 1st Fighter Group's first kill of the war, also recorded the group's last aerial victory of World War II, during a mission in which 5 Lightnings were shot down strafing German airfields, with 4 pilots killed. Its final combat losses occurred on 23 April 1945, when three aircraft were shot down and a pilot, Capt. Clarence I. Knapp, killed in action.

During nearly three years of combat flying, from 31 August 1942, to 6 May 1945, the 1st Fighter Group flew over 21,000 sorties on 1,405 combat missions.

==== Aerial victories ====
The first aerial victory by a 1st Fighter Group pilot (and the first USAAF kill in the European Theater of Operations) occurred 14 August 1942, by a 27th Fighter Squadron pilot, 2nd Lt. Elza E. Shahan, stationed in Iceland, with the downing of an Fw 200C-3 Condor, a credit shared with a P-40C pilot of the 33rd Fighter Squadron. The final victory occurred 15 April 1945, by 1st Lt. Warren E. Danielson, also of the 27th Fighter Squadron, shooting down an Fw 190 near Regensburg.

The 1st Fighter Group had 402.5 claims credited for German aircraft destroyed in air-to-air combat recognized by U.S. Air Force Historical Study No. 85, with 17 pilots identified as aces. Among the various units of the 1st, the 27th Fighter Squadron had the most victories, with 83 pilots credited with 176.5 kills. The 94th Fighter Squadron was credited with 124 kills by 64 pilots and the 71st Fighter Squadron with 102 kills by 51 pilots.

The uneven distribution of kills among the squadrons is an apparent reflection of an unequal degree of contact with German fighter units after June 1944, almost all of which occurred in July 1944. Of the last 38 kills awarded to the 1st Fighter Group, 30 were by the 27th FS (24 in July, 2 in August 1944, and 4 in 1945). The 71st FS recorded only four, with the last occurring 21 October 1944, while the 94th recorded four in July 1944 and none thereafter.

Aces of the 1st Fighter Group
Pilot	Squadron	Credits	Aircraft flown
Capt. Thomas E. Maloney	27th Fighter Squadron	8	Maloney's Pony
1st Lt. Philip E. Tovrea, Jr.	27th Fighter Squadron	8	La Muñeca Plata
1st Lt. Jack M. Ilfrey^{1}	94th Fighter Squadron	7.5	Texas Terror
1st Lt. Meldrum L. Sears	71st Fighter Squadron	7	
Capt. Armour C. Miller	27th Fighter Squadron	6	Jinx serial no. 43-2872
1st Lt. Donald D. Kienholz	94th Fighter Squadron	6	Billy Joe/ Bar Fly/serial number:42-13460
Capt. Darrell G. Welch	27th Fighter Squadron	5	Sky Ranger
Capt. Newell O. Roberts	94th Fighter Squadron	5	
Capt. Joel Owens	27th Fighter Squadron	5	Daisy Mae
1st Lt. Daniel Kennedy	27th Fighter Squadron	5	Beantown Boys
1st Lt. John L. Wolford^{2}	27th Fighter Squadron	5	
1st Lt. Rodney W. Fisher	71st Fighter Squadron	5	
1st Lt. Lee V. Wiseman	71st Fighter Squadron	5	Spurly
1st Lt. Richard J. Lee	94th Fighter Squadron	5	
1st Lt. Everett Miller	94th Fighter Squadron	5	Martha J
2nd Lt. John A. MacKay	27th Fighter Squadron	5	Shoot, You're Faded
2nd Lt. Herbert B. Hatch	71st Fighter Squadron	5	Mon Amy
2nd Lt. Franklin C. Lathrope	94th Fighter Squadron	5	
^{1}Scored two more victories with another group.; ^{2}Killed in action.; Source:

=== Post-war air defense role ===
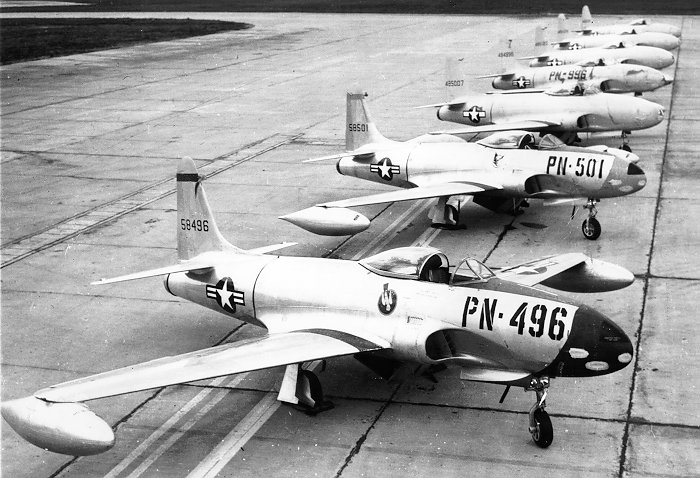
P-80B of 71st Fighter Squadron in foreground

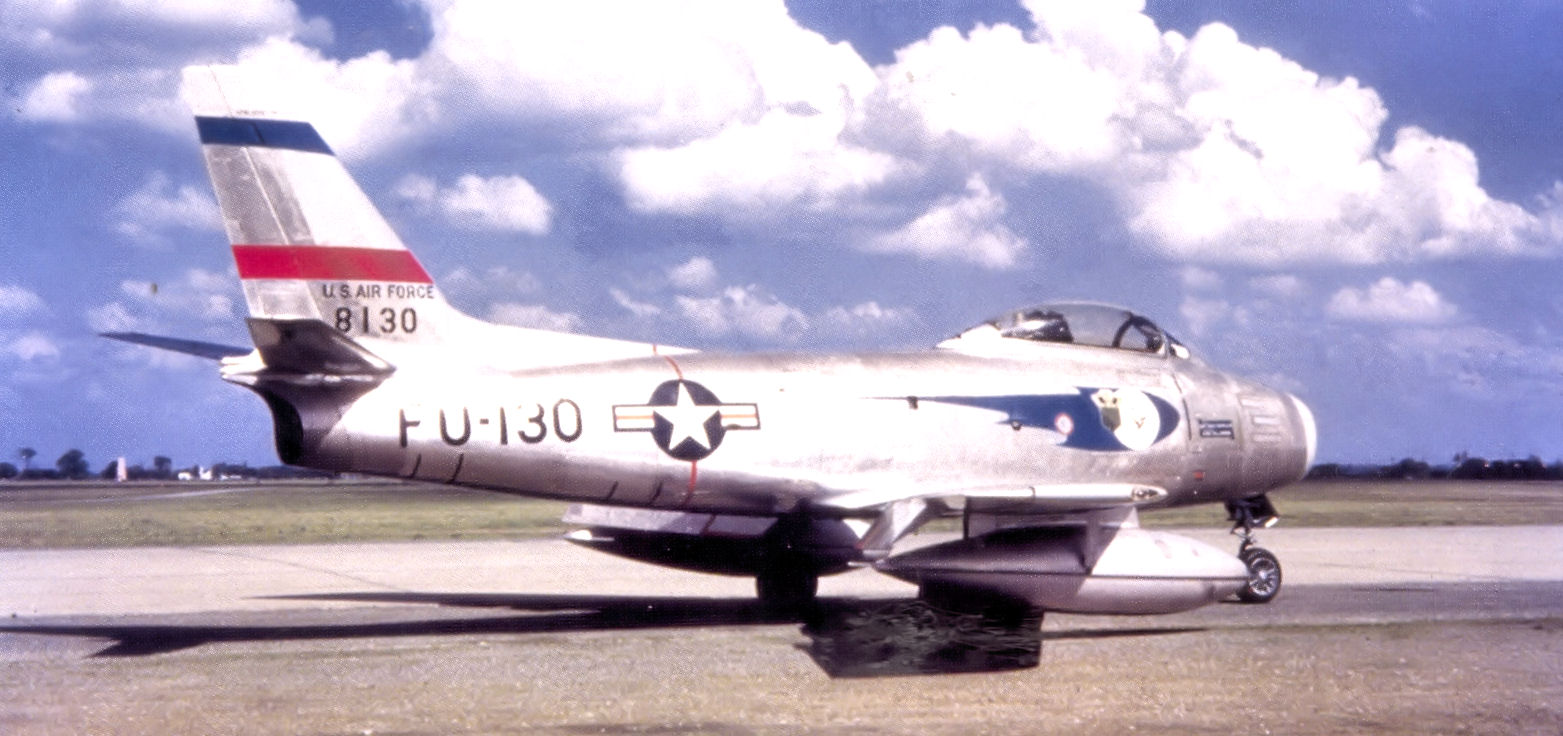
94th Fighter Squadron North American F-86A-5-NA Sabre 48-130 1st Fighter Group, March AFB California 1949. One of the first blocks of production F-86s assigned to an operational squadron

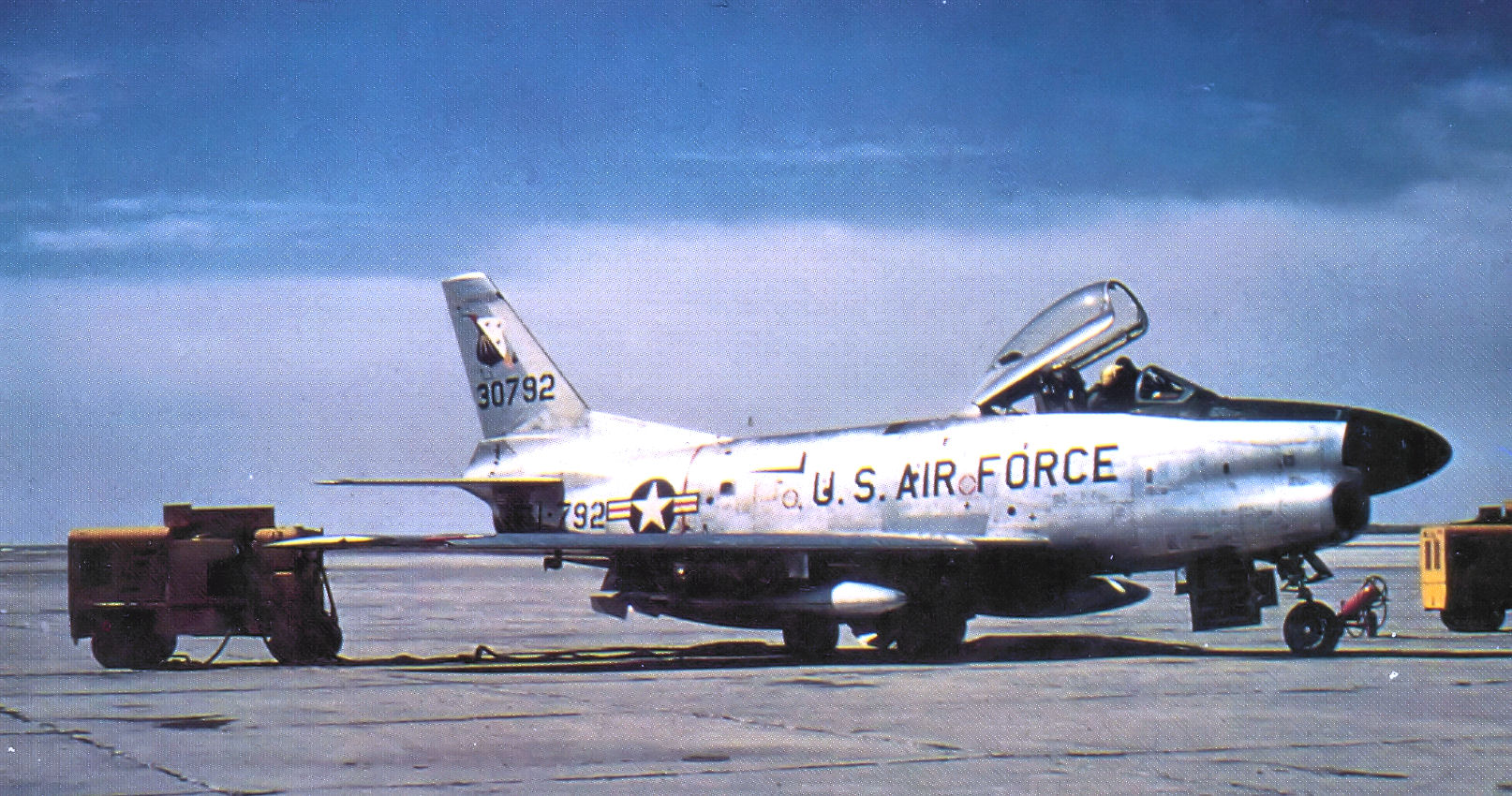
94th Fighter-Interceptor Squadron North American F-86D-60-NA Sabre 53-892 Selfridge AFB, Michigan, 1955

The 1st Fighter Group was inactivated 16 October 1945. In the post-war reorganization of the Army Air Forces, the group was reactivated as a P-80 Shooting Star group, replacing the inactivated 412th Fighter Group at March Field, California, on 3 July 1946, and receiving its personnel and equipment.

The Air Force became an independent service on 18 September 1947, and the 1st Fighter Group became part of the newly created 1st Fighter Wing. (See 1st Fighter Wing for command assignments.) During the summer of 1947, the Army Air Force implemented the Hobson Plan on a test basis, creating a self-sufficient wing at each base. As a result, on 15 August 1947, the 1st Fighter Wing was activated at March Field, California, and the 1st Fighter Group was assigned as its combat group. Administrative, maintenance and support, and medical functions were the responsibility of separate support groups. The test proved satisfactory and the Air Force implemented it for all its tactical wings.

The 1st Fighter Wing was re-equipped with F-86 fighters in 1949 and the group was redesignated 1st Fighter-Interceptor Group (FIG) in April of the following year. In January 1950, while stationed at George Air Force Base, California, the 1st Group formed an aerial demonstration team, the "Sabre Dancers." The team, composed of five pilots of the 27th Fighter-Interceptor Squadron (FIS), flew their most distinguished show on 22 April 1950, at Eglin Air Force Base, Florida, for an audience that included President Harry S Truman.

During the Korean War, the 1st Group served in an air defense role while the Wing's elements divided to provide defense for both coasts. The 1st FIG Headquarters, and the 27th and 71st FIS were temporarily detached to the Eastern Air Defense Force, while the Wing headquarters and the 94th Fighter Interceptor Squadron were assigned as part the Western Air Defense Force. The group was inactivated on 6 February 1952, in a general reorganization of all ADC units responding to ADC's difficulty under the existing wing base organizational structure in deploying fighter squadrons to best advantage. and its squadrons reassigned to other ADC headquarters.

In April 1955, the group's designation was changed to 1st Fighter Group (Air Defense) and it was reactivated in August as part of Air Defense Command. It replaced ADC's 575th Air Base (later Air Defense) Group which had been the USAF host for Selfridge AFB since 1 February 1952 and had commanded the fighter squadrons at Selfridge effective 13 February 1953. The 575th group replacement was part of "Project Arrow", an ADC program to reactivate historic units. Equipped first with radar equipped and Mighty Mouse rocket armed North American F-86D Sabre fighters, the group's 94th Fighter-Interceptor Squadron (FIS) upgraded to data link equipped F-86Ls for interception control through the Semi-Automatic Ground Environment system in 1956, followed by the 71st FIS in 1957. The 71st FIS transitioned to F-102 Delta Dagger aircraft the following year. The 71st retained its F-102s for only a year before converting to F-106 Delta Darts, while the 94th FIS retained its Sabres until converting directly to the F-106 in 1960. Until it was reassigned to the 1st Fighter Wing in 1956, it also served as the host organization for Selfridge AFB and was assigned a number of support organizations to fulfill this task. The group served as part of the 30th Air Division and the Detroit Air Defense Sector, based at Selfridge Air Force Base, before being reassigned as part of the 1st Fighter Wing (Air Defense) in 1956 and being inactivated on 1 February 1961.

=== 1st Operations Group ===
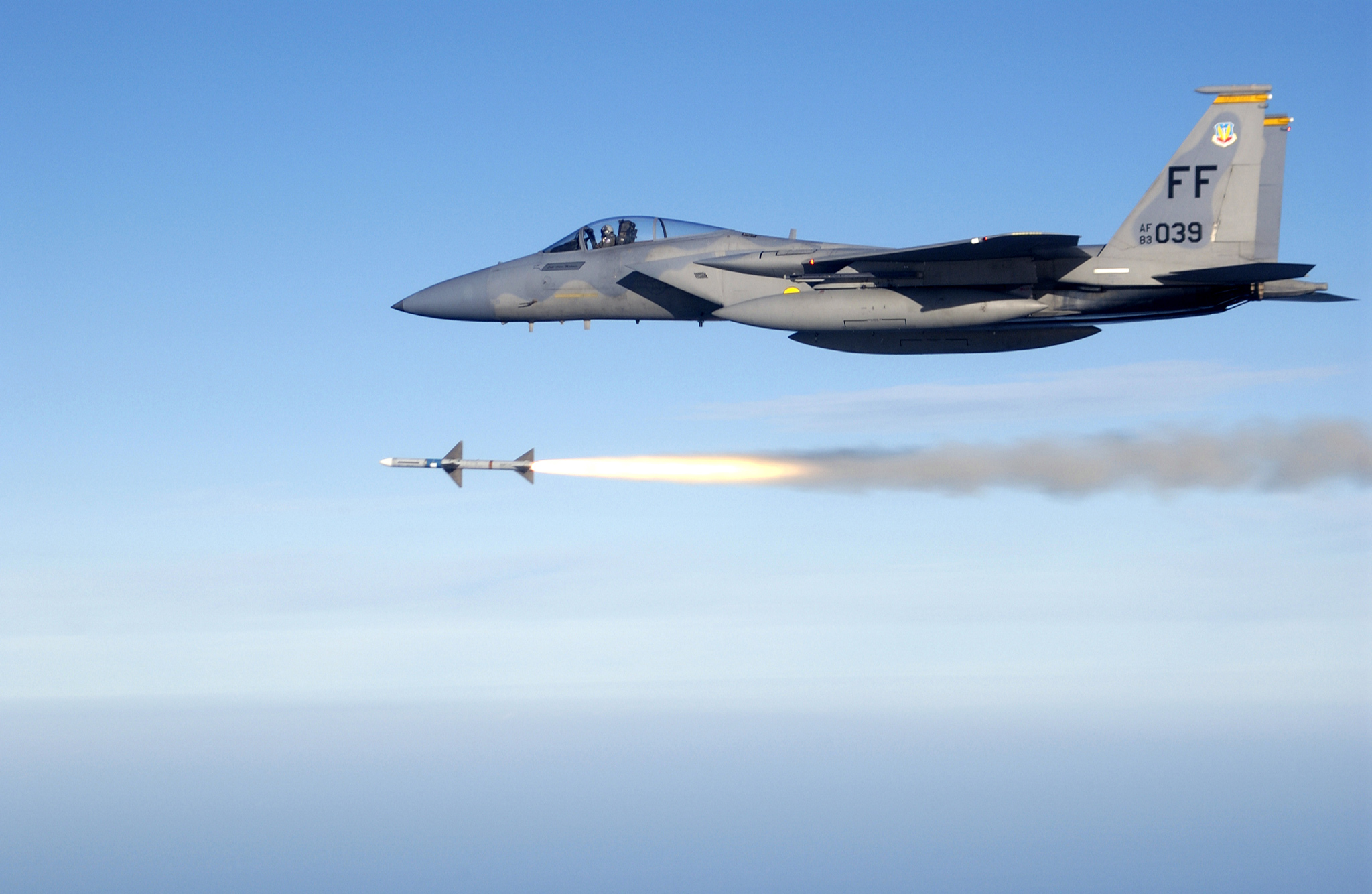
F-15C of 27th FS, 1st OG

On 1 October 1991, the 1st Tactical Fighter Wing was redesignated 1st Fighter Wing and the 1st Fighter Group reactivated as the 1st Operations Group to control its F-15 and operations support squadrons at Langley Air Force Base, Virginia as part of the implementation of the Air Force Objective Wing Reorganization.

On 15 March 1992, the 74th Air Control Squadron was transferred to the 1st Fighter Wing to provide command and control of air operations during deployments. On 1 February 1993, the 41st and 71st Rescue Squadrons, and the 741st Maintenance Squadron were also assigned to the 1st Fighter Wing. Stationed at Patrick AFB, Florida, the units provided search and rescue for NASA's space shuttle missions, and support of combat search and rescue operations in Southwest Asia. Additionally, C-21 operational support aircraft were assigned to the Wing on 1 April 1993, with the establishment of Detachment 1, 1st Operations Group. On 1 May, the detachment inactivated and the 12th Airlift Flight, with the same mission, activated.

On 14 June 1995, the 1st Rescue Group was activated as part of the 1st Fighter Wing and assumed operational control of the Search and Rescue organizations. On 1 April 1997, the 12th Airlift Flight was transferred to Air Mobility Command, leaving the group tasked with only fighter and air control operations.

In 2003 the 27th and 94th FS began transition to the F-22 Raptor, with the 94th FS reaching full operational status on 16 December 2005. Both the 27th FS and the 149th FS of the Virginia Air National Guard's 192nd Fighter Wing (integrated with the 1st Fighter Wing in operating and maintaining the 1st FW's forty F-22's) were declared fully operational by Air Combat Command on 15 December 2007.

=== Lineage ===
- Organized in France as 1st Pursuit Group on 5 May 1918

Demobilized in France on 24 December 1918

- Organized as 1st Pursuit Group on 22 August 1919

Redesignated: 1st Group (Pursuit) on 9 March 1921
Redesignated: 1st Pursuit Group on 25 January 1923

- Consolidated with the 1st Pursuit Group (World War I) on 8 April 1924

Redesignated: 1st Pursuit Group, Air Corps on 8 August 1926
Redesignated: 1st Pursuit Group on 1 September 1936
Redesignated: 1st Pursuit Group (Interceptor) on 6 December 1939
Redesignated: 1st Pursuit Group (Fighter) on 12 March 1941
Redesignated: 1st Fighter Group on 15 May 1942
Inactivated on 16 October 1945

- Activated on 3 July 1946.

Re-designated: 1st Fighter-Interceptor Group on 16 April 1950
Inactivated on 6 February 1952

- Redesignated: 1st Fighter Group (Air Defense) on 20 June 1955

Activated on 18 August 1955
Discontinued and inactivated on 1 February 1961

- Redesignated: 1st Tactical Fighter Group on 31 July 1985 (Remained inactive)
- Redesignated: 1st Operations Group and activated on 1 October 1991

=== Assignments ===
- Headquarters Air Service, AEF, 5 May 1918
- 1st Pursuit Wing, 30 August-9 December 1918
- 1st Air Depot, AEF, 9–24 December 1918
- Post Headquarters, Selfridge Field, Michigan, 22 August 1919
- Post Headquarters, Kelly Field, Texas, c. 31 August 1919
- Post Headquarters, Ellington Field, Texas, 1 July 1921
- Post Headquarters, Selfridge Field, Michigan, 1 July 1922
- 2d Wing, 1 March 1935
- 6th Pursuit Wing, 16 January 1941
- I Bomber Command, 5 September 1941
- Fourth Air Force, 9 December 1941

Attached to IV Interceptor Command, 22 December 1941 – January 1942

- IV Interceptor Command, January 1942
- VIII Fighter Command, 10 June 1942
- 6th Fighter Wing, 16 August 1942
- XII Fighter Command, 14 September 1942
- XII Bomber Command, 24 December 1942
- 7th Fighter (later, 47th) Bombardment Wing, 18 February 1943
- 5th Bombardment Wing, May 1943
- 2686th Medium Bombardment Wing (Provisional), 25 June 1943
- 42d Bombardment Wing, 24 August 1943
- XII Bomber Command, 1 September 1943
- 42d Bombardment Wing, 1 November 1943
- 5th Bombardment Wing, January 1944
- 306th Bombardment Wing, 27 March 1944
- 305th Fighter Wing (Provisional), September 1944
- 305th Bombardment Wing, June–October 1945
- Twelfth Air Force, 3 July 1946
- 1st Fighter (later, 1st Fighter-Interceptor) Wing, 15 August 1947 – 6 February 1952

Attached to: Eastern Air Defense Force, 15 August 1950 – 3 June 1951

- 4708th Air Defense Wing, 18 August 1955
- 30th Air Division, 8 July 1956
- 1st Fighter Wing, 18 October 1956 – 1 February 1961; 1 October 1991 – Present

=== Components ===
Squadrons

- 6th Airborne Command and Control Squadron: 1 October 1991 – 1 October 1992 (not operational after March 1992)
- 17th Pursuit Squadron: See 147th Aero Squadron
- 27th Aero Squadron (later 27th Squadron, 27th Pursuit Squadron; 27th Fighter Squadron, 27th Fighter-Interceptor Squadron, 27th Tactical Fighter Squadron, 27th Fighter Squadron): 2 June-24 December 1918, 22 August 1919 – 16 October 1945, 3 July 1946 – 6 February 1952 (detached after 15 August 1950), 1 October 1991 – present (detached 30 August—20 December 1994, 25 June–5 October 1996, 18 November 1997 – 10 January 1998, 13 August–8 October 1998, 9 June–9 Aug 1999, 9 June–9 September 2001)
- 41st Rescue Squadron: 1 February 1993 – 14 June 1995
- 71st Pursuit Squadron (later 71st Fighter Squadron, 71st Fighter-Interceptor Squadron, 71st Tactical Fighter Squadron, 71st Fighter Squadron, 71st Fighter Training Squadron): 1 January 1941 – 16 October 1945, 3 July 1946 – 6 February 1952 (detached after 15 January 1950), 18 August 1955 – 1 February 1961 1 October 1991 – 30 September 2010, August 2015 – present (detached 3 October 1995 – 10 January 1996, 28 June–2 October 1997, 6 October–16 December 1998, 7 December 2001 – 13 March 2002)
- 71st Rescue Squadron: 1 February 1993 – 14 June 1995
- 72nd Helicopter Squadron: 1 October 1992 - 30 December 1995.
- 94th Aero Squadron (later 94th Squadron, 94th Pursuit Squadron, 94th Fighter Squadron, 94th Fighter-Interceptor Squadron, 94th Tactical Fighter Squadron, 94th Fighter Squadron): 5 May–17 November 1918, 22 August 1919 – 16 October 1945, 3 July 1946 – 6 February 1952 (detached 13 October 1947 – 16 February 1948), 18 August 1955 – 1 February 1961, 1 October 1991 – present (detached 14 June–18 September 1992, 21 June–6 October 1995, 1 October–20 November 1997, 6 July–21 August 1998, 9 August–4 October 1999, 7 September–9 December 2001)
- 95th Aero Squadron (later 95th Squadron, 95th Pursuit Squadron: 5 May–24 December 1918, 22 August 1919 – June 1927
- 147th Aero Squadron (later 17th Squadron, 17th Pursuit Squadron): 2 June–24 December 1918, 22 August 1919 – 27 October 1940
- 185th Aero Squadron: 7 October–24 December 1918

Flights

- 11th Airlift Flight: 1 May 1993 – 1 April 97
- 72nd Helicopter Flight (later 72nd Helicopter Squadron): 1 November 1991 – 1 October 1992
- 4401st Helicopter Flight: 1 October–1 November 1991

=== Stations ===
- Gengault Aerodrome (Toul), France, 5 May 1918
- Touquin Aerodrome, France, 28 June 1918
- Saints Aerodrome, France, 9 July 1918
- Rembercourt Aerodrome, France, c. 1 September 1918
- Colombey-les-Belles Airdrome, France, c. 9–24 December 1918
- Selfridge Field, Michigan, 22 August 1919
- Kelly Field, Texas, c. 31 August 1919
- Ellington Field, Texas, 1 July 1921
- Selfridge Field, Michigan, 1 July 1922
- Naval Air Station North Island, San Diego, California, 9 December 1941
- Van Nuys Army Airfield, California, 1 February–May 1942
- RAF Goxhill (AAF-345), England, 10 June 1942
- RAF Ibsley (AAF-347), England, 24 August 1942
- Tafaraoui Airfield, Algeria, 13 November 1942
- Nouvion Airfield, Algeria, 20 November 1942
- Biskra Airfield, Algeria, 14 December 1942
- Chateau-dun-du-Rhumel Airfield, Algeria, February 1943
- Mateur Airfield, Tunisia, 29 June 1943
- Sardinia, 31 October 1943
- Gioia del Colle Airfield, Italy, c. 8 December 1943
- Salsola Airfield, Italy, 8 January 1944
- Vincenzo Airfield, Italy, 8 January 1945
- Salsola Airfield, Italy, 21 February 1945
- Lesina Airfield, Italy, March-16 October 1945
- March Field (later, AFB), California, 3 July 1946
- George AFB, California, 18 July 1950
- Griffiss AFB, New York, 15 August 1950
- George AFB, California, 4 June 1951
- Norton AFB, California, 1 December 1951 – 6 February 1952
- Selfridge AFB, Michigan, 18 August 1955 – 1 February 1961
- Langley AFB, Virginia, 1 October 1991 – Present

== Aircraft ==
- Nieuport 28, 1918
- Spad XIII, 1918
- Sopwith Camel, 1918
- During the period 1919–1941, used DH-4B, MB-3, P-1, PW-8, P-6, PT-3, P-16, PB-2, P-35, P-36, and P-43
- P-38 Lightning, 1941–1945
- F-80 Shooting Star, 1946–1952
- F-86 Sabre, 1946–1952; 1955–1960
- F-102 Delta Dagger, 1958–1960
- F-106 Delta Dart, 1960–1961
- F-15 Eagle, 1991–2010
- Boeing EC-135, 1991–1992
- CH-3A Sky King, 1993–1994
- HC-130E Hercules, 1993–1995
- C-21 Learjet, 1993–1997
- HH-60 Pave Hawk, 1994–1995
- F-22 Raptor, 2005 – present

== 1st FG P-38 on exhibit ==
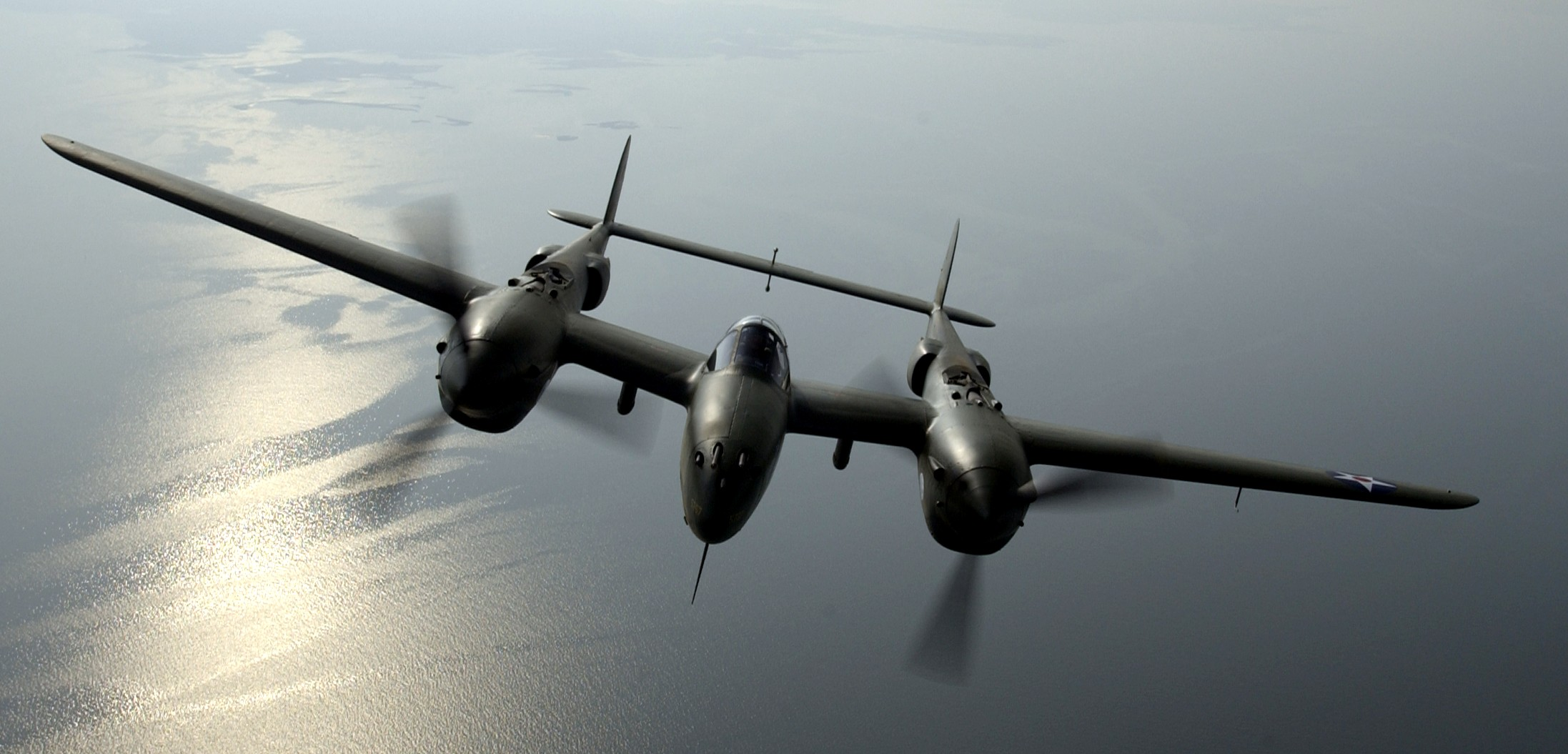
P-38 Glacier Girl near Langley AFB, Virginia, in 2004.

Beginning in 1977, at least a dozen different groups attempted to locate and recover one of the eight aircraft abandoned on the Greenland ice cap after the forced landing of 15 July 1942. One of the B-17s was located and found to have been crushed by the glacial forces. A P-38 in restoreable condition was then located in 1988 approximately 268 feet below the surface. Efforts to bring it to the surface began in May 1992, culminating in the recovery in October 1992 of P-38F-1-LO 41-7630, last flown by 1st Lt. Harry L. Smith, Jr., 94th Fighter Squadron.

The P-38 was subsequently restored to flying condition over the next ten years, dubbed Glacier Girl by its new owner, the Lost Squadron Museum, and flown on 26 October 2002. The P-38 (civil aviation number N17663) was stored at the museum's location in Middlesboro, Kentucky, until its sale to a private individual. A scale model kit of Glacier Girl was released by Academy Plastic Model Co.-Model Rectifier Corporation (Kit No. 12208) in July 2006.

== See also ==
- Organization of the Air Service of the American Expeditionary Force
- List of American aero squadrons
