= Stambaugh =

Stambaugh may refer to:

- Stambaugh (surname)
- Stambaugh, Kentucky
- Stambaugh, Michigan, a former city, now merged with the city of Iron River, Michigan
- Stambaugh Township, Michigan

== See also ==
- Camp Stambaugh (disambiguation)
