= Philip De Witt Ginder =

United States Army general

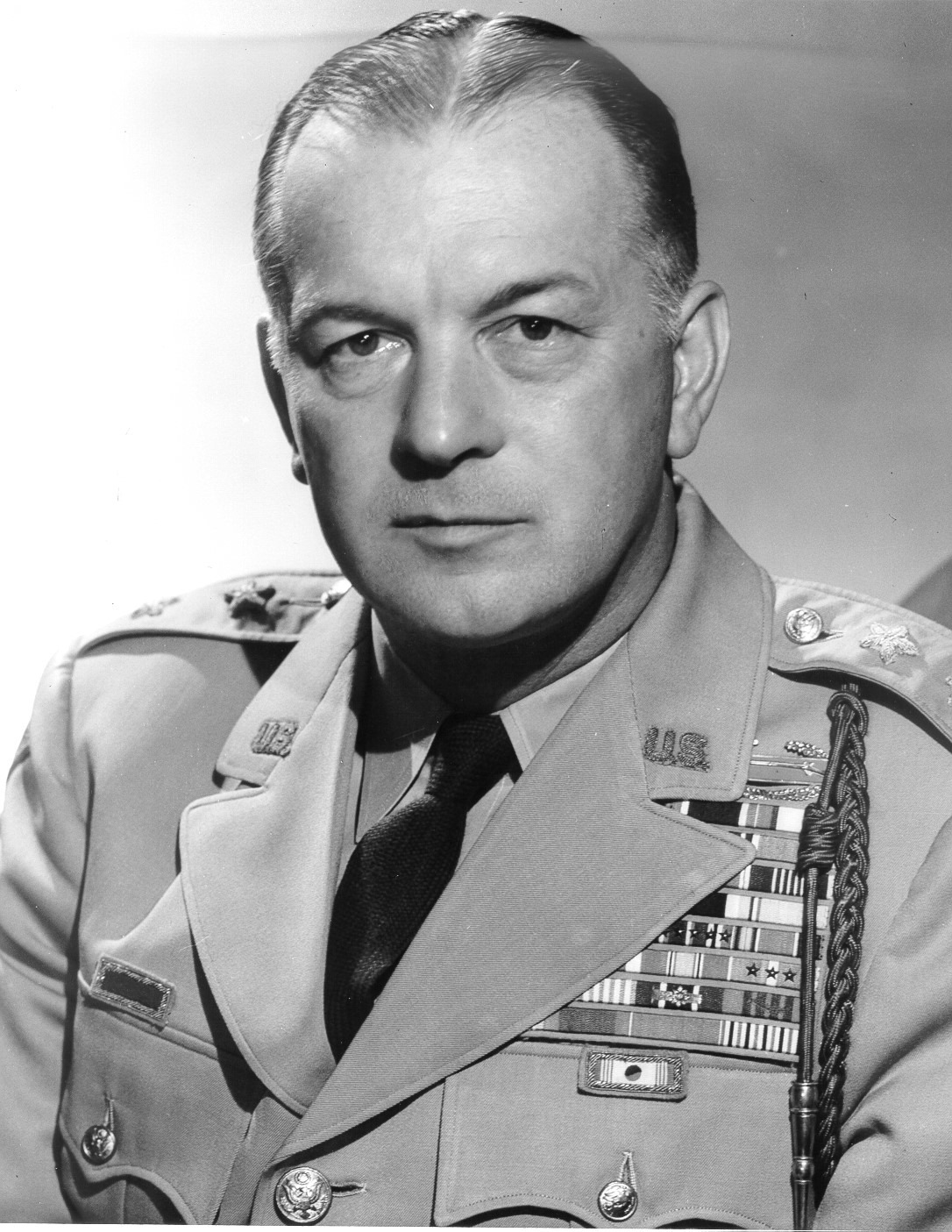
- Ginder, probably as commander of Fifth U.S. Army circa 1955
- Born: September 19, 1905; Plainfield, New Jersey, US
- Died: November 7, 1968 (aged 63); New York City, US
- Burial place: West Point Cemetery, West Point, New York; 41.39861°N 73.96671°W
- Spouse: Jean Dalrymple
- Military career
- Allegiance: United States
- Branch: United States Army
- Service years: 1927–1959
- Rank: Major General
- Service number: 0-16904
- Commands: Fifth United States Army; 10th Mountain Division; 37th Infantry Division; 45th Infantry Division; 6th Infantry Regiment; 9th Infantry Regiment; 357th Infantry Regiment
- Conflicts: World War II; Korean War
- Awards: Distinguished Service Cross; Army Distinguished Service Medal; Silver Star; Legion of Merit (2); Bronze Star Medal (3); Purple Heart

Philip De Witt Ginder (September 19, 1905 – November 7, 1968) was a career soldier in the United States Army. A highly decorated combat veteran, he rose to the rank of major general during the Korean War, while commanding the 45th Infantry Division. He was a recipient of the Distinguished Service Cross, the United States' second-highest military award.

== Early life ==
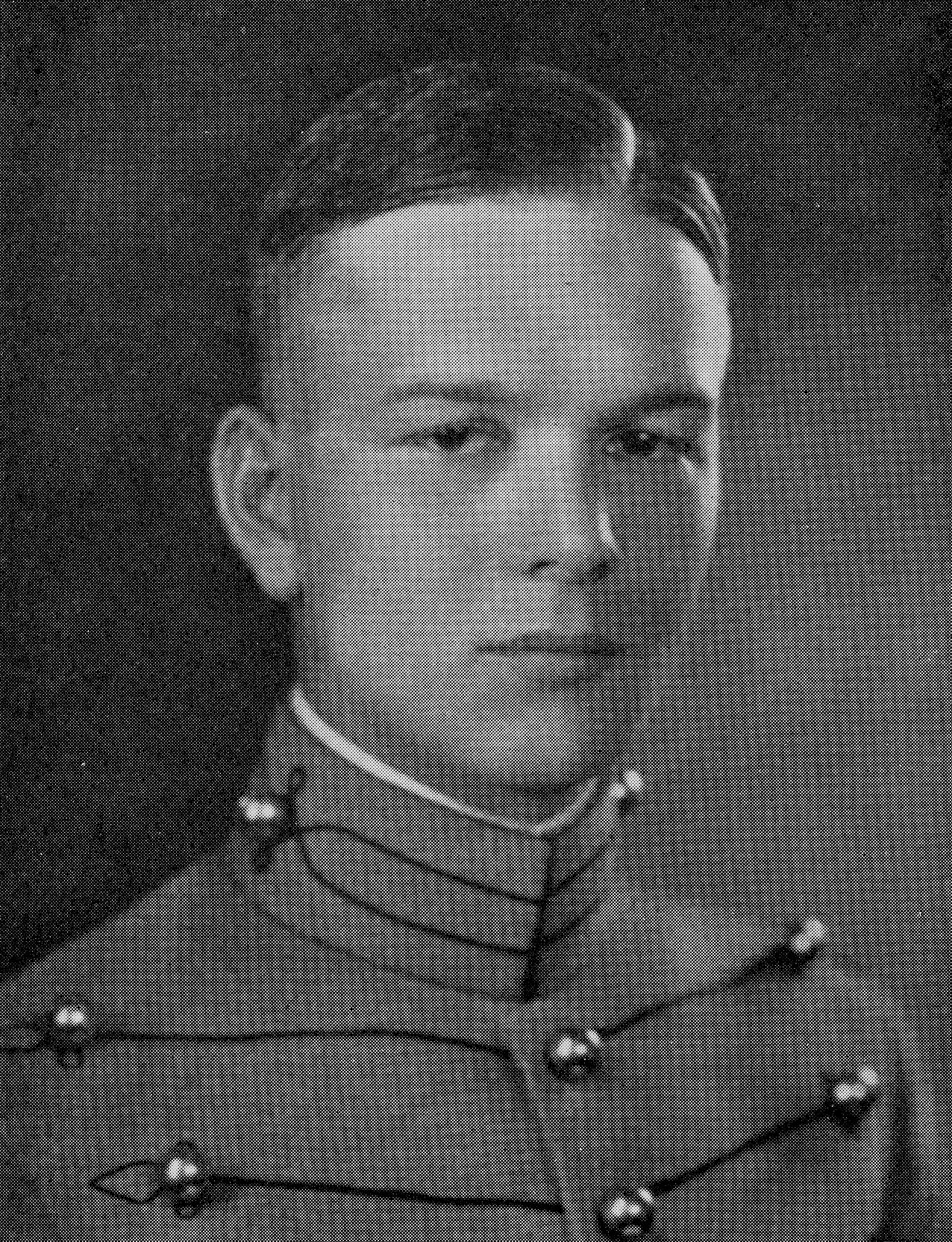
At West Point in 1927

Ginder was born on September 19, 1905, in Plainfield, New Jersey, the son of Grant D. and Emma Edith (Troxell) Ginder. He was raised in Scranton, Pennsylvania, and graduated from Scranton Central High School in 1923. In high school, Ginder was the senior class president, manager of the football team, and president of the school's athletic association.

Ginder passed a competitive examination for a Congressional appointment to the United States Military Academy offered by Representative Laurence Hawley Watres. He began attendance at West Point in 1923, graduated in 1927, and was ranked 171st of 293. Ginder's graduation was the subject of news headlines because he took his final exams after having undergone an emergency appendectomy just one day prior. At graduation, he received his commission as a second lieutenant of Infantry.

== Start of career ==
Ginder completed the infantry officer qualification course in 1933, and his early career included postings to: Fort Wadsworth, New York; Manila, Philippine Islands; Fort Benning, Georgia; Fort Missoula, Montana; and Schofield Barracks, Hawaii.

== World War II ==
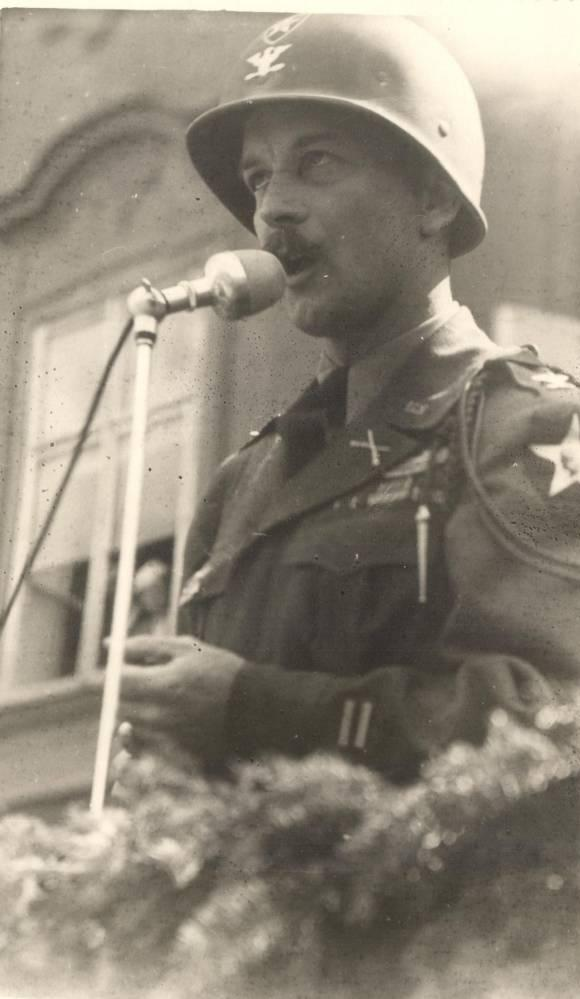
Ginder as colonel and commander of the 9th Infantry Regiment circa 1945.

During World War II, Ginder was the assistant chief of staff for personnel (G-1) for the Fourth United States Army. Appointed to command the 357th Infantry Regiment, a unit of the 90th Infantry Division, he was among the first ashore during the Normandy landings on D-Day, June 6, 1944. Ginder developed a reputation for subpar performance in combat, with observers and subordinates calling him "obtuse" and "full of boast and posturing." 357th veteran William E. DePuy called Ginder "as close to being incompetent as it is possible to be." Ginder was ultimately relieved of command during combat and escorted to the division command post under armed guard.

He was in command of the 9th Infantry Regiment when it captured the German town of Hürtgen as part of the Battle of Hürtgen Forest. It was for this action that he received the Distinguished Service Cross for actions on November 28, 1944, when he personally led his reserve company through the town in bitter house-to-house fighting while armed only with his pistol and a hand grenade. The citation for the DSC reads:

The President of the United States of America, authorized by Act of Congress, July 9, 1918, takes pleasure in presenting the Distinguished Service Cross to Colonel (Infantry) Philip DeWitt Ginder, United States Army, for extraordinary heroism in connection with military operations against an armed enemy while Commanding an Infantry Company of the 121st Infantry Regiment, 8th Infantry Division, in action against enemy forces on 28 November 1944, in Germany. Colonel Ginder personally led his reserve company of his battalion in an attack against a strongly defended town, when other attacking companies were pinned down by intense enemy small arms and mortar fire. With complete disregard for his own personal safety and armed only with his pistol and a hand grenade, Colonel Ginder courageously moved forward leading his men into the town despite the fierce enemy resistance. During the bitter house-to-house fighting that followed, Colonel Ginder through his personal courage and leadership, set an inspiring example which gave added encouragement to his men. Colonel Ginder's courageous actions, personal bravery and zealous devotion to duty exemplify the highest traditions of the military forces of the United States and reflect great credit upon himself, the 8th Infantry Division, and the United States Army.

Ginder was appointed the commanding officer of the 9th Infantry Regiment in the spring of the 1945, replacing Chester Hirschfelder. Ginder commanded the regiment until the end of the war, taking part in liberating the western part of Czechoslovakia, and ending the war in the town of Rokycany near Pilsen.

In addition to his DSC, Ginder was also awarded the Silver Star, "for conspicuous gallantry and intrepidity in connection with military operations against the enemy", and the Legion of Merit, "for exceptionally meritorious conduct in the performance of outstanding services to the Government of the United States" for his service during the war.

== Post-war service ==
From 1946 to 1949, Ginder attended the National War College and served in the Far East on the staff of General Douglas MacArthur. From 1949 to 1951, he served as senior military attaché in Prague, Czechoslovakia.

== Korean War and senior commands ==
Ginder commanded the 6th Infantry Regiment in Berlin from 1951 to 1952 and the 45th Infantry Division in Korea during 1953. He led the 37th Infantry Division at Fort Riley in 1954. From 1954 to 1955, he commanded the 10th Mountain Division, and he was succeeded by George E. Martin. Ginder commanded Fifth United States Army in 1955. He went to Korea as a colonel, and advanced to major general in less than two years, making him the youngest American general to command a combat division in Korea. His service in Korea included nearly 18 months spent north of the 38th parallel. His service there resulted in him being awarded with the Army Distinguished Service Medal, the citation for which reads:

The President of the United States of America, authorized by Act of Congress July 9, 1918, takes pleasure in presenting the Army Distinguished Service Medal to Major General Philip DeWitt Ginder (ASN: 0-16904), United States Army, for exceptionally meritorious and distinguished services to the Government of the United States, in a duty of great responsibility as Commanding General, 45th Infantry Division, in Korea, from 1952 to 1953.

After the Korean War, Ginder commanded Fort Polk, Fort Riley, Camp McCoy, the Fifth United States Army, and served in the office of the Chief of Staff of the United States Army as special assistant for Reserve and National Guard Forces. His final posting was to Governor's Island as deputy commander of First United States Army. He retired a major general in 1959, and was granted a Bronze Oak Leaf Cluster to his Legion of Merit, with the citation reading:

The President of the United States of America, authorized by Act of Congress, 20 July 1942, takes pleasure in presenting a Bronze Oak Leaf Cluster in lieu of a Second Award of the Legion of Merit to Major General Philip DeWitt Ginder (ASN: 0-16904), United States Army, for exceptionally meritorious conduct in the performance of outstanding services to the Government of the United States from January 1954 to May 1969.

== Post-military career ==
After his retirement from the army, Ginder was president of the Brazilian-American Export Company, and joined the boards of directors of several other companies.

Ginder died at New York City's Trafalgar Hospital on November 7, 1968, after suffering a cerebral hemorrhage. He was buried at West Point Cemetery, Section V, Row A, Site 41.

== Family ==
Ginder's first wife was Martha Calvert, whom he married in 1933, and with whom he had two daughters, Jean and Louise. They divorced in 1945. Ginder was next married to Jean Dalrymple, the head of the City Center Drama and Light Opera Companies, whom he met in 1951 while she was organizing United States participation at the Berlin Arts Festival on behalf of the United States Department of State.

== Decorations ==
Here is the ribbon bar of Major General Philip De Witt Ginder:

Combat Infantryman Badge
1st Row	Distinguished Service Cross			
2nd Row	Army Distinguished Service Medal	Silver Star	Legion of Merit with Oak Leaf Cluster	Bronze Star Medal with two Oak Leaf Clusters
3rd Row	Purple Heart	American Defense Service Medal	American Campaign Medal	European-African-Middle Eastern Campaign Medal with four service stars and Arrowhead device
4th Row	World War II Victory Medal	Army of Occupation Medal	National Defense Service Medal	Korean Service Medal with two service stars
5th Row	French Legion of Honour, Grade Officer	French Croix de Guerre 1939–1945 with Palm	Czechoslovak Order of the White Lion, 2nd Class	Czechoslovak War Cross 1939-1945
6th Row	Philippine Legion of Honor	Korean Order of Military Merit, 3rd Class	Order of the Patriotic War Second Class (Union of Soviet Socialist Republics)	United Nations Korea Medal
Presidential Unit Citation				Korean Presidential Unit Citation

== Sources ==
=== Internet ===
- "Memorial, Philip D. Ginder 1927". apps.westpointaog.org. West Point, NY: West Point Association of Graduates. November 7, 1968. Archived from the original on October 19, 2014.

=== Books ===
- McManus, John C. (2004). The Americans at Normandy: The Summer of 1944—The American War from the Normandy Beaches to Falaise. New York, NY: Tom Doherty Associates LLC. ISBN 978-0-765-31200-6.
