= Llewellyn Chilson =

US army soldier (1920-1981)

Llewellyn Morris Chilson
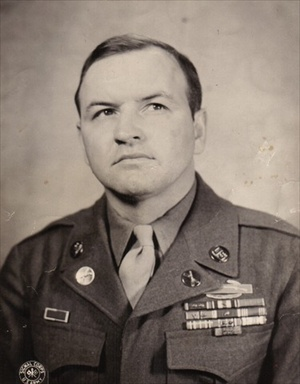
- Master Sergeant Llewellyn Chilson, U.S. Army
- Born: April 1, 1920; Dayton, Ohio, United States
- Died: October 2, 1981 (aged 61); Tampa, Florida, United States
- Burial place: Mountain View Memorial Park, Lakewood, Washington
- Military career
- Allegiance: United States
- Branch: United States Army
- Service years: 1942–1946; 1947–1964
- Rank: Master Sergeant
- Nickname: "Al"
- Units: Company G, 2nd Battalion, 179th Infantry Regiment, 45th Infantry Division
- Conflicts: World War II; Battle of Anzio
- Awards: Distinguished Service Cross (3); Silver Star (3); Legion of Merit; Bronze Star (2) with "V" Device; Army Commendation Medal; Purple Heart (3); Combat Infantryman Badge

Llewellyn Morris Chilson (April 1, 1920 – October 2, 1981) was a United States Army master sergeant and one of the most decorated American soldiers of World War II. He received twelve individual decorations for combat from the U.S. Army including seven decorations for valor. After the war, the President of the United States personally decorated Chilson with seven decorations including three Distinguished Services Crosses for extraordinary heroism in Germany.

== Early years ==
Llewellyn Chilson was born on April 1, 1920, in Dayton, Ohio. He was the second son of Frank and Goldia Chilson, his father a World War I veteran. The family moved to Akron, Ohio where his father worked as a bus driver. In 1930, his mother was struck and killed by a truck in front of their home. Chilson grew up on the rough streets of South Akron. He left South High School at age 16, taking a truck driving job hauling freight across the country. His older brother, Staff Sergeant Alvin M. Chilson, was killed in action serving with the 37th Infantry Division in the Philippines on February 16, 1945.

== Military career ==
=== World War II ===
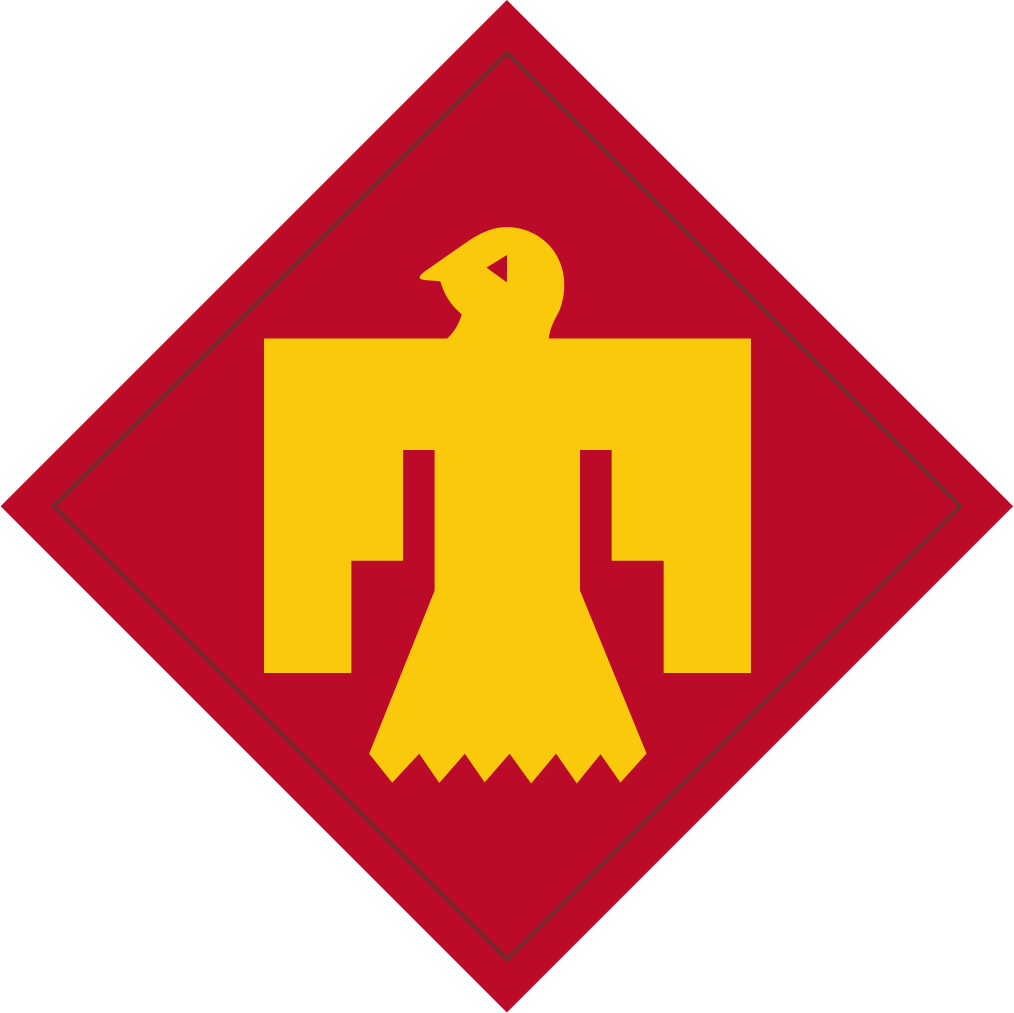
45th Infantry Division "Thunderbird" shoulder insignia

Chilson was inducted into the U.S. Army on March 28, 1942, during World War II. He reported to Fort Benjamin Harrison, Indiana for his basic training. After basic training, he was transferred to Camp Livingston, Louisiana for more training and then to Camp Johnson, Florida for amphibious training with the 112th Infantry Regiment. He was transferred to Fort Pickett, Virginia and the 45th Infantry Division ("Thunderbirds") in May 1942 and became a member of Anti-Tank Company, 2nd Battalion, 179th Infantry Regiment.

==== North Africa (Mediterranean Theater) ====
Chilson and his unit landed in Oran, Algeria on June 22, 1943, and prepared for the Invasion of Sicily (July 10, 1943).

==== Italy ====
During the Sicily campaign, Chilson received the Combat Infantryman Badge (later awarded the Bronze Star Medal based on award of the CIB) for combat actions on July 11 to 31, 1943. In February 1944, the 45th Division reinforced the beachhead at Anzio. He received a Purple Heart for being wounded by shrapnel near Carroceto, Italy on February 15, 1944. On February 16, near Aprilia, Italy, he and three other American soldiers were captured by German soldiers after running out of ammunition in a firefight and were made litter-bearers for the German forces. The four American soldiers managed to escape on February 17, taking four enemy prisoners with them. This then led to the capture of 40 enemy soldiers by Chilson. He was awarded a Silver Star.

==== Southern France (European Theater) ====
Chilson participated in the invasion of Southern France (Operation Dragoon) on August 15, 1944. He was transferred to Second Platoon, Company "G", 2nd Battalion, 179th Infantry. On October 28, he managed to capture a hill taking 25 enemy prisoners. He was awarded a second Silver Star (bronze oak leaf cluster) for actions near Denshein, France on November 26, 1944.

==== Northern France ====
Chilson was recommended for the Medal of Honor by Lt. William M. Owens, Second Platoon leader, for defending an indefensible position at Mulhausen near Gumbrechtshoffen, France, on November 30, 1944. On December 27, he became the platoon sergeant of Second Platoon, Company G.

==== Germany ====
Chilson was again recommended for the Medal of Honor for a series of heroic actions in Germany from March 26–31, 1945. This included his taking over 200 enemy prisoners. He was awarded a Distinguished Service Cross (for actions on March 26), a third Silver Star (2nd bronze oak leaf cluster), a Legion of Merit, and a Bronze Star Medal with "V" Device for these actions.

He was also awarded a second and third Distinguished Service Cross (1st and 2nd bronze oak leaf cluster) for his actions on April 25 and 27, and a Purple Heart (2nd bronze oak leaf cluster) for his wounds received on April 26, near Neuberg.

==== England ====
At the end of April 1945, Chilson was sent to and hospitalized in Stockbridge, England at the U.S. Army's 34th General Hospital stationed there. While hospitalized, he met a U.S. Army nurse named Mary Armstrong, whom he married later that year.

==== United States (American Theater) ====
He returned to Ft. Benjamin Harrison, Indiana in June 1945. He was honorably discharged from the U.S. Army on June 30, 1946.

=== Post-war ===
President Harry Truman personally decorated former T/Sgt. Llewellyn Chilson with seven individual combat decorations (six for valor) at a White House ceremony in the presence of Chilson's wife, baby daughter, and parents on December 6, 1946. Truman said, "This is the most remarkable list of citations I have ever seen. For any one of these, this young man is entitled to all the Country has to offer. These ought to be worth a Medal of Honor---that's what I think about it." Chilson had been recommended for the Medal of Honor, which was approved by General Joseph T. McNarney, the commanding general of the U.S. Forces in the European Theater. However, the War Department found Chilson's actions commendable, but not worthy of the Medal of Honor.

Chilson re-enlisted into the U.S. Army on November 17, 1947. He waived his 40% disability and became an Army Recruiter. In 1952, Chilson was sent to Fort Hood to help train National Guardsman and met legendary soldier Audie Murphy. Chilson was considered to be the second most decorated soldier of World War II by the National Guard Association. On May 24, 1961, Chilson was one of only four survivors of the crash of a USAF Douglas C-124A Globemaster II that killed 24.

He retired from the U.S. Army as a master sergeant in 1964.

== Later years and death ==
Chilson lived in Tacoma, Washington after he retired from the army where he managed a gas station and was a taxi cab driver. He later moved to Puyallup, Washington.

Chilson died at age 61 on October 2, 1981, while on vacation in Tampa, Florida. He is buried in the veterans section at Mountain View Memorial Park in Lakewood, Washington (Lakewood was incorporated in 1996) and is honored with a memorial dedicated to him.

== Military awards ==
Chilson's military awards and decorations include twelve individual decorations for combat he received from the U.S. Army for World War II: three Distinguished Service Crosses, three Silver Stars, one Legion of Merit, two Bronze Star Medals (one for heroism), and three Purple Hearts. Seven of the twelve medals are decorations for valor.

Chilson received the following military awards and decorations:

U.S. Awards & Decorations
Personal decorations
Distinguished Service Cross with two Bronze Oak Leaf Clusters
Silver Star with two Bronze Oak Leaf Clusters
Legion of Merit
Bronze Star Medal with "V" Device and one Bronze Oak Leaf Cluster
Purple Heart with two Bronze Oak Leaf Clusters
Army Commendation Medal
Unit awards
Army Presidential Unit Citation
Campaign & Service awards
Prisoner of War Medal
Army Good Conduct Medal
American Campaign Medal
European–African–Middle Eastern Campaign Medal with Arrowhead Device, one 3/16" Silver Star, and three 3/16" Bronze Stars
World War II Victory Medal
Army of Occupation Medal
National Defense Service Medal with one 3/16 Bronze Star
Badges and tabs
Combat Infantryman Badge
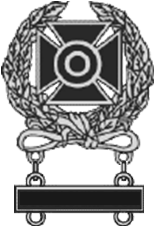
Expert Badge with Rifle Bar

Foreign Awards & Decorations
Unit awards
French Croix de Guerre with Palm (Unit Citation)

== Personal awards and honors ==
Chilson's personal awards and honors include:

- Ohio Medal of Valor (2006)
- Ohio Military Hall of Fame (2006)
- Washington Soldiers Home (Chilson Recreation Center/Memorial, 1983), Orting, Washington
- Military Order of the Purple Heart (Llewellyn M. Chilson Chapter 407), Lakewood, Washington
