= Henry E. Emerson =

US Army general

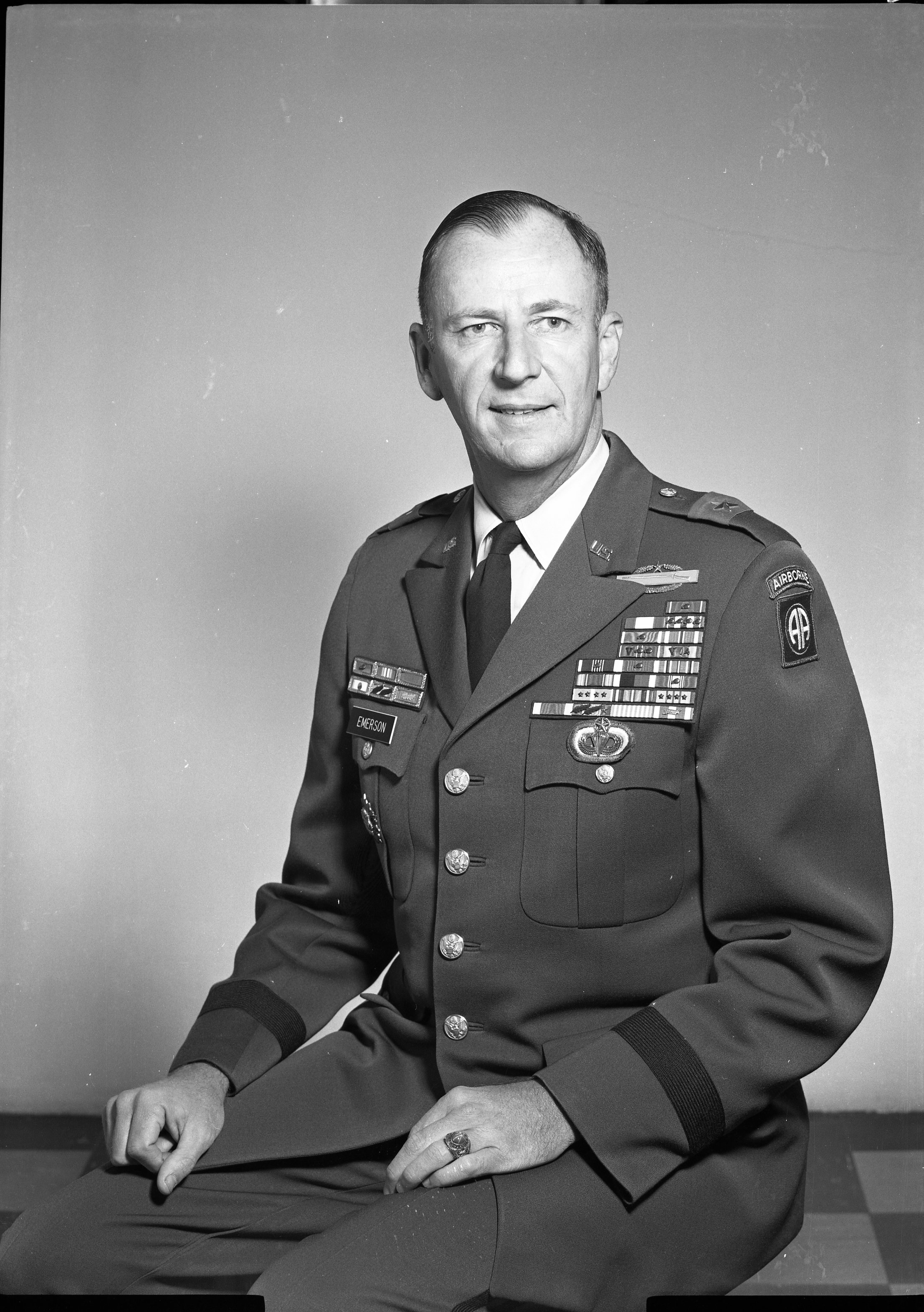
- Emerson as a Brigadier General c. 1970
- Born: May 28, 1925; Washington, D.C., U.S.
- Died: February 4, 2015 (aged 89); The Villages, Florida, U.S.
- Burial place: Arlington National Cemetery
- Military career
- Allegiance: United States
- Branch: United States Army
- Service years: 1943–1977
- Rank: Lieutenant General
- Nicknames: "Gunfighter", "Hank"
- Commands: XVIII Airborne Corps; 2nd Infantry Division; 1st Brigade, 9th Infantry Division
- Conflicts: Korean War; Vietnam War
- Awards: Distinguished Service Cross (2); Army Distinguished Service Medal (3); Silver Star (5); Legion of Merit (2); Distinguished Flying Cross; Bronze Star Medal (3); Purple Heart (2); Air Medal (14); Combat Infantryman Badge with Star (Second Award)

Henry Everett "Hank" Emerson (May 28, 1925 – February 4, 2015) was a United States Army lieutenant general. He is best known for having been the commander of the 2nd Infantry Division in South Korea during the mid-1970s, when Colin Powell served as a battalion commander. Emerson was a 1947 graduate of the United States Military Academy.

== Military career ==
Henry Everett Emerson gained recognition during the Vietnam War for his tactical ability on the battlefield. His tactics as a commander were novel. He conceived aerial reconnaissance and combat methods that were employed effectively against the Viet Cong. These included a "checkerboard concept" that involves small groups covering grid squares to seek out an enemy, "jitterbug" tactics which are complex manoeuvres using helicopters to surround an enemy. To the uninitiated this would seem jittery like the dance, and "Eagle Flights" which were helicopters loaded with local soldiers and flown in quickly to assist foreign troops in certain situations. He demonstrated that American soldiers could effectively "out-guerrilla" the Viet Cong. Emerson also developed the "seal-and-pile-on technique" (the rapid build-up of combat power to surround and destroy an enemy force). These highly complex tactics shattered many large enemy units.

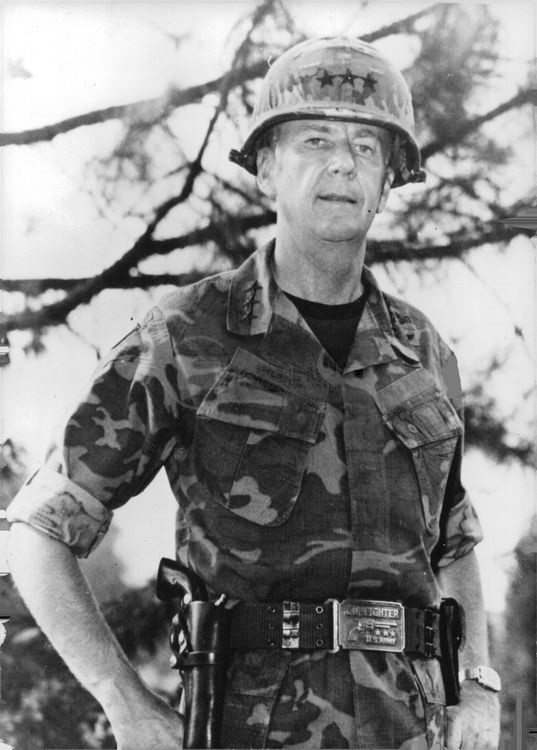
Emerson in 1975, with his non-standard six-shooter revolver.

Emerson was known for his somewhat eccentric personality, from his training methods to carrying a cowboy-style revolver in place of a regulation M1911 semi-automatic pistol. He was a believer in reverse-cycle training, during which troops trained at night and slept during the day. He also required that they watch the television film Brian's Song, to promote racial harmony. Colin Powell, who would later go on to become a four-star general and the U.S. Secretary of State, has stated that he and Emerson were very close and that what set Emerson apart was his great love of his soldiers and concern for their welfare. When Powell wrote his autobiography, "My American Journey", he dedicated an entire chapter to Emerson. Powell said that Emerson's leadership philosophy was "if we don't do our jobs right Soldiers will not win". In many instances when he was the XVIII Airborne Corps commander he would turn in the tag numbers of excessively speeding vehicles. The next morning, the violator(s) would be escorted by the company and battalion commanders from their unit and a verbal reprimand would be delivered by the brigade commander.

Emerson suffered severe burns after his helicopter was shot down in the Mekong Delta. He had commanded forces during the Vietnam War prior to being stationed in South Korea. He later served as commander of the XVIII Airborne Corps and Fort Bragg, from July 1975 to June 1977. He died at the age of 89 on February 4, 2015.

== Awards and honors ==
His awards include:

Combat Infantryman Badge (2nd Award)
Master Parachutist Badge
Distinguished Service Cross with bronze oak leaf cluster	Army Distinguished Service Medal with two bronze oak leaf clusters	Silver Star with four bronze oak leaf clusters
Legion of Merit with bronze oak leaf cluster	Distinguished Flying Cross	Bronze Star with Valor device and two bronze oak leaf clusters
Purple Heart with bronze oak leaf cluster	Air Medal with Valor device and Award numerals 14	Joint Service Commendation Medal
Army Commendation Medal with bronze oak leaf cluster	American Campaign Medal	World War II Victory Medal
Army of Occupation Medal with 'Japan' clasp	National Defense Service Medal with bronze service star	Korean Service Medal with four bronze campaign stars
Armed Forces Expeditionary Medal	Vietnam Service Medal with four bronze campaign stars	Korea Defense Service Medal (retroactive)
Knight of the National Order of Vietnam	Vietnam Cross of Gallantry with two palms	Fourth Class of the Order of Military Merit (Hwarang Medal)
United Nations Korea Medal	Vietnam Campaign Medal	Republic of Korea War Service Medal (retroactive)

Army Presidential Unit Citation with bronze oak leaf cluster	Valorous Unit Award	Army Meritorious Unit Commendation
Republic of Korea Presidential Unit Citation	Republic of Vietnam Gallantry Cross Unit Citation	Republic of Vietnam Civil Actions Unit Citation
