= Stambaugh (surname) =

Stambaugh is a surname. Notable people with the surname include:

- Isabel Stambaugh, United States Army nurse during World War I
- Melanie Stambaugh, American politician
- Wesley Stambaugh, Canadian Senator
- Robert F. Stambaugh, American economist
- John E. Stambaugh, American classical scholar
- Joan Stambaugh, American philosopher
