= Chester Hirschfelder =

United States Army officer (1894–1968)

Chester J. Hirschfelder
- Chester John Hirschfelder
- Born: January 10, 1894; Fort Wayne, Indiana, United States
- Died: August 24, 1968 (aged 74); Bexar County, Texas, U.S.
- Burial place: Fort Sam Houston National Cemetery, Texas, United States
- Military career
- Allegiance: United States
- Branch: United States Army
- Service years: 1909–1949
- Rank: Colonel
- Unit: Infantry Branch
- Commands: 9th Infantry Regiment; 16th Infantry Replacement Depot
- Conflicts: Philippine Insurrection; Mexican Expedition; World War I World War II
- Awards: Distinguished Service Cross (3); Silver Star (4); Legion of Merit; Bronze Star Medal (3); Purple Heart (2)

Colonel Chester John Hirschfelder (January 10, 1894 – August 24, 1968) was a career soldier in the United States Army. A decorated veteran of four wars, Hirschfelder was a three-time recipient of the Distinguished Service Cross and served as the commanding officer of the 9th Infantry Regiment during World War II.

== Early life and military career ==
Hirschfelder was born on January 10, 1894, in Fort Wayne, Indiana. In 1909, he enlisted in the United States Army as a private, and was assigned to Company I, 26th Infantry Regiment. Aged only 15 at the time of his enlistment, Hirschfelder changed his date of birth to 1891 in order to enlist, something which he would not correct until 1942. In eight years with the 26th Infantry, Hirschfelder rose to the rank to Sergeant and saw service in both the Philippine–American War and Pancho Villa Expedition.

== World War I ==
As a result of the expansion of the United States Army that was necessary during World War I, Hirschfelder was commissioned a Second lieutenant on July 11, 1917. He was assigned to the newly formed 5th Machine Gun Battalion, a unit within the 2nd Division's 3rd Infantry Brigade. Hirschfelder received promotions to both First Lieutenant and Captain during World War I. While serving with the battalion, Captain Hirschfelder earned two Silver Star's, and the first of three Distinguished Service Crosses for single-handedly silencing an enemy machine gun position with grenades.

== Interwar period ==
After serving briefly during the occupation of Germany, Hirschfelder and the 2nd Division returned to the United States. Hirschfelder was commissioned a First lieutenant of Infantry within the Regular Army on July 1, 1920. He was later promoted to Captain, with the same date of rank, and assigned to the 9th Infantry Regiment. He graduated from the Company Officers Course at the United States Army Infantry School in 1923. Like many in the interwar Regular Army, Hirschfelder advanced slowly, only receiving promotions to Major and Lieutenant Colonel in 1935 and 1940 respectively. At the outset of World War II, he was serving as a Lieutenant Colonel within the 9th Infantry Regiment.

== World War II ==
Hirschfelder was transferred to the 352nd Infantry Regiment of the 88th Infantry Division in January 1942, to serve as the executive officer. He served in this role until February 1942, when the regiment was disbanded upon the reorganization of the division. In July of that year, he was reassigned to the 9th Infantry Regiment as the commanding officer, with the rank of Colonel. As commander of the 9th Infantry, Hirschfelder led the regiment during their landing and subsequent combat during Operation Overlord. During a five-day period from July 28 to August 2, Hirschfelder was awarded his second and third Distinguished Service Crosses.

He continued in command of the 9th Infantry Regiment during the Siegfried Line campaign and during the Battle of the Bulge. Hirschfelder was replaced as commanding officer on January 10, 1945, by Colonel Philip De Witt Ginder, a veteran of the 8th and 90th Infantry Divisions, and briefly returned to the United States. He returned to Europe that March, to serve as the executive officer of the 17th Infantry Replacement Depot in France. That April, he was made commander of the 16th Infantry Replacement Depot, which he commanded until that June.

== Postwar and retirement ==
After returning to the United States in August 1945, Colonel Hirschfelder was a patient at Brooke General Hospital in Fort Sam Houston, Texas until January 1946. That June, he was assigned to the War Department Manpower Board in Dallas and San Antonio. Later that August, he began an assignment as the executive officer of Fort Sam Houston, for which he would serve until July 1948. After a brief stint at Fort Amador in Panama, Hirschfelder returned to Fort Sam Houston in May 1949, serving as the Acting Inspector General of the post until his retirement on the 1st of August.

== Personal life and death ==
Chester Hirschfelder was married to Ethel Leona Thomas Hirschfelder (1895–1987) until his death on August 24, 1968. He was interred at Fort Sam Houston National Cemetery in San Antonio, Texas, where his wife was also laid to rest in 1987.

== Awards and decorations ==
U.S. Awards & Decorations
Personal decorations
Distinguished Service Cross with two bronze oak leaf clusters
Silver Star with three bronze oak leaf clusters
Legion of Merit
Bronze Star Medal with "V" device and three bronze oak leaf clusters
Purple Heart with bronze oak leaf cluster
Unit awards
Presidential Unit Citation with two bronze oak leaf clusters
Campaign & Service awards
Mexican Service Medal
World War I Victory Medal with silver battle clasp
American Defense Service Medal with service star
American Campaign Medal
European–African–Middle Eastern Campaign Medal with Arrowhead device and silver campaign star
World War II Victory Medal
Badges and tabs
Combat Infantryman Badge
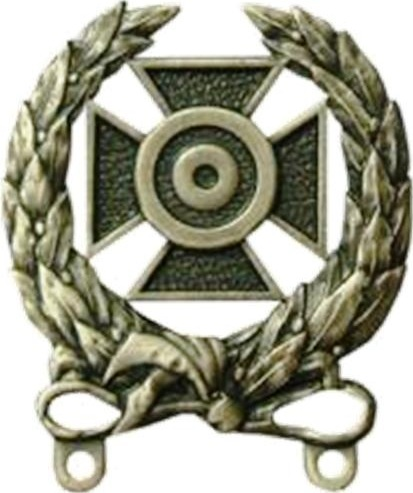
Army Marksmanship badge

Foreign Awards & Decorations
Personal decorations
Knight of the French Legion of Honour
French Croix de Guerre with Palm
British Distinguished Service Order
Unit awards
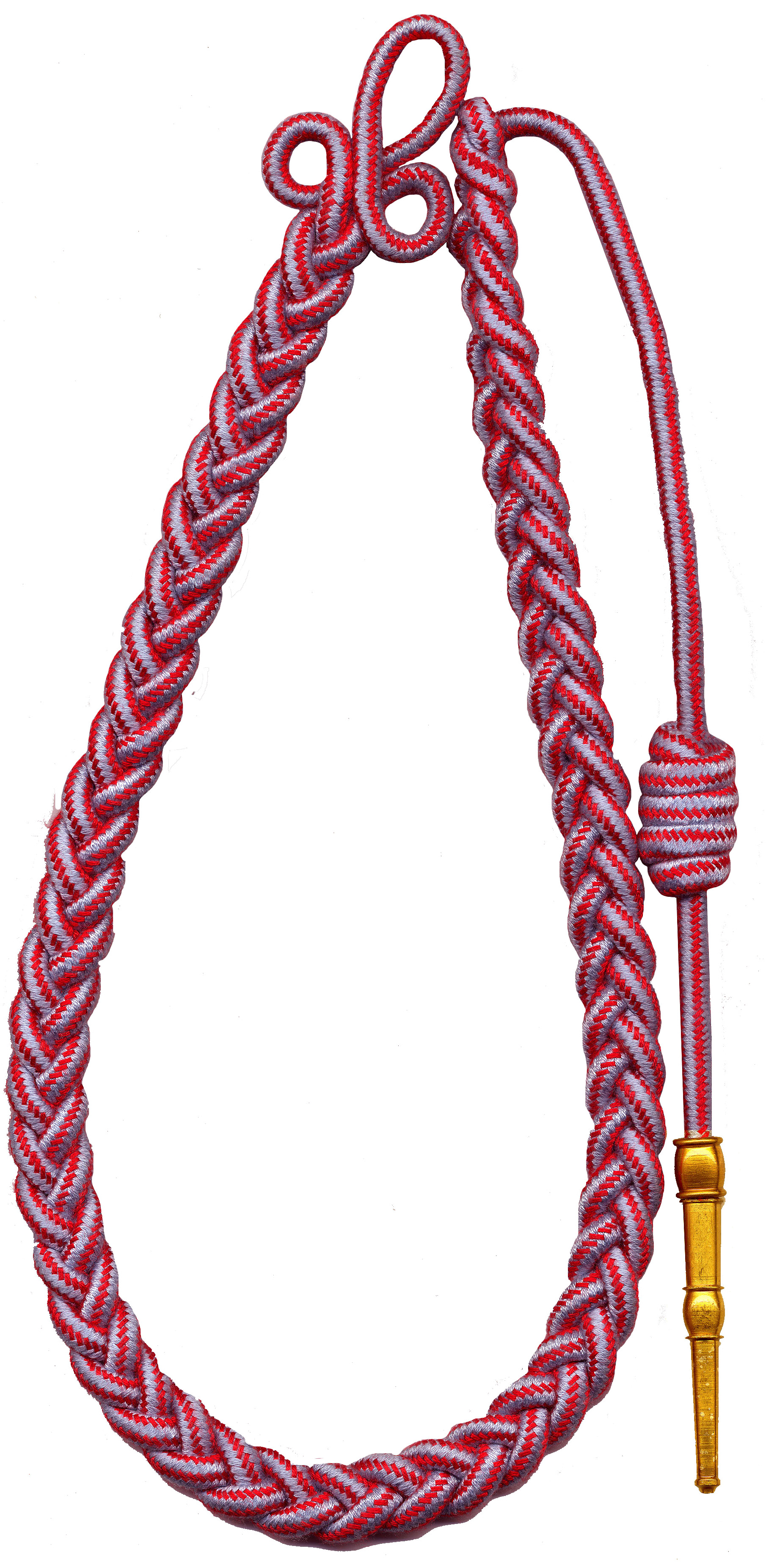
French Fourragère

== Dates of rank ==
Insignia	Rank	Component	Date
Various	Enlisted	Regular Army	November 29, 1909
	Second lieutenant	National Army	November 13, 1909
	First lieutenant	National Army	January 15, 1918
	Captain	National Army	July 29, 1918
	First lieutenant	Regular Army	July 1, 1920
	Captain	Regular Army	July 1, 1920
	Major	Regular Army	August 1, 1935
	Lieutenant colonel	Regular Army	July 13, 1940
	Colonel	Army of the United States	August 19, 1942
	Colonel	Regular Army	February 1, 1946
	Colonel	Retired List	August 1, 1949
