= Jean Dalrymple =

American dramatist (1902–1998)

Jean Dalrymple

Jean Van Kirk Dalrymple (September 2, 1902 – November 15, 1998) was an American theater producer, manager, publicist, and playwright. She was instrumental in the founding of New York City Center, and is best known for her productions there.

== Biography ==
Dalrymple was born in Morristown, New Jersey on September 2, 1902 to an affluent couple, George, a coal and lumberyard owner, and Elizabeth (née VanKirk) Dalrymple. Attended to by the Victorian household nurse, Jean learned to read, write and type at home. When she was 9, a short story she wrote was published by a Newark newspaper. Her schooling consisted of one year of eighth grade, as women were not encouraged to complete high school at the time.

Instead, she completed a business course and worked as a stenographer on Wall Street at age 16. Her new social circle embraced vaudeville theater. Although she had no aspirations for a theater career, she was asked to replace an actress and entered the vaudeville Keith-Albee-Orpheum circuit with boyfriend (future Hollywood screen writer) Dan Jarrett. After touring the United States acting and writing vaudeville sketches, she and Dan wrote Just a Pal. For another sketch The Woman Pays, Jean and Dan hired Archibald Leach, a handsome young man with a British accent but no acting experience, whom they saw walking on stilts at Coney Island; he would later be known as Cary Grant. As vaudeville lost audiences to the "talkies" (movies with sound), Jean was asked to write and produce a series of comedic sketches, or "talkie shorts", for FitzPatrick Pictures, for which she was able to cast many old friends. She then wrote a play, Salt Water, that attracted the interest of theater producer John L. Golden.

Dalrymple served on the board of City Center; and in the 1980s was president of the Light Opera of Manhattan. At City Center, she produced revivals of Our Town, Porgy and Bess, Othello (starring Paul Robeson and Jose Ferrer), A Streetcar Named Desire (starring Uta Hagen and Anthony Quinn), Pal Joey (with Bob Fosse and Viveca Lindfors), King Lear (with Orson Welles), and many others.

== Writings ==
Dalrymple's written works include The Quiet Room: a play in three acts (1958); September Child: the story of Jean Dalrymple (1963 autobiography); Careers and Opportunities in the Theatre (1969), From The Last Row: A personal account of the first twenty-five years of the New York City Center of Music and Drama and Jean Dalrymple's Pinafore Farm Cookbook (1972).

== Personal life ==
In 1932, Dalrymple married New York Sun theater critic Ward Morehouse. That marriage ended in divorce. In 1951, she married Major General Philip De Witt Ginder. She had no children and left no immediate survivors.

== Death ==
Dalrymple died in 1998 at her apartment on West 55th Street, across the street from City Center Theater, aged 96, following a battle with cancer.

She is buried at West Point Cemetery, next to her second husband.
