= Camp Stambaugh =

Camp Stambaugh may be:

- Camp Stambaugh (Ohio)
- Camp Stambaugh (Wyoming)
