= Distinguished Service Cross (United States) =

US Army's second highest medal

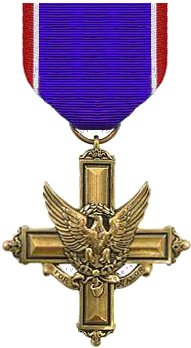
- Type: Service cross medal
- Awarded for: Extraordinary heroism in combat
- Presented by: United States Department of the Army
- Eligibility: United States Army soldiers
- Status: Currently awarded
- First award: 18 March 1918

Highlights
- Total: 13,462
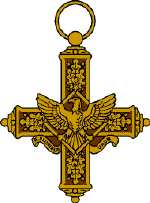
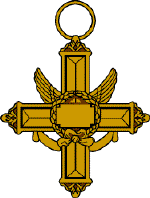
- Service Ribbon (above); Obverse of the original cross & Reverse of current cross (below)

Precedence
- Next (higher): Medal of Honor
- Equivalent: USN & USMC: Navy Cross; USAF & USSF: Air Force Cross; USCG: Coast Guard Cross; Unit award: Presidential Unit Citation; Civilian: Secretary of Defense Medal for Valor
- Next (lower): Department of Defense: Defense Distinguished Service Medal; Department of Homeland Security: Homeland Security Distinguished Service Medal

The Distinguished Service Cross (DSC) is the United States Army's second highest military decoration for soldiers who display extraordinary heroism in combat with an armed enemy force. Actions that merit the Distinguished Service Cross must be of such a high degree that they are above those required for all other U.S. combat decorations, but which do not meet the criteria for the Medal of Honor. The Army Distinguished Service Cross is equivalent to the Navy Cross of the United States naval services, the Air Force Cross of the United States Air Force and Space Force, and the Coast Guard Cross of the United States Coast Guard; collectively, these awards are known as the "service crosses". Prior to the creation of the Air Force Cross in 1960, airmen were awarded the Distinguished Service Cross.

The Distinguished Service Cross was first awarded during World War I. In addition, a number of awards were bestowed for actions which took place before World War I. In many cases, the medal was awarded to soldiers who had received a Certificate of Merit for gallantry; at the time, this certificate was the only other honor for gallantry the Army could present to combatants in lieu of a Medal of Honor. Others were furnished in belated recognition of actions which occurred in the Philippine–American War, during the Boxer Rebellion, and Pancho Villa Expedition.

The Distinguished Service Cross is distinct from the Distinguished Service Medal, which is awarded to Army soldiers in recognition of exceptionally meritorious service to the government of the United States in a duty of great responsibility. The Distinguished Service Cross is only awarded for actions in combat, while the Distinguished Service Medal has no such restriction.

== Description ==
A cross of bronze, 2 inches (5.1 cm) high and 1 13/16 inches (46 mm) wide with an eagle on the center and a scroll below the eagle bearing the inscription "FOR VALOR". On the reverse side, the center of the cross is circled by a wreath with a space for engraving the name of the recipient.

== Service ribbon ==
The service ribbon is 1 3/8 inches (35 mm) wide and consists of the following stripes:

- 1/8 inch (3.2 mm) Old Glory Red 67156;
- 1/16 inch (1.6 mm) White 67101;
- 1 inch (25 mm) Imperial Blue 67175;
- 1/16 inch (1.6 mm) White;
- 1/8 inch (3.2 mm) Old Glory Red.

== Criteria ==
The Distinguished Service Cross is awarded to a person who, while serving in any capacity with the Army (or in the Air Force, before 1960), distinguishes themselves by extraordinary heroism not justifying the award of a Medal of Honor; while engaged in an action against an enemy of the United States; while engaged in military operations involving conflict with an opposing/foreign force; or while serving with friendly foreign forces engaged in an armed conflict against an opposing armed force in which the United States is not a belligerent party. The act or acts of heroism must have been so notable and have involved risk of life so extraordinary as to set the individual apart from their comrades.

== Components ==
The following are authorized components of the Distinguished Service Cross:

1. Decoration (regular size): MIL-D-3943/4. NSN 8455-00-269-5745 for decoration set. NSN 8455-00-246-3827 for individual replacement medal.
2. Decoration (miniature size): MIL-D-3943/4. NSN 8455-00-996-50007.
3. Ribbon: MIL-R-11589/50. NSN 8455-00-252-9919.
4. Lapel Button (a colored enameled replica of service ribbon): MIL-L-11484/1. NSN 8455-00-253-0808.

Additional awards of the Army Distinguished Service Cross are denoted with oak leaf clusters.

== Background ==
The Distinguished Service Cross was established by President Woodrow Wilson on January 2, 1918. General John J. Pershing, commander-in-chief of the expeditionary forces in France, had recommended that recognition other than the Medal of Honor be authorized for the United States Army for valorous service rendered in like manner to that awarded by the European armies. The request for the establishment of the medal was forwarded from the secretary of war to the president in a letter dated December 28, 1917. The act of Congress establishing this award (193-65th Congress), dated July 9, 1918, is contained in 10 U.S.C. § 3742. The establishment of the Distinguished Service Cross was promulgated in War Department General Order No. 6, dated January 12, 1918.

The first style of the Distinguished Service Cross was designed by Captain Aymar E. Embury II, Engineers Officer Reserve Corps, and World War I artist Lieutenant J. Andre Smith. The first medals were struck by the United States Mint from a sculpture by Gaetano Cecere, who went on to design the Soldier's Medal. It was decided that minor changes were needed to make the medal more attractive. In light of the urgency in supplying the decorations to General Pershing, the first one hundred medals were struck from the original design. They were sent on the understanding that replacements in the second design (also numbered from 1 to 100) would be provided once they were available. Embury made the modifications with the plaster model for the second (and current) version made by John R. Sinnock, who also sculpted various other medals, including the Purple Heart.

Army Regulation (AR) 670–1, governing the wear and appearance of army uniforms and insignia, and its associated guide specify that the Distinguished Service Cross appears second in the order of precedence of U.S. military decorations, preceded only by the Medal of Honor. Policy for awards, approving authority, supply, and issue of decorations is contained in AR 600-8-22. 10 U.S.C. § 3991 provides for a 10% increase in retired pay for enlisted personnel who have been awarded the Distinguished Service Cross and retired with more than 20 years of service.

== Awarding history ==
=== World War I ===
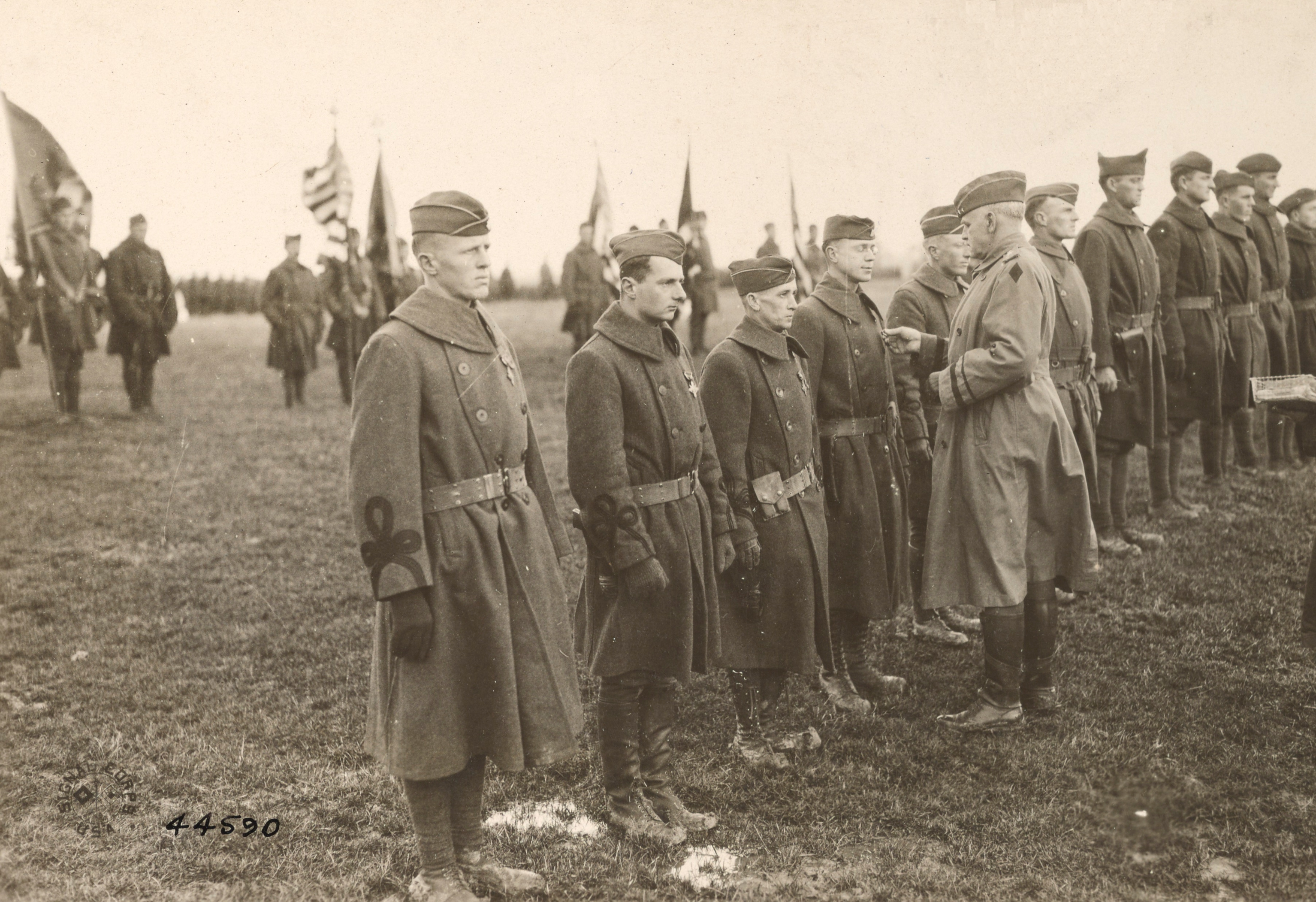
Major General Hanson Edward Ely, commanding the 5th Division, pinning the Distinguished Service Cross on Captain Howard R. MacAdams of the 5th Division's 7th Engineer Regiment, Esch, Luxembourg, December 30, 1918.

During World War I, 6,309 awards of the Distinguished Service Cross were made to 6,185 recipients. Several dozen Army soldiers, as well as eight marines and two French Army officers, received two Distinguished Service Crosses. The first awards were made on March 18, 1918, to 3 soldiers of the 1st Infantry Division.

A handful of soldiers, mostly United States Army Air Service aviators, earned three or more Distinguished Service Crosses. Captain Eddie Rickenbacker, the top U.S. ace of the war, was awarded a record eight Distinguished Service Crosses, one of which was later upgraded to the Medal of Honor, while flying with the 94th Aero Squadron. Fellow aviators Captain Douglas Campbell, also of the 94th, and First Lieutenant Frank O'Driscoll "Monk" Hunter of the 103rd Aero Squadron each received five. Another 94th aviator, Major Reed McKinley Chambers, was awarded four Distinguished Service Crosses. Three aviators received three Distinguished Service Crosses – First Lieutenant Murray K. Guthrie of the 13th Aero Squadron, First Lieutenant Ralph A. O'Neill of the 147th Aero Squadron, and Glen A. Preston, an aerial observation pilot with the 99th Aero Squadron. Among other prominent aviators were Brigadier General Billy Mitchell, the Chief of Air Service of the American Expeditionary Force; Second Lieutenant Frank Luke of the 27th Aero Squadron, who was honored with the Medal of Honor and two Distinguished Service Crosses; and Sumner Sewall of the 95th Aero Squadron, recipient of two Distinguished Service Crosses, who served as Governor of Maine from 1941 to 1945. Edward Peck Curtis, also of the 95th Aero Squadron received the Distinguished Service Cross as a first lieutenant.

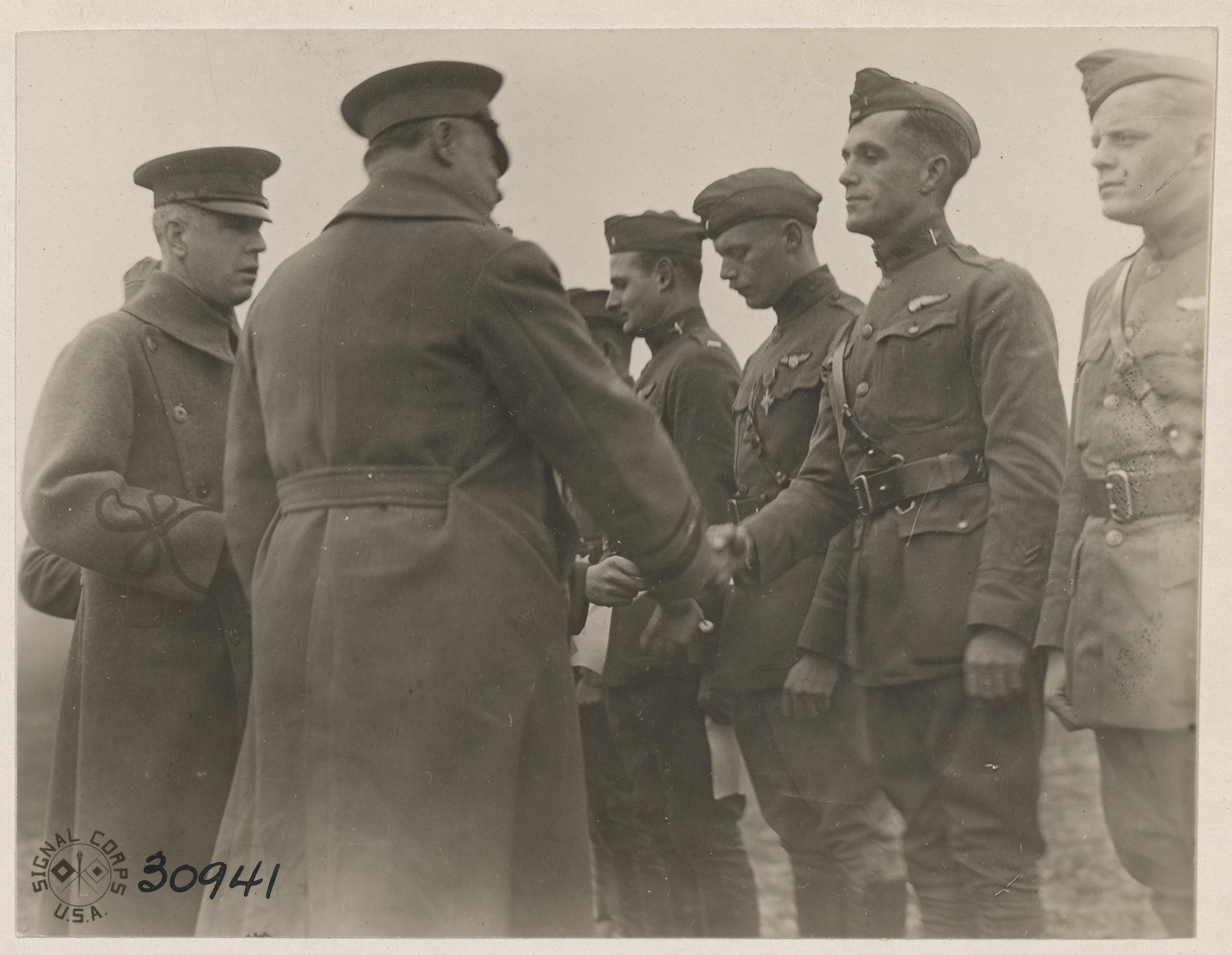
Lieutenant General Hunter Liggett awarding the Distinguished Service Cross to First Lieutenant Hugh Brewster of the 94th Aerial P. S. Squadron, Remicourt, Marne, France, December 18, 1918

Colonel John H. Parker, the commander of the 102nd Infantry Regiment, 26th Division, was the only ground soldier in World War I to receive four Distinguished Service Crosses. First Lieutenant Oscar B. Nelson of the 168th Infantry Regiment, 42nd Division, was honored three times, the third award being posthumous.

Several men who had previously received the Medal of Honor received the Distinguished Service Cross in World War I. Most notable of these was Marine Corps legend, Sergeant Major Daniel Daly, who was twice decorated with the Medal of Honor, and who received the Distinguished Service Cross for heroism as First Sergeant of the 73rd Company, Sixth Marine Regiment, during the Battle of Belleau Wood in June 1918. Colonel Charles E. Kilbourne, who received the Medal of Honor in the Philippine Insurrection, was decorated with the Distinguished Service Cross as chief of staff of the 89th Division. First Lieutenant James B. McConnell, also decorated with the Medal of Honor for actions in the Philippines as a private with the 33rd Infantry, received the Distinguished Service Cross posthumously as a first lieutenant with the 4th Infantry Regiment, 3rd Division.

Marine Corps Colonel Hiram I. Bearss, recipient of the Medal of Honor in the Philippines, was awarded the Distinguished Service Cross while attached to the 102nd Infantry Regiment, 26th Division. Marine Gunner Henry L. Hulbert, also a recipient of the Navy Medal of Honor in the Philippines, received the Distinguished Service Cross for bravery while serving with the 5th Marine Regiment during the Battle of Belleau Wood. Spanish–American War Medal of Honor recipient John H. Quick also received the Distinguished Service Cross at Belleau Wood as Sergeant Major of the Sixth Marine Regiment.

Besides Rickenbacker, several men received both the Medal of Honor and the Distinguished Service Cross during World War I. Navy recipients were John Henry Balch, a U.S. Navy Pharmacist's Mate, and Joel T. Boone, a U.S. Navy Lieutenant (Medical Corps), both attached to the Sixth Marine Regiment. Army recipients were Private Daniel R. Edwards of the 3rd Machine-Gun Battalion, 1st Division, Colonel William J. "Wild Bill" Donovan of the 165th Infantry Regiment, 42nd Division, and Second Lieutenant Samuel I. Parker of the 28th Infantry Regiment, 1st Division.

Two recipients of the Distinguished Service Cross during World War I went on to earn the Medal of Honor in World War II – Major (later Brigadier General) Theodore Roosevelt Jr. of the 26th Infantry Regiment, 1st Division, son of the former president, and Brigadier General (later General of the Army) Douglas MacArthur of the 42nd Division. Other recipients of the Distinguished Service Cross in World War I who went on to acclaim in World War II include George S. Patton Jr. and Carl Spaatz.

Among other prominent recipients of the Distinguished Service Cross during World War I were Brigadier General John L. Hines, decorated as commanding general of the 1st Brigade, 1st Division, and Major General Charles Pelot Summerall, decorated as commanding general of the 1st Division, who both went on to serve as Chief of Staff of the United States Army. Private Sam Ervin of the 28th Infantry Regiment, 1st Division, went on to serve as a United States Senator from the state of North Carolina. Major Dwight F. Davis, decorated as Assistant Chief of Staff of the 69th Infantry Brigade, 35th Division, founded the Davis Cup international tennis competition and served as United States Secretary of War in the Coolidge Administration. Father John B. DeValles, chaplain (first lieutenant), known as the Angel of the Trenches for administering to the needs of both Allied and German soldiers. He founded the first Portuguese parochial school at the Espirito Santo Church in Fall River, Massachusetts. B. Caroll Reece, decorated as a First Lieutenant with the 102nd Infantry Regiment, 26th Division, went on to represent the state of Tennessee in the United States House of Representatives for a total of 17 terms. Twenty one African American soldiers from the 370th Infantry Regiment received the Distinguished Service Cross (DSC) for action in both the Meuse–Argonne and Oise–Aisne campaigns.

=== Between the World Wars ===
In the immediate aftermath of World War I, 62 awards were made for actions in North Russia and Siberia during the Russian Civil War. Also, approximately 132 retroactive awards were made for actions in previous conflicts, including the Indian Wars, the Spanish–American War, the Philippine Insurrection, the Boxer Rebellion, and the Mexican border conflicts. Fifteen soldiers previously awarded Certificates of Merit for non-combat gallantry between 1899 and 1917 were awarded the Distinguished Service Cross.

Prominent among post-World War I Distinguished Service Cross recipients for acts before that war was General J. Franklin Bell, Chief of Staff of the Army from 1906 to 1910. A recipient of the Medal of Honor during the Philippine Insurrection, in 1925 he was awarded a Distinguished Service Cross for bravery in the Spanish–American War in 1898. In 1920, General Peyton C. March, then serving as Chief of Staff of the Army, was awarded a Distinguished Service Cross for bravery in the Philippines during the Spanish–American War when he was a 1st lieutenant. March's successor, General of the Armies John J. Pershing, received a Distinguished Service Cross in 1941 for bravery during the Philippine Insurrection. Second Lieutenant Gordon Johnston and Corporal Arthur M. Ferguson, both Medal of Honor recipients for the Philippine Insurrection, were also awarded the Distinguished Service Cross for other acts of bravery in the Philippines. Future Governor of American Samoa Otto Dowling received the cross for displaying bravery while responding to a fire at Lake Denmark Powder Depot, which he commanded at the time.

Among the recipients of the Distinguished Service Cross for Siberia and North Russia were Robert L. Eichelberger, who would earn a second medal in World War II, and Sidney C. Graves, who had previously received a Distinguished Service Cross in World War I.

=== World War II ===
During World War II, just over 5,000 awards were made. Army Air Forces Lieutenant Colonel John C. Meyer, Major General James A. Van Fleet, and Master Sergeant Llewellyn Chilson were three-time recipients. Jeannette Guyot and Virginia Hall were the only two women to receive the award.

A number of recipients of the Distinguished Service Cross in earlier conflicts were again honored in World War II. Chester Hirschfelder, who as a captain with the 5th Machine Gun Battalion, 2nd Infantry Division, had received his first Distinguished Service Cross in 1918, received two more in 1944 as a colonel commanding the 9th Infantry Regiment of that same division. Three recipients of two Distinguished Service Crosses in World War I – Douglas MacArthur, Hanford MacNider and Harry H. Semmes – received their third in World War II. A handful of men who had received the Distinguished Service Cross in World War I received a second in World War II. Among these were George S. Patton Jr., whose second Distinguished Service Cross came as commanding general of the Seventh Army in Sicily, and Fred L. Walker, commander of the U.S. 36th Infantry Division in the breakout from Anzio and advance on Rome. Lieutenant General Robert L. Eichelberger, whose first Distinguished Service Cross was awarded for valor in Siberia in 1919, received a second for valor in New Guinea in the Buna campaign of 1942–43.

A little over fifty soldiers (and one sailor) received two Distinguished Service Crosses in World War II. The sailor was John D. Bulkeley, who also received the Medal of Honor and the Navy Cross and was one of the most highly decorated Americans of World War II. Among Army recipients of two Distinguished Service Crosses were Creighton W. Abrams Jr., later the Chief of Staff of the Army, William O. Darby, one of the fathers of the U.S. Army Rangers, and Robert T. Frederick, commander of the U.S-Canadian 1st Special Service Force. Six men of the 82nd Airborne Division received two Distinguished Service Crosses: Charles Billingslea, James M. Gavin, Arthur F. Gorham, Matthew B. Ridgway, Reuben Henry Tucker III and Benjamin H. Vandervoort. Several fighter pilots also received two Distinguished Service Crosses, including Donald Blakeslee, Paul P. Douglas Jr., William E. Dyess, Dominic "Don" Gentile, Gerald R. Johnson, Charles "Mac" MacDonald, James B. Morehead, Jay T. "Cock" Robbins, David C. Schilling, Jesús A. Villamor, William T. Whisner Jr. and Ray S. Wetmore. Bomber pilot Richard H. Carmichael also received two Distinguished Service Crosses.

The commander of Easy Company of the 506th Parachute Infantry Regiment, U.S. 101st Airborne Division, Richard Winters, received a Distinguished Service Cross for his role in the assault on Brecourt Manor on D-Day; a member of the 502nd Parachute Infantry Regiment, U.S. 101st Airborne Division, Harrison C. Summers received a Distinguished Service Cross for his role on the assault to capture a building complex nearby designated "WXYZ" on the field order map.

During World War II, twelve soldiers, three airmen, and two sailors received both the Medal of Honor and the Distinguished Service Cross: from the Army, Bernard P. Bell, Maurice L. "Footsie" Britt, Herbert H. Burr, Leonard A. Funk, Gerry H. Kisters, James M. Logan, George L. Mabry Jr., Douglas MacArthur, Audie L. Murphy, Junior J. Spurrier, Jack L. Treadwell and Jonathan M. Wainwright; from the Army Air Forces, Richard I. Bong, Horace S. Carswell Jr. and Thomas B. McGuire Jr.; and from the Navy, John D. Bulkeley and Samuel D. Dealey (who also received four Navy Crosses). One World War II Distinguished Service Cross recipient, Raymond Harvey, would earn the Medal of Honor in the Korean War.

General Paul W. Tibbets, commander of the 509th Composite Group (509 CG), was awarded the Distinguished Service Cross by General Spaatz for piloting the Enola Gay, the B-29 Superfortress plane which dropped the first nuclear bomb on Hiroshima.

=== Korean War ===
In the Korean War, there were just over 800 awards, of which over 300 were posthumous.

Robert R. Martin, colonel with the 24th Infantry Division was a first recipient in the Korean war.

Lloyd L. "Scooter" Burke, a lieutenant with the 1st Cavalry Division, Benjamin F. Wilson, a master sergeant with the 7th Infantry Division, Lewis Millett, a captain with the 27th Infantry Regiment and Air Force fighter ace George A. Davis Jr., each earned both the Medal of Honor and the Distinguished Service Cross in Korea.

Colonel Arthur Champeny, previously decorated for bravery at Saint-Mihiel in September 1918 and a second time at Santa Maria Infante, Italy in May 1944, received a third Distinguished Service Cross in September 1950. Fighter pilot William T. Whisner, recipient of two Distinguished Service Crosses in World War II, was awarded a third in Korea.

Ten World War II recipients received a second Distinguished Service Cross in Korea. Among these were John T. Corley, whose first Distinguished Service Cross was earned in North Africa in March 1943 with the 1st Infantry Division and whose second was earned in August 1950 with the 25th Infantry Division, Hobart R. Gay, whose first Distinguished Service Cross was earned in 1944 as Chief of Staff of George S. Patton's Third Army and whose second was earned in 1950 as commanding general of the 1st Cavalry Division, and Walton Walker, whose first Distinguished Service Cross was earned in 1944 as commanding general of XX Corps and whose second was earned in 1950 as commanding general of Eighth Army. Nine men received two Distinguished Service Crosses in Korea. Among these was Edward Almond, the commanding general of X Corps. Lieutenant Colonel Frank Walter Lukas, received two Distinguished Service Crosses in Korea, plus his third silver star and third purple heart.

Korean War Distinguished Service Cross recipient First Lieutenant Richard E. Cavazos would earn a second Distinguished Service Cross in Vietnam and rise to full general, becoming the first Hispanic-American four-star general. Korean War Distinguished Service Cross recipient Ralph Puckett Jr. would also receive a second Distinguished Service Cross in Vietnam in command of a battalion of the 101st Airborne Division. Thomas Tackaberry would earn a Distinguished Service Cross in 1952 as a company commander and two more in Vietnam. U.S. Air Force ace Ralph Parr earned a Distinguished Service Cross in 1953 in Korea and an Air Force Cross in Vietnam.

Three marines earned both the Navy Cross and the Army Distinguished Service Cross in Korea: Homer Litzenberg, Raymond Murray, and Marine Corps legend Lewis B. "Chesty" Puller. "Chesty" Puller had previously earned four Navy Crosses in Nicaragua and World War II, while Murray was awarded the Army Distinguished Service Cross for extraordinary heroism in the 1st Marine Division's historic breakout from the Chosin Reservoir area to the sea at Hamhung, and two days later took part in the action which earned him his second Navy Cross. Murray had earned his first Navy Cross on Saipan during World War II.

Other notable Korean War recipients of the Distinguished Service Cross include Harold K. Johnson, later Chief of Staff of the Army, and Herbert B. Powell, later Ambassador to New Zealand (1963–67). Along with Gen. Johnson, at least five other Korean War Distinguished Service Cross recipients later rose to four-star rank: Paul L. Freeman Jr., Clark L. Ruffner (decorated in 1951 as commander of the 2nd Infantry Division), John L. Throckmorton and John H. "Iron Mike" Michaelis (who had commanded the 502nd Parachute Infantry Regiment in Normandy). Welborn G. Dolvin, decorated as a lieutenant colonel with the 25th Infantry Division, rose to lieutenant general. MG Ned D. Moore, who earned a Distinguished Service Cross as a colonel in August 1950, had previously served as Chief of Staff of the 101st Airborne Division in the Battle of the Bulge and later rose to major general. Olinto M. Barsanti went on to command the 101st Airborne in Vietnam. Guy S. Meloy went on to command the 82nd Airborne. 1st Lt. Joseph G. Clemons for his actions during the Pork Chop Hill, he would later command the 198th Infantry Brigade in the Vietnam War and Master Sergeant Juan E. Negrón on 1951, from 65th Infantry Regiment (United States), upgraded to Medal of Honor on 2014 by President Barack Obama

Among the 14 foreign recipients of the Distinguished Service Cross in the Korean War was Sinasi Sukan (Şinasi Sükan), a captain with 3rd Brigade Turkish Army who has lost his leg during Vegas War, Kenneth Muir, a major with the 1st Battalion, Argyll and Sutherland Highlanders, British Army, who also posthumously received the Victoria Cross. Other foreign recipients came from the Belgian, British, French, Greek, Philippine, South Korean and Turkish armies. Soldiers serving with the Greek Expeditionary Force received 6 Distinguished Service Crosses in total during the Korean War.

=== Vietnam War ===
There were just over 1,000 awards in the Vietnam War, almost 400 of which were posthumous.

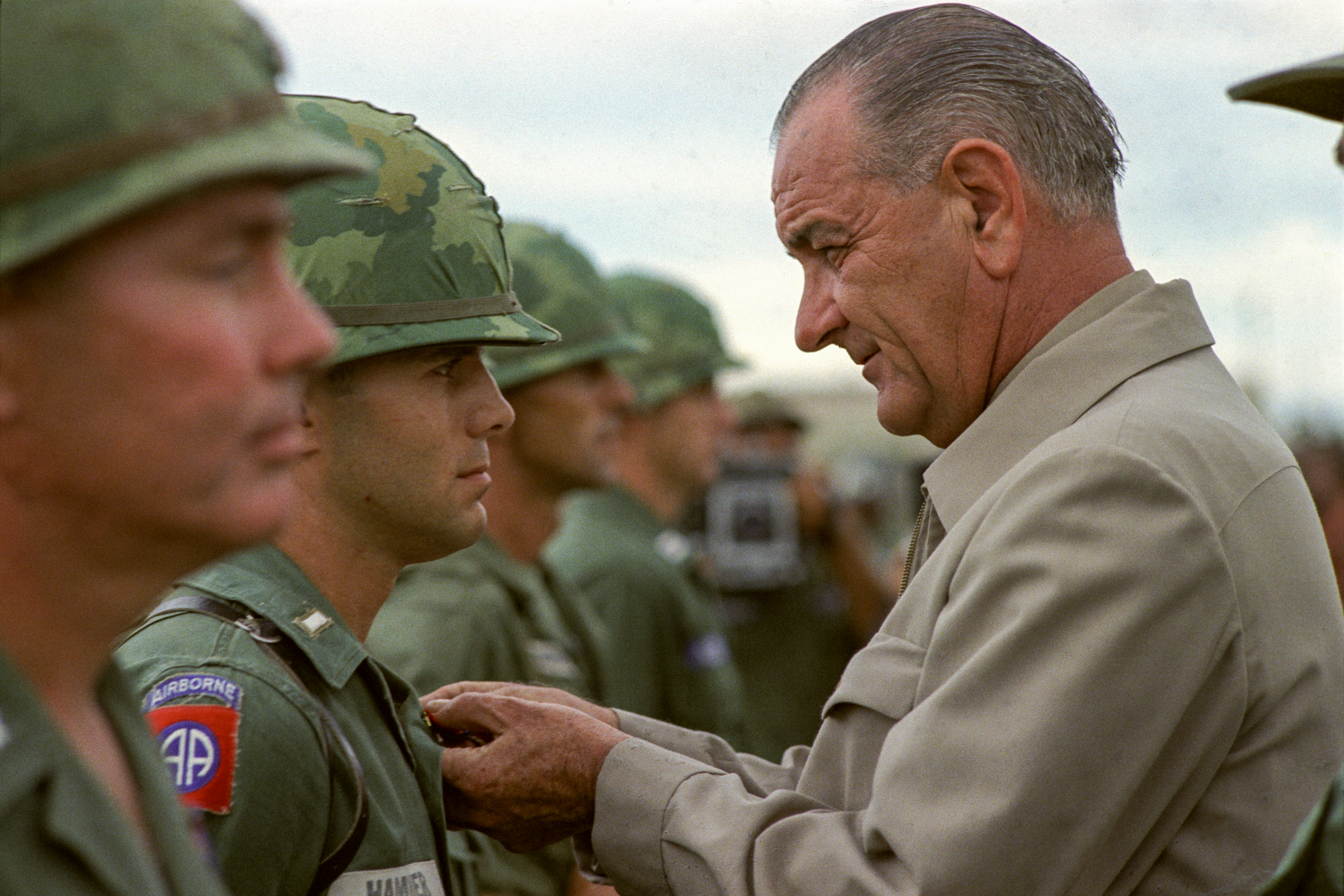
President Lyndon B. Johnson awards the Distinguished Service Cross to First Lieutenant Marty A. Hammer

Patrick Brady, a helicopter pilot with the 44th Medical Brigade, and Robert L. Howard, a Special Forces NCO, received both the Medal of Honor and the Distinguished Service Cross in Vietnam. Major General Keith L. Ware, who had earned the Medal of Honor in World War II and who was killed in action in September 1968, received a posthumous Distinguished Service Cross.

James F. Hollingsworth, who received a Distinguished Service Cross in April 1945 as commander of 2nd Battalion, 67th Armored Regiment, received a second award in November 1966 as assistant division commander of the 1st Infantry Division, and a third in March 1967 as acting division commander of the 1st Infantry Division. He was the subject of the narrative "The General Goes Zapping Charlie Cong". Thomas H. Tackaberry, who received his first Distinguished Service Cross in Korea, received a second in September 1966 as a battalion commander with the 1st Cavalry Division and a third in September 1969 as commander of the 196th Infantry Brigade, Americal Division. Both later rose to lieutenant general.

One World War II recipient, William E. DePuy, and two Korean War recipients, Richard E. Cavazos and Ralph Puckett Jr., received a second Distinguished Service Cross in Vietnam. Both DePuy and Cavazos would later rise to full general.

Besides Hollingsworth and Tackaberry, eleven other soldiers earned two Distinguished Service Crosses in Vietnam. Two, John R. Deane Jr. and Barry R. McCaffrey, later rose to full general, and a third, Henry E. Emerson, retired as a lieutenant general. McCaffrey also served as Director of the Office of National Drug Control Policy during the Clinton Administration. Colonel David H. Hackworth, who also received ten Silver Stars in Korea and Vietnam, later rose to prominence as a military affairs journalist. George S. Patton IV, son of a two-time Distinguished Service Cross recipient, received two Distinguished Service Crosses in 1968 as commander of the 11th Armored Cavalry Regiment. Sergeant Adelbert Waldron III, twice awarded the Distinguished Service Cross in 1969 as a sniper with the 9th Infantry Division, is credited with 109 confirmed kills, the most among U.S. snipers. Dennis Tomcik, a first lieutenant with the 47th Infantry Regiment, was twice awarded the Distinguished Service Cross for two separate actions in 1968 in the Kien Hoa Province.

Among other notable Vietnam War Distinguished Service Cross recipients were several who later rose to full general. Among these, besides DePuy and Cavazos, were Paul F. Gorman, who later commanded the U.S. Southern Command; Robert C. Kingston, the first commander-in-chief of U.S. Central Command; James J. Lindsay, who later commanded the U.S. Special Operations Command; Timothy J. Grogan, who later served as the deputy chief of staff for doctrine at the Army's Training and Doctrine Command at Fort Monroe; and Louis C. Menetrey, who wore three hats as Commander, United Nations Command, R.O.K./U.S. Combined Forces Command and U.S. Forces Korea. John W. Vessey Jr., decorated for valor during Operation Junction City in March 1967, rose to become Chairman of the Joint Chiefs of Staff, retiring in 1985. Frederick C. Weyand was decorated in 1967 as commanding general of the 25th Infantry Division. He would serve as Chief of Staff of the Army from 1974 to 1976. Bernard W. Rogers, decorated in March 1967 as assistant division commander of the 1st Infantry Division, succeeded General Weyand as Chief of Staff of the Army and subsequently became NATO's Supreme Allied Commander, Europe (SACEUR). Alexander M. Haig Jr., also decorated in March 1967 as a battalion commander in the 1st Infantry Division, preceded General Rogers as SACEUR, and became Secretary of State in the Reagan Administration. Former West Point football All-American, then Captain Bill Carpenter, "The Lonesome End", received the award in 1966, and would go on to retire as a major general.

First Lieutenant Norman A. Mordue received the Distinguished Service Cross for valor in May 1967 while serving with the 1st Cavalry Division. He was appointed to the U.S. federal bench in 1998 and in 2006 became the Chief Judge of the U.S. District Court for the Northern District of New York. Eldon Bargewell, decorated in 1971 as a staff sergeant with MACV-SOG, was later commissioned and as of early 2006 was a major general on the staff of Multi-National Force Iraq and the only Vietnam-era DSC recipient still on active duty. David Christian, described as the "Youngest Most Decorated Officer of the Vietnam War", received the Distinguished Service Cross recipient while leading a long range reconnaissance patrol of the 1st Infantry Division, and later became a prominent advocate for veterans.

Among Distinguished Service Cross recipients for valor in the early battles in Vietnam were four members of the 1st Cavalry Division decorated for valor in the Battle of Ia Drang Valley in November 1965 – Lt. Col. Hal Moore who later became a Lieutenant General, Major Bruce Crandall, and two other members of their unit. The actions of all four were later portrayed in the 2002 film We Were Soldiers, based on Hal Moore's book on the battle. Crandall's Distinguished Service Cross was later upgraded to the Medal of Honor, which was presented to him in February 2007.

Six Distinguished Service Crosses were awarded to Son Tay raiders, participants in the November 1970 attempt to rescue U.S. POWs in North Vietnam. Among the recipients were Special Forces soldiers Richard J. "Dick" Meadows and Arthur D. "Bull" Simons.

=== 1975 to present ===
After the Vietnam War, the Distinguished Service Cross has been awarded multiple times. As of December 2018, it has been awarded 16 times for actions during Operation Enduring Freedom – Afghanistan. As of March 2013, the Distinguished Service Cross has been awarded 13 times for actions during Operation Iraqi Freedom. Master Sergeant David R. Halbruner was awarded the medal for his actions during the 2012 Benghazi attack; U.S. Army Sergeant First Class Kyle Morgan was also awarded for actions during the 2015 Bamako hotel attack.

==== Operation Enduring Freedom ====
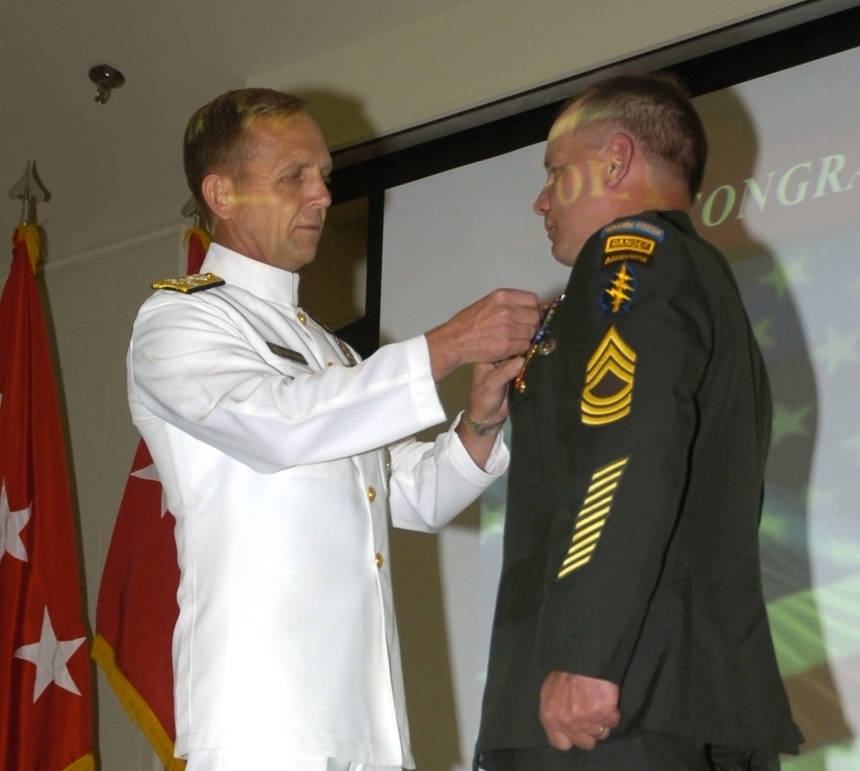
MSG Brendan O'Connor receiving the Distinguished Service Cross

Major Mark E. Mitchell, 3rd Battalion, 5th Special Forces Group, was awarded the Distinguished Service Cross for his leading his team against a numerically superior enemy force to free an American held captive at Qala-i-Jang Fortress, Mazar-e Sharif, Afghanistan between 25 and 28 November 2001. MSgt Brendan W. O'Connor, 2nd Battalion, 7th Special Forces Group, was awarded the Distinguished Service Cross after he removed his body armor to reach to a pair of wounded teammates and render medical aid to them, while under fire, on 24 June 2006.

==== Operation Iraqi Freedom ====
Colonel James H. Coffman Jr., 1st Iraqi Special Police Commando Brigade, was awarded the Distinguished Service Cross for defending a police station in Mosul from an insurgent attack on 14 November 2004.

== Notable recipients ==
Note that the inclusion of one, or more, Oak Leaf Clusters signifies each additional Distinguished Service Cross awarded to that recipient.

Name	Service	Rank	Repeat DSC	Notes
Creighton W. Abrams Jr.	US Army	GEN	with one Oak Leaf Cluster	Army Chief of Staff
Edward Almond	US Army	LTG	with one Oak Leaf Cluster	Division and Corps commander in World War II and Korea.
Vernon Baker	US Army	1LT		later upgraded to the Medal of Honor
Robert H. Barrow	US Marine Corps	General		Commandant of the US Marine Corps.
Robert S. Beightler	US Army	MG		Commanding General of Ohio Army National Guard's 37th Infantry Division
Thomas Blamey	Australian Army	General		later Australia's first Field Marshal
Larry "Scrappy" Blumer	US Army Air Forces	MAJ		
Richard Bong	US Army Air Forces	MAJ		Medal of Honor recipient with 40 confirmed aerial victories.
Herman Bottcher	US Army	CPT		veteran of the Abraham Lincoln Battalion
Lewis H. Brereton	US Army Air Service	LTG	with one Oak Leaf Cluster	
Maurice Britt	US Army	CPT		also a Medal of Honor and Silver Star recipient, first recipient of top four valor decorations in WWII
John D. Bulkeley	US Navy	VADM		also Medal of Honor and Navy Cross recipient
Joseph Burlazzi	US Army			
John Francis Burnes	US Marine Corps	CPT		Marine officer in World War I.
Douglas Campbell	US Army Air Service		with four Oak Leaf Clusters	
Bill Carpenter	US Army			
Modesto Cartagena	US Army			most decorated Hispanic soldier of the Korean War
Richard Cavazos	US Army	GEN	with one Oak Leaf Cluster	first Hispanic full general
Arthur S. Champeny	US Army		with two Oak leaf Clusters	only person to receive the DSC in three different conflicts: WWI, WWII and Korean War
Llewellyn Chilson	US Army		with two Oak Leaf Clusters	
Vasily Chuikov	Red Army	Army General (General Armii)		hero of WWII Battle of Stalingrad
Mark W. Clark	US Army	GEN		Commander of 5th Army Group
William J. Cullerton	US Army Air Forces			WWII flying ace
Alan "Ace" Cozzalio	US Army			helicopter pilot
William Orlando Darby	US Army		with one Oak Leaf Cluster	
Daniel Daly	US Marine Corps			also Medal of Honor recipient
Dwight F. Davis	US Army			Secretary of War
Samuel David Dealey	US Navy	Commander		Medal of Honor and four-time Navy Cross recipient.
Ray C. Dickop	US Army	1LT		General John Pershing, Commander of the American Expeditionary Forces, compiled a list of 100 greatest American heroes of World War I which included 1LT Ray Dickop.
William J. "Wild Bill" Donovan	US Army	MG		Director of the Office of Strategic Services (OSS) and first recipient of top three decorations in single war.
Otto Dowling	US Navy	Captain		Led response to the Lake Denmark explosion.
Jesus S. Duran	US Army			Later upgraded to the Medal of Honor.
Robert L. Eichelberger	US Army	GEN	with one Oak Leaf Cluster	Commanded I Corps and the Eighth Army in the Southwest Pacific Area during World War II.
Henry E. Emerson	US Army	LTG		
Robert M. Emery	US Army	1LT		
Sam Ervin	US Army	PVT		United States Senator and chairman of the Watergate hearings.
Manuel J. Fernandez	US Air Force			Flying ace.
Geoffrey Cheney Ferris	US Army	2LT		
Wendell Fertig	US Army	COL		WWII Guerilla Leader 10th Military District, Philippine Islands.
Aaron R. Fisher	US Army			366th Infantry Regiment officer
Edward Fuller	US Marine Corps	Capt		
James M. Gavin	US Army	LTG	with one Oak Leaf Cluster	
Hobart R. Gay	US Army		with one Oak Leaf Cluster	
Andrew Goodpaster	US Army	GEN		NATO Supreme Allied Commander Europe.
John Campbell Greenway	US Army	BG		Rough Rider in Spanish-American War.
Henry Gunther	US Army	SGT		Last casualty of World War I.
Jeannette Guyot	French Resistance			
David H. Hackworth	US Army	COL	with one Oak Leaf Cluster	Controversial author. Ten Silver Stars, eight Bronze Stars and eight Purple Hearts.
Alexander Haig	US Army	GEN		US Secretary of State.
Virginia Hall	OSS	civilian		
Frank Kerr Hays	Army Air Service			WWI ace
John L. Hines	US Army	GEN		Army Chief of Staff
Courtney Hodges	US Army	GEN		Commanded First Army in World War II.
Robert L. Howard	US Army	COL		Medal of Honor and Silver Star recipient, all in the same 1967–68 tour.
Clarence R. Huebner	US Army	LTG	one Oak Leaf Cluster	Commanded the 1st Infantry Division and V Corps during World War II.
LeRoy P. Hunt	US Marine Corps	Col		
Frank O'Driscoll "Monk" Hunter	US Army Air Service	MG	four Oak Leaf Clusters	World War I flying ace.
Isadore Jachman	US Army	Staff Sergeant		later upgraded to Medal of Honor
Henry Johnson	US Army	SGT		later upgraded to Medal of Honor, African American soldier in WWI
Rene Joyeuse	Free French Forces and OSS	Captain		
Roy Judkins	US Army	Specialist sixth class		For action in Vietnam War as explosives disposal specialist
Ivan Kamera	Red Army	Colonel General (General-Polkovnik)		WWII artillery general
Charles L. Kelly	US Army			Dust Off pilot, Vietnam, posthumous
George C. Kenney	US Army Air Service, US Army Air Forces	GEN	with one Oak Leaf Cluster	
Young-Oak Kim	US Army	COL		For action in WW2, later became first Asian-American to command a combat battalion in the Korean War.
Robert C. Kingston	US Army	GEN		Combat Veteran of Korea and Vietnam
Salvador J. Lara	US Army			later upgraded to the Medal of Honor
Curtis LeMay	US Army Air Forces	GEN		Air Force Chief of Staff.
Douglas MacArthur	US Army	GA	with two Oak Leaf Clusters	also received Medal of Honor, 7 Silver Stars, and 3 French Croix de Guerre.
Gordon H. Mansfield	US Army	CPT		Deputy Secretary of Department of Veterans Affairs
Peyton C. March	US Army	GEN		Army Chief of Staff
Anthony McAuliffe	US Army	GEN		Led defense of Bastogne.
Barry McCaffrey	US Army	GEN	with one Oak Leaf Cluster	
John McNulty	US Marine Corps			Navy Cross recipient.
James Megellas	US Army	LTC		Also received 2 Silver Star, 2 Bronze Star with "V" and 2 Purple Heart, considered one of the most decorated combat officers in the history of the 82nd Airborne Division
Louis Gonzaga Mendez Jr.	US Army	COL		Battalion commander, 82nd Airborne Division.
Billy Mitchell	US Army Air Service	BG		
Kyle A. Morgan	US Army			
Dudley W. Morton	US Navy	CAPT		Distinguished submarine captain, also a four-time Navy Cross recipient
Henry Mucci	US Army			
Kenneth Muir	British Army	Major		Also British Victoria Cross recipient
Audie Murphy	US Army	MAJ		Medal of Honor recipient.
Michael Ollis	US Army	SSG		Later upgraded to Medal of Honor
John "Gatling Gun" Parker	US Army	BG	with three Oak Leaf Clusters	
George S. Patton	US Army	GEN	with one Oak Leaf Cluster	Legendary general
George Patton IV	US Army	MG	with one Oak Leaf Cluster	
Keith Payne	Australian Army	WO2		also Commonwealth Victoria Cross recipient
Thomas Payne	US Army	SGM		later upgraded to the Medal of Honor
John J. Pershing	US Army	GAS		Commander of the American Expeditionary Force and Army Chief of Staff
Pascal Poolaw	US Army	First Sergeant		The United States' most decorated Native American. Four Silver Stars and three Purple Hearts.
Chesty Puller	US Marine Corps	LtGen		Five-time Navy Cross recipient.
Howard Knox Ramey	US Army			
William John Read	Royal Australian Navy	Lt		WWII Coastwatcher
Eddie Rickenbacker	US Army Air Service	CPT	with six Oak Leaf Clusters	a seventh Oak Leaf was later upgraded to the Medal of Honor
Matthew B. Ridgway	US Army	GEN	with one Oak Leaf Cluster	Army Chief of Staff and NATO Supreme Allied Commander
Keller E. Rockey	US Marine Corps	LtGen		
Bernard W. Rogers	US Army	GEN		US Army Chief of Staff and NATO Supreme Allied Commander.
Theodore Roosevelt Jr.	US Army	BG		Also Medal of Honor recipient.
Maurice Rose	US Army	MAJ		
Robert Rosenthal	US Army Air Forces	LTC		also recipient of 16 other valor and service awards, WWII B-17 pilot
Alfredo Santos	Philippine Army	Major		also received the Silver Star, both for his actions during the WWII Battle of Bataan
Lemuel C. Shepherd Jr.	US Marine Corps	Gen		Commandant of US Marine Corps.
Oliver Prince Smith	US Marine Corps	Gen		
Isabel Stambaugh	US Army Nurse Corps			hit by shelling in WWI field hospital, continued her duties
Joseph Stilwell	US Army	GEN		Commander of the China Burma India Theater.
Philip Streczyk	US Army	Technical Sergeant		E Co, 16th Infantry Regiment for combat actions on Easy Red sector of Omaha Beach on D-Day, June 6, 1944
Andrew Summers Rowan	US Army			
Maxwell D. Taylor	US Army	GEN		Army Chief of Staff.
Gerald C. Thomas	US Marine Corps	Gen		Assistant Commandant of the Marine Corps.
James A. Van Fleet	US Army	GEN	with two Oak Leaf Clusters	Commanded Eighth Army in Korea.
John Paul Vann	US State Department	Civilian		Former US Army Lieutenant Colonel.
Jesús Villamor	Philippine Army Air Corps	Captain	with one Oak Leaf Cluster	
Walton Walker	US Army	GEN	with one Oak Leaf Cluster	Died in Korea.
Robert B. Williams	US Army Air Forces			
Richard Winters	US Army	MAJ		"Band of Brothers"
George Frederick Wootten	Australian Army	MAJGEN		
Jarion Halbisengibbs	US Army	SSGT		Awarded during his valor during the Global War on Terror
Alvin York	US Army	MAJ		Later upgraded to the Medal of Honor
Edward F. Younger	US Army			chosen to select the Unknown Soldier for the US after WWI

== Revocation ==
In a number of cases, an award of the Distinguished Service Cross has later been revoked. In most cases, this has been for one of three reasons: the award was upgraded to the Medal of Honor, duplicate awards had been made to the same recipient for the same action by two different headquarters, or the award had been revoked to allow republication with a new and revised award citation. Such revocations have occurred over the history of the decoration.

One of the earliest such cases involves one of the most famous American soldiers of World War I, Alvin York, who initially received a Distinguished Service Cross which was upgraded to the Medal of Honor. And as noted above under "Notable Recipients", top American World War I ace pilot Eddie Rickenbacker originally received eight DSCs, but one was upgraded in 1930 to the Medal of Honor. In 1980, MSG Roy P. Benavidez, a U.S. Army Special Forces veteran, had his Vietnam-era DSC upgraded to the Medal of Honor, which was presented to him by President Reagan at a Pentagon ceremony on February 24, 1981.

A number of DSC revocations and upgrades to the Medal of Honor were the result of reviews initiated by the Army or mandated by the United States Congress. In the early 1990s the Army began a review of discrimination against black soldiers in World War II, none of whom had received the Medal of Honor but several of whom had received lesser awards. Later, the Department of Defense Authorization Act for Fiscal Year 1996 provided for a "Review Regarding Upgrading of Distinguished-Service Crosses and Navy Crosses Awarded to Asian-Americans and Native American Pacific Islanders for World War II Service" and the National Defense Authorization Act for 2002 provided for a "Review Regarding Award of Medal of Honor to Certain Jewish American and Hispanic American War Veterans". There is currently a petition circulating to upgrade the Distinguished Service Cross of Major Richard Winters to a Medal of Honor.

In January 1997, as a result of its review, the Army revoked six awards of the Distinguished Service Cross to black soldiers and upgraded them to the Medal of Honor. These were to Vernon Baker, Edward A. Carter Jr., John R. Fox, Willy F. James Jr., Charles L. Thomas and George Watson. In 2001, the Army officially revoked 21 awards of the Distinguished Service Cross and one of the Silver Star to Asian-American soldiers, mostly Japanese-American, whose awards were upgraded to the Medal of Honor. Among those whose DSC was upgraded was U.S. Senator Daniel Inouye. Others include Francis B. Wai and Rudolph B. Davila.

Jon E. Swanson, posthumously awarded a DSC in 1972, had this revoked in November 2005 (Department of the Army General Order No. 9 of 2005), after his DSC was upgraded to the Medal of Honor in December 2002 (Department of the Army General Order No. 14 of 2002). Another Vietnam War helicopter pilot, Bruce P. Crandall, was awarded the DSC in June 2001 (General Order No. 25 of 2001). This award was rescinded in November 2005 when a new citation was issued (General Order No. 9 of 2005), but the DSC itself was later upgraded to the Medal of Honor, which was presented in February 2007 (the DSC was revoked in General Order No. 3 of 2007).

== See also ==
- Awards and decorations of the United States Army
- Non-U.S. recipients of U.S. gallantry awards
- Puerto Rican recipients of the Distinguished Service Cross
