= Isabel Stambaugh =

J. Isabel Stambaugh
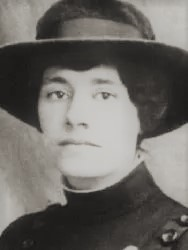
- J. Isabel Stambaugh, c. 1917
- Born: August 15, 1879; Mifflintown, Pennsylvania, United States
- Died: May 11, 1969 (aged 89); Philadelphia, Pennsylvania, United States
- Occupation: Head operating room nurse
- Known for: One of four women awarded the United States Distinguished Service Cross for heroism during World War I
- Medical career
- Institutions: Presbyterian Hospital, Philadelphia

J. Isabel Stambaugh (August 15, 1879 – May 11, 1969) was a United States Army nurse during World War I who served on the front line at a British Causality Clearing Center out of Base Hospital No. 10.

Stambaugh was one of four women who received the United States Distinguished Service Cross for her heroism during World War I.

In February 1935, she was part of a group of wounded veterans who "received the Purple Heart decoration" from the Purple Heart Association (Chapter No. 4) during a celebration of U.S. President George Washington's birthday anniversary in Philadelphia.

== Early life and education ==
J. Isabel Stambaugh was born in Mifflintown, Pennsylvania, on August 15, 1879. Stambaugh graduated from Presbyterian Hospital Nursing School in Philadelphia, Pennsylvania, in 1906.

== Pre-war nursing career ==
Stambaugh was the head operating room nurse for two years at Presbyterian Hospital.

== World War I ==
Stambaugh served on the front line at British Causality Clearing Center out of Base Hospital No. 10. on a surgical team. On March 21, 1918, Stambaugh was seriously injured during an air raid when shells dropped on an operating room during a surgery.

She was cited by Field Marshal Douglas Haig for bravery under fire. Initially treated by military surgeons on site, Stambaugh returned to the United States on April 2, 1919, and received further medical treatment at Fort McHenry. According to The Baltimore Sun, Stambaugh "saw most of her service in the evacuation hospital at Letre Port [correct spelling, Le Tréport], right behind the Somme sector," adding that "her most vivid memories" were "connected with the Amiens 'push' in March, 1918."

"In the Amiens 'push' Miss Stambaugh was at a clearing station near Peronne. The Germans advanced rapidly, forcing the English back, until on the third day of the battle the English began to file past her station. It seemed to her that all parts of the earth were represented in that almost steady stream, and all the while the wounded were being brought in continually. Finally their station was shelled, and the hospital had to be evacuated. As she was going under the ether to be 'operated' she heard the terrible thundering and crashing all around her."

New headquarters were established at Amiens, France and on March 21, 1918, a piece of boche shrapnel struck her. At first she did not realize that she had been wounded, and ran to the help of the men in the room and worked with them until she was too weak to stand.

After recovering from her injury, Stambaugh returned to her unit.

Stambaugh was one of four women who received the United States Distinguished Service Cross for her heroism during World War I. She was awarded the Distinguished Service Cross on June 27, 1919, by the United States Secretary of War Newton Baker.

== Distinguished Service Cross ==
The President of the United States of America, authorized by Act of Congress, July 9, 1918, takes pleasure in presenting the Distinguished Service Cross to Reserve Nurse Isabelle Stambaugh, United States Army, for extraordinary heroism in action while serving with Base Hospital No. 10, Nurse Corps, A.E.F. (Attached), in front of Amiens, France, 21 March 1918, while with a surgical team at a British Casualty Clearing Station during the big German drive of 21 March 1918, in front of Amiens, France. Nurse Stambaugh was seriously wounded by shell fire from German aeroplanes.

== Post-war nursing career ==
Following her World War I and World War II service, Stambaugh returned to her civilian nursing career. Part of a group of wounded veterans who "received the Purple Heart decoration" from the Purple Heart Association (Chapter No. 4) during a celebration of U.S. President George Washington's birthday anniversary in Philadelphia in February 1935, she was also one of two Philadelphia-area nurses to be honored for their war-time heroism by the Army and Navy Legion of Valor in 1954. She was employed by Presbyterian Hospital.

After working as the acting supervisor of nurses for almost two decades, she retired from Presbyterian Hospital circa 1957.

== Later life, death and interment ==
Stambaugh resided at 208 North 34th Street in Philadelphia. She died in Philadelphia on May 11, 1969. Her funeral was held in Mifflintown's funeral home on Third Street on May 15. She was then interred in that community's Presbyterian cemetery.
