= Mary Irma Hilger =

American religious sister

- Born: July 12, 1917; Ost, Reno County, Kansas
- Died: February 22, 2003 (aged 85); Broken Arrow, Tulsa County, Oklahoma
- Other names: Mother Irma
- Occupations: Religious sister, nurse
- Years active: 1955–1997
- Known for: founding the St. Jude Hospital and nurse's training school

Sister Mary Irma Hilger (July 12, 1917 – February 22, 2003) was an American Catholic nun, who trained as a nurse and founded the St. Jude Hospital and nurse's training school on the Caribbean island of St. Lucia. She has been called the "Florence Nightingale of St. Lucia".

== Early life ==
Mary Irma Hilger was born on July 12, 1917, in Ost, Reno County, Kansas to Katherine May and Peter M. Hilger. She joined the Sisters of the Sorrowful Mother in 1935 and went on to obtain a bachelor's degree and master's degree in nursing from Saint Louis University, in St. Louis, Missouri.

== Career ==
In 1955, Hilger became the supervisor of obstetrics at St. Francis Hospital in Wichita, Kansas. In 1961, she was posted to St. Lucia in the West Indies, along with four other sisters. Her master's work had concerned the feasibility of establishing a nursing training program on the island. The nurses began their training program, the first nursing school on the island, at the Victoria Hospital in Castries.

Traversing the island in 1962, Hilger discovered an abandoned military hospital on the former United States Beane Air Force Base facility, near Vieux Fort which had been closed in 1947. She began negotiating with the government to repurpose the buildings. By the beginning of 1964, the Sisters of the Sorrowful Mother received donated land from the Devaux family. The following year, Hilger took businessman Hogarth Belizaire to evaluate the military site and they approached Chief Minister John Compton with their plan. The government agreed to the plan in 1965 and after several months of rehabilitating the property, which had been unused for twenty years, the hospital officially opened on September 5, 1966. Operating as a charity hospital at no charge to patients and a school, the first class of nurses graduated in October 1969. Hilger was the hospital administrator until 1976.

Returning to the United States in November 1976, Hilger became the administrator of the Franciscan Villa in Broken Arrow, Oklahoma between 1979 and 1982. She returned to St. Francis Regional Medical Center of Wichita in 1982, working as a receptionist until her retirement in 1997. She remained committed to St. Jude's, collecting medicines, supplies and monetary donations to assist the care givers in the Caribbean.

== Death and legacy ==
Hilger died on February 22, 2003, in Broken Arrow, Oklahoma. She is remembered as the "Florence Nightingale of St. Lucia", for establishing the hospital, which grew to serve 70,000 residents on the south side of the island. The hospital was destroyed by fire in 2009 and was forced to operate from temporary quarters in a former stadium. At the end of 2023 a project to reconstruct the hospital was approved by the Development Control Authority (DCA) and funding was reported to be confirmed.
