= 9th Reconnaissance Wing =

US Air Force unit assigned to the Air Combat Command

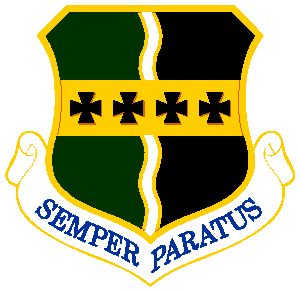
- Wing emblem
- Country: United States
- Branch: United States Air Force
- Type: Operational wing
- Role: Reconnaissance
- Size: c. 3,000 personnel
- Part of: Air Combat Command (Sixteenth Air Force)
- Base: Beale Air Force Base, California
- Motto: Semper paratus (Latin for 'Always ready')
- Decorations: Air Force Outstanding Unit Award with Combat "V" Device; Presidential Unit Citation
- Website: Official website

Commanders
- Current commander: Colonel Charles G. Cameron

Insignia
- Tail code: BB

Aircraft flown
- Reconnaissance: RQ-4 Global Hawk; RQ-180; U-2R Dragon Lady
- Trainer: T-38 Talon

The 9th Reconnaissance Wing is a United States Air Force unit assigned to the Air Combat Command and Sixteenth Air Force. It is stationed at Beale Air Force Base, California. The wing is also the host unit at Beale.

Its mission is to organize, train and equip the Air Force's fleet of U-2R Dragon Lady, RQ-4 Global Hawk aircraft for peacetime intelligence gathering, contingency operations, conventional war fighting and Emergency War Order support. It is also assigned Northrop T-38 Talons for U-2 pilots to maintain flight hours.

Its 9th Operations Group is a descendant organization of the 9th Group (Observation), one of the 13 original combat air groups formed by the Army before World War II.

During World War II, the 9th Bombardment Group (Very Heavy) was an air combat unit of the United States Army Air Forces. Active for over 60 years, the 9th RW was a component wing of Strategic Air Command's deterrent force throughout the Cold War, performing strategic reconnaissance on a worldwide basis.

== History ==
For additional history and lineage, see 9th Operations Group

=== Fairfield-Suisun Air Force Base ===
see also: Robert F. Travis

On 1 May 1949 the 9th Strategic Reconnaissance Wing was activated at Fairfield-Suisun Air Force Base, California, renamed Travis Air Force Base in 1951. The Air Force also activated the re-designated 9th Strategic Reconnaissance Group and the 1st, 5th, and 99th Strategic Reconnaissance Squadrons.

The 9th SRW's mission was to obtain complete data through visual, photographic, electronic, and weather reconnaissance operations. To carry out this mission, the wing flew RB-29 Superfortresses and a few RB-36 Peacemakers. The 9th Reconnaissance Technical Squadron also joined the 9th Strategic Reconnaissance Wing on 1 May 1949. It also performed its mission with components of 5th Strategic Reconnaissance Wing, from November 1949 – February 1951. The reconnaissance mission continued for only eleven months.

On 1 April 1950, the Air Force redesignated the 9th SRW as the 9th Bombardment Wing, Heavy, with similar redesignations of the 9th Group and the 1st, 5th, and 99th Squadrons. Seven months later, on 2 November, the wing and subordinate units were again re-designated to Bombardment, Medium with the transfer of the RB-36s, leaving the wing at B-29 Superfortress unit. In early February 1951, the Air Force realigned its flying operation and placed the flying squadrons directly under control of the wings. The Air Force, therefore, placed the 9th Bombardment Group in Records Unit status, then inactivated the group on 16 June 1952. On 4 January 1955, the Air Force bestowed upon the 9th Wing the honors of the inactive 9th Group, the operational headquarters unit before and during World War II.

=== Mountain Home Air Force Base ===
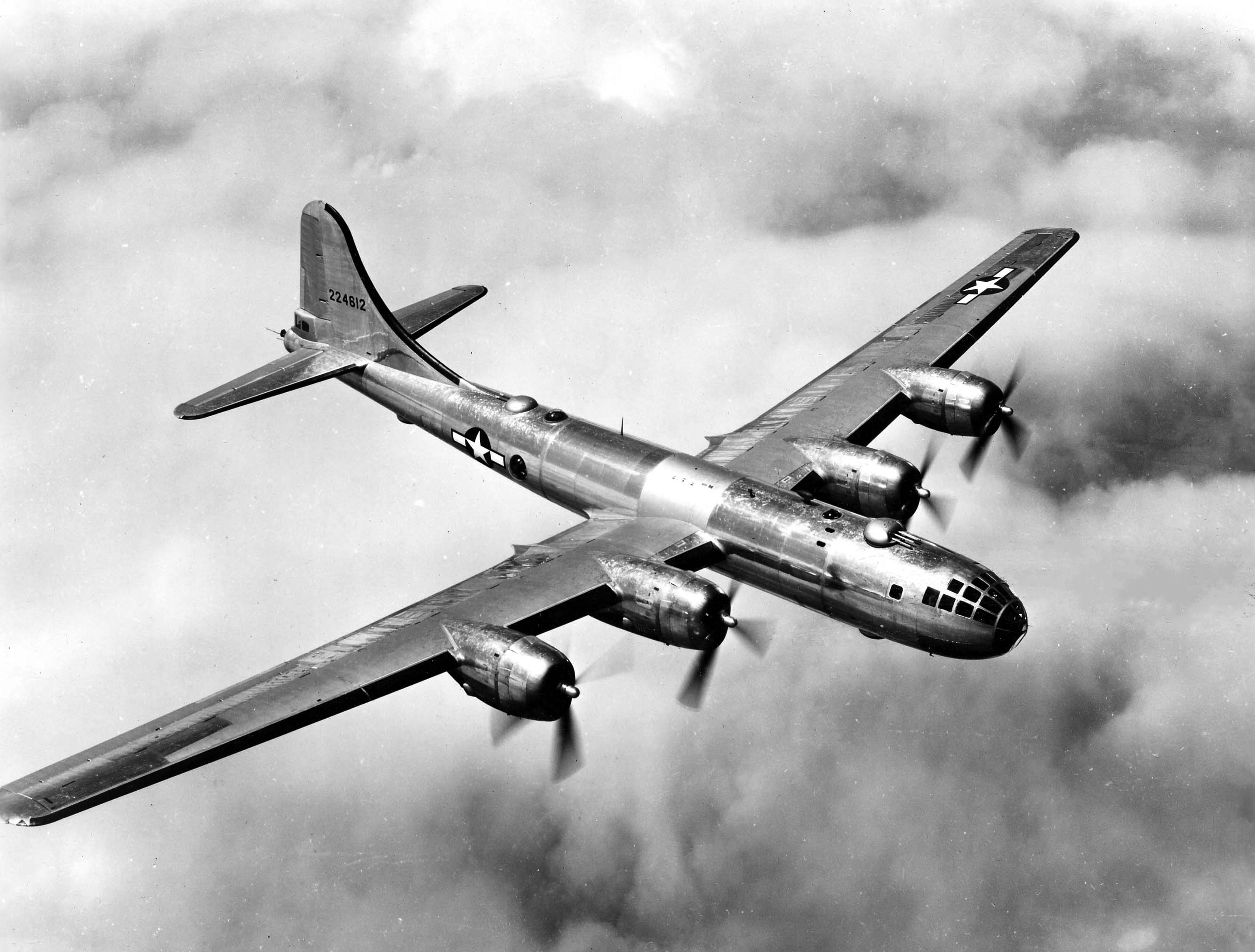
B-29 in flight

The 9th Bombardment Wing remained at Fairfield-Suisun AFB flying B-29s until 1 May 1953. On 1 May, the Strategic Air Command assumed jurisdiction of Mountain Home Air Force Base, Idaho, from the Military Air Transport Service and transferred the 9th Bomb Wing to the base. Developed for bomber training during the war, Mountain Home AFB had recently been an Air Resupply And Communications Service special operations base for MATS, and had phased down its operations. MATS wanted to use Fairfield-Suisun as a West Coast aerial port. SAC could expand Mountain Home for a large bomber base and its relative isolation was also desirable away from the inherent problems of stationing jet bombers in the urban areas halfway between Sacramento and San Francisco, California.

Although some personnel began arriving at Mountain Home early in April, the Wing and its B-29s moved in May. Simultaneously, the 2d Air Refueling Squadron at Davis-Monthan AFB, Arizona, became the 9th Air Refueling Squadron and transferred to the 9th Bombardment Wing at Mountain Home AFB.

With the arrival of the 9th Bomb Wing at Mountain Home, the base planned a vast construction program not only to accommodate the wing's personnel and offices, but also in anticipation of the acquisition of B-47s to replace the World War II-era obsolete B‑29s. On 15 September 1954, Colonel William C. Kingsbury, commander of the 9th Bomb Wing, landed at Mountain Home in the wing's first B-47 "Stratojet", The remainder of the planes arrived over the next few months. By June 1955, the 9th BW was ready for a mobility test. Early that month, bombers and crews spanned the continent and the Atlantic Ocean for a 60-day temporary duty assignment to a base in England to test the wing's mobility training concept.

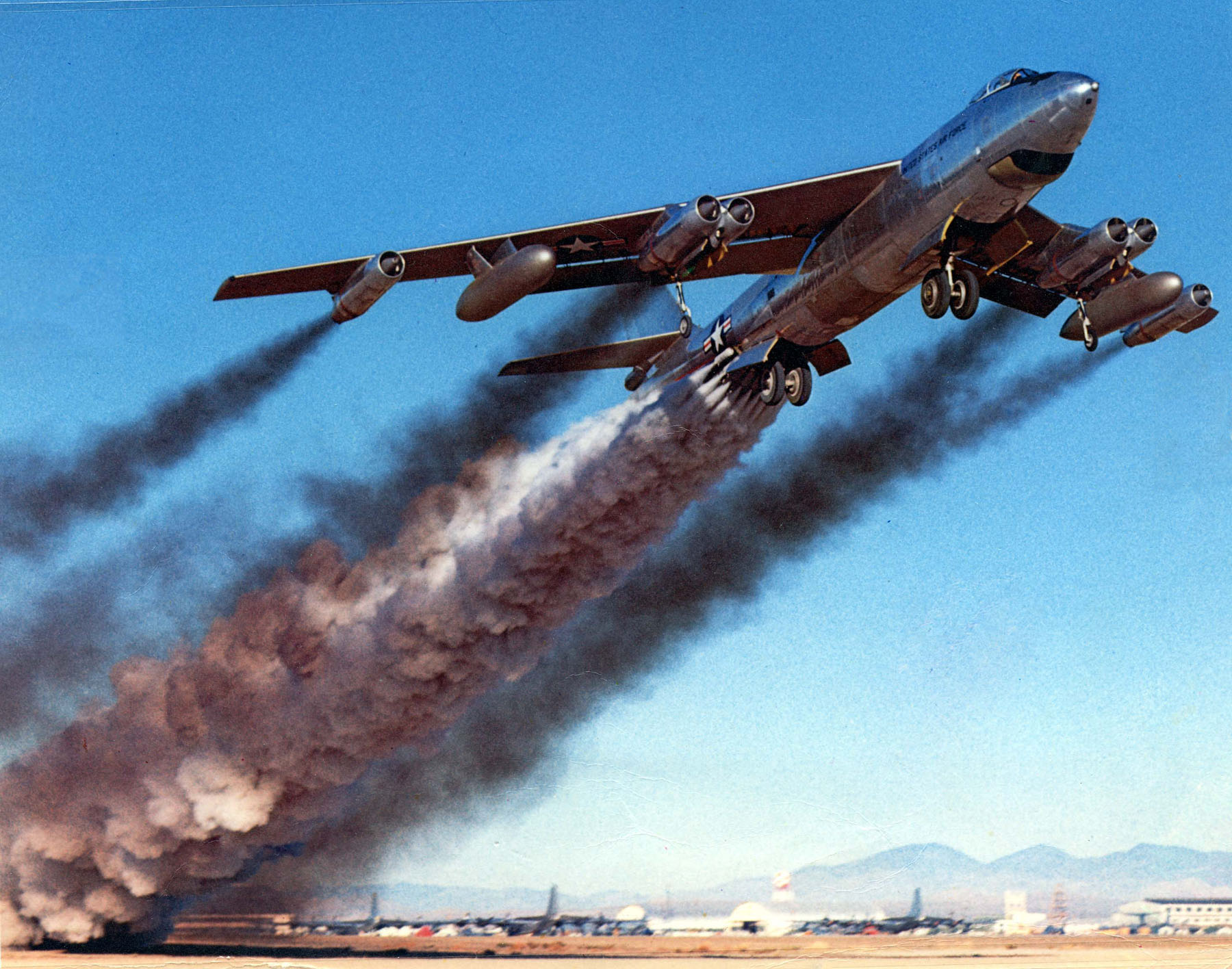
B-47B using JATO bottles to reduce takeoff distance in 1954

In November 1955, the 9th Bomb Wing's B-47Es flew from MHAFB to New Zealand, a distance of 8,300 miles (13,400 km), nonstop with the aid of aerial refueling. This was the longest point-to-point flight for any Strategic Air Command aircraft or unit up to that time.

In the decade after World War II, the development of faster aircraft and missiles steadily reduced reaction time. With the arrival of the missile age, SAC had to be ready to launch its armada of nuclear bombers within 15 minutes for a retaliatory strike. After almost two years of planning, SAC developed a new organization. Nicknamed FRESH APPROACH and designed to ensure a 15-minute response time, the new organization required extensive testing for practicality, mobility, and economy before command leaders were willing to discard the proven structure. On 1 July 1957, the 9th Bomb Wing was one of three SAC units to begin "service-testing" the new deputy commander system of management.

From July through December 1957, the 9th Wing implemented FRESH APPROACH and worked out the "kinks" of the new organization. The test came during a large SAC mobility and overseas deployment exercise. The 9th BW was the only participating unit with the deputy-commander organizational structure. Between October 1957 and January 1958, elements of the 9th Bombardment Wing and 9th Air Refueling Squadron scattered from Elmendorf AFB, Alaska to Andersen AFB, Guam. Although some problems occurred during the overseas mobility test, the 9th Wing Commander firmly supported the new concept. When the wing redeployed to Mountain Home AFB in mid-January 1958, it remained in the FRESH APPROACH organizational structure.

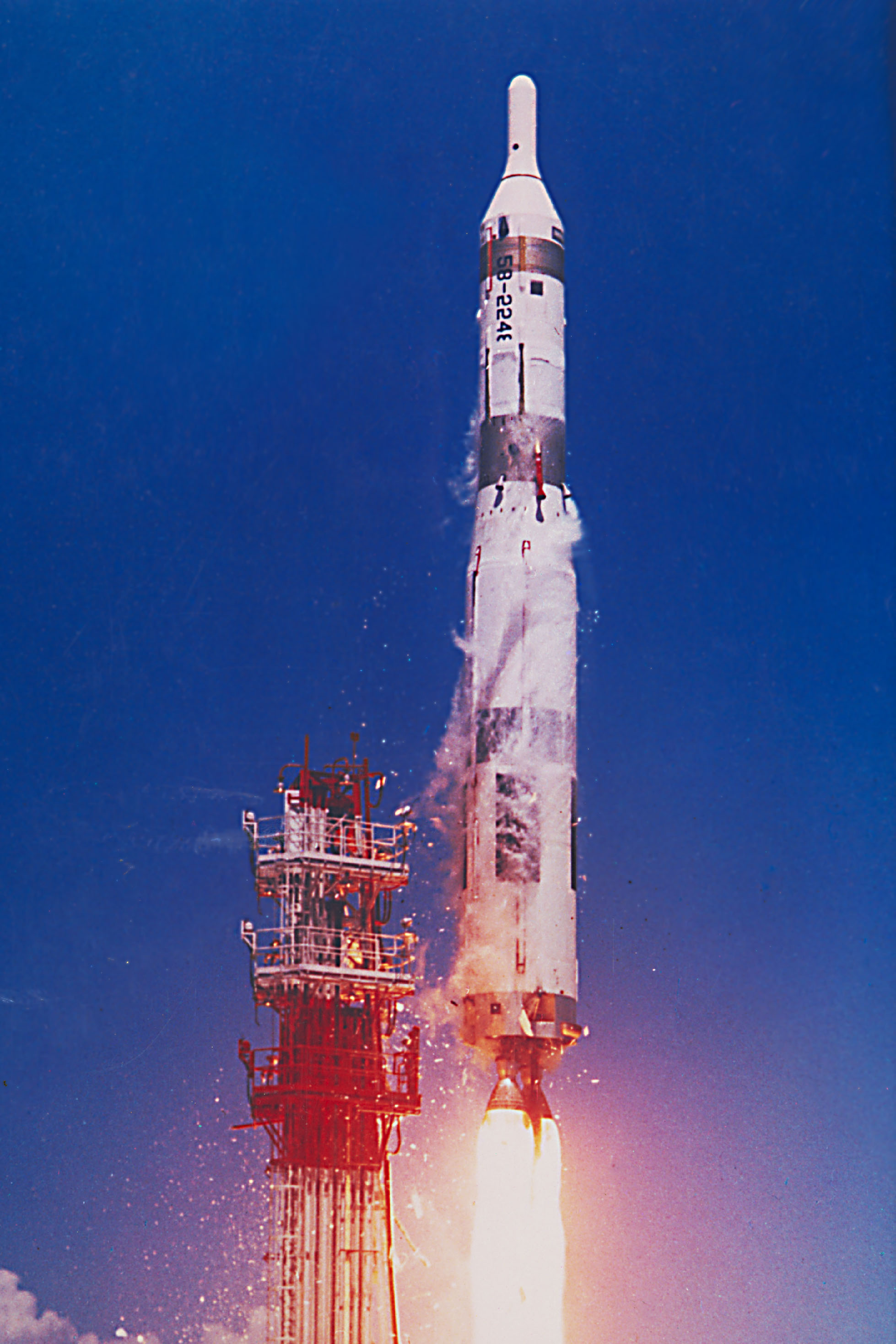
Launch of a Titan I ICBM from Cape Canaveral

On 1 October 1958, the Air Force officially adopted the deputy-commander concept and the 9th Bomb Wing became the first unit to officially convert to the new organizational structure. The change made it possible for the Air Force to launch an immediate retaliatory strike in response to nuclear attack on the United States. Massive retaliation became a cornerstone of national policy and an effective deterrent to perceived threats. For its meritorious service in testing and refining the reorganization, the 9th Bombardment Wing received the Air Force Outstanding Unit Award.

To reflect its expanding role as a bomber-missile unit, the 9th Bombardment Wing became the 9th Strategic Aerospace Wing on 1 April 1962. On 13 April, the wing received its first HGM-25A Titan I multistage intercontinental ballistic missile (ICBM). The Wing continued to fulfill its nuclear deterrence role until 1966.

Between 1962 and 1965, the 9th Bomb Wing operated several EB-47E Stratojets, a classified program which were electronics countermeasure conversions of the standard B-47E. These was equipped with what was known as the Phase IV (or Blue Cradle) ECM package, consisting of 16 AN/ALT-6B electronic jammers mounted on a cradle inside the bomb bay. Some of the EB-47ss carried a pressurized capsule inside the bomb bay that carried two electronics warfare officers that operated a suite of up to 13 different jammers that could focus on specific threats.

On 8 November 1965, SAC and Tactical Air Command completed a transfer agreement assigning Mountain Home to TAC effective 1 January 1966. The 9th Air Refueling Squadron, inactivated on 15 December 1965. On 1 January, the 9th Strategic Aerospace Wing became a tenant unit and was declared non-operational; it began final phase‑out at MHAFB, with the last B-47E departing on 10 February 1966; personnel followed soon after.

=== Beale Air Force Base ===
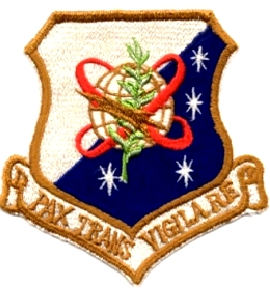
Emblem of the 4200th Strategic Reconnaissance Wing

In July 1964, President Lyndon B. Johnson announced the development of the Lockheed SR-71 Blackbird strategic reconnaissance aircraft. This new and advanced aircraft would give SAC a reconnaissance capability that far exceeded any then available in terms of speed, altitude, and increased area coverage. In December 1964, the Department of Defense announced that the 4200th Strategic Reconnaissance Wing would activate at Beale Air Force Base, California on 1 January 1965 as the parent unit of the SR‑71. To prepare Beale AFB for its new mission, contractors lengthened the runway, remodeled the former Air Defense Command Semi-Automatic Ground Environment building, and constructed several new facilities, including 337 additional housing units. The wing was assigned to the 14th Strategic Aerospace Division and consisted of the 4201st Strategic Reconnaissance Squadron, three maintenance squadrons and the 4203d Reconnaissance Technical Squadron.

In January 1966, the first SR-71 touched down on the Beale runway. The first T-38 Talon, a Northrop-built aircraft to be used as a trainer and chase plane for the SR-71, had arrived six months earlier. In October 1965, Fifteenth Air Force suggested the 9th Bombardment Wing be redesignated as the 9th Strategic Reconnaissance Wing to continue the history of the 9th. The Air Force accepted the suggestion and on 25 June 1966, the 4200th wing and its components were discontinued and the 9th Strategic Reconnaissance Wing transferred to Beale to take its place. The Air Force also activated the 9th Reconnaissance Technical Squadron to replace the 4203d Reconnaissance Technical Squadron. Both the 1st and 99th squadrons moved with the 9th, while the 5th inactivated.

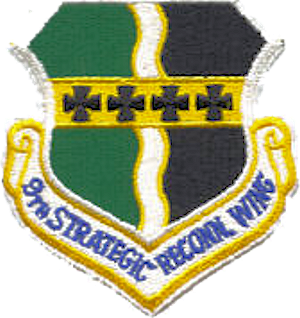
Emblem of the 9th Strategic Reconnaissance Wing

For the remainder of 1966, the 9th Strategic Reconnaissance Wing developed the organization and infrastructure necessary for SR-71 operations. The wing included a Director of Intelligence and a Director of Tests, who monitored the exhaustive testing program in the primary stages. The wing also needed its own supply squadron to handle the specialized supplies and equipment this unique aircraft would need. When the 9th SRW passed the Maintenance Standardization and Evaluation Team (MSET) inspection in March 1967, with the highest rating ever given a SAC wing, wing leaders knew their unit was ready.

==== Vietnam War ====
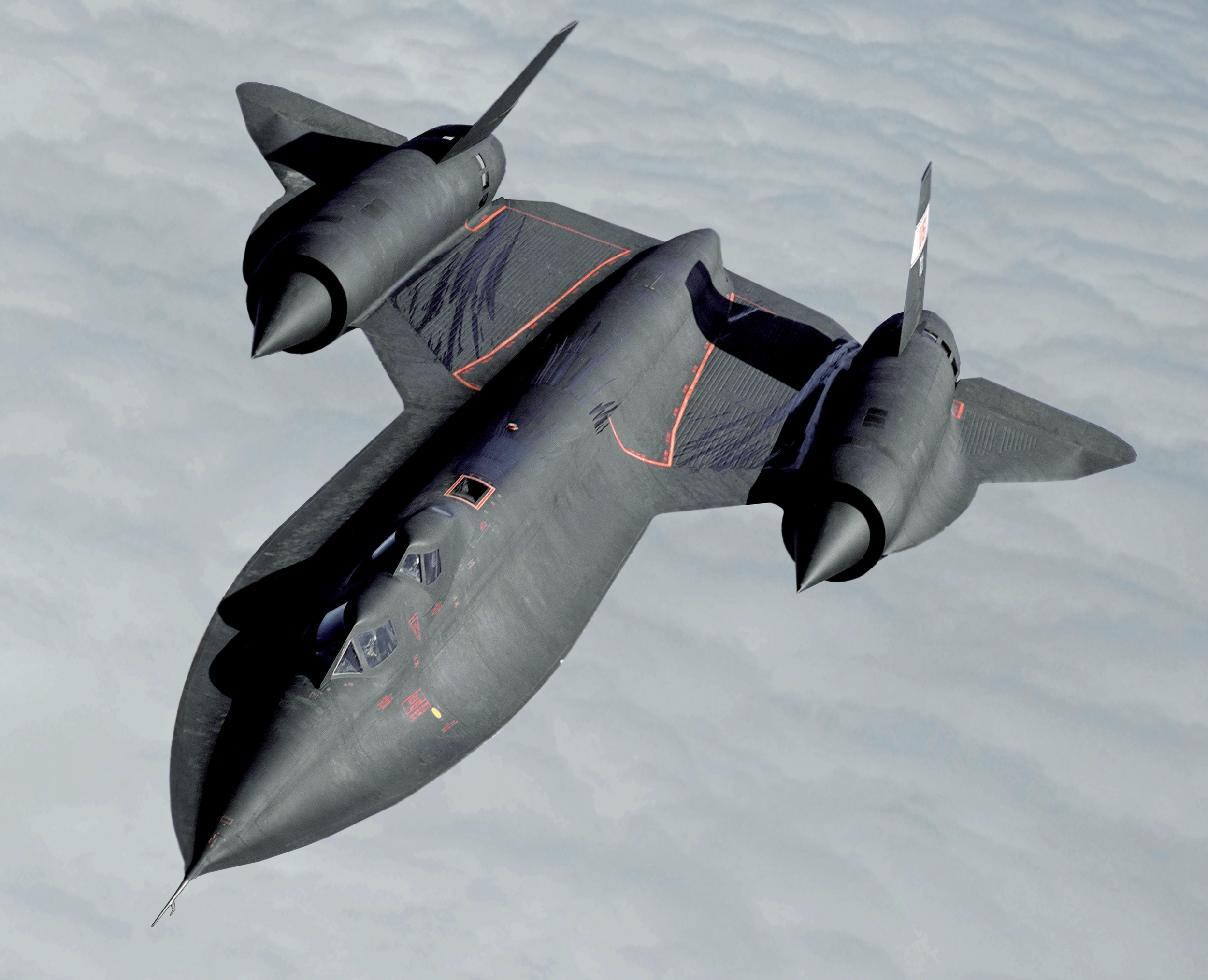
Lockheed SR-71 in flight

The SR-71 quickly became an important information source for U.S. commanders engaged in the Vietnam War. Until the end of the war in 1975, the 9th SRW gathered photographic and electronic intelligence data on the Southeast Asian nations involved in the conflict. Despite the SR-71's speed and operating altitude, crews risked their lives daily to obtain the latest and best reconnaissance data. Rescuers used SR-71 photos of North Vietnam to plan the 1970 raid on the Son Tay prisoner-of-war camp to free American Prisoners of war.

==== Post-Vietnam era ====
Following the end of American involvement in Vietnam, the 9th SRW turned to more peaceful accomplishments. The most spectacular of these were the SR-71 speed runs from New York to London and from London to Los Angeles. On 1 September 1974, Major James Sullivan and his RSO, Major Noel Widdefield, flew their SR-71 from New York to London in one hour, 55 minutes, 42 seconds, an average speed of 1,817 mph (2,924 km/h). A Royal Air Force F‑4M Phantom II had set the old record of four hours, 46 minutes in 1969. A few days later, on 13 September, Captain Harold "Buck" Adams, with Major William Machorek as RSO, established another record, flying the 5,465 miles (8,795 km) from London to Los Angeles in three hours, 48 minutes.

The wing's assault on speed records continued in 1976. On 27 July, Major Adolphus Bledsoe, pilot, and Major John Fuller, RSO, flew the SR-71 over the 1,000-kilometer closed-course at 2,092 mph (3,367 km/h), beating the Soviet MiG-25 "Foxbat's" record of 1,853 mph (2,982 km/h) by more than 200 mph (320 km/h). The next day, Captain Eldon Joersz, with Major George T. Morgan as RSO, broke the YF-12A's record of 2,070 for the 15–25 kilometer straight course by flying 2,194 mph (3,531 km/h). Also, on 28 July, Captain Robert Helt and his RSO, Major Larry Elliot, broke the YF‑12A's altitude record for horizontal flight flying at a sustained altitude of 85,068.997 feet (25,929 m).

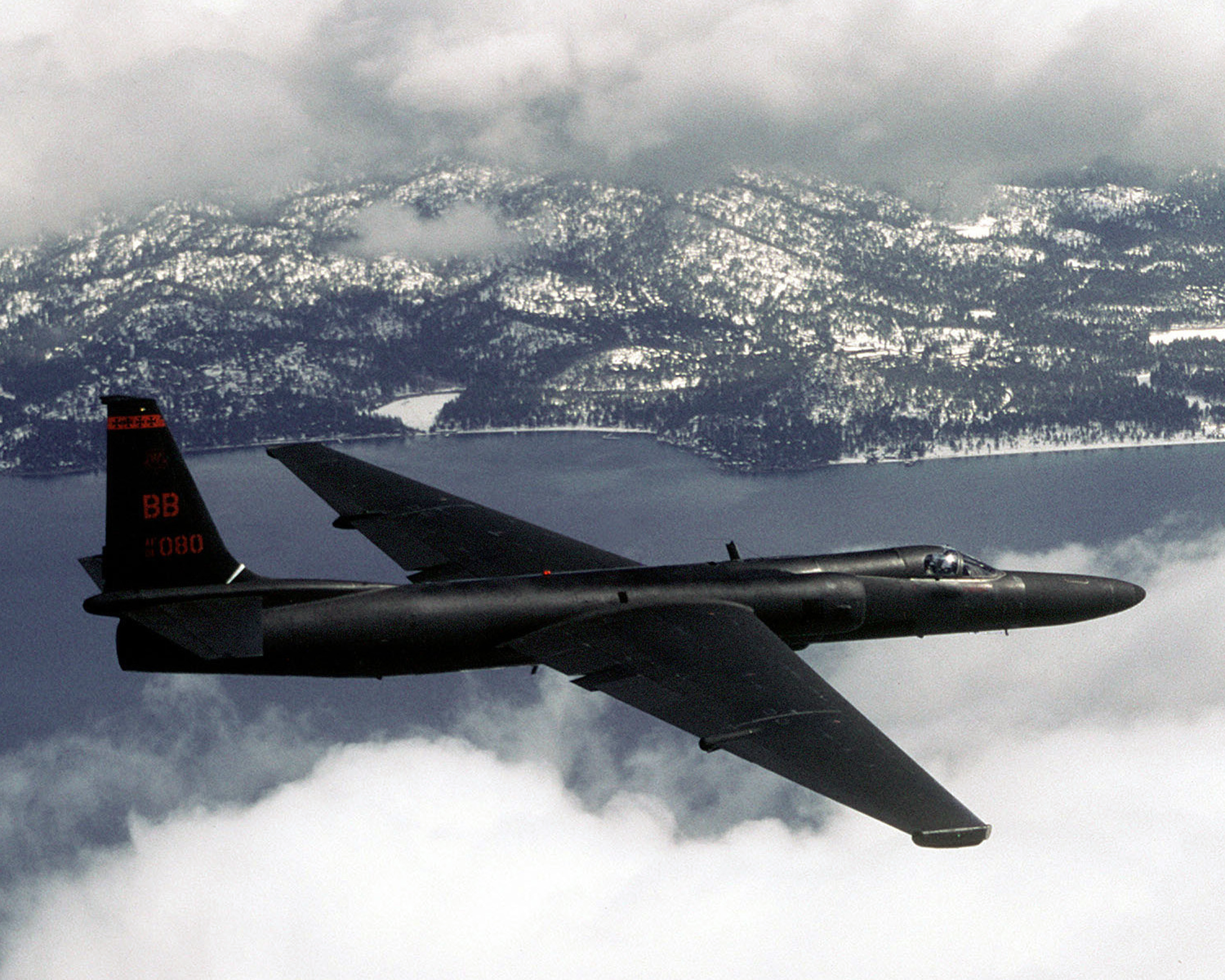
U-2 Dragon Lady 80-1080 from the 9th Reconnaissance Wing

On 1 July 1976, the 99th Strategic Reconnaissance Squadron rejoined the 9th Strategic Reconnaissance Wing as part of a realignment of SAC strategic reconnaissance units. The Lockheed U-2R-equipped 100th Strategic Reconnaissance Wing at Davis-Monthan AFB, Arizona, one of the oldest SAC strategic reconnaissance wing, The 99th SRS was reactivated at U-Tapao RTAFB in Thailand OL-UA in November 1972 and there till 1976 under the 100th SRW, rejoined the 9th Strategic Reconnaissance wing again after they had inactivated at Beale AFB on 1 April 1971.( AF fact sheet) Also the 100th SRW became the 100th Air Refueling Wing. The 349th Strategic Reconnaissance Squadron whose pilots flew the U-2 and 350th Strategic Reconnaissance Squadron that flew C-130s(releasing) and CH-53(recovering) the flying AQM-34 Firebee drones in SEA became Air refueling Squadrons were activated under the 100th Air Refueling Wing. The consolidation smoothed the reconnaissance tasking and response process. The consolidation of the 9th and 100th Strategic Reconnaissance Wings provided SAC with the following composite organization:

- 1st Strategic Reconnaissance Squadron (SR-71 Blackbird)
- 99th Strategic Reconnaissance Squadron (Lockheed U-2R)
- 349th Air Refueling Squadron (KC-135 Stratotanker)
- 350th Air Refueling Squadron (KC-135 Stratotanker)

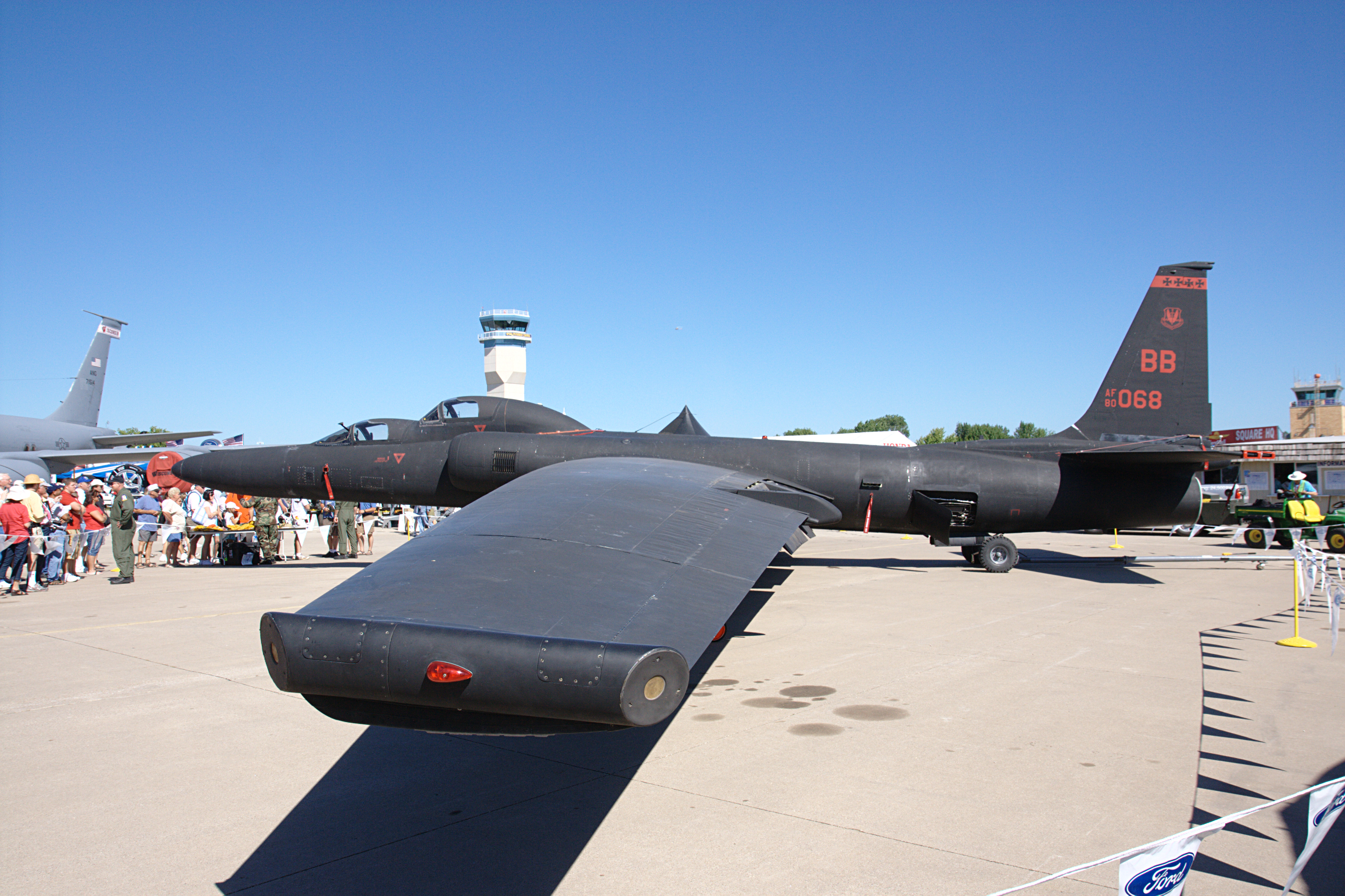
Lockheed TR-1A U-2 Variant

The U-2R, an improved version of the 1955 vintage U-2A, could spend more time "on-station" and cover longer distances without refueling than the SR-71. It was also less expensive to operate. The 9th SRW continued to evolve as the Air Force's first TR‑1 U-2 variant arrived at Beale AFB on 1 August 1981 and the first production model was assigned six weeks later. Later, the Air Force would drop the TR-1 designation and this aircraft series would also be called U-2s.

With the new aircraft's arrival, the Air Force activated the 4029th Strategic Reconnaissance Training Squadron on 1 August 1981 to train all TR-1 and U-2 pilots. The TR-1s were transferred to the newly activated 17th Reconnaissance Wing in October 1982. A descendant of the U-2, the Lockheed-built TR-1 would gather tactical reconnaissance data at RAF Alconbury, United Kingdom for USAFE.

In 1986 the Air Force changed the 4029th SRTS designation to the 5th Strategic Reconnaissance Training Squadron, renewing the 5th Squadron's longtime association with the 9th Wing. In February 1986 a devastating flood swept through the neighboring towns of Linda and Olivehurst. The wing welcomed 4,502 people forced from their homes by the flood. The base set up several centers to shelter and feed the evacuees until the water level dropped and they could return to their homes.

As the importance of intelligence collection increased in the 1980s, the wing operated detachments (permanent units) and operating locations (temporary sites) around the world. The British government publicly announced, on 5 April 1982, the stationing of the SR-71 at Detachment 4, RAF Mildenhall, United Kingdom. The wing also established the U-2 at Operating Location OLYMPIC FLAME (OL-OF), in Turkey. becoming Det. 5.

As world events dictate the need for accurate and timely reconnaissance data, the 9th Strategic Reconnaissance Wing has operated OL's and detachments around the globe, including South Korea, Panama, Okinawa, Cyprus, and Saudi Arabia. An Air Force Outstanding Unit Award (7th oak leaf cluster) for 1 July 1981 to 30 June 1982 confirmed the excellence with which the 9th Strategic Reconnaissance Wing performed its expanded mission.

In July 1989 the wing flew several missions over Ethiopia, searching for an airplane carrying Congressman Mickey Leland. Later, in October 1989, at the request of the Federal Emergency Management Agency, the wing flew U-2 photo missions over the San Francisco and Oakland areas after the strong Loma Prieta earthquake.

A unique chapter of the 9th's history ended on 1 January 1990 when the SR-71 retired. High maintainability and operating costs and the availability of similar intelligence from other sources convinced Air Force officials the aircraft was no longer vital to the national defense. But the Blackbird went out with gusto. On 28 March 1990 Major Don Watkins and his RSO, Major Bob Fowlkes, flew the last SR-71 flight from Beale AFB to the United States Air Force Museum at Wright Patterson AFB, Ohio. Later 3 SR-71s were reactivated in the mid 90s as Det. 2 at Edwards AFB, Ca. under the 9th Operation Group (OG) and canceled again in 1999.

In the last month of operations from Beale AFB, the SR-71 set the following speed records:

- West Coast to East Coast of USA

(National Record-Speed Over a Recognized Course): Coast to Coast Distance: 2,404.05 statute miles, Time: 1 hr 07 min 53.69 secs, Average Speed: 2,124.51 mph

- Los Angeles To Washington D.C.

(World Record): Distance: 2,299.67 statute miles, Time: 1 hr 04 min 19.89 secs, Average Speed: 2,144.83 mph (3,451.77 km/h)

- St Louis To Cincinnati

(World Record): Distance: 311.44 statute miles, Time: 8 mins 31.97 secs, Average Speed: 2,189.94 mph (3,524.37 km/h)

- Kansas City To Washington D.C.

(World Record): Distance: 942.08 statute miles, Time: 25 mins 58.53 secs, Average Speed: 2,176.08 mph (3,502.06 km/h)

The above records were confirmed on 15 March 1990 after the initial release on 6 March 1990, in the same corresponding order of 212.62 mph, 2153.24 mph, 2205.48 mph and 2242.48 mph

==== Gulf War ====
The wing's most notable intelligence operation took place from August 1990 to March 1991 in Operation Desert Shield and Desert Storm. In the largest U-2 deployment ever, the wing flew more than 800 missions over the Persian Gulf region. U‑2s tracked Iraqi troop and armor buildups, assessed bomb damage, and monitored a massive oil spill in the Persian Gulf. U-2 pilots even alerted the anti-missile network of inbound Scud missiles. When the ground war ended and most troops returned home, 9th Wing personnel and the U-2s remained in the region to help the United Nations verify Iraqi compliance with the terms of the cease‑fire agreement.

The wing's KC-135Q tankers also contributed during the 1991 Gulf War. Carrying U-2 support people and equipment, the tankers allowed the wing to deploy immediately and begin flying reconnaissance missions over the region. During this initial deployment, the tankers escorted F-117A stealth fighters to the war zone, then served as the F-117's primary refuelers during the war.

==== Post Cold War ====
When the Air Force inactivated Strategic Air Command on 1 June 1992 the 9th Strategic Reconnaissance Wing was redesignated 9th Wing. This action also activated the 9th Operations Group, the linear descendant of the 9th Bombardment Group of the Second World War, the 9th Support Group, the 9th Logistics Group, and the 9th Medical Group. These new groups would streamline and consolidate wing operations. Part of the changes meant that the 1883d Communications Squadron, part of Air Force Communications Command, was effectively replaced by a new 9th Communications Squadron, part of the 9th Support Group and activated on 1 September 1991. The reorganization also strengthened the wing's chain of command by replacing deputy commanders with group commanders.

Further Air Force reorganization moved the KC‑135 tankers from Air Combat Command to Air Mobility Command in 1994, therefore, on 1 October 1994, the wing's designation changed again to the 9th Reconnaissance Wing to reflect a more specialized mission.

Another step in the wing's restructuring, the 9th and 609th Organizational Maintenance Squadrons inactivated and the flightline maintenance people moved to the flying squadrons. Several former OMS elements (tanker phase, U-2 periodic inspections, aero repair, and the wheel and tire shop) transferred to the 9th Field Maintenance Squadron, which was re-designated the 9th Maintenance Squadron.

In 1994 Congress allocated $100 million to reactivate three SR-71s. The Senate Appropriations Committee acknowledged that SR-71 had a unique operational capability that no other system could match. Committee members believed the reasons for the aircraft's 1990 retirement were no longer valid. The Wing activated Detachment 2 at Edwards AFB, California to support SR-71 operations. The Air Force accepted the first renovated Blackbird on 28 June 1995. The SR-71 was again operational with a mission-ready crew on 29 August 1995.

In the early 1990s the wing's personnel and aircraft provided reconnaissance coverage during the Croatian War of Independence and the Bosnia-Hercegovina. Later, wing U-2s verified compliance with the Dayton Peace Accords that ended the immediate crisis. Then, when Serbia began the "ethnic cleansing" of Albanians in Kosovo, NATO responded with the bombing campaign Operation Allied Force. During Operation Allied Force, 9th Reconnaissance Wing U-2s provided over 80% of the targeting intelligence for NATO forces. NATO leadership credited the U-2 with the destruction of 39 surface-to-air missile sites and 28 Serbian Armed Forces aircraft.

President Bill Clinton exercised his line-item veto power at the time, however, and eliminated the Congressionally approved $39 million allocated to the SR-71 program in the fiscal year (FY) 1998 budget. Detachment 2 immediately ceased operations. The United States Supreme Court later declared presidential line-item veto authority unconstitutional. The future of the SR-71 program remained uncertain. Congress did not include funding for the program in its FY 1999 budget. On 7 April 1998, Air Combat Command received a message from the Office of the Secretary of the Air Force ordering cessation of SR-71 operations and disposal of all related assets. The last member of Detachment 2 left Edwards AFB, CA on 10 January 1999. Upon transfer of the two remaining airframes to Air Force Materiel Command, Air Combat Command declared the SR-71 retirement complete as of 15 July 1999. Air Combat Command inactivated Detachment 2, 9th Operations Group, Edwards AFB, CA on 1 August 1999.

==== 2010s ====
The 9 RW is responsible for providing national and theater command authorities with timely, reliable, high-quality, high-altitude reconnaissance products. To accomplish this mission, the wing is equipped with the nation's fleet of U-2 and RQ-4 reconnaissance aircraft and associated support equipment. The wing also maintains a high state of readiness in its expeditionary combat support forces for potential deployment in response to theater contingencies.

The wing is composed of more than 3,000 personnel in four groups at Beale and multiple overseas operating locations. Colonel Keagan L. McLeese was appointed the wing commander in July 2024.

The 9th Reconnaissance Wing is the "single-point manager" for the RQ-4 Global Hawk high-altitude reconnaissance fleet.

On 11 October 2019, the wing was reassigned from the Twenty-Fifth Air Force to the newly re-activated Sixteenth Air Force, also known as Air Forces Cyber. The Sixteenth Air Force specialises in global intelligence, surveillance and reconnaissance, cyber, electronic warfare and information operations.

== Component units ==
Unless otherwise indicated, units are based at Beale AFB, California.

9th Wing Staff

- 9th Comptroller Squadron

9th Operations Group

- 1st Reconnaissance Squadron – U-2S Dragon Lady, RQ-4 Global Hawk and T-38A Talon
- 5th Reconnaissance Squadron – U-2S Dragon Lady (Osan AB, South Korea)
- 9th Operations Support Squadron
- 99th Reconnaissance Squadron – U-2S Dragon Lady
- 427th Reconnaissance Squadron – RQ-180
- Detachment 1 – U-2S Dragon Lady (RAF Akrotiri, Cyprus)
- Detachment 2 – U-2S Dragon Lady (Osan AB, S.Korea)
- Detachment 3 – U-2S Dragon Lady
- Detachment 4 – U-2S Dragon Lady (Andersen AFB, Guam)

9th Maintenance Group

- 9th Aircraft Maintenance Squadron
- 9th Maintenance Squadron
- 9th Munitions Squadron

9th Mission Support Group

- 9th Civil Engineer Squadron
- 9th Communications Squadron
- 9th Contracting Squadron
- 9th Force Support Squadron
- 9th Logistics Readiness Squadron
- 9th Security Forces Squadron

9th Medical Group

- 9th Health Care Operations Squadron
- 9th Medical Support Squadron
- 9th Operational Medical Readiness Squadron
- 9th Physiological Support Squadron

== Lineage ==
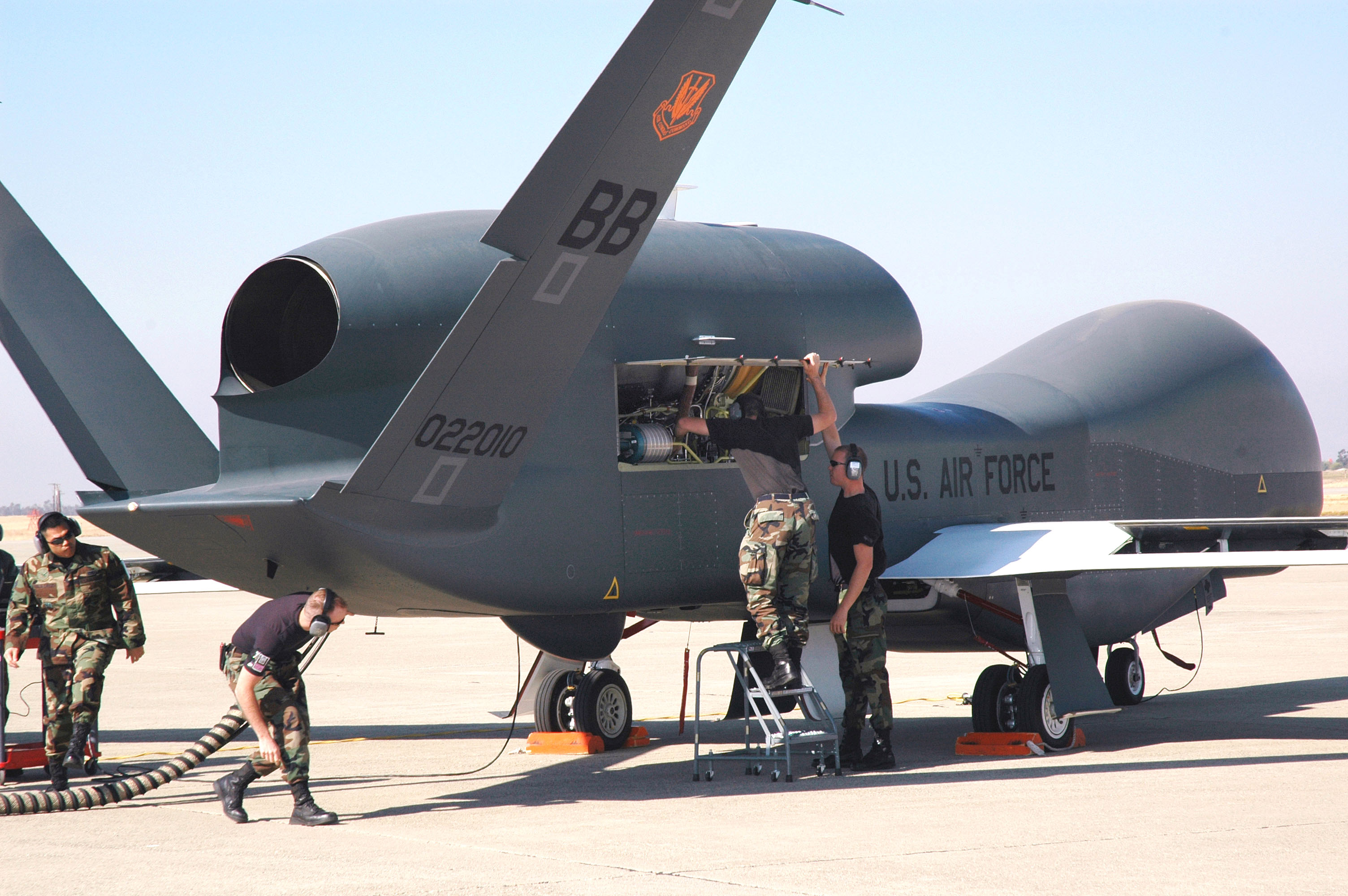
- A flight crew fuels a 9th RW RQ-4 Global Hawk
  Established as the 9th Strategic Reconnaissance Wing on 25 April 1949

Activated on 1 May 1949
Redesignated 9th Bombardment Wing, Heavy on 1 April 1950
Redesignated 9th Bombardment Wing, Medium on 2 October 1950
Redesignated 9th Strategic Aerospace Wing on 1 April 1962
Redesignated 9th Strategic Reconnaissance Wing on 25 June 1966
Redesignated 9th Wing on 1 September 1991
Redesignated 9th Reconnaissance Wing on 1 October 1993

=== Assignments ===
- 311th Air Division, 1 May 1949
- Second Air Force, 1 November 1949
- Fifteenth Air Force, 1 April 1950
- 14th Air Division, 10 February 1951
- Fifteenth Air Force, 1 May 1953

Attached to 7th Air Division, 23 May – 11 July 1955
Attached to 3d Air Division, 3–22 October 1955 and 1 October 1957 – c. 10 January 1958

- 813th Air Division (later 813th Strategic Aerospace Division), 15 July 1959
- 14th Strategic Aerospace Division (later 14th Air Division), 25 June 1966
- Second Air Force, 1 September 1991
- Twelfth Air Force, 1 July 1993
- Eighth Air Force, 1 October 2002
- Twelfth Air Force, 1 October 2009
- Twenty-Fifth Air Force, 1 October 2014
- Sixteenth Air Force, 11 October 2019 – present

=== Components ===
Wings

- 5th Strategic Reconnaissance Wing: attached 12 November 1949 – 10 February 1951

Groups

- 5th Strategic Reconnaissance Group: attached 9 November 1949 – 10 February 1951
- 9th Strategic Reconnaissance Group (later 9th Bombardment Group, 9th Operations Group): 1 May 1949 – 16 June 1952; 1 September 1991 – present
- 69th Reconnaissance Group: 19 September 2011 – 28 June 2019

Squadrons

- 1st Bombardment (later, 1st Strategic Reconnaissance) Squadron: attached 10 February 1951 – 15 June 1952, assigned 16 June 1952 – 1 September 1991
- 5th Bombardment (later, 5th Strategic Reconnaissance Training) Squadron: attached 10 February 1951 – 15 June 1952, assigned 16 June 1952 – 25 June 1966; assigned 1 July 1986 – 30 June 1990
- 6th Reconnaissance Squadron, 1992-Undeteremined
- 9th Air Refueling Squadron: 16 June 1952 – 15 December 1965 (detached 16 June 1952 – 30 April 1953)
- 38th Reconnaissance Squadron: attached 26 May-1 June 1949
- 95th Reconnaissance Squadron: 30 June 1991 – 15 September 1993
- 97th Air Refueling Squadron: 15 July 1961 – 1 July 1962 (detached)
- 99th Bombardment (later, 99th Strategic Reconnaissance) Squadron: attached 10 February 1951 – 15 June 1952, assigned 16 June 1952 – 1 April 1971; assigned 30 June 1976 – 1 September 1991
- 349th Air Refueling Squadron: 15 March 1983 – 1 September 1991
- 350th Air Refueling Squadron: 15 March 1983 – 1 September 1991
- 569th Strategic Missile Squadron: 1 June 1961 – 25 June 1965
- 658th Bombardment Squadron: 1 October 1958 – 1 January 1962
- 4029th Strategic Reconnaissance Training Squadron: 1 August 1981 – 1 July 1986
- 4364th Support (later, 4364th Post Attack Command and Control) Squadron: 20 July 1962 – 25 March 1965

Detachments

- 9th Strategic Reconnaissance Wing Detachment 1, Kadena AB, Okinawa, Japan (SR-71)

Also designated as: Operating Location 8; Operating Location RK
The SR-71's began arriving at Kadena (AKA "The Rock") in March 1968. The operation to transfer the SR-71's from Beale to Kadena was known as "Glowing Heat". On 15 March 1968, OL-8 was declared Operational Ready for SR-71 sorties. The first SR-71 arrived at Kadena on 9 March 1968 and the last aircraft departed on 21 January 1990.

- 9th Strategic Reconnaissance Wing Detachment 2, Osan AB, South Korea (U-2)

Assumed operations from 100th Strategic Reconnaissance Wing, OL-A, September 1976
In October 1994, Det 2 of the 9th RW became the 5th Reconnaissance Squadron (Still at Osan AB) classified reconnaissance mission and under the operational control of United States Pacific Command mainly supporting US forces in Korea.
Detachment 2 was reactivated and operated SR-71 aircraft from Edwards AFB, California, 1995–1998

- 9th Strategic Reconnaissance Wing Detachment 3, RAF Akrotiri, Cyprus (U-2)

Initially Central Intelligence Agency Detachment "G" (August 1970) after Egypt/Israel Suez Canal fighting and cease fire. Later permanent monitoring of Middle East Ceasefire after 1973 Yom Kippur War. Became 100th SRW OL "Olive Harvest" (1974). Turned over to 9th SRW September 1976, the U-2 operation at RAF Akrotiri continued to be called Operating Location OH until September 1980, then it became Detachment 3 of the 9th SRW, although the name OLIVE HARVEST continues. Two U-2's are stationed at RAF Akrotiri and they are still monitoring the ceasefire agreement between the Egypt and Israel although the present operations in Central Command requires further missions. U-2's also transit through RAF Akrotiri either on going into USAFCENT theater or returning to Beale AFB.

- 9th Strategic Reconnaissance Wing Detachment 4, RAF Mildenhall, England (SR-71)

SR-71 Reconnaissance Operations at Mildenhall were from April 1976 to 1990. Prior to Det 4 being established, UK permission was required for each sortie flown. The SR's stay was to be no longer than 20 days for each visit. On 5 April 1982 Prime Minister Margaret Thatcher announced that Det 4 would be a permanent SR-71 Detachment with two aircraft assigned. The United Kingdom remained in control of the more sensitive missions. The two aircraft Detachment ceased operations on 22 November 1989. The last aircraft departed the UK on 18 January 1990, the other SR-71 now at Duxford American Air Museum (#962).

- 9th Strategic Reconnaissance Wing Detachment 5, Patrick AFB, Florida (U-2)

Also designated as: Operating Location LF, primarily operated missions over Nicaragua, El Salvador, Haiti and other South American areas (OLYMPIC FIRE)
Prior to September 1976, OLYMPIC FIRE missions were flown by 100th SRW over Cuba, initially from McCoy AFB, Florida, and then from Patrick AFB from Aug 1972 to May 1974

- 9th Strategic Reconnaissance Wing Detachment 6, USAF Plant 42, Palmdale, California (SR-71)

Logistics and Depot-level overhaul (Norton AFB).

- 9th Strategic Reconnaissance Wing Operating Location UK, RAF Fairford, England (U-2)

Flew U-2 missions over Balkans in support of NATO operations in Bosnia during January to October 1995 following closure of RAF Alconbury. U-2 operations were then relocated to Istres France.

- 9th Strategic Reconnaissance Wing Operating Location FR, Istres AB, France (U-2)

Flew U-2 missions over Balkans in support of NATO operations in Bosnia and Kosovo during the late 1990s.

- 9th Strategic Reconnaissance Wing Operating Location OL-CH (Crested Harvest) (U-2)

King Fahd International Airport; Taif Air Base, Saudi Arabia (1991 Gulf War)

=== Stations ===
- Fairfield-Suisun Air Force Base (later Travis Air Force Base), California, 1 May 1949
- Mountain Home Air Force Base, Idaho, 1 May 1953
- Beale Air Force Base, California, 25 June 1966 – present

On 17 August 1990 two 9th SRW U-2's deployed to King Fahad and Taif from Beale. Also 2 U-2s from 9th SRW Det 2 at Osan AB. Also six TR-1s from 17th RW at RAF Alconbury.
Flew "OLYMPIC FLARE" Missions which saw aircraft equipped with SYERS, ASARS, IRIS, H-CAM and SENIOR SPAN sensors. On 21 September 1990 OL-CH was designated 1704th Reconnaissance Squadron (Provisional). During the deployment (Aug 90 – Feb 91) U-2s flew 564 missions; 4,561.6 hours flown.

- 4404th Provisional Wing, later: 363d Air Expeditionary Wing rotational deployment of U-2s from Beale, 1991–2003 at Prince Sultan AB, Saudi Arabia. (Ongoing CENTAF monitoring mission over Iraq)
- 380th Air Expeditionary Wing, Al Dhafra AB, United Arab Emirates, 99th Expeditionary Reconnaissance Squadron rotational deployment of U-2s from Beale since early 2002 – present (USAFCENT missions)

=== Aircraft and missiles ===
- B/RB-17 Flying Fortress, 1949–1950
- B-29 Superfortress, 1949–1954
- RB-29 Superfortress (Reconnaissance), 1949–1951
- KB-29 Superfortress (Tanker), 1953
- RB-36 Peacemaker, 1949–1950, 1951
- B-47 Stratojet, 1954–1966
- KC-97 Stratofreighter, 1954–1965
- EB-47 Stratojet, 1962–1965
- SR-71 Blackbird, 1966–1990, 1995–1997
- T-38 Talon, 1969–present
- Lockheed U-2, 1976–present
- TR-1, 1981–1993
- KC-135 Stratotanker, 1983–1993
- RQ-4 Global Hawk, 2006–present
- MC-12 Liberty, 2012–2015

- HGM-25A Titan I, 1962–1965

== Emblem ==
The crest and motto were approved for the 9th Reconnaissance Wing on 1 July 1952 upon its inherited lineage of the 9th Bombardment Group. The shield, in black and green, represents the old colors of the Air Service parted by a wavy line representing the Rio Grande and the 1st Aero Squadron's operations in 1916. On the gold band are four black crosses representing four World War I offensives, Aisne-Marne, Champagne-Marne, Meuse-Argonne, and St. Mihiel, in which squadrons later assigned to the 9th Wing fought. The crest recalls the service in Mexico of the 1st Aero Squadron.

== Awards/Decorations ==
Air Force Outstanding Unit Award

- 1 September 1991 to 30 June 1993
- 1 July 1994 to 30 June 1995
- 1 June 1996 to 31 May 1998
- 1 June 1998 to 31 May 2000
- 1 June 2000 to 31 May 2002
- 1 June 2011 to 31 May 2012

Air Force Meritorious Unit Award

- 1 June 2013 to 31 May 2014

== See also ==
- List of B-47 units of the United States Air Force
- List of B-29 units of the United States Air Force
- List of wings of the United States Air Force
