= 5th Reconnaissance Squadron =

5th Reconnaissance Squadron

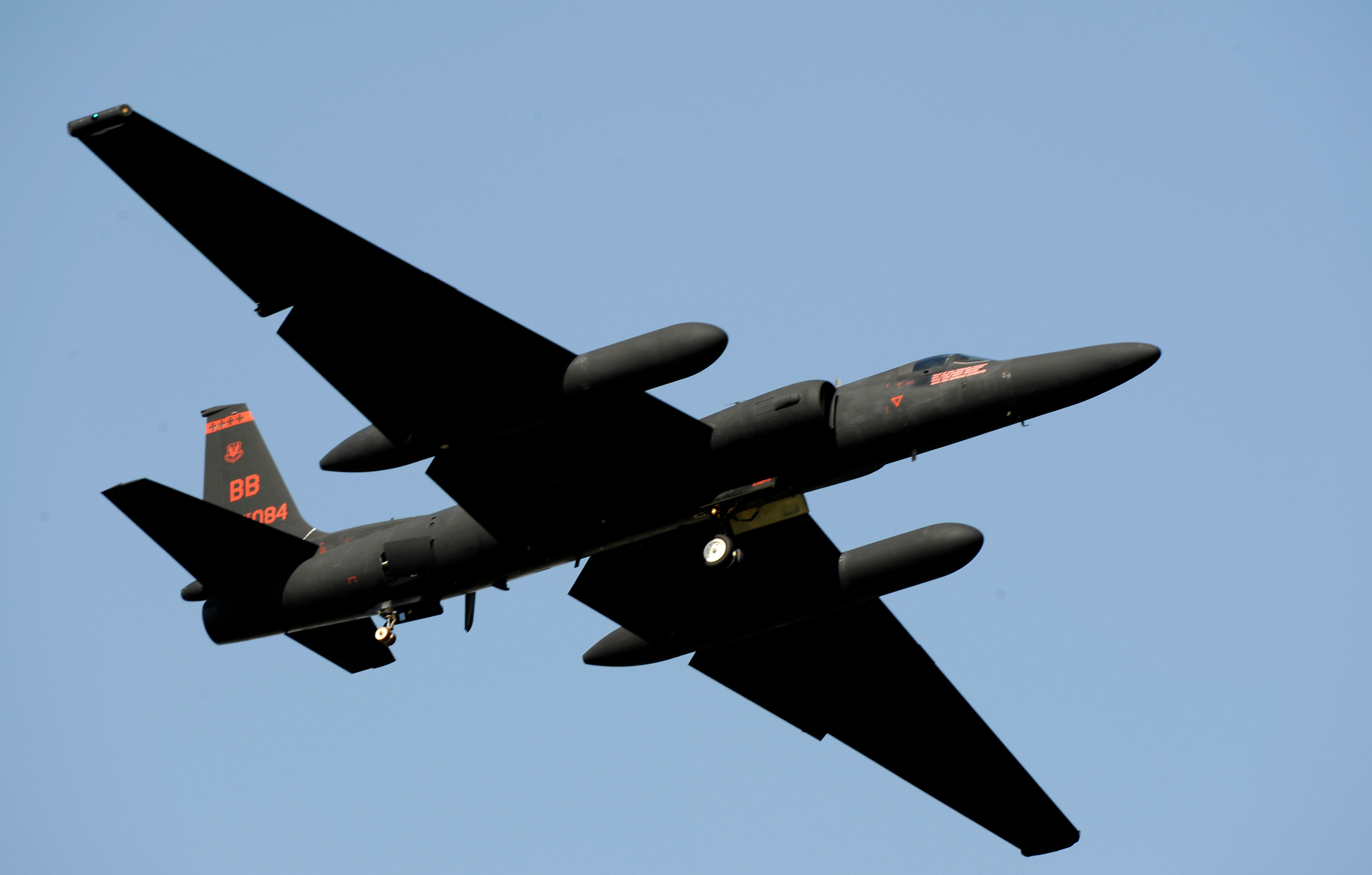
- A 5th Reconnaissance Squadron Lockheed U-2 performing a low approach at Osan AB
- Active: 1917–1918; 1919–1948; 1949–1966; 1986–1990; 1994–present
- Country: United States
- Branch: United States Air Force
- Role: Reconnaissance and Surveillance
- Part of: Air Combat Command; 9th Reconnaissance Wing; 9th Operations Group
- Garrison/HQ: Osan Air Base
- Nickname: Blackcats
- Engagements: World War I World War II (American Campaign) World War II (Asia/Pacific)

- Decorations: Distinguished Unit Citation (2x) Air Force Outstanding Unit Award (6x)

Insignia
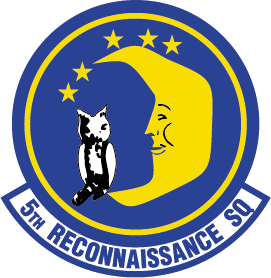
- 5th Reconnaissance Squadron emblem (Note: Approved 27 May 1924.)

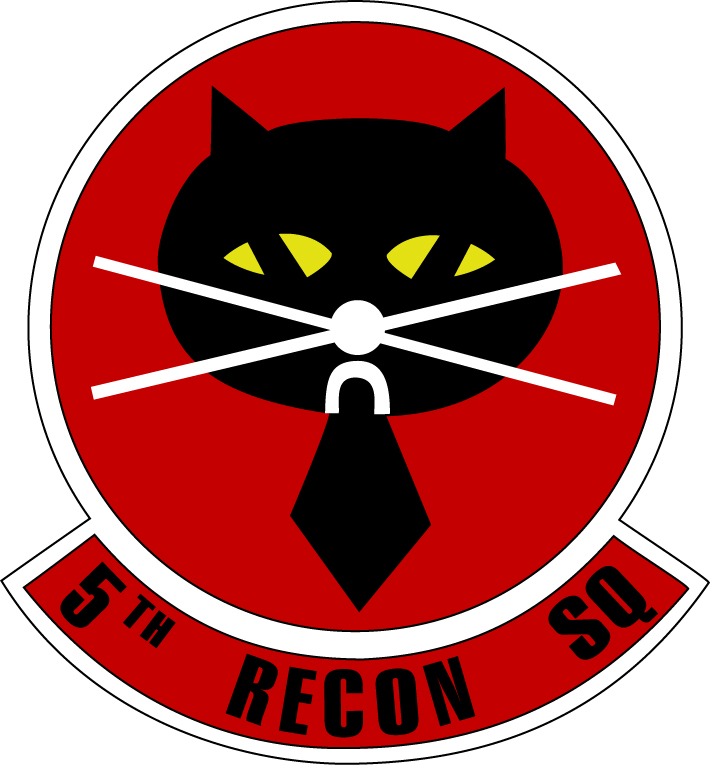
- 5th Reconnaissance Squadron morale patch

The 5th Reconnaissance Squadron is part of the 9th Reconnaissance Wing, assigned to Beale Air Force Base, California. It is stationed at Osan Air Base, South Korea as a Geographically Separated Unit (GSU). The squadron is the fifth oldest United States Air Force squadron, its history dating to 5 May 1917 as the World War I 5th Aero Squadron.

The squadron operates Lockheed U-2 aircraft conducting reconnaissance and surveillance missions. It carries out missions for U.S. Forces Korea, United States Pacific Command, Air Combat Command, along with other national authorities through the Joint Chiefs of Staff. There are approximately 200 personnel assigned to the 5 RS.

== History ==
=== World War I ===
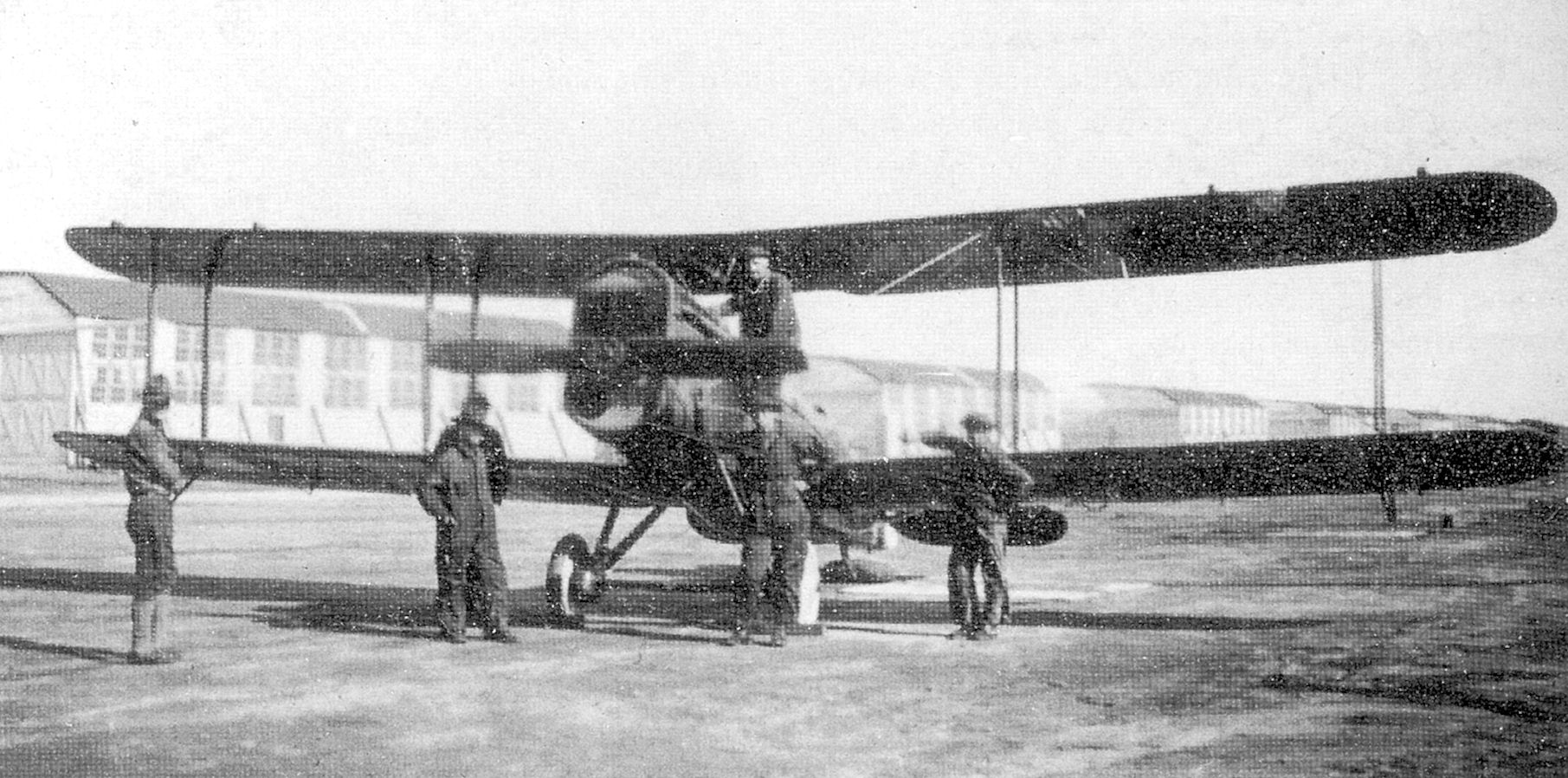
DH-4 at Souther Field Georgia 1918

The 5th Reconnaissance Squadron's origins unofficially begin before the United States entry into World War I. In December 1916 the squadron was first organized as an un-designated unit at Rockwell Field, California, it being the fifth Aero Squadron authorized by the Aviation Section, U.S. Signal Corps. After flight training, the squadron was formally organized on 5 May 1917 at Kelly Field, Texas where it performed flight training duties. It was transferred to the new Souther Field, Americus, Georgia in April 1918 where it joined the 116th, 236th and 237th Aero Squadrons as Curtiss JN-4D flight training squadrons. Souther Field was one of thirty-two Air Service training camps established after the United States entry into World War I in April 1917. It consisted of warehouses, barracks, fifteen hangars and other structures. Eventually over eighty JN-4s were used for training.

In July 1918, as part of a re-organization of training squadrons in the United States, it was disbanded and replaced by Squadron "A", Souther Field which continued the flight training mission.

The flying training at Souther Field continued until November 1919 when the War Department deactivated the field and sold its surplus airplanes to the public. One of the planes was sold to Charles Lindbergh who bought a JN-4 with a brand-new OX-5 engine, and an extra 20 gallon gasoline tank in May 1923.

=== Inter-war period ===
A new 5th squadron was established after World War I as part of the permanent United States Army Air Service in 1919. Authorized as the 5th Aero Squadron at Hazelhurst Field, New York, it was assigned to the 3d Observation Group. The squadron was equipped with war surplus Dayton-Wright DH-4Bs. The squadron moved to Mitchel Field, New York the following month. In 1921, the unit became the 5th Squadron (Observation) and two years later the 5th Observation Squadron.

In May 1921, the 5th was attached to General Billy Mitchell's 1st Provisional Air Brigade at Langley Field, Virginia. From May to October 1921, the squadron and other units of the Air Brigade bombed battleships off the eastern seaboard. Mitchell was determined to prove airplanes could sink warships. In July, in the well known SMS Ostfriesland incident, brigade airplanes sunk a modern, German-made battleship. General Mitchell proclaimed the era of battleships had ended and the age of airpower had begun.

On 1 August 1922, the 5th Observation Squadron joined with the 1st Observation Squadron to form the 9th Observation Group, today's 9th Operations Group and the 9th Reconnaissance Wing's predecessor. In 1928, the Army attached the 99th Observation Squadron to the 9th Observation Group and assigned the squadron to the group the following year. Throughout the 1920s and early 1930s the 5th flew routine observation and training missions and participated in air shows. Squadron pilots flew a variety of World War I-vintage aircraft, including the DH-4, O-1, O-2, A-3, B-6, and several others.

In the mid-1930s, as tensions increased in Europe, the United States began to expand its air arm. On 1 March 1935, the Army re-designated the 5th Observation Squadron as the 5th Bombardment Squadron. Soon after the re-designation, the squadron received new Martin B-10 bombers. The B-10, a small bomber best suited for coastal defense, could out-fly the best Army pursuit plane of its day. In 1938, the 5th switched to the larger Douglas B-18 Bolo.

=== World War II ===
==== Sixth Air Force ====
By November 1940 German U-boats actively patrolled waters off Central America near the Panama Canal. The Army dispatched the 9th Bomb Group to guard the canal. The 5th Bombardment Squadron deployed to Rio Hato Army Air Base, Panama with that Group on 13 November 1940, at which time it was designated as the 5th Bombardment Squadron (Medium), this being changed to (Heavy) five days later.

Two B-18A Bolos of the unit made "training flights" through Central America commencing 12 January 1941, flying from Albrook Field in the Panama Canal Zone. Their route took them first to San Jose, Costa Rica, then to San Salvador, El Salvador, Guatemala City, Managua, Nicaragua and thence back to David Field, Panama and home to Rio Hato. Major General Sanderford Jarman, Commander of the Panama Coast Artillery Command, was a VIP passenger on this flight which gave the crews excellent familiarity with airfields, flight conditions and navigational problems unique to the Caribbean.

The Squadron received a single Boeing B-17B Flying Fortress to augment its four B-18As by 25 August 1941 and, on 28 September 1941, deployed to Beane Field, St. Lucia, in the Antilles, from Rio Hato. By January 1942, unit strength at Beane Field consisted of but four B-18A's and a single B-18, where the unit was attached as an element of the Trinidad Base Command.

In May 1942, the Squadron was formally assigned to the Antilles Air Task Force/Antilles Air Command, still at Beane Field, and, in October 1942 the squadron was relieved of its mission and ordered back to the United States at Orlando Army Air Base, Florida. Its personnel and B-18s were reassigned to other units.

At Orlando AAF, the squadron was re-manned and re-equipped with B-24 Liberators was assigned to the Army Air Force School of Applied Tactics, training aircrews in advanced combat tactics. For the next sixteen months, squadron pilots developed new tactics, tested equipment, perfected glide bombing techniques, and trained crews in high-altitude precision bombing. Eventually the squadron received B-17 Flying Fortresses, B-25 Mitchells and B-26 Invaders as part of the training program.

==== B-29 Superfortress operations against Japan ====
In February 1944, the 5th was again transferred, without personnel and equipment to Dalhart Army Airfield, Texas then to McCook Army Airfield, Nebraska. At McCook Field, the 5th and its sister squadrons received new Boeing B-29 Superfortresses. Squadron crews spent the next six months training in their new airplane.

When training was completed, moved to North Field Tinian in the Mariana Islands of the Central Pacific Area in January 1945 and assigned to XXI Bomber Command, Twentieth Air Force. Its mission was the strategic bombardment of the Japanese Home Islands and the destruction of its war-making capability.

It flew "shakedown" missions against Japanese targets on Moen Island, Truk, and other points in the Carolines and Marianas. The squadron began combat missions over Japan on 25 February 1945 with a firebombing mission over Northeast Tokyo. The squadron continued to participate in wide area firebombing attack, but the first ten-day blitz resulting in the Army Air Forces running out of incendiary bombs. Until then the squadron flew conventional strategic bombing missions using high explosive bombs.

Re-equipped with incendiary bombs, the squadron returned to attack Tokyo's wooden structures that housed Japan's war industry, American bombers kept up a relentless attack on Japanese aircraft factories, chemical plants, naval bases, and airdromes throughout the final months of the war. Despite stiff opposition – heavy and light antiaircraft fire, search lights, flak boats, and fighter planes – squadron aircraft inflicted heavy damage on Nagoya, Osaka, Kobe, Tokyo, and other cities.

Conditions were so difficult on two of the missions the squadron earned Distinguished Unit Citations. First, on 15–16 April 1945, the 5th and other 9th Bomb Group units attacked the industrial area of Kawasaki, Japan. Kawasaki provided vital components for Tokyo and Yokohama's industry. Strategically located, Kawasaki's industrial area was heavily defended, both on the flanks and surrounding the target area. This made the approach, bomb run, and breakaway extremely hazardous. Adding to the danger, squadron pilots flew the 1,500 miles from Tinian to Japan low-level, over water, at night. Severe turbulence along the way affected the mechanical navigation equipment, but the bombers held their course.

Attacking according to the bombing plan, the 5th Bomb Squadron was in the last run over the target. By then the Japanese defenders were fully alerted and knew the approximate bombing altitude and direction of the attack. Exceptionally close coordination between the enemy searchlights and antiaircraft guns subjected the bombers to powerful concentrations of antiaircraft fire on their way to the target, over the target, and after their breakaway. Intense, accurate fire from flak boats on the flight to and from the target caused more damage. Approximately 56 Japanese fighters attacked the 5th and its two sister squadrons. The American strike destroyed Kawasaki's industry, but the squadrons of the 9th Bomb Group paid a heavy price. Four of the group's 33 B-29s crashed during the mission. Six other sustained heavy damage.

The squadron won a second Distinguished Unit Citation the following month. Effectively mining the Shimonoseki Straits and the waters around the harbors of northwest Honshu and Kyushu would block sea traffic on the Inland Seas and isolate important northern ports. By laying mines in the seas around Japan, the Allies hoped to isolate Japan's main islands and deprived them of resources from conquered territories in China, Manchuria, and Korea. The mines would also prevent reinforcement of Japanese-held islands.

The squadron continued attacking urban areas with incendiary raids until the end of the war in August 1945, attacking major Japanese cities, causing massive destruction of urbanized areas. It also conducted raids against strategic objectives, bombing aircraft factories, chemical plants, oil refineries, and other targets in Japan. The squadron flew its last combat missions on 14 August, when hostilities ended. Afterwards, its B-29s carried relief supplies to Allied prisoner of war camps in Japan and Manchuria.

The squadron was largely demobilized on Tinian during the fall of 1945. Remained in Western Pacific, assigned to Twentieth Air Force. Moved to Clark Field in the Philippines on 15 April 1946. It relocated to Harmon Field on Guam on 9 June 1947, by which time it was largely a paper organization with few personnel or aircraft. The squadron was inactivated on Guam on 20 October 1948.

=== Strategic Air Command ===
==== Strategic bombardment ====
Following World War II, the National Security Act of 1947 established the U.S. Air Force as a sister service of the Army and Navy. The concurrent establishment of major commands within the Air Force brought wholesale realignments, including creating new wings with subordinate groups and squadrons. The Air Force established the 9th Strategic Reconnaissance Wing on 25 April 1949 and activated it on 1 May. The Air Force also activated and redesignated the 9th Bomb Group and its subordinate squadrons, making them the 9th Reconnaissance Group, and the 1st, 5th and 99th Reconnaissance Squadrons. The 5th Reconnaissance Squadron's new home was Fairfield-Suisan (later Travis) AFB, California. For the next 11 months, squadron crewmembers flew RB-29s on visual, photographic, electronic, and weather reconnaissance missions.

On 1 April 1950, the Air Force again redesignated the 9th Wing and its subordinate squadrons. The squadron again became the 5th Bomb Squadron. In February 1951 the Air Force placed all flying squadrons directly under the wing. On 19 June 1952 the 9th Bomb Group inactivated. The 5th continued to fly B-29s from Fairfield-Suisun AFB until 1 May 1953. After the Strategic Air Command assumed jurisdiction over Mountain Home AFB, Idaho, the Air Force Moved the 9th Bomb Wing there.

The following year, B-47 "Stratojets" replaced the 5ths B-29s. For the next twelve years, the squadron served as an important element in the Strategic Air Command's nuclear deterrent force. Massive retaliation became a cornerstone of national policy and an effective deterrent to perceived threats. Crewmemebers trained and practiced incessantly to achieve and maintain the high state of readiness needed to fulfill their demanding and vital mission. They then spent alternating weeks in Alert Sites, ready to launch their bombers at a moment's notice. For its role in testing a new deputy-commander organizational concept to improve America's immediate retaliatory strike capability, the 5th received an Air Force Outstanding Unit Award in 1958. It maintained alert during the Cuban Missile Crisis in October 1962.

==== Strategic Reconnaissance ====
By 1966, however, the B-47 was obsolete, replaced by the newer, larger B-52 Stratofortress. On 25 June the 9th Bomb Wing and its subordinate units inactivated at Mountain Home AFB. Although the 9th immediately activated at Beale AFB, California as the 9th Strategic Reconnaissance Wing, only the 1st and 99th squadrons activated with it.

When the 9th Wing moved to Beale AFB in 1966, it became the parent organization for the SR-71 "Blackbird." Ten years later the U-2 "DragonLady" joined the 9th. The wing was the home for both America's high altitude, manned, reconnaissance aircraft. In 1986, the 5th activated and rejoined the 9th as the 5th Strategic Reconnaissance Training Squadron.

The squadron recruited, screened, and trained U-2 pilots to fly operational missions around the world. Because the U-2 is so unique and difficult to fly, the instructor-to-student ratio was one-to-one. For the next four years, 5th pilots taught students at Beale AFB and also flew operational missions around the world. When the Air Force removed the SR-71 from active service in 1990, however, U-2 pilot training moved to the 1st Reconnaissance Squadron and the 5th again inactivated.

=== From the 1990s in Korea ===
On 1 October 1994, the 5 RS was reactivated as a subordinate unit to the 9th Operations Group, 9th Reconnaissance Wing, at Beale Air Force Base, California. It replaced the 9th Reconnaissance Wing's Detachment 2 at Osan AB, Korea. Detachment 2, the "Blackcats," had operated from Osan AB since 1976. The 5th had a "real world" mission-flying classified reconnaissance in Korea and the Far East.

In 1995 the 5th RS was the first unit to have the new U-2S model aircraft fully operational and on 20 October 1995, Lieutenant Colonel Charles P. Wilson II flew the first ever U-2S operational mission. Additionally, in 1995 the U-2 flew the 2000th Advanced Synthetic Aperture Radar System mission. The squadron was the recipient of the 1995 Lockheed Advanced Development Corporation Hughes Trophy, distinguishing the unit as Best Reconnaissance Squadron in the 9th Reconnaissance Wing and was also nominated for the Republic of Korea Presidential Unit Citation.

Since 1976, the unit has flown more than 7,000 operational sorties, utilizing an integrated suite of all-weather Multi-spectral image sensors. The unit has maintained a 98 percent mission effectiveness rating, despite challenging weather and a long logistics trail. Significant past events include the 1976 Korean Demilitarized Zone "tree cutting" incident in which two U.S. officers lost their lives. The unit provided continuous coverage of the area during the tense period that followed. Since 1976, surge operations have been conducted many times due to heightened tensions on the Korean Peninsula. In 1987, President Chun Doo-hwan visited the detachment to honor the unit for its outstanding contribution to the security of the country. In addition to its real world mission, the unit has flown humanitarian sorties to assess ROK environmental concerns, such as flood damage, and assist the Philippines in surveying the devastation caused by the Mount Pinatubo eruption.

== Lineage ==
5th Aero Squadron

- Organized as the 5th Aero Squadron on 5 May 1917

Redesignated Squadron A, Souther Field, Georgia on 15 July 1918
Demobilized on 11 November 1918

- Reconstituted, and consolidated with the 5th Observation Squadron as the 5th Observation Squadron in April 1924

5th Reconnaissance Squadron

- Authorized as the 5th Aero Squadron on 15 August 1919

Organized 24 October 1919
Redesignated 5th Squadron (Observation) on 14 March 1921
Redesignated 5th Observation Squadron on 25 January 1923
Consolidated with Squadron A, Souther Field, Georgia in April 1924
Redesignated 5th Bombardment Squadron on 1 March 1935
Redesignated 5th Bombardment Squadron (Medium) on 6 December 1939
Redesignated 5th Bombardment Squadron (Heavy) on 20 November 1940
Redesignated 5th Bombardment Squadron, Very Heavy on 28 March 1944
Inactivated on 20 October 1948
Redesignated 5th Strategic Reconnaissance Squadron, Photographic and activated on 1 May 1949
Redesignated 5th Bombardment Squadron, Heavy on 1 April 1950
Redesignated 5th Bombardment Squadron, Medium on 2 October 1950
Discontinued and inactivated on 25 June 1966
Redesignated 5th Strategic Reconnaissance Training Squadron on 12 February 1986
Activated on 1 July 1986
Inactivated on 30 June 1990
Redesignated 5th Reconnaissance Squadron on 21 September 1994
Activated on 1 October 1994

=== Assignments ===
- Post Headquarters, Kelly Field, 5 May 1917
- Post Headquarters, Souther Field, 1 May − 30 June 1918
- 3d Observation Group (attached to Eastern Department) 24 October 1919
- Eastern Department, 24 March 1920
- Second Corps Area, 20 August 1920 (attached to 1st Provisional Air Brigade for operations, 6 May − 3 October 1921)
- 9th Observation Group, 1 August 1922
- 1st Division Air Service (later, 1st Division Air Corps, 1st Division Aviation), 30 June 1923 (attached to 9th Observation Group)
- 9th Observation Group (later 9th Bombardment Group), 15 February 1929 – 20 October 1948
- 9th Strategic Reconnaissance Group (later 9th Bombardment Group), 1 May 1949 (attached to 9th Bombardment Wing after 10 February 1951)
- 9th Bombardment Wing (later 9th Strategic Aerospace Wing), 16 June 1952 – 25 June 1966
- 9th Strategic Reconnaissance Wing, 1 July 1986 – 30 June 1990
- 9th Operations Group, 1 October 1994 – present

=== Stations ===
- Kelly Field, Texas, 5 May 1917
- Souther Field, Georgia, 1 May − 11 November 1918
- Hazelhurst Field, New York, 24 October 1919
- Mitchel Field, New York, November 1919 (operated from Langley Field, Virginia, 6 May − 26 October 1921)
- Rio Hato Airport, Panama, 13 November 1940
- Beane Field, St Lucia, c. 28 September 1941
- Orlando Army Air Base, Friday, 31 October 1942
- Pinecastle Army Air Field, Florida, 15 April 1943
- Brooksville Army Air Field, Florida, 7 January 1944
- Pinecastle Army Air Field, Florida, 13 February 1944
- Dalhart Army Air Field, Texas, c. 9 March 1944
- McCook Army Air Field, Nebraska, 19 May − 18 November 1944
- North Field (Tinian), 28 December 1944 – 6 March 1946
- Clark Field, Luzon, Philippines, 14 March 1946
- Harmon Field, Guam, 9 June 1947 – 20 October 1948
- Fairfield-Suisun Air Force Base (later Travis Air Force Base), California, 1 May 1949
- Mountain Home Air Force Base, Idaho, 1 May 1953 – 25 June 1966 (deployed at RAF Fairford, England, 23 May − 8 July 1955)
- Beale Air Force Base, California, 1 July 1986 – 30 June 1990
- Osan Air Base, South Korea, 1 October 1994 – present

=== Aircraft ===
- Curtiss JN-4 (1917–1918)
- Airco DH.4 (1919–1928)
- Douglas O-2 (1919–1928)
- Curtiss O-1 Falcon (1928–1936)
- Curtiss O-11 Falcon (1928–1936)
- Douglas O-25 (1928–1936)
- Douglas O-31 (1928–1936)
- Douglas Y1O-35 (1928–1936)
- Curtiss O-39 Falcon (1928–1936)
- Curtiss A-3 Falcon (1928–1936)
- Keystone B-6 (1928–1936)
- Fairchild C-8 (1928–1936)
- Martin B-10 (1936–1938)
- Douglas B-18 Bolo (1938–1942)
- Consolidated B-24 Liberator (1942–1943)
- North American B-25 Mitchell (1943)
- Martin B-26 Marauder (1943–1944)
- Boeing B-17 Flying Fortress (1944, 1949–1950)
- Boeing B-29 Superfortress (1944–1947, 1949–1954)
- Boeing RB-29 Superfortress (1949–1950)
- Boeing B-47 Stratojet (1954–1966)
- Lockheed U-2 Dragon Lady (1986–1990, 1994–present)
- Northrop T-38 Talon (1986–1990)

== Commanders ==
- Unknown, 1917-1920
- Maj. Henry Abbey, Jr., Dec 1920
- Capt. Ira C. Eaker, 23 Jan 1922
- 1Lt. Samuel M. Connell, 19 Sep 1923
- Capt. Harold M. McClelland, 1 Oct 1924
- 1Lt. Samuel M. Connell, 5 Sep 1925
- 1Lt. Marion L. Elliott, 21 Jul 1926
- 1Lt. Charles P. Prime, 7 Jan 1927
- Capt. Walcott P. Hayes, 22 Mar 1928
- 1Lt. Byron E. Gates, 28 Jun 1928
- Capt. Edwin J. House, 23 Aug 1929
- Capt. Ernest E. Harmon, 3 Oct 1930
- Capt. John G. Colgen, 9 Sep 1932
- Capt. Willis R. Taylor, 23 Dec 1933
- Capt. Leo F. Post, 18 Feb 1934
- Capt. Willis R. Taylor, 1 Jul 1934
- Capt. Edward W. Raley, 15 Sep 1934
- Maj. Francis B. Valentine, 18 Jul 1936
- Lt. Col. Ross F. Cole, 31 Aug 1938
- Maj. Francis B. Valentine, May 1940
- Capt. Charles F. Born, Aug 1940-Aug 41
- Maj Earl C. Trees, 28 Nov 1942
- Lt Col Rolle E. Stone Jr., 10 Feb 1943
- Lt Col Malvern H. W. Brown, 2 Jun 1944
- Maj Homer W. Morris, by 15 Mar 1946
- Capt Orien T. Clark, 13 Jul 1946
- Capt Richard O. Giles, 16 Sep 1946
- Maj Charles G. Allen, 14 Nov 1946
- Capt John R. McPherson, 16 Feb 1947
- Capt William G. Broach Jr., 13 Mar 1947
- none (unmanned), 1 Apr 1947-20 Oct 1948
- Maj John M. Clayton, 1 May 1949
- Lt Col Walter Y. Lucas, 23 Aug 1949
- Lt Col Raymond E. Holsey, 18 Sep 1951
- Lt Col Edward A. Vivian, by 2 Sep 1953
- Lt Col Charles E. Bailey, 1 Mar 1956
- Lt Col Jack D. Templin, Apr 1958
- Lt Col Henry W. Ritter, 10 Jul 1961
- Lt Col Edward T. Solomon, Mar 1963
- Lt Col Dean W. Willson, Apr 1965-25 Jun 1966
- Lt Col Charles W. Hinkle, 1 Jul 1986
- Lt Col Michael G. Danielle, 9 May 1988
- Lt Col Bruce R. Cucuel, 31 Jul 1989-30 Jun 1990
- Lt Col Scott D. Mefford, 1 Oct 1994
- Lt Col Charles P. Wilson II, 28 Jun 1995
- Lt Col John B. Feda, 8 Jul 1996
- Lt Col Peter J. Szyjka, 24 Jul 1997
- Lt Col Gregory D. Augst, 20 Jul 1998
- Lt Col William Schlecht, 19 Jul 1999
- Lt Col Gregory A. Kern, 13 Jul 2000
- Lt Col Daniel F. Baltrusaitis, 2 Jul 2001
- Lt Col Jon L. Engle, 2 Jul 2002
- Lt Col Jeffrey W. Stout, 27 Jun 2003
- Lt Col Charles D. Cunningham, 27 Jul 2004
- Lt Col John H. Long, 28 Jun 2006
- Lt Col Quinn A. Gummel, 9 Jun 2008
- Lt Col Thomas S. Spencer, 15 Apr 2010
- Lt Col Deric V. Kraxberger, 17 Jun 2011
- Lt Col Luke Lokowich, 31 May 2013

Source: Air Force Historical Research Agency (AFHRA)

== See also ==
- List of American Aero Squadrons
