= Beane Air Force Base =

Former US Air Force bases on Saint Lucia

- Vieux Fort, Saint Lucia

Site information
- Type: Military airfield
- Controlled by: United States Army Air Forces

Location
- Coordinates: 13°43′59″N 060°57′09″W

Site history
- Built: 1941
- In use: 1941–49
- Demolished: converted to Hewanorra International Airport

Beane Air Force Base
- IATA: none; ICAO: none

Summary
- Airport type: Military
- Operator: United States Army Air Forces
- Elevation AMSL: 14 ft (4.3 m)
- Coordinates: 13°43′59″N 060°57′09″W
- Interactive map of Beane Air Force Base

Beane Air Force Base was a United States Air Force base located near Vieux Fort, Saint Lucia, in the Caribbean Sea. It is now the site of Hewanorra International Airport.

The base was probably named for James Beane, a US Army Air Force World War I flying ace.

== History ==
Beane Field was used as a military airfield by the United States Army Air Forces Sixth Air Force during World War II.

Construction was completed on 15 Nov. 1942, with a mission to defend the Panama Canal.

The 5th Bombardment Squadron (9th Bombardment Group) and 59th Bombardment Squadron (25th Bombardment Group) operated B-18 Bolo bombers from the airfield from 28 Sept. 1941 - 24 Mar. 1944 flying antisubmarine patrols.

With the end of World War II, Beane Field was reduced to a skeleton staff. Its primary mission was with the Military Air Transport Service, acting as a weather reporting station and as a military airfield for transport aircraft. The airfield's control tower was closed on 14 January 1946 for a brief period, but was reopened on 23 July 1946. The airfield's primarily unit was the MATS 6th Weather Squadron (Regional), with overall command of the base being that of the 24th Composite Wing, headquartered at Ramey AFB (now Coast Guard Air Station Borinquen), Puerto Rico.

The facility was renamed Beane Air Force Base in 1948. It was closed on 28 May 1949, as a result of budgetary cutbacks, with right of re-entry retained by the United States. Agreements for the base's disposition were subsequently reached with the United Kingdom and, later, the Saint Lucia government upon that state's independence. The former USAF base was then refurbished and converted into Hewanorra International Airport. There remains a disused northeast–southwest runway, north of the main east–west runway, that was part of the military airfield. It is in poor condition.

In 1966, St. Jude's Hospital was founded in the abandoned medical facility of the base by a nun from Kansas, Mary Irma Hilger of the Sisters of the Sorrowful Mother. The hospital served the 70,000 residents of the southern end of the island until destroyed by fire in 2009.
