= 1st Provisional Air Brigade =

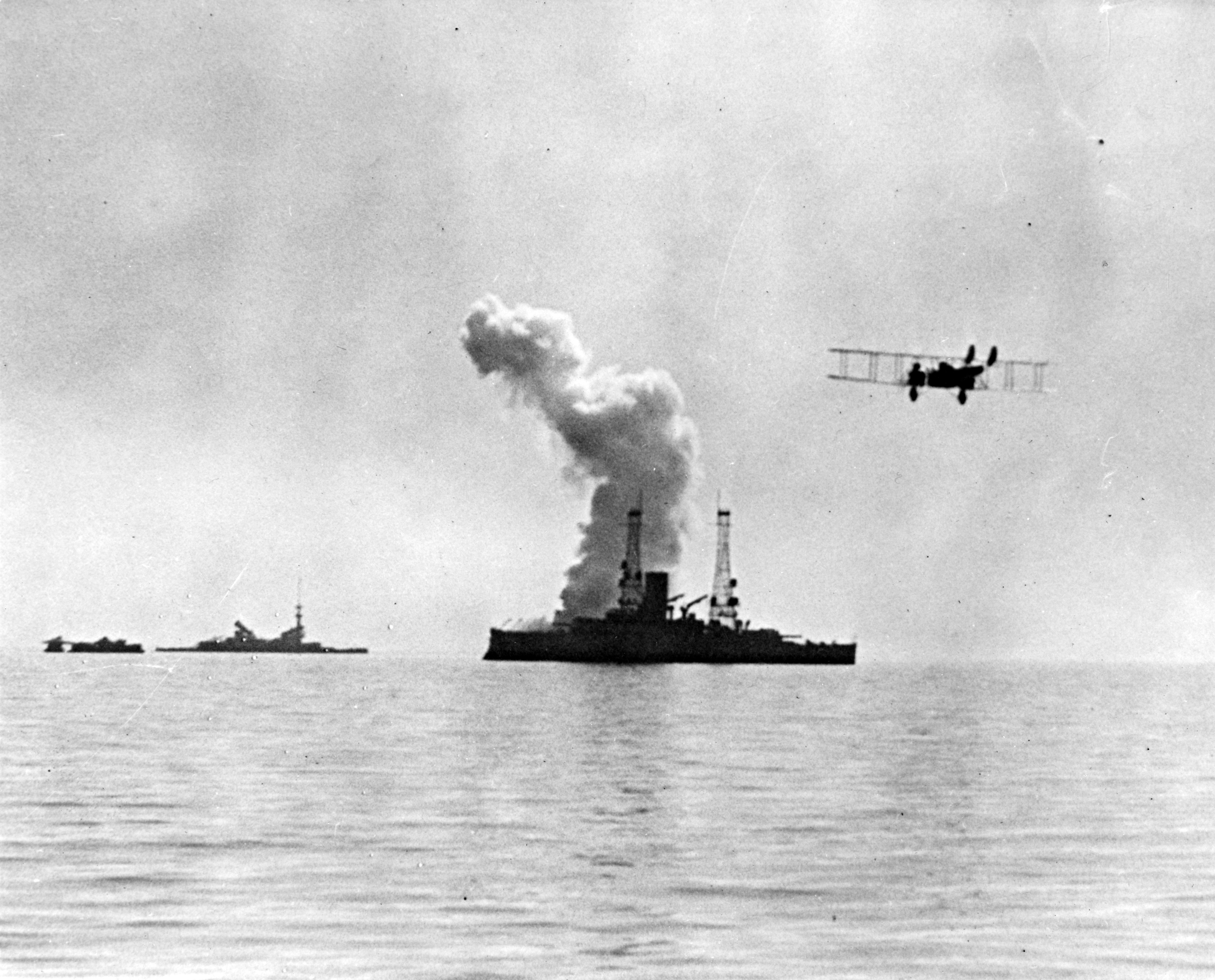
- Martin MB_1 bomber and the battleship Alabama
- Active: 1921
- Disbanded: September 1921
- Country: United States
- Branch: United States Air Force
- Type: Temporary unit
- Role: To demonstrate the vulnerability of ships to aerial attack
- Size: 125 aircraft and 1,000 men

Commanders
- Current commander: Col. Billy Mitchell

The 1st Provisional Air Brigade was a temporary unit of the United States Army Air Service, commanded by Col. Billy Mitchell, operating out of Langley Field, Virginia, that was used in Project B to demonstrate the vulnerability of ships to aerial attack when, in July 1921, the "unsinkable" German dreadnought SMS Ostfriesland was sent to the bottom of the Atlantic Ocean by bombardment. Other targets included the German destroyer SMS G-102, the SMS Frankfurt, and the USS Iowa.

== Formation ==
In the wake of the disarmament following the conclusion of the Great War, with the aviation branch of the U.S. Army drastically reduced in size, Col. Mitchell felt that the U.S. Navy's focus on building super dreadnoughts was a waste of defense money as he was convinced that warships were now vulnerable to air attack. He published articles and had testified before the House subcommittee on aviation "that 1,000 bomber aircraft could be built and operated for the cost of one dreadnought and that his airplanes could sink a battleship. He volunteered to demonstrate this if the navy would provide him with some battleships, which were already due to be demolished. The navy reluctantly agreed to the demonstrations."

"Once the test was agreed to, Mitchell formed the First Provisional Air Brigade, drawing 150 airplanes and 1,000 people from air bases around the country. Because none of the pilots knew how to sink ships, extensive training was required at Langley Field in Virginia, where practice missions against mock ships were performed. Among the officers attending the practices was Alexander de Seversky, who had served with Russia during the war, dropping bombs on German ships. He taught the pilots that the best way to sink a ship was to drop the bomb near, not on, the ship."

== Tests ==
"The test, held off the mouth of Chesapeake Bay in July, 1921 attracted widespread public interest. There, after naval aircraft in June had easily disposed of a surfaced U-boat, Mitchell's First Provisional Air Brigade, hastily assembled and trained at Langley Field, attacked and sank three German ships -- a destroyer, the cruiser Frankfurt, and the heavily compartmented Ostfriesland. Disputes arose as to the manner in which the experiment -- directed by the Navy - had been conducted, and the Joint Board's report tended to deprecate the effectiveness of aerial bombing. But the fact of the sinkings was indisputable, and Mitchell went on to clinch the validity of his claims by tests conducted with like results on obsolete US Battleships -- the Alabama in September, 1921, and the Virginia and New Jersey in September, 1923."

== Equipment ==
On 1 May 1921, Mitchell assembled the 1st Provisional Air Brigade, an air and ground crew of 125 aircraft and 1,000 men at Langley, Virginia, using six squadrons from the Air Service:

- Air Service Field Officers School, Langley Field, Virginia, (SE-5 fighters)
  - 50th Squadron (later 431st Bomb Squadron)
  - 88th Squadron (later 436th Bomb Squadron)
- 1st Day Bombardment Group (later 2nd Bomb Group), Kelly Field, Texas (SE-5 fighters, Martin NBS-1, Handley-Page O/400, and Caproni CA-5 bombers)
  - 49th Squadron
  - 96th Squadron
- 7th Observation Group (Second Corps Area), Mitchel Field, New York (DH-4 and Douglas O-2 observation planes)
  - 1st Squadron
  - 5th Squadron

Handley Page O/400 and Martin MB-2 bombers of the 96th Squadron (Bombardment) did the heavy lifting, dropping bombs of between 230 lbs (100 kg) and 2,000 lbs (910 kg) over a two-day period on the captured German warship, rupturing her water-tightness and sinking her on 21 July off of Cape Hatteras, North Carolina.

Other types drawn for the unit included Airco DH.4s and at least one Curtiss Eagle ambulance airplane.

Following the sinking of USS Alabama on 26 September 1921, the 1st Provisional Air Brigade was disbanded.

The bombing tests of 1923 were subsequently conducted with equipment and personnel of the 2d Bombardment Group.
