= 12th Reconnaissance Squadron =

US Air Force drone unit

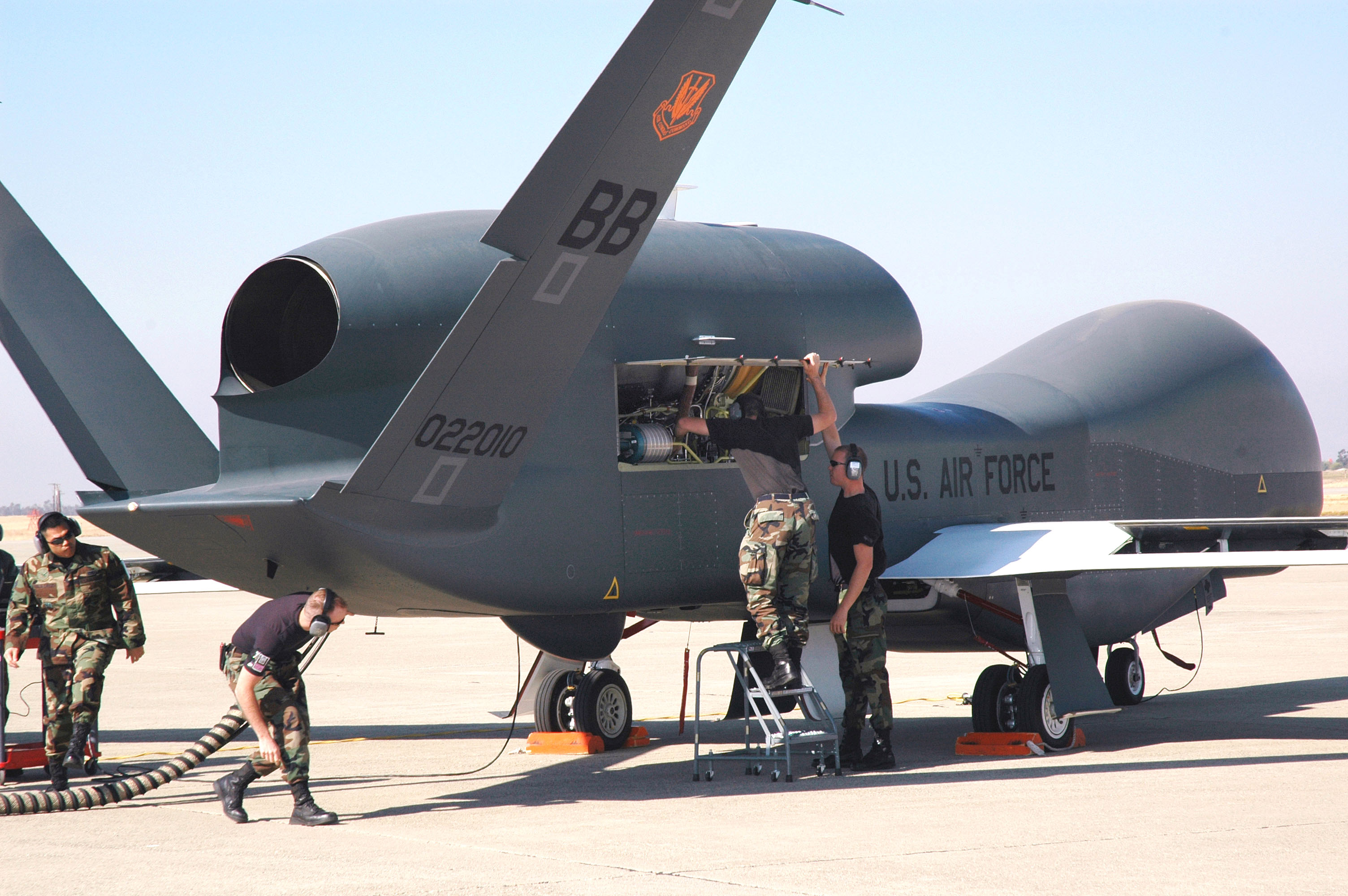
- 12th Reconnaissance Squadron RQ-4 Global Hawk
- Active: 2 June 1917 – 31 March 1946; 29 July 1946 – 28 March 1949; 25 February 1951 – 8 March 1960; 3 November 1965 – 30 September 1992; 8 November 2001 – present
- Country: United States
- Branch: United States Air Force
- Role: Aerial reconnaissance
- Size: Squadron
- Part of: Air Combat Command
- Garrison/HQ: Beale Air Force Base, California
- Motto: Know Your Enemy
- Engagements: World War I; Occupation of the Rhineland; World War II – EAME Theater; Korean Service Medal; Vietnam War; 1991 Gulf War (Defense of Saudi Arabia; Liberation of Kuwait); Afghanistan Campaign; Iraq Campaign

- Decorations: Distinguished Unit Citation; Air Force Outstanding Unit Award; Republic of Korea Presidential Unit Citation
- Battle honours: Cited in the Order of the Day, Belgian Army: 6 Jun-[c. 11 Aug] 1944

Commanders
- Notable commanders: Lewis H. Brereton; Robert Merrill Lee

Insignia
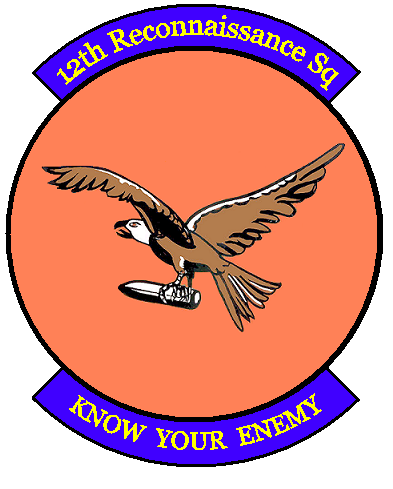
- 12th Reconnaissance Squadron emblem (approved 2 February 1924) (Note: Based on emblem approved for the 12th Aero Squadron by the American Expeditionary Forces in November 1918)

Aircraft flown
- Reconnaissance: RQ-4 Global Hawk

The 12th Reconnaissance Squadron was a United States Air Force squadron, assigned to the 319th Operations Group at Grand Forks Air Force Base, North Dakota, and operates from Beale Air Force Base, California.

The squadron traces its lineage to the United States Army Air Service 12th Aero Squadron, activated on 2 June 1917 at Kelly Field, Texas. It earned seven Campaign Streamers in World War I flying the French Salmson 2A2 aircraft as a Corps Observation squadron. The squadron again flew tactical reconnaissance missions in France and Northern Europe during World War II as part of Ninth Air Force. As a United States Air Force squadron, it flew reconnaissance missions in the Korean War, Vietnam War, Operation Desert Storm and the war on terrorism.

Aircrews of the 12th have flown over 40 different aircraft since its beginnings in 1917, fought in more than 25 major campaigns, operated from over 60 stations, and received more than 20 unit citations. Before its most recent deactivation it was equipped with the RQ-4 Global Hawk Block 30 Remotely Piloted Aircraft (RPA).

== Mission ==
The 12th Reconnaissance Squadron plans and executes worldwide high-altitude combat surveillance and reconnaissance missions including peacetime intelligence gathering, contingency operations and conventional warfare. Operating the RQ-4B Global Hawk Remotely Piloted Aircraft (RPA), the 12 RS provides signals intelligence and near real-time imagery intelligence to fulfill operational requirements generated by the Joint Chiefs of Staff in support of the Secretary of Defense and unified commanders.

== History ==
=== World War I ===
The 12th Reconnaissance Squadron is one of the oldest United States Air Force squadrons, having been involved in every armed conflict the United States has deployed forces into combat since World War I.

The 12th Aero Squadron was established in June 1917, shortly after the United States' entry into World War I. Formed at what would become Kelly Field, Texas, the squadron trained at Wilbur Wright Field, Ohio during the summer of 1917 before deploying to France in December 1917.

After a period of training in France, the 12th became an early photo-reconnaissance unit, flying over the trenches of the Western Front. Was attached to the French IV Army Corps and American I Army Corps; squadron moved frequently from one area of the front to another, usually staying at one location no more than a week or two, taking air photos and gathering intelligence. After the Armistice with Germany in November 1918, the squadron remained in France and later Germany as part of the IV Army Corps with the Rhineland Occupation forces. Returned to the United States in June 1919.

=== Inter-War era ===
see also: United States Army Border Air Patrol

Arriving at Mitchell Field, New York in June 1919, most squadron members were separated from the Air Service and returned to civilian life. A small cadre of members remained on duty, and on 8 October, Lt Alexander Pearson in a 12th Squadron De Havilland DH-4 took off from Roosevelt Field on Long Island in the first transcontinental air race, a round trip to Crissy Field, San Francisco, California, which he won with a flying time of 48 hours, 37 minutes, and 16 seconds, or an average speed of 111.3 mph.

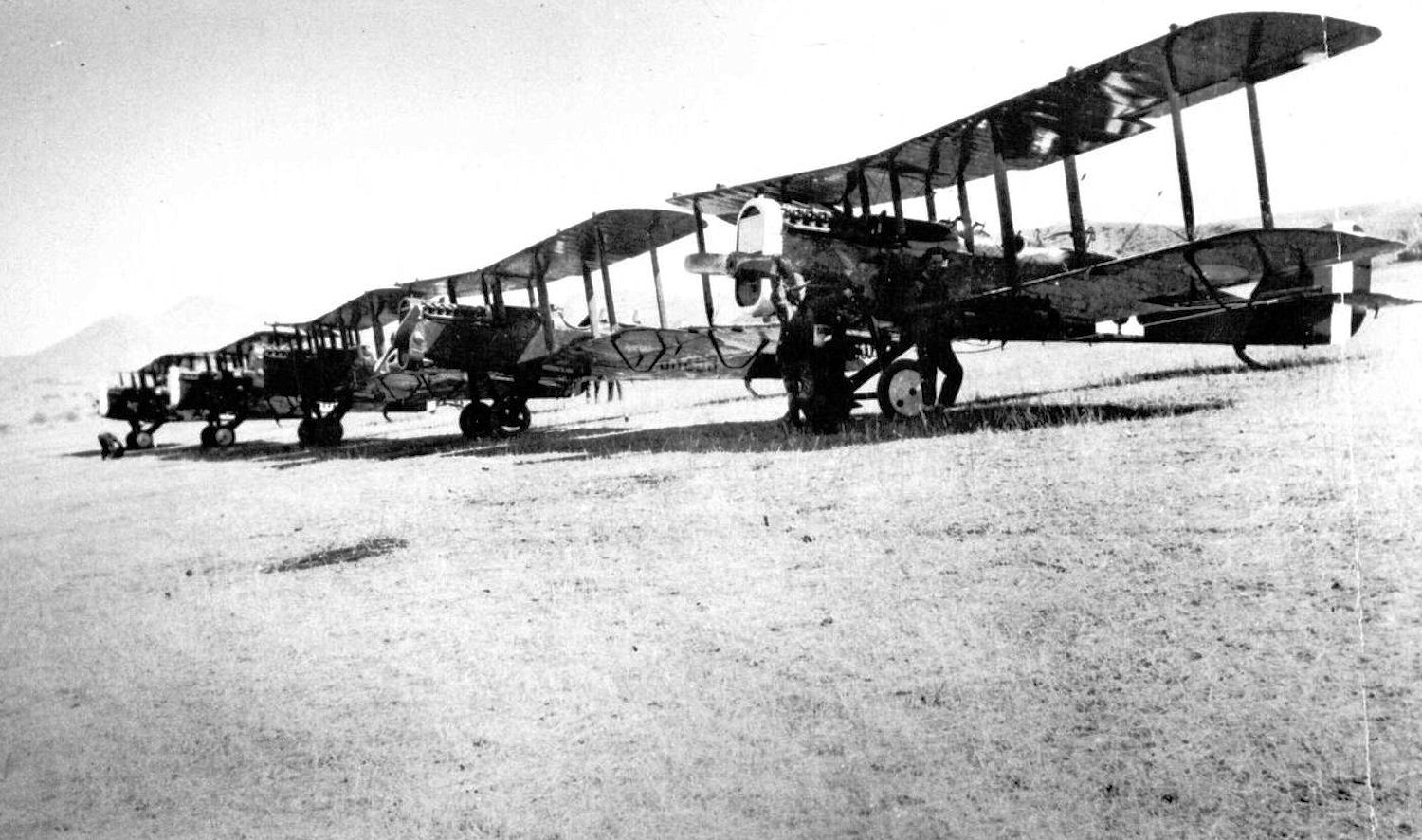
12th Aero Squadron at Camp Little near Nogales, Arizona on Mexican Border patrol duty, 1920

After a brief attachment to Scott Field, Illinois, the 12th was transferred back to Kelly Field, where it immediately began preparations for service along the Mexican Border. By February 1920, the squadron (less A Flight, which was detached to Douglas Field, Arizona) was settling in at Biggs Field, near El Paso, equipped with De Havilland DH-4s. Later that month, a terse telegram described one incident of this service: Lts G. L. Usher and L. M. Wolfe, "lost direction on patrol. Made forced landing near Nacozari Sonora Mexico. Plane reported broken. Commanding General Southern Department making arrangements for officers release from Mexico." Wolfe and Usher, on a flight from Columbus Airfield New Mexico to Nogales, Arizona on 2 February 1920, lost their way due to a bad compass and poor visibility, mistakenly following a railway some 80 miles (130 km) into Mexico. In landing near the village of La Noira, 15 miles (24 km) south of Nacozari, a wing was damaged. They were detained by Mexican authorities, although they were given the freedom of Nacozari and spent most of their time at the club of an American copper company. They were finally released on 24 February. Between 4–11 April, the 12th moved to Nogales, where it operated for nearly a year until it joined the detached flight at Douglas Field, Arizona. On 28 September the squadron, reduced in numbers, returned to Biggs Field.

In February 1921, the same Lt Pearson and the 12th were again involved in a record-setting attempt, this time a planned transcontinental flight with only two stops to be completed in less than 24 hours. The flight was to be from Pablo Beach, Florida (near Jacksonville), to Rockwell Field, San Diego, with en route servicing at Fort Worth and Biggs Field. Lt Pearson left Douglas for Florida on 7 February, but he was forced down in the desert with a broken crankshaft. Repairs were made the next day on the scene, and he flew on Biggs Field on the 9th, departing the next day for Kelly Field, San Antonio, but he didn't make it. For the next six days, aircraft from five Texas bases searched for him in vain. Then, on the 16th, he arrived at Sanderson Border Patrol station on horseback, having made his way across country from his crash site in Mexico.

In June, the Border Patrol operation ended, with all airfields except Biggs Field being closed and most units returning to their permanent stations. The 12th Squadron, less A Flight again, which returned to Kelly Field, which remained in El Paso as part of the 1st Cavalry Division. On 30 September 1922, the unit was re-designated as the 12th Observation Squadron and in September 1923, it participated in maneuvers with the division at Marfa, Texas. It was during this period, from 1922 to 1923, that Captain Claire Chennault, of later Flying Tiger fame, served with the 12th as aviation engineer officer. In June 1926, the squadron went to Charlotte, Texas, for maneuvers, and in August it moved to Bayside Beach, Texas, for gunnery and bomb practice. The 12th returned to Bayside Beach in May 1932 and April 1933 for practice in aerial gunnery.

In 1934, the 12th took part when the Army was given responsibility for flying the mail after President Franklin Roosevelt cancelled all civilian contracts because of alleged rate-fixing by the airlines. 12th pilots were assigned to the difficult and dangerous CAA Route 18, from Salt Lake City, Utah to Oakland, California, via Elko, Nevada, and Sacramento, California. The aircraft they flew were primarily Douglas Y1B-7 bombers. On 1 June 1937, the 12th Observation Squadron left Texas to operate with the 7th Cavalry Brigade, the mechanized forerunner of the First Armored Division, at Fort Knox, Kentucky. While stationed at Fort Knox, the squadron participated in field maneuvers with the mechanized cavalry near Fort Oglethorpe, Georgia, and at Fort Riley, Kansas, in 1938; in the First Army maneuvers at Plattsburgh, New York in 1939; and in the Third Army maneuvers in Louisiana in 1940. In the summer of 1940, the squadron was the first to be attached to an armored division – the First – and on 2 December, a base detachment was formed at For. Knox to manage Goodman Field, a new and modern airfield still under construction. Captain Robert M. Lee, commanding officer of the 12th, was also detachment commander. Along with the First Armored Division, the 12th Squadron played an active role in the Carolina and Louisiana Maneuvers from July to December 1941. After those maneuvers, the 12th returned to the recently completed Godman Field, where the unit supplied a cadre to organize the Headquarters Squadron of the 73d Observation Group.

=== World War II ===
After the Pearl Harbor Attack, the squadron left Godman Field on 17 March 1942 to join the 67th Observation Group at Esler Field, Louisiana. There it received extensive training in combat aircraft under Third Air Force. In late July the squadron was ordered overseas and split into a ground echelon and an air echelon. The ground echelon left Elser Field on 12 August 1942, and sailed for England on 28 August from Fort Dix, New Jersey aboard the RMS Queen Elizabeth. It arrived at Gourock, Scotland, on 6 September 1942 and proceeded to its new station at RAF Membury, Berkshire, England. Meanwhile, the air echelon had remained at Elser Field, until 21 September. On that day it left by train for Fort Dix, where it sailed aboard the Dutch Troop Ship Marnix van St. Aldegonde on 26 September, arriving at Gurock on 7 October to join the rest of the squadron at Membury.

==== Operations from England ====
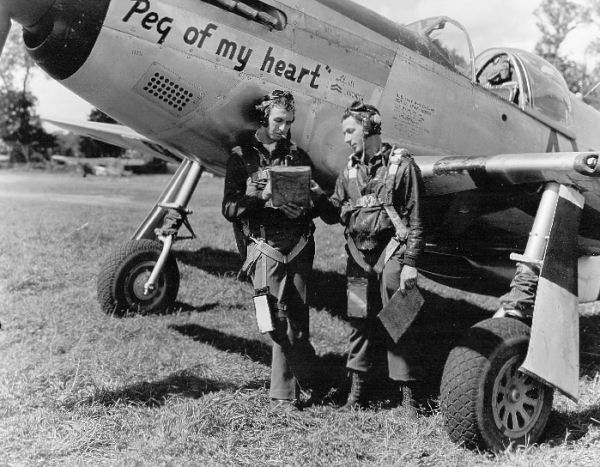
12th Tactical Reconnaissance Squadron being trained by the RAF at Membury Airfield England during World War II

In England, the squadron went through an intensive training program with the Royal Air Force. On 17 October 1942, it was assigned Spitfire PR Mk XIs, and late in January 1943, it received its first A-20 Havoc. During those months the squadron participated in several maneuvers and became a very efficient organization. On 8 July, the unit was re-designated the 12th Reconnaissance Squadron (Fighter). A little later, on 13 July, a reorganization took place and the A-20s, gunners, liaison pilots, and most of the observers of the squadron were transferred to the 153rd Liaison Squadron. The 12th was then equipped with North American P-51 Mustangs and F-6 reconnaissance Mustangs. Late in October, the 12th Squadron was transferred from the VIII Air Support Command to the IX Fighter Command. The unit became highly mobile and proficient at changing airfields on short notice. It would fly from eight English bases before moving to the Continent.

On 13 November, the squadron was re-designated again, to the 12th Tactical Reconnaissance Squadron. Although the pilots of the 12th engaged in operations against the enemy while on detached service with the Royal Air Force, it was not until 2 January 1944 that the squadron began operations as a unit when Capt James L. Rose flew its first operational mission, a weather reconnaissance over France. On 4 January, the squadron, as part of the 67th Group, was assigned to the IX Air Support Command (re-designated IX Tactical Air Command in April 1944). After its first operational mission, the 12th helped to photograph 160 miles (260 km) of French coast and two inshore strips, each 120 miles (190 km) long using the Merton Oblique camera. On 20 March, after 19 days of extremely hazardous operation, the task was completed. Eighty-three missions were flown; 18 were aborted, 14 due to weather. The maps and photographs were an important contribution to the success of Operation Overlord, the invasion of the continent of Europe. The 12th shared a Distinguished Unit Citation with the 67th Tactical Reconnaissance Group for the "most extensive low altitude oblique photographic assignment ever undertaken over enemy territory." Now the 12th TRS turned to photographing targets over Belgium and France – targets from Le Havre to Luxembourg, and from Liège to Lorient. One day it was marshalling yards in Belgium, another day bridges along the Seine River, then gun emplacements on the "Rocket Coast" plus targets in the Pas-de-Calais area. In May 1944, 66 out of 75 missions were successful.

==== Northern France Campaign ====
On 6 June 1944, D-Day, and for days afterwards, the 12th TRS performed area and route reconnaissance missions as well as artillery adjustment missions over and immediately behind the front lines. The squadron flew 250 missions during the month and operated around the clock. Reconnaissance was a major factor in allied strategy, and the 12th TRS kept higher echelons informed of enemy convoy and troop movements, and the location of troop concentrations. Effective 13 June, the 12th was transferred to the 10th Photographic Reconnaissance Group. However, about 5 July 1944, the squadron moved with the 67th Tactical Reconnaissance Group to ALG A-9 Le Molay-Littry – the first of five airfields from which it would operate in France – and began supporting the United States First Army, which was massing for a breakthrough near Saint-Lô. After the breakthrough, the 12th followed General George S. Patton's Third Army in its drive across France and supported him for the rest of the war.

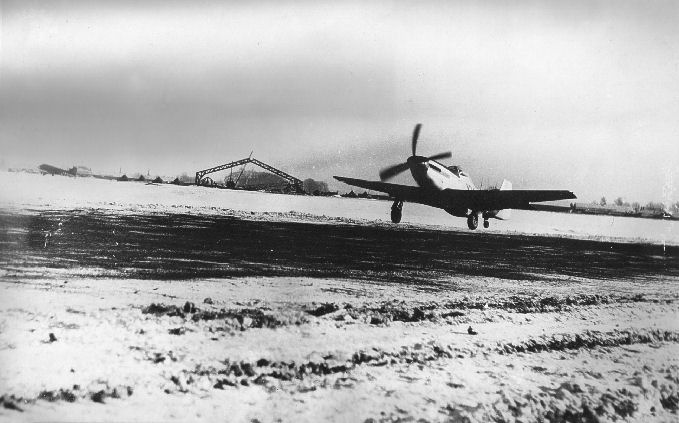
12th Tactical Reconnaissance Squadron F-6 Mustang, taking off from Conflans Airfield (Y-94), France, late 1944/early 1945

On 1 August 1944, the squadron was assigned to the XIX Tactical Air Command. Since no French airfield was ready for the 10th Group, the 12th had to handle the reconnaissance load for the first several days, flying 26 missions in five days with a 100 percent success rate. Although bad weather hampered its operations during the rest of the year, several outstanding missions were flown. On the 11th, the squadron was the first from the 10th Reconnaissance Group to move onto the newly captured Rennes Airfield (A-27). During September, in addition to its regular missions, the 12th flew 170 missions in nineteen days reconnoitering the area along and beyond the Siegfried Line where German armies were building up reserves. The pilots also spotted and photographed areas the Germans were strengthening and reconnoitered marshalling yards to see if reinforcements were being sent in from other parts of Germany. During November and December, missions were flown over the Ruhr and Rhine valleys and over such cities as Frankfurt, Mannheim, Wiesbaden, Koblenz, and Ludwigshafen, many of which were heavily defended.

During the German retreat after the Battle of the Bulge, the 12th kept its planes in the air, spotting enemy vehicles, troops, and supplies. Medium bombers had knocked out so many roads and bridges that thousands of German vehicles were trying to escape, but had no way to move. On 26 January, 12th TRS pilots spotted 4,000 vehicles and called in P-47 Thunderbolt fighter-bombers in to finish the job. The 12th Squadron was commended by Generals Carl Spaatz and Weyland for its work during the German withdrawal.

==== Invasion of Germany ====
The 12th moved to Vogelsang Airfield (Y-61), Germany on 2 March 1945. During March, 320 missions were flown in support of the Third Army's break through of the Siegfried Line. At this point, the squadron received an order stressing the fact that the 12th was a reconnaissance squadron and that engagements with the enemy should not be encouraged. Reconnaissance areas changed rapidly in keeping pace with Patton. During the first part of April, targets included Frankfurt, Darmstadt, Würzburg, and Kassel. Later they were farther east – Gotha, Erfurt, Leipzig, and Chemnitz. Then the 12th moved south to Munich, Regensburg, and Nuremberg, and it finished the month by making long flights (with wing tanks) into Austria and Czechoslovakia, reconnoitering Prague, Pilsen, Linz, and Vienna. Although hostilities in general ceased in Europe on 7 May 1945, the 12th Squadron continued to fly photographic missions in support of Allied forces in Czechoslovakia, where the fighting did not stop until 10 May.

The 12th Tactical Reconnaissance Squadron made a very impressive record during World War II. The unit's historian reported that 2,732 missions were flown, 26 enemy planes destroyed, three probably destroyed, and ten damaged. The 12th Squadron lost nine planes. After the war, the 12th became part of the occupation air force in Europe. It remained at Fürth Airfield, Germany, assigned to the 10th Reconnaissance Group of the XII Tactical Air Command. The squadron demobilized during late 1945 and early 1946, being reduced to an administrative unit. On 12 February 1946 it moved to Bolling Field, Washington DC where it was inactivated on 31 March 1946.

=== United States Air Force ===
==== Postwar Era ====
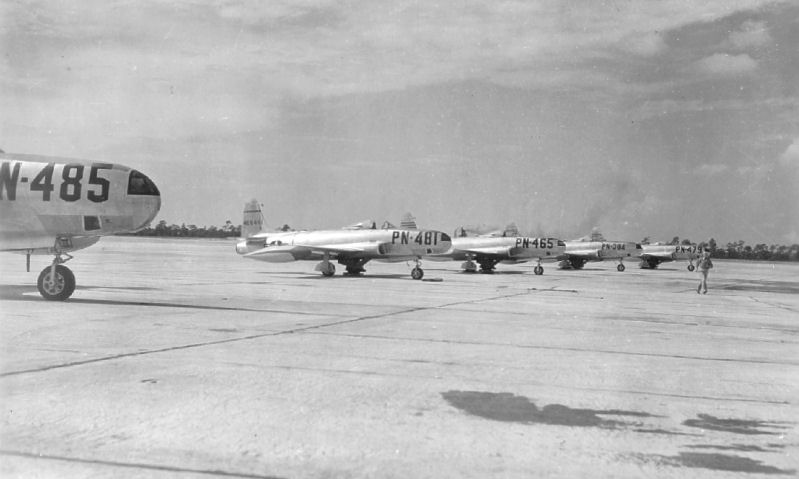
12th Reconnaissance Squadron RF-80Cs, March AFB, California, 1948. (Note: Identified aircraft are RF-80C 49-485, 481, 465, 394, 479)

The squadron was reactivated at March Field, California on 31 August 1946 as the 12th Reconnaissance Squadron, Photo (Jet Propelled). It was assigned to the 363d Reconnaissance Group, Ninth Air Force. However, because the rest of the group was stationed at Brooks Field, Texas, and later at Langley Field, Virginia, it was attached to Twelfth Air Force. The squadron, receiving FP-80 Shooting Star aircraft, claimed to be the first unit in the Air Force to use jet-photo equipment. Extensive aerial photography was performed by the 12th, including maps and layouts for the United States Department of Agriculture, the Army Corps of Engineers, and many other agencies. On 24 July 1947, the 12th was reassigned once again to the 67th Reconnaissance Group, and in the months that followed, the 12th participated in many exercises and maneuvers. The squadron filled many requests for aerial photographs. Many layouts of dams and waterways were made for the Army Corps of Engineers, Army Mapping Service, and the Department of Agriculture's Soil Conservation Service

==== Korean War ====
On 5 February 1951, the unit was re-designated the 12th Tactical Reconnaissance Squadron, Night Photo. On 25 February, eight months after the Korean War started, it was activated at Komaki Air Base, Japan, and assigned to the 67th Group once more. The 67th was part of the 67th Tactical Reconnaissance Wing, which had been formed in a reorganization of reconnaissance assets in Fifth Air Force. Personnel and equipment (RB-26s) came from the inactivated 162d Tactical Reconnaissance Squadron which returned to the United States. On 15 March 1951, the unit moved to Taegu Air Base (K-2), South Korea, where the operations section had been located since the first part of the month. The primary mission of the squadron during the Korean War was to provide the night reconnaissance capability for the wing, both photographic and visual. During hours of darkness, the 12th Squadron was tasked to collect information on enemy activities, to make visual searches and perform route reconnaissance, to perform targeting, and bomb damage assessments, to determine the accuracy of SHORAN coordinates. In emergencies, the 12th was expected to assist the two-day visual and photo recon squadrons.

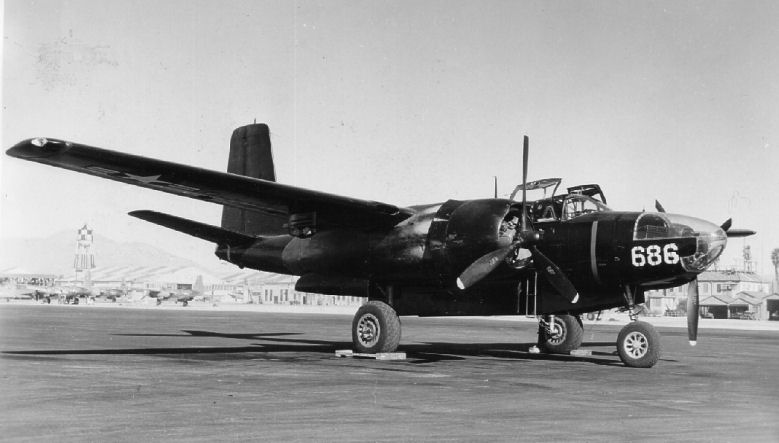
12th Tactical Reconnaissance Squadron, Night Photographic RB-26 Invader Kimpo AB (K-14), South Korea. (Note: Serial 44-35686. Photographed probably at Komaki AB, Japan)

In March 1951, the squadron's first month in South Korea, the 12th flew a total of 256 effective sorties. One of its early tasks was to provide photographs of all enemy airfields in North Korea. It also flew sorties in conjunction with the preparation and execution of a parachute drop on 23 March. On 21 August, the squadron moved to Kimpo Air Base (K-14) at Seoul and remained there for the remainder of the war. The equipment complement of the 12th Squadron necessarily influenced its performance of mission. The squadron was authorized 27 RB-26 Invaders for night reconnaissance missions, but it seldom possessed so many planes and several of the authorized aircraft were EB-26s modified for electronic reconnaissance. In the summer of 1953, the RB-26s covered the three main supply routes of the enemy each night: one route on each coast and one in the center of the peninsula. Special night photo missions were also flown against pre-briefed targets at which some particular enemy activity, was suspected on occasions the night photo planes photographed targets that for some reason could not be covered during daylight.

During the period 1 January to 30 June 1953, the unit's pilots flew 1,117 missions and sighted 88,795 enemy vehicles. In July, the last months of the war, the 12th flew 334 missions, including several daylight runs. Aerial reconnaissance seems to have been of even greater importance in the Korean fighting than in any previous war. According to a survey made shortly after hostilities ceased, air reconnaissance accounted for a considerable part of all intelligence used by ground units and for a high percentage used by the United Nations air forces.

==== Service in Japan ====
Following the end of the Korean War, the 12th TRS continued to operate from Kimpo until 8 November 1954, when it moved to Itami Air Base, Japan. The 12th maintained at least one RB-26 and crew on temporary duty at Kimpo until 28 July 1956 to provide the U.S. Army and the Republic of Korea Army with photo reconnaissance of South Korea and the demilitarized zone.

On 14 August 1956, the squadron moved from Itami to Yokota Air Base, which could accommodate the twin jet Douglas RB-66B Destroyers with which the 12th was soon to be equipped. The 12th was the first squadron in Pacific Air Forces to receive the RB-66B. On 22 December the first of the 12th's new planes arrived. In April 1958, two of the 12th's aircraft deployed to Bangkok, Thailand, to fly reconnaissance missions for a Southeast Asia Treaty Organization (SEATO) exercise, and in the following June its RB-66s took part in a joint Navy-Air Force exercise, providing navigational aid and escort for F-100Ds attacking the naval task force.

During January 1960, crews of the 12th ferried their planes to the United States, refueling from tankers over Wake Island and Hawaii. Not long after, on 8 March, the squadron was inactivated at Yokota.

==== Vietnam War ====
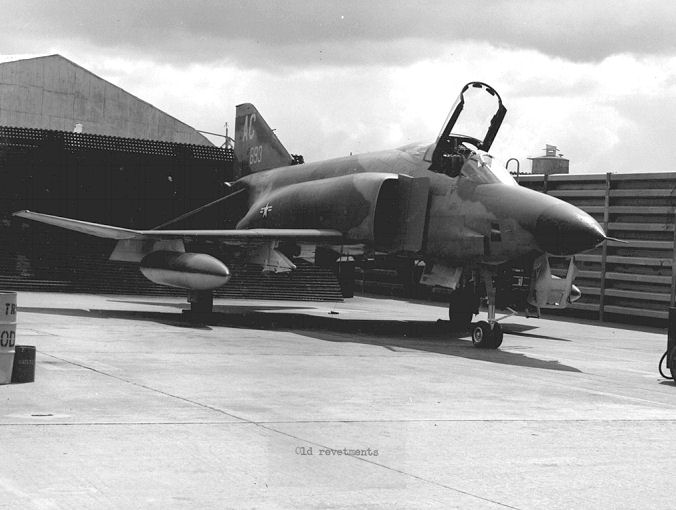
12th Tactical Reconnaissance Squadron McDonnell RF-4C Phantom Tan Son Nhut Air Base, South Vietnam, 1968 (Note: McDonnell RF-4C-26-MC Phantom 65-0893)

On 3 November 1965, the outfit was redesignated the 12th Tactical Reconnaissance Squadron (Photographic) and assigned to Tactical Air Command. It was reactivated at Mountain Home Air Force Base, Idaho on 1 July 1966, and organized there about 8 July, assigned again (temporarily) to the 67th Wing. At this time the unit was equipped with McDonnell RF-4C Phantom II reconnaissance aircraft. On 2 September of that year, the unit deployed to Tan Son Nhut Air Base, Republic of Vietnam, where it became a part of the 460th Tactical Reconnaissance Wing on 9 September.

In the first four full months of operation in Southeast Asia, crews of the 12th TRS flew 2,014 combat sorties against pinpoint, strip, and area cover targets in North Vietnam, South Vietnam, and Laos. Approximately two-thirds of these were flown at night. Continuous information on enemy supply movements, troop concentrations, and fortifications was obtained from aerial photography taken by the 12th. In addition, photography taken by the unit was used in bomb damage assessment, base defense planning, and enemy air defense site detection. The 12th flew more than 26,000 combat sorties and 53,000 hours over a 5-year period. This was more than in both World Wars and Korea combined.

==== Post-Vietnam ====
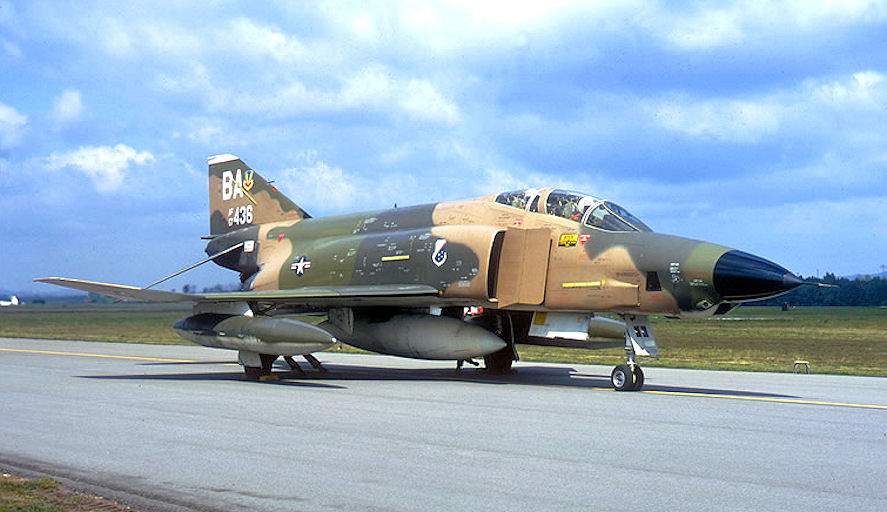
RF-4C Phantom 67-436 at Bergstrom AFB, about 1972

The 12th Tactical Reconnaissance Squadron moved to Bergstrom AFB, Texas, on 20 August 1971, where it became – once again – a component of the 67th Tactical Reconnaissance Wing. The unit made annual Salty Bee exercise deployments to USAFE bases in Europe, participated in exercises throughout North America, and was actively involved in the Peacetime Aerial Reconnaissance Program (PARPRO). Modifications to the RF-4C added the capability to designated targets for laser guided munitions. Crews and aircraft from the 12th deployed to the Middle East to take part in Operation Desert Storm in 1991. On 28 August 1992 with the retirement of the RF-4C Phantom, the 12th Tactical Reconnaissance Squadron was inactivated at Bergstrom AFB, Texas.

==== Twenty-first century ====
Reactivated at Beale Air Force Base, California in 2001 operating RQ-4 Global Hawk remotely piloted aerial reconnaissance aircraft after the September 11 terrorist attacks. In March 2013, the squadron was reassigned to the reactivated 69th Reconnaissance Group as part of the consolidation of the USAF Global Hawk mission. In June 2019 the squadron was reassigned to reactivated 319th Operations Group. The 12th Reconnaissance Squadron is inactive today after the divestment of the RQ-4 B30 aircraft.

== Lineage ==
- Organized as the 12th Aero Squadron on 2 June 1917

Redesignated 12th Aero Squadron (Corps Observation) on 3 May 1918
Redesignated 12th Aero Squadron on 17 June 1919
Redesignated 12th Squadron (Observation)' on 14 March 1921
Redesignated 12th Observation Squadron on 25 January 1923
Redesignated 12th Observation Squadron (Medium) on 13 January 1942
Redesignated 12th Observation Squadron on 4 July 1942
Redesignated 12th Reconnaissance Squadron (Fighter) on 31 May 1943
Redesignated 12th Tactical Reconnaissance Squadron on 13 November 1943
Inactivated on 31 March 1946

- Redesignated 12th Reconnaissance Squadron, Photographic (Jet Propelled) on 9 July 1946

Activated on 29 July 1946
Redesignated 12th Tactical Reconnaissance Squadron, Photographic-Jet on 14 June 1948
Inactivated on 28 March 1949

- Redesignated 12th Tactical Reconnaissance Squadron, Night Photographic on 5 February 1951

Activated on 25 February 1951
Redesignated 12th Tactical Reconnaissance Squadron, Night Photographic-Jet on 23 February 1959
Discontinued on 8 March 1960

- Redesignated 12th Tactical Reconnaissance Squadron, Photographic-Jet and activated on 3 November 1965 (not organized)

Organized on 1 July 1966
Redesignated 12th Tactical Reconnaissance Squadron on 1 October 1966
Redesignated 12th Reconnaissance Squadron on 1 November 1991
Inactivated on 30 September 1992

- Activated on 8 November 2001

=== Assignments ===
- Post Headquarters, Kelly Field, 2 June 1917
- Post Headquarters, Wilbur Wright Field, 8 July 1917
- Aviation Concentration Center, 5 October 1917

Overseas transport, SS Northland, 5–25 December 1918

- Replacement Concentration Center, American Expeditionary Forces, 1–16 January 1918
- Chief of Air Service, American Expeditionary Forces, 16 January 1918
- I Corps Observation Group, 3 May 1918
- United States Third Army, 21 November 1918
- American Expeditionary Forces, 16 April – 16 June 1919
- Post Headquarters, Mitchell Field, 17 June 1919
- Post Headquarters, Scott Field, 6 July 1919
- First Army Observation Group, 1 October 1919

Attached to 1st Surveillance Group from 13 October 1919

- 1st Surveillance Group, 24 March 1920
- Eighth Corps Area, 27 June 1921

Divisional aviation for 1st Cavalry Division, Sep 1921 – Jun 1926, and for 2d Division, Jun 1924 – c. Oct 1931
Detachment at Field Artillery School, 1 July 1927 – 1 June 1928

- 12th Observation Group, 1 October 1930
- VIII Corps Area, 1 June 1937
- V Corps Area

Attached to: 7th Cavalry Brigade (later, 1st Armored Division), 20 June 1937
Attached to: Armored Force, 2 October 1940

- 73d Observation Group, 1 September 1941
- V Air Support Command, 21 January 1942
- 67th Observation Group (later 67 Reconnaissance Group, 67 Tactical Reconnaissance Group), 29 March 1942
- 10 Photographic Group (later 10 Reconnaissance Group), 13 June 1944

Attached to 67th Tactical Reconnaissance Group to c. 11 August 1944

- Continental Air Forces (later, Strategic Air Command), 15 February – 31 March 1946
- 363d Reconnaissance Group (attached to Twelfth Air Force), 29 July 1946
- 67th Reconnaissance Group (later 67 Tactical Reconnaissance Group), 24 July 1947 – 28 March 1949
- 67th Tactical Reconnaissance Group, 25 February 1951

Attached to 67th Tactical Reconnaissance Wing, 1 June-24 Nov 1954 and 1 July – 30 September 1957

- 67th Tactical Reconnaissance Wing, 1 October 1957 – 8 March 1960
- Tactical Air Command, 3 November 1965 (not organized)
- 67th Tactical Reconnaissance Wing, 1 July 1966
- 460th Tactical Reconnaissance Wing, 9 September 1966
- 67th Tactical Reconnaissance Wing, 31 August 1971 – 30 September 1992

Under operational control of 26th Tactical Reconnaissance Wing, 5 May – 4 June 1974, 7 July – 7 August 1981, 15 May – 11 June 1984, and 27 August – 24 September 1987
Flight attached to Tactical Fighter Wing, Provisional, 35, 14 January-10 May 1991

- 9th Operations Group, 8 November 2001 – 28 February 2013
- 69th Reconnaissance Group, 1 March 2013 – 27 June 2019
- 319th Operations Group, 28 June 2019 - present

=== Stations ===
World War I

- Kelly Field, Texas, 2 June 1917
- Wilbur Wright Field, Ohio, 8 July 1917
- Aviation Concentration Center, Garden City, New York, 2 November – 3 December 1917
- Liverpool, England, 25 December 1917
- St. Maixent Replacement Barracks, France, 1 January 1918
- Chaumont Aerodrome, France, 16 January 1918
- Amanty Airdrome, France, 2 February 1918
- Ourches Aerodrome, France, 3 May 1918
- Flin Aerodrome, France, 13 June 1918
- Saints Aerodrome, France, 29 June 1918
- Francheville Aerodrome, France, c. 6 July 1918
- Ferme de Moras Aerodrome, France, 22 July 1918
- May-en-Multien Aerodrome, France, 3 August 1918
- Coincy Aerodrome, France, 10 August 1918
- Chailly-en-Brie Aerodrome, France, 12 August 1918
- Gengault Aerodrome, France, 22 August 1918
- Remicourt Aerodrome, France, 20 September 1918
- Julvecourt Airdrome, France, 3 November 1918
- Mercy-le-Haut Airdrome, France, 21 November 1918
- Trier Airfield, Germany, 6 December 1918
- Fort Alexander, Koblenz, Germany, 30 December 1918
- Colombey-les-Belles, France, 16 April 1919
- Le Mans, France, 5 May 1919
- Brest, France, 20 May – 2 June 1919

Inter-War Period

- Mitchel Field, New York, 17 June 1919
- Scott Field, Illinois, 6 July 1919
- Kelly Field, Texas, 13 October 1919
- Fort Bliss, Texas, 9 January 1920

Flight operated from Douglas Field, Arizona, from 10 January 1920

- Nogales Field, Arizona

Flight operated from Douglas Field, Arizona from 12 April 1920

- Douglas Field, Arizona

Flight operated from Nogales Field, Arizona from c. Feb 1921

- Biggs Field, Texas, 28 September 1921

Detachment at Fort Sam Houston, Texas, after 26 June 1924

- Fort Sam Houston, Texas, 22 June 1926

Detachment at Post Field, Oklahoma, 1 July 1927 – 1 June 1928
Detachment operated from Fort Huachuca, Arizona, 6 April – 10 May 1929

- Brooks Field, Texas, 31 October 1931
- Godman Field, Kentucky, 20 June 1937

Flight at Post Field, Oklahoma, 1 June 1937 – 30 November 1940

World War II

- Esler Field, Louisiana, 20 March – 12 August 1942
- RAF Membury (AAF-466), England, 7 September 1942
- RAF Greenham Common (AAF-486), England, 16 December 1943
- RAF Aldermaston (AAF-467), England, 9 January 1944
- RAF Chilbolton (AAF-404), England, 1 March 1944
- RAF Middle Wallop (AAF-449), England, 14 March 1944
- Le Molay Airfield (A-9), France, c. 5 July 1944
- Rennes Airfield (A-27), France, 11 August 1944
- Châteaudun Airfield (A-39), France, 24 August 1944
- Saint-Dizier Airfield (A-64), France, 12 September 1944
- Conflans Airfield (Y-94), France, 30 November 1944
- Trier Airfield (Y-57), Germany, 29 May 1945
- Ober Olm Airfield (Y-64), Germany, 2 April 1945
- Fürth Airfield (R-28), Germany, 28 April 1945 – 15 February 1946

United States Air Force

- Bolling Field, District of Columbia, 15 February – 31 March 1946
- March Field (later March Air Force Base), California, 29 July 1946 – 28 March 1949
- Komaki Air Base, Japan, 25 February 1951
- Taegu Air Base (K-2), South Korea, 15 March 1951
- Kimpo Air Base (K-14), South Korea, 21 August 1951
- Itami Air Base, Japan, 8 November 1954
- Yokota Air Base, Japan, 14 August 1956 – 8 March 1960
- Mountain Home Air Force Base, Idaho, 1 July – 2 September 1966
- Tan Son Nhut Airport, South Vietnam, 9 September 1966 – 31 August 1971
- Bergstrom Air Force Base, Texas, 31 August 1971 – 30 September 1992

Deployed at: Ramstein Air Base and Zweibrücken Air Base, West Germany, 5 May – 4 June 1974
Deployed at: Zweibrücken Air Base, West Germany, 7 July – 7 August 1981, 15 May – 11 June 1984, and 27 August – 24 September 1987
Flight deployed at: Sheik Isa Air Base, Bahrain, 14 January – 10 May 1991

- Beale Air Force Base, California, 8 November 2001 – 28 February 2013
- Grand Forks Air Force Base, North Dakota, 1 March 2013 – present

=== Aircraft ===
- Dorand AR-2, 1918
- Salmson 2, 1918–1919
- Airco DH.4, 1919 – c. 1926
- Douglas O-2, C. 1926–1930
- JN-6 Jenny JNS-1, Curtis O-11, during period 1919–1930
- Thomas-Morse O-19, 1930–1933, 1935
- Fokker O-27, 1933–1935
- Douglas O-43, 1935–1941
- North American O-47, 1938–1942
- Stinson YO-54, 1940–1942
- O-52 Owl and O-57 Grasshopper, 1941–1942
- O-59 Grasshopper, 1942
- Douglas O-31, O-46; Curtiss O-40 Raven; Ryan YO-51 Dragonfly during period 1935–1941
- Douglas O-38 and 0-49 during period 1941–1942
- A-20 Havoc, 1942
- P-51/F-6C Mustang, 1942
- Spitfire PR Mk XI, 1942–1944
- L-4 Grasshopper, 1942–1943
- DB-7 and A-20 Havoc, 1943
- P-51/F-6D Mustang, 1943–1946
- FP-80A Shooting Star, 1946–1949
- RB-26B Invader, 1951–1956
- RB-66B Destroyer, 1956–1960
- RF-4C Phantom II, 1966–1992
- RQ-4 Global Hawk, 2001 – present

=== Awards and decorations ===
- Distinguished Unit Citation

LeHavre and Straits of Dover, 23 – 25 February 1944
Korea, 25 February – 21 April 1951
Korea, 9 July – 27 November 1951
Korea 1 May – 27 July 1953

- Presidential Unit Citation

Southeast Asia: 9 September 1966 – 30 June 1970
1 September 1967 – 10 July 1968
1 July 1968 – 31 August 1969
1 February – 31 March 1971.

- Air Force Outstanding Unit Award with Combat "V" Device

1 December 1952 – 30 April 1953
1 August – 2 September 1966

1 September 1971 – 15 May 1973
16 May 1974 – 15 May 1976
16 December 1976 – 1 December 1978
1 June 1982 – 31 May 1983
1 June 1983 – 31 May 1984
1 January 1985 – 1 February 1986.

- Cited in the Order of the Day, Belgian Army

6 June 1944

- Republic of Korea Presidential Unit Citation

25 February 1951 – 31 March 1953

- Republic of Vietnam Gallantry Cross with Palm

6 September 1966 – 18 August 1971.

== See also ==
- List of American aero squadrons
