= 3rd Special Operations Squadron =

3rd Special Operations Squadron

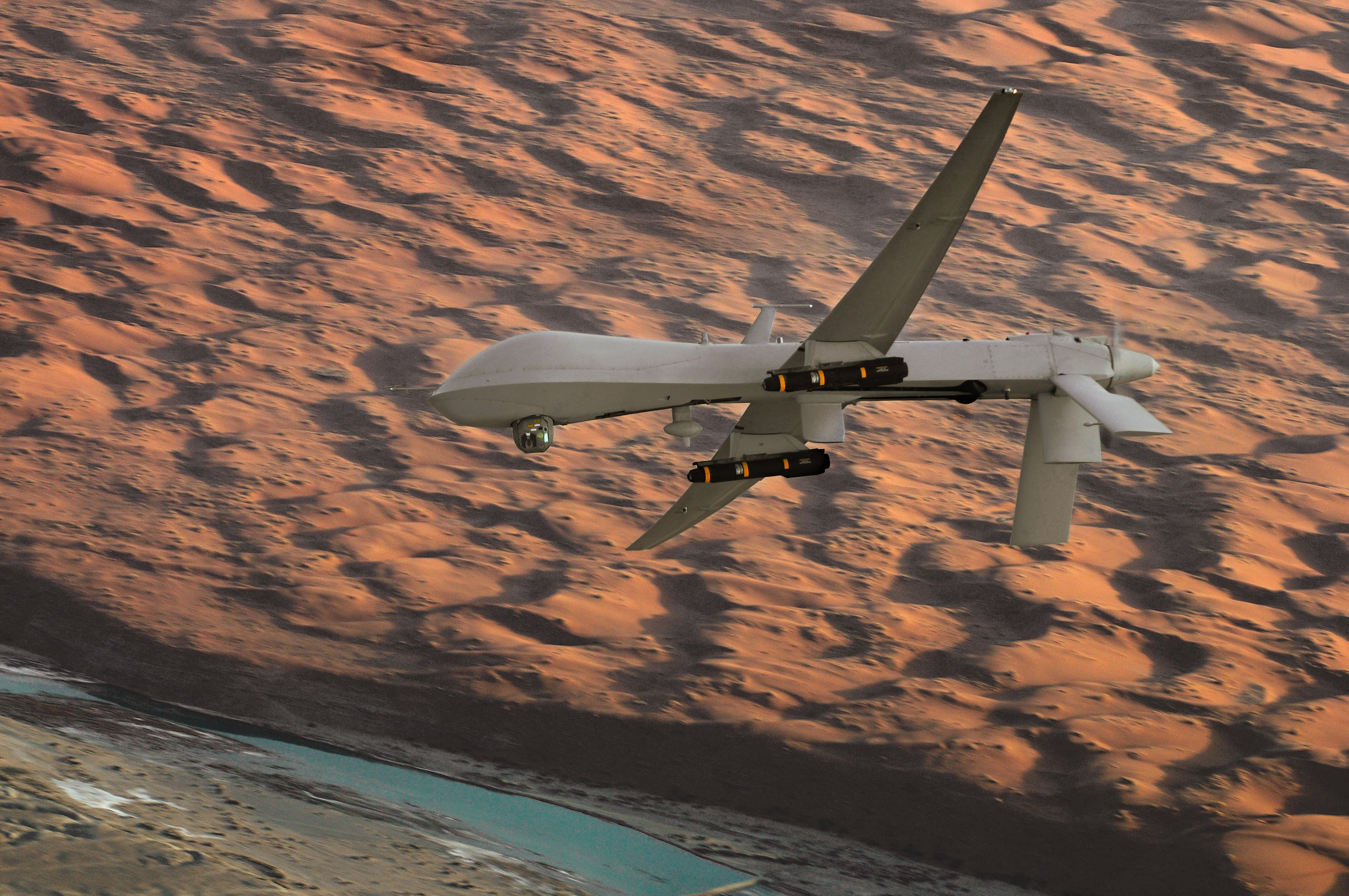
- MQ-1 Predator as previously operated by the squadron
- Active: 1918–1919; 1919–1944; 1952–1958; 1968–1969; 1976–1991; 2005–present
- Country: United States
- Branch: United States Air Force
- Role: Unmanned Special Operations
- Part of: Air Force Special Operations Command
- Garrison/HQ: Cannon Air Force Base, New Mexico
- Mottos: Pro Patria Pro Liberis (Latin for 'For Country, For Freedom')
- Engagements: World War I; World War II; Vietnam War; Global war on terrorism; War in Afghanistan; Operation Enduring Freedom; Operation Iraqi Freedom
- Decorations: Presidential Unit Citation; Air Force Outstanding Unit Award with Combat "V" Device; Air Force Meritorious Unit Award; Air Force Outstanding Unit Award; Republic of Vietnam Gallantry Cross with Palm

Insignia
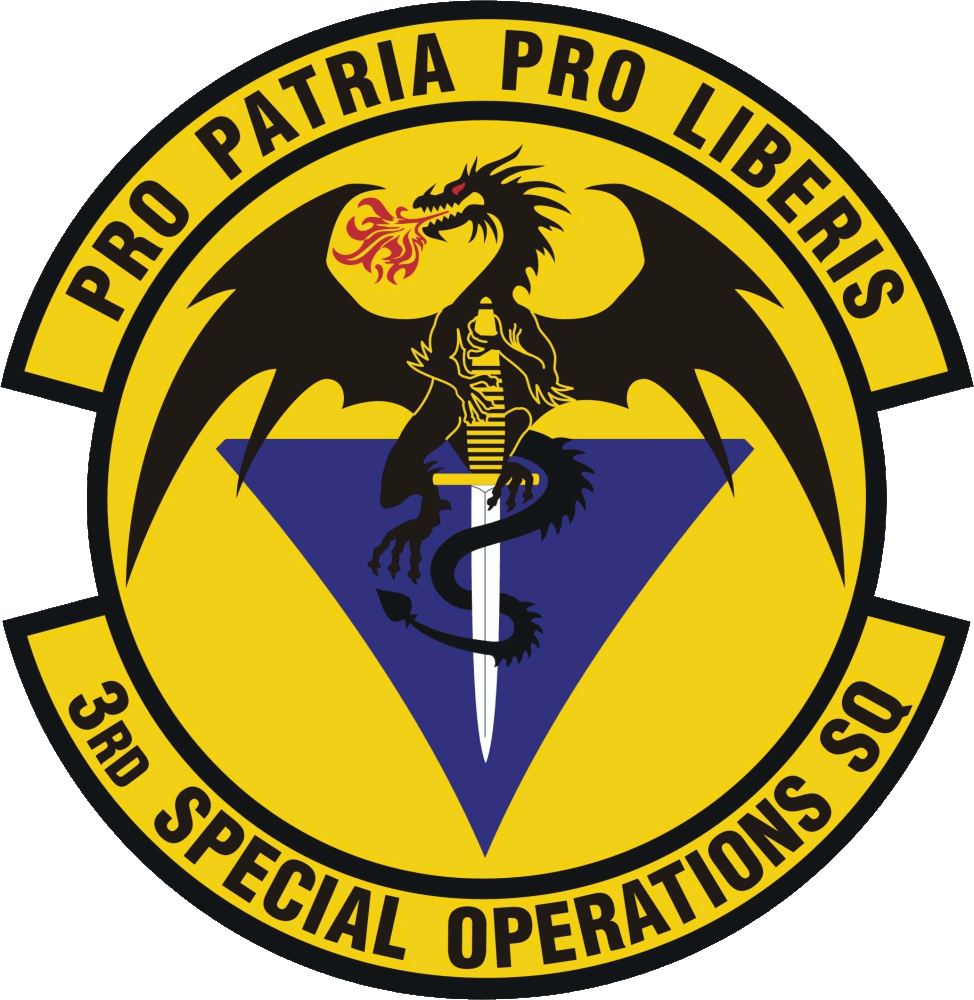
- 3rd Special Operations Squadron emblem (Note: Approved 5 May 2006.)

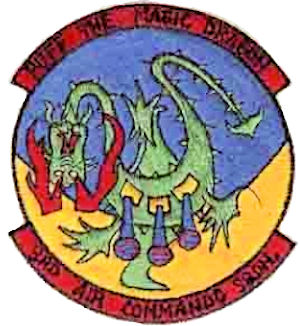
- Patch with unofficial 3rd Air Commando Squadron emblem

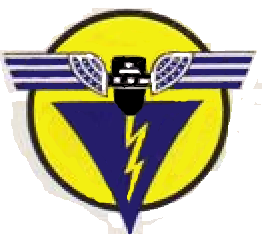
- 1st Photographic Section emblem (Note: Approved 23 July 1932.)

The 3rd Special Operations Squadron is part of the 27th Special Operations Group of the Air Force Special Operations Command at Cannon Air Force Base, New Mexico. It flies MQ-9 Reaper unmanned combat aerial vehicles or "drones"; the 3rd SOS is the first Remotely Piloted Aircraft (RPA) squadron within the AFSOC.

== Mission ==
"Executes global Special Operations taskings as a member of the Air Force component of United States Special Operations Command. Supports theater commander by providing precision weapons employment and persistent intelligence, surveillance, and reconnaissance. Plans, prepares, and executes MQ-9 Reaper aircraft missions supporting special operation forces. Organizes, trains and equips personnel."

— Cannon AFB, Face Sheet,

== History ==
=== World War I ===
Organized in France on 4 April 1918, the Photographic Section No. 1 processed aerial photographs taken by flying units working with the I Corps Observation Group and the French 38th Army Corps, 5 April–November 1918.

=== Inter-war years ===
After moving back to the United States in June 1919, the unit was demobilized in July.

In September 1919 the unit was organized as the 1st Photographic Section, assigned to the 1st Wing and then the 1st Surveillance Group, where they processed aerial photography for associated observation squadrons in Texas until becoming the 3rd Observation Squadron on June 1, 1937.

=== World War II ===
At Langley Field, Virginia, the squadron engaged in aerial observation work attached to the Coast Artillery School using Bell P-39 Airacobras until April 1942. It supported ground forces on maneuvers during 1942, and served as a training and demonstration unit January 1943 – February 1944. The squadron was not manned or equipped, 1 Mar – 2 July 1944, and was disbanded in July.

=== Strategic Reconnaissance ===
Activated again on 28 May 1952 under Strategic Air Command as part of its global reconnaissance mission and known as the 3rd Strategic Reconnaissance Squadron. The squadron did not receive its first aircraft until 1 July 1953, when it immediately began familiarization training, followed by in-flight refueling training in February 1954. It received Boeing RB-47E Stratojet aircraft in March 1954, and conducted its first long-range mission (6 planes to Alaska for 10 days) in May 1954. The squadron deployed at RAF Upper Heyford, England, 14 September – 3 November 1954. Some of these flights were mounted from Thule in Greenland and probed deep into the heart of the Soviet Union, taking a photographic and radar recording of the route attacking SAC bombers would follow to reach their targets. Flights which involved penetrating mainland Russia were termed SENSINT (Sensitive Intelligence) missions. One RB-47 even managed to fly 450 miles inland and photograph the city of Igarka in Siberia. It photographed numerous Air Force bases and American cities, 1954–1958, and participated regularly in SAC exercises. Missions flown on a reduced scale after February 1958 when events showed the vulnerability of the RB-47 to Soviet air defenses and the development of the U-2 aircraft. It slowly became non-operational between 15 April and 1 July 1958 until inactivation in July 1958.

=== Vietnam War ===
On 1 May 1968, it was organized as the 3rd Air Commando Squadron at Nha Trang Air Base, South Vietnam, absorbing resources of the 14th Air Commando Squadron. It flew combat missions in Douglas AC-47D gunships in close air support of ground forces, providing flare illumination and gunfire in support of strategic hamlets, outposts and friendly forces under night attack. From 16 February – 1 May 1969, all squadron aircraft were maintained on ground alert when not flying, due to the Tet Offensive. It began transferring its gunships to the Republic of Vietnam Air Force in June 1969 and flew its last mission on 7 August 1969.

=== Electronic warfare training ===
On 15 May 1976, it was reactivated as the 3rd Tactical Electronic Warfare Training Squadron, and was not equipped with aircraft, operating out of Camp O'Donnell, Philippines, the Pacific Air Forces Electronic Warfare Range, the Crowe Valley Aerial Gunnery Range, and associated facilities. It provided realistic conventional, tactical, and electronic warfare training in a simulated combat environment during Cope Thunder exercises. These exercises provided combat training for fighter aircrews of the U.S. Marine, U.S. Navy, and allied air forces in the western Pacific area. Following the eruption of Mt. Pinatubo in June 1991, personnel were evacuated, and the squadron remained unmanned until its inactivation, on 30 September 1991.

=== Special operations ===
On 28 October 2005, the 3rd was reactivated as the 3rd Special Operations Squadron. The initial cadre of squadron members attended training in the spring and summer of 2005. The 3rd SOS flew MQ-1B UCAVs. Despite the lack of personnel the 3rd SOS flew 23% of the total Combined Force Air Component Command MQ-1 Predator hours for the last two months of 2005.

In 2005, the 3rd SOS supported the combatant commanders in both Operation Iraqi Freedom and Enduring Freedom. They logged 650 combat sorties in Afghanistan and 4,243 sorties in Iraq. The hours totaled over 14,000 for the combined theaters.

During 2007, the 3rd SOS doubled in size and tripled its combat capabilities. The squadron became the largest MQ-1B squadron in the Air Force within 20 months of its inception.

The 3rd SOS has become the "base-line" Remotely Piloted Aircraft for the Air Force Special Operations Command.

== Lineage ==
Photographic Section No. 1

- Organized as Photographic Section No. 1 on 4 April 1918

Demobilized on 3 July 1919
Reconstituted and consolidated with the 1st Photographic Section as the 1st Photographic Section on 23 March 1924

3rd Strategic Reconnaissance Squadron

- Authorized as the 1st Photographic Section on 15 August 1919

Organized on 27 September 1919
Consolidated with Photographic Section No. 1 on 23 March 1924
Redesignated 3rd Observation Squadron on 1 June 1937
Redesignated 3rd Observation Squadron (Medium) on 13 January 1942
Redesignated 3rd Observation Squadron on 4 July 1942
Redesignated 3rd Tactical Reconnaissance Squadron on 11 August 1943
Disbanded on 2 July 1944
Reconstituted and redesignated 3rd Strategic Reconnaissance Squadron, Medium on 9 May 1952
Activated on 28 May 1952
Inactivated on 1 July 1958
Consolidated with the 3rd Special Operations Squadron and the 3rd Tactical Electronic Warfare Training Squadron as the 3rd Tactical Electronic Warfare Training Squadron on 19 September 1985

3rd Air Commando Squadron

- Constituted as the 3rd Air Commando Squadron and activated on 5 April 1968 (not organized)

Organized on 1 May 1968
Redesignated 3rd Special Operations Squadron on 1 August 1968
Inactivated on 15 September 1969
Consolidated with the 3rd Strategic Reconnaissance Squadron and the 3rd Tactical Electronic Warfare Training Squadron as the 3rd Tactical Electronic Warfare Training Squadron on 19 September 1985

3rd Special Operations Squadron

- Constituted as the 3rd Tactical Electronic Warfare Training Squadron on 13 May 1976

Activated on 15 May 1976
Consolidated with the 3rd Strategic Reconnaissance Squadron and the 3rd Special Operations Squadron on 19 September 1985
Inactivated on 30 September 1991
Redesignated 3rd Special Operations Squadron on 20 October 2005
Activated on 28 October 2005

=== Assignments ===
- I Corps Observation Group, April 1918
- First Army Observation Group, November 1918 – April 1919
- Unknown, – 3 April July 1919
- 1st Wing, 27 September 1919
- 1st Surveillance Group, c. 12 November 1919
- Eighth Corps Area, June 1922 (attached to 1st Cavalry Division)
- 2nd Division Air Service (later 2nd Division Aviation), 24 March 1923 (attached to 1st Cavalry Division until June 1926)
- Eighth Corps area, 15 February 1929 (attached to 2nd Division)
- 3rd Attack Group, 8 May 1929 (attached to 2nd Division until 1 October 1930, then to 12th Observation Group)
- 12th Observation Group, 31 October 1931
- Eighth Corps Area, 1 March 1935 (attached to 12th Observation Group until 1 June 1937)
- Third Corps Area, 20 June 1937 (attached to Coast Artillery School)
- Coast Artillery School, c. 1939
- I Air Support Command, 1 September 1941 (attached to Coast Artillery School)
- 73rd Observation Group, 12 March 1942 (attached to Coast Artillery School until 5 April 1942)
- Second Air Force, 12 August 1942 (attached to II Ground Air Support Command)
- IV Ground Air Support Command (later IV Air Support Command), 7 September 1942 (attached to II Ground Air Support Command (later II Air Support Command) until 23 September 1942)
- Army Air Forces School of Applied Tactics, 21 January 1943
- Air Support Department, AAF School of Applied Tactics (later, Tactical Air Force, AAF Tactical Center), 18 February 1943 (attached to 432nd Observation Group (later 432 Reconnaissance Group 432 Tactical Reconnaissance Group), 27 Mar – 1 November 1943)
- Tactical Air Division, AAF Tactical Center, 4 January 1944
- Orlando Fighter Wing, 20 February 1944
- AAF Tactical Center, 28 March–2 July 1944
- 26th Strategic Reconnaissance Wing, 28 May 1952 – 1 July 1958
- Pacific Air Forces, 5 April 1968 (not organized)
- 14th Air Commando Wing (later 14 Special Operations Wing), 1 May 1968 – 15 September 1969
- 3rd Tactical Fighter Wing, 15 May 1976
- 6200 Tactical Fighter Training Group, 1 January 1980 – 30 September 1991
- 16th Operations Group (later 1st Special Operations Wing), 28 October 2005 – 1 October 2007
- 27th Special Operations Group, 1 October 2007 – present

=== Stations ===
- Ourches Aerodrome, France, 4 April 1918

Detachment at Flin, France, 15–28 June 1918

- Saints Aerodrome, France, 29 June 1918

Detachment at Ourches Aerodrome, France, until c. mid-July 1918

- Francheville Aerodrome, France, 9 July 1918
- Ferme de Moras Aerodrome, France, c. 25 July 1918
- Lizy-sur-Ourcq, France, c. 4 August 1918
- Coincy Aerodrome, France, c. 10 August 1918
- Chailly-en-Brie, France, 13 August 1918
- Toul, France, 24 August 1918
- Remicourt Aerodrome, France, 19 September 1918
- Julvecourt Aerodrome, France, 3 November 1918
- Vavincourt Aerodrome, France, c. 28 November 1918
- Colombey-les-Belles Aerodrome, France, c. 5 May 1919
- Port of embarkation, France, May–June 1919
- Garden City, New York, c. 20 June – 3 July 1919
- Fort Bliss, Texas, 27 September 1919
- Kelly Field, Texas, 2 July 1921
- Fort Bliss, Texas, 24 June 1922
- Fort Sam Houston, Texas, 22 June 1926
- Brooks Field, Texas, 31 October 1931
- Langley Field, Virginia, 20 June 1937
- Desert Training Center (Camp Cooke Airfield), California, 22 April 1942
- Blythe Army Air Base, California, 30 May 1942
- Keystone Army Air Field, Florida, 21 January 1943
- Alachua Army Air Field, Florida, 3 February 1944
- Orlando Army Air Base, Florida, 6 Mar – 2 July 1944
- Lockbourne Air Force Base, Ohio, 28 May 1952 – 1 July 1958
- Nha Trang Air Base, South Vietnam, 1 May 1968 – 15 September 1969
- Camp O'Donnell, Philippines, 15 May 1976 – 30 September 1991
- Nellis Air Force Base, Nevada, 28 October 2005
- Cannon Air Force Base, New Mexico, 1 June 2008 – present

=== Aircraft ===
- Included B-10, L-2, and apparently 0–25 and 0–43 during years 1937–1942
- North American O-47, c. 1938–1942
- Stinson L-1 Vigilant, 1941–1942
- O-52 Owl, 1941–1942
- L-4 Grasshopper, 1942
- P-39 Airacobra, 1943–1944
- A-20 Havoc, 1943
- DB-7 Boston, 1943
- L-2 Grasshopper, 1943
- L-3 Grasshopper, 1943
- YRB-47 Stratojet, 1953–1954
- RB-47 Stratojet, 1954–1958
- B-47 Stratojet, 1958
- AC-47D Spooky, 1968–1969
- MQ-1B Predator, 2005 – present
- MQ-9 Reaper, 2014–present

== Notable former members ==
- John Levitow
