= 12th Aero Squadron =

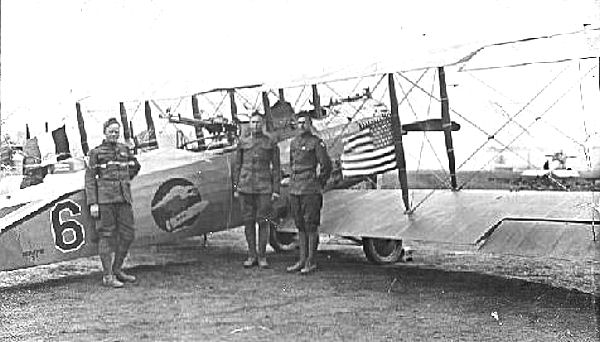
- 12th Aero Squadron – Salmson 2A2, probably at Ourches Airdrome, France
- Active: 21 June 1917 – 1 June 1921
- Country: United States
- Branch: United States Army Air Service
- Type: Squadron
- Role: Corps Observation
- Part of: American Expeditionary Forces (AEF)
- Engagements: World War I Occupation of the Rhineland

Commanders
- Notable commanders: Maj. L. C. Heffernan

Insignia
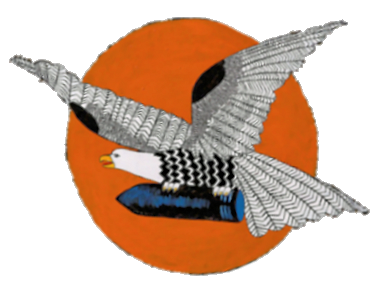
- 12th Aero Squadron Emblem

Aircraft flown
- Reconnaissance: Dorand AR-2, 1918; Salmson 2A2, 1918–1919

Service record
- Operations: I Corps Observation Group; Western Front, France: 30 April-11 November 1918: Sorties: 508; Combat missions: 186; Enemy combats: 83; Killed: 3 Pilots, 1 Observer; Wounded: 1 Pilot, 5 Observers; Missing: 1 Pilot, 2 Observers; Aircraft lost: Not Recorded
- Victories: Enemy Aircraft shot down: 3; Enemy Balloons shot down: 0; Total Enemy Aircraft Destroyed: 3

The 12th Aero Squadron was a United States Army Air Service unit that fought on the Western Front during World War I.

The squadron was assigned as a Corps Observation Squadron, performing short-range, tactical reconnaissance over the I Corps, United States First Army sector of the Western Front in France, providing battlefield intelligence. After the 1918 Armistice with Germany, the squadron was assigned to the United States Third Army as part of the Occupation of the Rhineland in Germany. It returned to the United States in June 1919 and became part of the permanent United States Army Air Service in 1921, being redesignated as the 12th Squadron (Observation).

The 12th Reconnaissance Squadron, United States Air Force, now at Grand Forks Air Force Base, North Dakota, traces its lineage and history to the 12th Aero Squadron.

== History ==
=== World War I ===
The 12th Reconnaissance Squadron originated at Kelly Field, Texas in May 1917 when the unit was organized from men picked from about 5,000 aviation recruits being drilled in provisional training companies. Those men formed "H" Company and were selected for their mechanical ability and experience. On 2 June, the unit was given its official designation, 12th Aero Squadron.

After several weeks of classes on aircraft engines and parts, the squadron went to Wilbur Wright Field at Fairfield, Ohio. Arriving on 5 July 1917, the men began assembling Standard J-1 and Curtiss JN-4 training airplanes shipped direct from the factory, and they took part in the training of the flying cadets that began pouring into the field in late July. The squadron’s first flight is supposed to have been made by a Captain Christy on 17 July 1917 in a Curtiss JN-4 "Jenny".

At the end of October, preparations for overseas movement were made. The squadron left Wright Field on 31 October, for the Aviation Concentration Center, Camp Mills, Garden City, New York, arriving at Field No. 1 on 2 November. At Garden City, the squadron remained for about a month awaiting transportation. On 5 December it boarded the SS Northland sailing from Philadelphia. After a week waiting at Halifax Nova Scotia, the trans-Atlantic crossing was made without incident, and the ship arrived at Liverpool, England on 25 December. The squadron then took a train to Southampton, and made the cross-channel crossing to Le Havre, France, arriving at a British Rest Camp the next day. After a few days, it was moved by a French train south to the large American base at St. Maixent Aerodrome on 1 January 1918.

After two weeks at St. Maixent, where the squadron largely performed guard duty and drills, orders were received to move to Chaumont-Hill 402 Aerodrome, arriving on 16 January. where its mechanics took charge of maintenance on French Nieuports and SPAD aircraft. On 2 February, the 12th finally began its combat training, being moved to Amanty Airdrome in Lorraine where it joined the 1st, 91st and 88th Aero Squadrons. At Amanty, the squadron was equipped with Avion de Reconnaissance 1 (AR 1) trainers. classes were held in radio and machine-gun work and ground training was conducted by French officers. In addition the squadron helped in airfield construction projects. The AR-1s were inferior, obsolete machines, called "Antique Rattletraps" by the pilots, which the French had retired to training duties. However, they were suitable for training and after several weeks of making do with the training provided, on 3 May orders were received to head to the front, being assigned to the I Corps Observation Group at Ourches Aerodrome, where the 12th was designated as a Corps Observation squadron.

==== Combat in France ====
At Ourches, the 12th joined the 1st Aero Squadron and began active operations over the front. It was equipped with SPAD S.XIA.2s aircraft. In combat, the mission of the 12th Aero Squadron was general surveillance of the enemy rear areas by means of both visual and photographic reconnaissance. These missions were carried out for the purpose of intelligence-gathering and informing First Army headquarters informed of enemy movements and preparations for attacks or retreats of its infantry forces. The 12th identified enemy activity along roads and railroads, ground stations, various storage dumps and airfields; the numbers of fires and activities of enemy aircraft, and the amount of anti-aircraft artillery was also monitored and reported. Due to the nature of the missions and the depths of enemy area which was penetrated, the missions were carried out at high altitudes, usually between 4,500 and 5,500 meters.

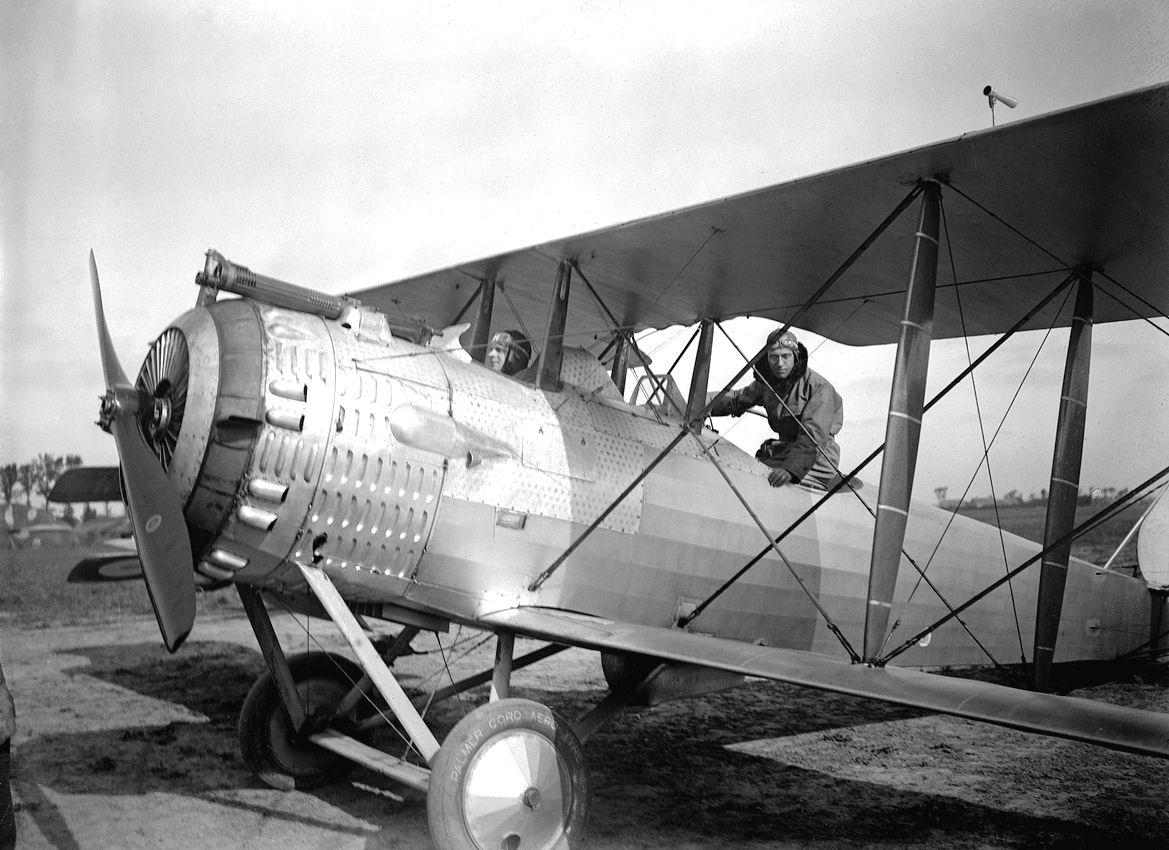
Newly received 12th Aero Squadron Salmson 2A2

With few exceptions, the 12th’s pilots had never flown combat, but most of the observers had spent a number of weeks flying with French squadrons on active missions. One of these, Lieutenant Stephen W. Thompson, was at the 1st Squadron Gunnery School at Cazaux Airdrome, near Bordeaux when he was loaned on 5 February to the 123d French Breguet Squadron due to a shortage of observers in that unit. Returning from a bombing raid on Saarbrücken, the aircraft in which Lt Thompson was operating the rear guns was attacked by German Albatross pursuit ships. He shot one down, becoming the first man in an American uniform to shoot down an enemy airplane. Later, on 28 July 1918, as a member of the 12th, he was credited with two more "kills."

The 12th’s operations in the Toul Sector was a seasoning period for the squadron as it gained experience over a relatively inactive front with almost no enemy air opposition. "On the other hand," according to an Air Service report after the war, "the enemy antiaircraft fire in the sector was exceedingly dense, active and accurate. Pilots of the Group were adept at evading antiaircraft fire after a month in the sector." On 10 June, the 12th Aero Squadron moved to the Baccarat Sector and to the unfinished Flin Aerodrome, from which they supported the 42d American and 167th French Divisions. There, the 12th began to receive the latest in French observation aircraft, the Salmson 2A2. This front, too, was considered "stabilized" or quiet, but the opposing German air force, while not flying the latest types, was active and aggressive. The 12th flew visual and photographic reconnaissance, adjusted artillery fire, and staged "infantry-contact patrols" to locate the front lines.

===== Battle of Château-Thierry =====
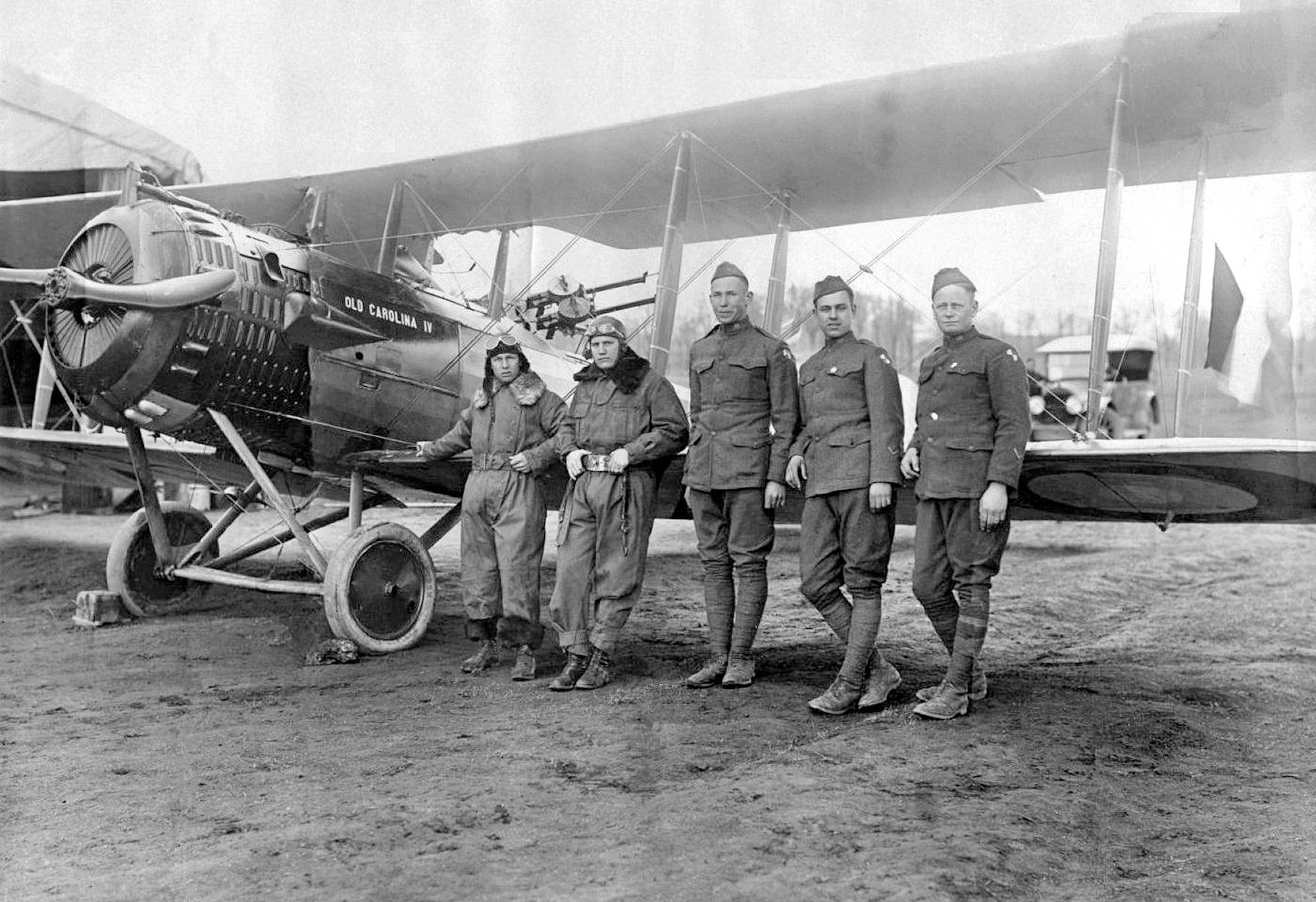
12th Aero Squadron Salmson 2A2, Julvecourt Airdrome, France, November 1918

By 29 June, the squadron had relocated to Saints Aerodrome in the Marne Sector to participate in the Battle of Château-Thierry. The 12th encountered intense opposition in the air from a concentration of German squadrons equipped with the most advanced Fokker aircraft. Encounters with up to 20 enemy aircraft on a patrol was a daily occurrence. On 5 July, the squadron moved again to a neighboring field at Francheville in support of the 26th Division, but because of its distance from the front, what would later be known as a "forward operating location," or FOL, was established at Ferme de Moras Aerodrome. Two 12th Squadron aircraft and two from the 88th Aero Squadron were flown to it at daybreak each day and held ready for developing requirements. The Allied counteroffensive was launched on 18 July and the squadron's support was vital in photographing targets ahead of the advance according to priorities set by corps intelligence. It was during this operation that oblique photography, sometimes from as low as 400 meters, began to be used; previously all photos had been vertical. The Ferme de Moras location was upgraded to a full airfield on 22 July when the squadron occupied it to participate in the Chateau-Thierry offensive, during which it lost five officers. On 28 July 1918 the Squadron had two Salmson Observation aircraft shot down near Villers Sur Fere:2/Lt AP Baker WIA/PoW and 2/Lt JC Lumsden KIA, {shot down by German ace Carl Bolle (27th victory); and Pilot John C. Miller died of wounds and Observer Lt. Stephen W. Thompson was shot in the leg.(Shot down by Lt Sergy Frommherz, (10th Victory) of Jagdstaffel 2

===== St. Mihiel offensive =====
In the first half of August, the unit moved three times, finally being withdrawn from the sector on 12 August for a brief rest at Chailly-en-Brie Aerodrome. The 12th moved to Croix de Metz Airdrome near Toul on 23 August and operated in support of the St. Mihiel offensive. During that offensive, 12–13 September, the unit was equipped with 16 additional Salmsons and flew continuously to support the rapidly advancing 5th Division. Two aircraft, one piloted by Major Lewis Brereton, commander of the I Corps Observation Group and former 12th C.O., were lost, but all four crewmembers survived after landing inside friendly lines. Immediately after the St. Mihiel salient was reduced, the squadron was assigned to support the 90th Division.

===== Meuse-Argonne offensive =====
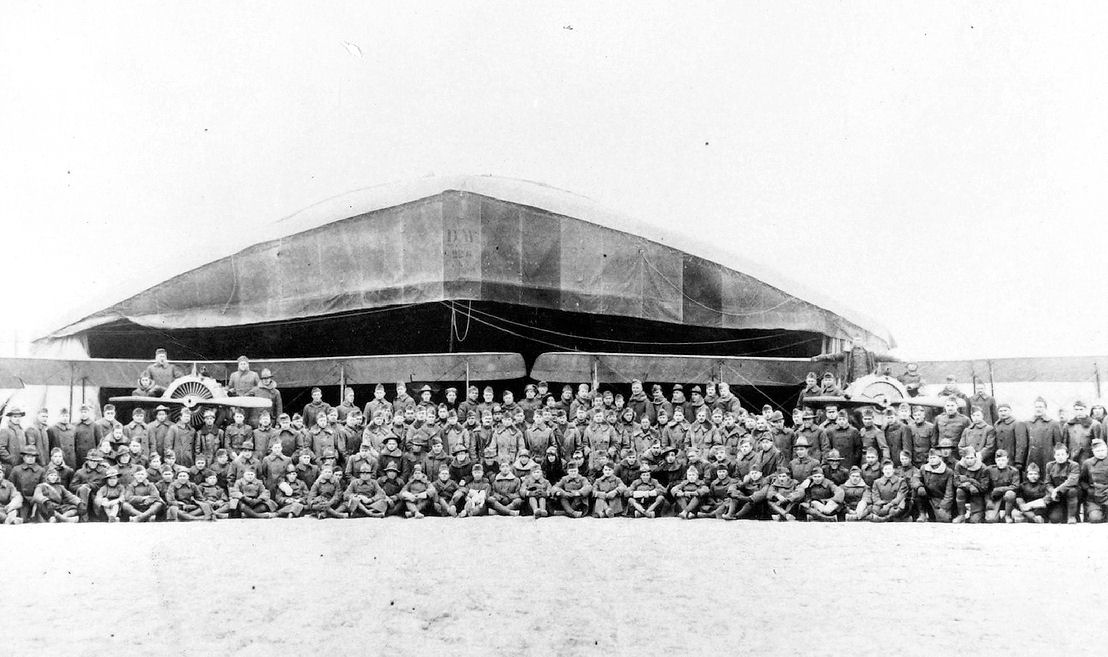
Squadron photograph, probably taken at Julvecourt in November 1918 after the armistice

On 20 September, the 12th was transferred to Remicourt Aerodrome to prepare for the Meuse-Argonne offensive which began on 26 September. During the Argonne operation the 12th Aero Squadron was very much in demand. One morning after many assignments had been made, a call came in for a photographic mission. Five planes were ordered for the flight, but only four observers were available. Eddie Foy, a radio officer, volunteered to serve as an observer for the mission. The planes encountered a large formation of Germans near the target and three were shot down, one carrying Eddie Foy, who had been wounded. It is believed that he had the distinction of being the only non-flyer in the Air Service to be wounded and taken prisoner as a result of aerial combat.

In the last few months of the war, the 12th was called in many times to help locate Allied troops that had been cut off from their units. On one such occasion during the Argonne offensive, the 82d Division reported that troops near Verpel, just east of Grand Pre were out of contact with division headquarters. Because of the foul weather and approaching darkness, Captain Steve N. Noyes, squadron commander of the 12th would not send any of his pilots on the mission, going himself instead. Flying in dense fog and rain, Captain Noyes located the troops and landed near the division HQ after dark. The information proved to be exact, and the squadron was highly commended for this as well as many other missions. The 12th completed its World War I operations from Julvecourt Aerodrome, where it moved on 5 November in order to operate closer to the front lines.

==== Third Army of occupation ====
After the signing of the Armistice on 11 November 1918, the 12th Aero Squadron became a part of the Army of Occupation. The unit was located at several different places in France and Germany until 30 December, when it went to Fort Alexander (Feste Kaiser Alexander) at Koblenz, Germany, to take part in construction work.

==== Demobilization ====
The squadron received orders from Third Army on 16 April 1919 to demobilize. It was ordered to report to the 1st Air Depot at Colombey-les-Belles Airdrome, to turn in all of its supplies and equipment and was relieved from duty with the AEF. The squadron's Salmson aircraft were delivered to the American Air Service Acceptance Park No. 1 at Orly Aerodrome to be returned to the French. There practically all of the pilots and observers were detached from the squadron.

Personnel at Colombey were subsequently assigned to the Commanding General, Services of Supply and ordered to report to the Le Mans, France, staging camp on 5 May 1919. There, personnel awaited scheduling to report to one of the Base Ports in France for transport to the United States and subsequent demobilization. Orders were received to report to the port at Brest, France, 20 May. The squadron sailed aboard the USS Liberator on 3 June, arriving at Garden City, New York, on 17 June 1919. There, most members of the squadron were demobilized and returned to civilian life.

== Lineage ==
- Organized as 12th Aero Squadron on 2 June 1917

Redesignated: 12th Aero Squadron (Corps Observation), 3 May 1918
Redesignated: 12th Aero Squadron, 17 June 1919
Redesignated: 12th Squadron (Observation) on 14 March 1921

=== Assignments ===
- Post Headquarters, Kelly Field, 2 June 1917
- Post Headquarters, Wilbur Wright Field, 8 July 1917
- Aviation Concentration Center, 5 October 1917
- Replacement Concentration Center, AEF, 1–16 January 1918
- Chief of Air Service, AEF, 16 January 1918
- I Corps Observation Group, 30 April 1918
- VII Corps Observation Group, 18 November 1918
- Commanding General, Services of Supply, 16 April – 16 June 1919
- Post Headquarters, Mitchell Field, 17 June 1919

=== Stations ===
- Kelly Field, Texas, 2 June 1917
- Wilbur Wright Field, Ohio, 8 July 1917
- Aviation Concentration Center, Garden City, New York, 2 November – 3 December 1917
- Port of Entry, Philadelphia, Pennsylvania

Overseas transport, SS Northland, 5–25 December 1918

- Liverpool, England, 25 December 1917
- St. Maixent Replacement Barracks, France, 1 January 1918
- Chaumont-Hill 402, France, 16 January 1918
- Amanty Airdrome, France, 2 February 1918
- Ourches Aerodrome, France, 3 May 1918
- Flin Aerodrome, France, 13 June 1918
- Saints Aerodrome, France, 29 June 1918
- Francheville Aerodrome, France, c. 6 July 1918
- Ferme de Moras Aerodrome, France, 22 July 1918
- May-en-Multien Aerodrome, France, 3 August 1918
- Coincy Aerodrome, France, 10 August 1918
- Chailly-en-Brie Aerodrome, France, 12 August 1918
- Croix de Metz Airdrome, France, 22 August 1918
- Remicourt Aerodrome, France, 20 September 1918
- Julvecourt Airdrome, France, 3 November 1918
- Mercy-le-Haut Airdrome, France, 21 November 1918
- Trier Airdrome, Germany, 6 December 1918
- Fort Alexander, Koblenz, Germany, 30 December 1918
- Colombey-les-Belles Airdrome, France, 16 April 1919
- Le Mans, France, 5 May 1919
- Brest, France, 20 May – 2 June 1919
- Mitchel Field, New York, 17 June 1919

=== Combat sectors and campaigns ===
Streamer	Sector/Campaign	Dates	Notes
	Toul Sector	10 May – 12 June 1918, 22 August – 11 September 1918	
	Baccarat (Luneville) Sector	13–28 June 1918	
	Aisne-Marne Sector	30 June – 14 July 1918	
	Champagne-Marne Defensive Campaign	15–18 July 1918	
	Aisne-Marne Offensive Campaign	18 July – 6 August 1918	
	Vesle Sector	7–12 August 1918	
	St. Mihiel Offensive Campaign	12–16 September 1918	
	Meuse-Argonne Offensive Campaign	26 September – 11 November 1918	

=== Notable personnel ===
- Capt. Dogan H. Arthur, DSC (2x), 3 aerial victories {WIA}
- Lt. Samuel A. Bowman, DSC
- Lt. Clinton S. Breese, DSC, SSC
- Maj. Lewis H. Brereton, DSC
- Lt. Robert L. Davidson, SSC (2x)
- Lt. Howard T. Fleeson, DSC (2x), 3 aerial victories
- Lt. Justin P. Follette, DSC
- Lt. Clifford E. Gregory, SSC
- Lt. Benjamin P. Harwood, DSC
- Capt. Elmer R. Haslett, DSC
- Lt. Kenneth H. Holden, DSC, SSC
- Lt. Leslie J. McClurg, SSC (2x)
- Capt. Stephen H. Noyes, DSC
- Lt. Edward Orr, DSC, (KIA)
- Lt. Frank Over Jr., SSC
- Lt. Maurice C. Owen, SSC
- Lt. Robert C. Paradise, DSC, SSC
- Capt. William H. Saunders, DSC, SSC, (KIFA)
- Lt. Eugene E. Stuck, SSC
- Lt. Cassius H. Styles, SSC
- Lt. Sigourney Thayer, SSC
- Lt. William C. Thomas, SSC
- Lt. Stephen W. Thompson, 3 aerial Victories, Croix de Guerre with palm (WIA)
- Lt. Burdette S. Wright, DSC, SSC

DSC: Distinguished Service Cross; SSC: Silver Star Citation; KIA: Killed in Action KIFA: [Killed in Flying Accident]

== See also ==
- Organization of the Air Service of the American Expeditionary Force
- List of American aero squadrons
