= Flin Aerodrome =

Temporary airfield in France during World War I

- Part of American Expeditionary Forces (AEF)
- Located near: Lunéville, France

Site information
- Type: Combat Airfield
- Controlled by: Air Service, United States Army
- Condition: Agricultural area

Location
- Coordinates: 48°29′54″N 006°39′20″E; Approximate Location

Site history
- In use: 1918–1919
- Battles/wars: World War I

Garrison information
- Garrison: I Corps Observation Group; United States First Army Air Service

Flin Aerodrome, was a temporary World War I airfield in France, used by the Air Service, United States Army. It was located near Lunéville, in the Meurthe-et-Moselle department in north-eastern France.

== Overview ==
During the first week of June the 12th Aero Squadron received notice that orders would shortly issue for its movement overland to Vathiménil, in the Baccarat sector, to the southeast of Lunéville. Accordingly, an advance party of several officers and a considerable detachment of men were sent forward to prepare Flin airdrome and buildings for the arrival of the squadron.

The fact that the location assigned for the airdrome contained little else than some newly erected hangars necessitated a great amount of labor by this advance party in the preparation of the landing field, offices, and quarters for both enlisted and commissioned personnel. A construction squadron had not been available for thm work; the utilization of squadron officers and men in the advance party and in addition the necessity for utilizing a large proportion of the squadron in this work after its arrival interfered with active operations for a period of four days.

However, the tactical situation in that sector at the time was not such that this delay could result seriously, the observation work during this time being carried out by the French squadron which the 12th was to relieve. On the other hand, much benefit was derived by the squadron in its earnest and strenuous endeavors to complete the airdrome installation necessary to the conduct of active operations over the front; a unit spirit of teamwork was developed which proved invaluable in the months to come.

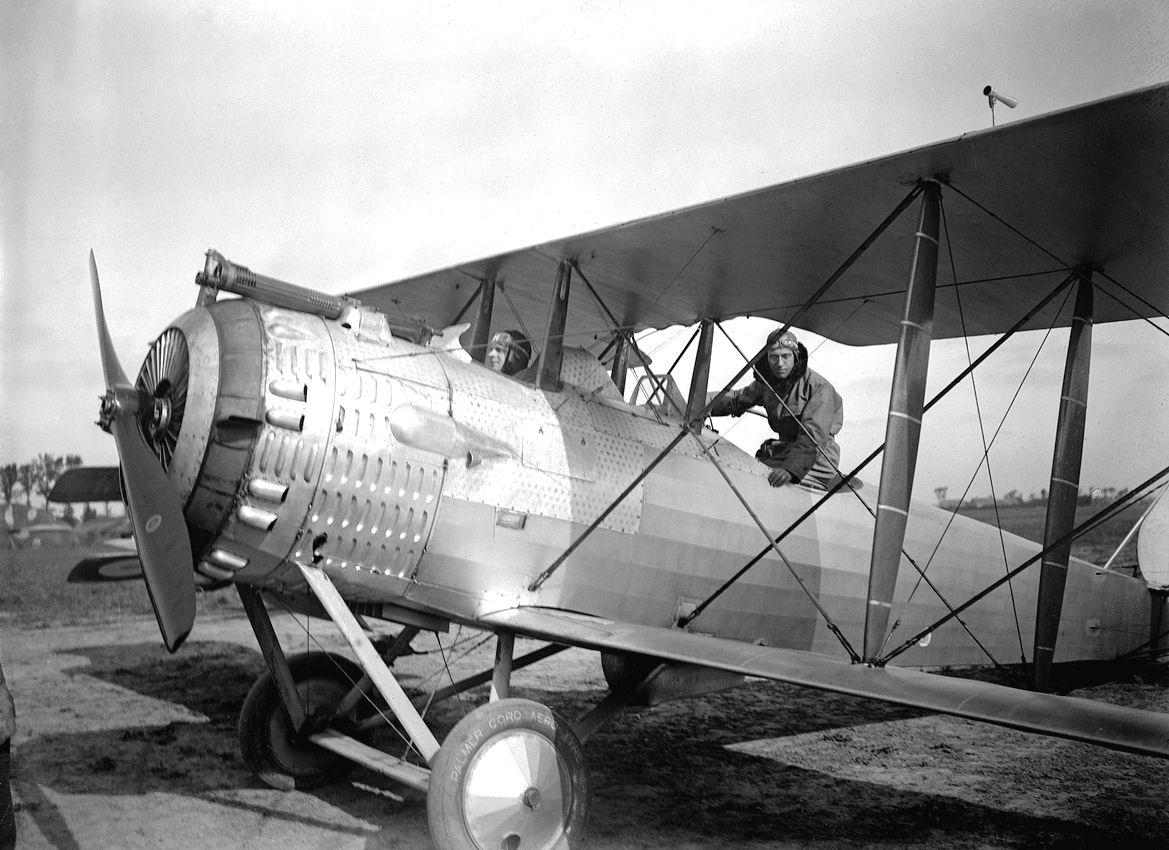
12th Aero Squadron Salmson 2A2

During its first week in this sector, the squadron gave up its equipment of AR-2 airplanes and received 18 Salmson 2A2 two seater observation airplanes. This airplane proved most satisfactory in every respect; no observation airplane used upon the western front up to the conclusion of the armistice gave greater all-around satisfaction.

== Tactical situation ==
The Baccarat sector was a typical “stabilized” or “quiet” sector. The enemy was strongly entrenched in positions which had been in existence for many months. Barbed-wire entanglements and machine-gun strong points reinforced the lines of trench work. To the rear he was supported by the usual complement of field and heavy artillery.

In the air his forces were considerably more numerous than was the case in the Toul sector. A rather active observation service was supplemented by a pursuit force which carried out daily patrols of the sector. The latter, although not equipped with the latest types of enemy pursuit airplanes, was active and aggressive. Bombardment squadrons operated on practically all clear nights against various posts of command in the sector, allied airdromes, and the towns and villages adjoining the lines. Farther to the rear the enemy had a considerable amount of pursuit aviation which devoted its energies to the attack of allied day bombardment squadrons which were then carrying out long-distance raids into Germany throughout that area.

The sector of the 42d Division, United States Army, to which the 12th Squadron was assigned, extended approximately from Badenviller to Blamont, some 12 kilometers. As in the Toul sector, the positions of the infantry were strongly organized by means of trench systems, barbed-wire entanglements, and machine-gun emplacements. The infantry was reinforced by the divisional artillery which consisted of two regiments of field and one regiment of heavy artillery. The division operated under the command of the 6th Corps of the 8th French Army. The command of all aviation forces in the Baccarat sector operating for the 6th Corps, 8th French Army, was vested in the “commandant of the sector aeronautique,” whose headquarters were located at Luneville. This officer corresponds to the present corps chief of Air Service in the American Air Service.

In addition to the 12th Aero Squadron, the aviation forces of the sector consisted for the most part of observation squadrons operating in conjunction with the divisions to the right and left of the 42d Division, United States Army. These squadrons carried out observation work for their divisions of the same nature as that to be performed for the 42d Division, United States Army. In addition, there operated one observation squadron which did the work of the Army corps. There was no regularly assigned pursuit aviation patrolling that section of the front. As a consequence the observation airplanes there operating had to rely solely upon their own armament as a means of defense against hostile aircraft.

== Operations ==
For the most part, the missions performed were confined to those of artillery adjustment and visual and photographic reconnaissance. On only one occasion were infantry contact patrols attempted. That occurred during a raid the enemy carried out against the American troops at the time of the relief of the 42d Division by the 77th Division, United States Army.' The raid took place during the night, and on the following morning the 12th Aero Squadron was requested to locate the friendly front line. In attempting to carry out the request, the caused by antiaircraft artillery fire. The second observer, when the infantry failed repeatedly to respond to his signals calling upon them to mark out the first line by means of panels or Bengal flares, flew so low that he was able to distinguish the uniforms of such men as exposed themselves to view, and was thus able to give a rough idea as to the position of the friendly infantry. Unfortunately, he was wounded by machine-gun fire from the ground before he had fully satisfied himself as to the location of our first-line troops. The third airplane dispatched encountered no better fortune than the first two in receiving a response from the infantry, but he was finally able to report briefly upon the position of the latter by means of observations made at extremely low altitude.

For the most part, aside from the visual reconnaissance missions performed at dawn and twilight of each day, and a certain number of photographic missions requested by the division and the commandant of the secteur aeronautique, practically all of the work undertaken was that solicited by the squadron commander and the observers. It being realized that the plan of operations in this sector was one of training, every effort was made to arrange and perform as many adjustments of artillery as were possible. The only limitation placed upon this type of work was that which resulted from a shortage of artillery ammunition, the artillery regiments being allotted only a fixed amount for their per diem allowance.

During the three weeks operations by the 12th Aero Squadron in the Baccarat sector much valuable advice and aid were given by the corps observation air service commander-the commandant secteur aeronautique, 6th Corps, 8th French Army-and by the experienced observer whom he placed at the disposal of the squadron commander. As the result from hostile pursuit forces during the time at Flin, considerable experience was gained by some three or four tours of pilots and observers of the squadron in aerial combat.

At the end of June, the Americans left Flin Airfield for Saints Aerodrome and was re-equipped with Salmson 2A2 reconnaissance aircraft and began flying over the more active Toul Sector. Flin was turned over to the French and its history afterwards is undetermined.

After the armistice, the airfield was returned to agricultural use. Today it is likely a series of cultivated fields, its location undetermined.

== Known units assigned ==
- Headquarters, I Corps Observation Group, 13–29 June 1918
- 12th Aero Squadron (Observation) 13–29 June 1918

== See also ==
- List of Air Service American Expeditionary Force aerodromes in France
