= 3d Reconnaissance Squadron =

3d Reconnaissance Squadron may refer to:

- The 6th Tactical Missile Squadron, designated the 3d Reconnaissance Squadron (Medium) from January 1940 to April 1942
- The 53d Weather Reconnaissance Squadron, designated the 3d Reconnaissance Squadron, Weather, Heavy from January 1945 to June 1945
- The 3d Space Operations Squadron, designated the 3d Reconnaissance Squadron, Very Long Range (Photographic-RCM) and 3d Reconnaissance Squadron, Very Long Range, Photographic from September 1945 to March 1947

== See also ==
- 3d Strategic Reconnaissance Squadron
- 3d Tactical Reconnaissance Squadron
- 3d Weather Reconnaissance Squadron
