= 12th Observation Group =

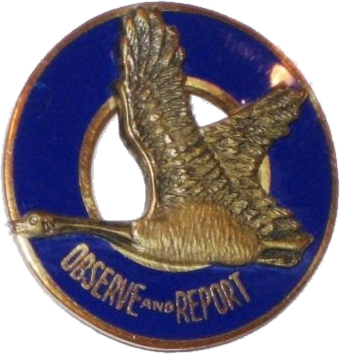
- 12th Observation Group Distinctive Unit Insigne
- Active: 1 Oct 1930 – 30 Jun 1937
- Country: United States
- Branch: United States Air Force
- Type: group
- Role: Reconnaissance
- Part of: Eighth Corps Area

The 12th Reconnaissance Group is a disbanded United States Army unit. It was last active as the 12th Observation Group, United States Army Air Corps, assigned to the Eighth Corps Area at Brooks Field, Texas. It was inactivated on 30 June 1937.

The group's origins date to the 62d Aero Squadron, which was organized as a construction squadron at Kelly Field, Texas in August 1917. The squadron was transferred to the Aviation General Supply Depot, Camp Morrison, Virginia, in Oct 1917; redesignated the 474th Aero Squadron, Feb 1918; and dispatched to France with the American Expeditionary Force Jan 1918 – Jun 1919. Its duties consisted of constructing temporary airfields for the First Army Air Service. It was demobilized in July 1919, Mitchell Field, New York

The 12th Group (Composite) was then constituted in 1923, but did not take physical form until 1 October 1930 as the 12th Observation Group. The 12th Obs Group commanded O-1, O-2 and O-19 observation squadrons in the Western United States. In 1936 its headquarters was combined with its support squadron, the 62d Service Squadron. Prior to its activation, these squadrons has been assigned to various Army ground units. Upon its inactivation, its personnel were transferred to the 82d Observation Squadron.

== Lineage ==
- Constituted as the 12th Group (Composite) 6 February 1923

Redesignated 12th Observation Group in 1924

- Activated on 1 October 1930

Consolidated with the 62d Service Squadron on 1 September 1936
Consolidated with the 62d Aero Squadron on 1 December 1936

- Inactivated on 1 June 1937

Redesignated 12th Reconnaissance Group on 1 January 1938 (remained inactive)

- Disbanded on 15 June 1983

=== Assignments ===
- IV Corps Air Service: 6 February 1923 (in inactive status)
- Fourth Corps Area: 19 June 1927 (remained inactive)
- Eighth Corps Area: 14 January 1929 (remained inactive)
- Ninth Corps Area: 14 January 1929 (remained inactive)
- Eighth Corps Area: 1 October 1930 – 1 June 1937

=== Stations ===
- Langley Field, Virginia (designated mobilization station): 6 February 1923
- Carlstrom Field, Florida (designated mobilization station): 1928
- Maxwell Field, Alabama (designated mobilization station): 1930
- Dodd Field: Texas, 1 October 1930
- Brooks Field, Texas: 1 October 1931 – 20 June 1937

=== Components ===
- 3d Observation Squadron, 31 October 1931 – 1 March 1935 (attached 1 October 1930 – 31 October 1931 and 1 March 1935 – 1 June 1937)
- 10th Observation Squadron, 6 February 1923 – 1 October 1930 (inactive)
- 12th Observation Squadron, 1 October 1930 – 1 June 1937
- 16th Observation Squadron, 1 October 1930 – 15 March 1931 (attached to United States Army Cavalry School)
- 22d Observation Squadron, 30 June 1931 – 1 June 1937
- 58th Service Squadron, May 1929 – 1 October 1929 (inactive); 1 October 1930 – 1 June 1931
- 62d Service Squadron, 1 October 1931 – 1 September 1936 (consolidated with group headquarters)
- 88th Observation Squadron, 30 June 1931 – 1 March 1935
- 91st Observation Squadron, 1 October 1930 – 23 March 1931 (attached to Ninth Corps Area)
- 383d Service Squadron, 6 February 1923 – May 1929 (inactive)
