= Chailly-en-Brie Aerodrome =

World War I airfield in France

- Part of American Expeditionary Forces (AEF)
- Located near: Chailly-en-Brie, France
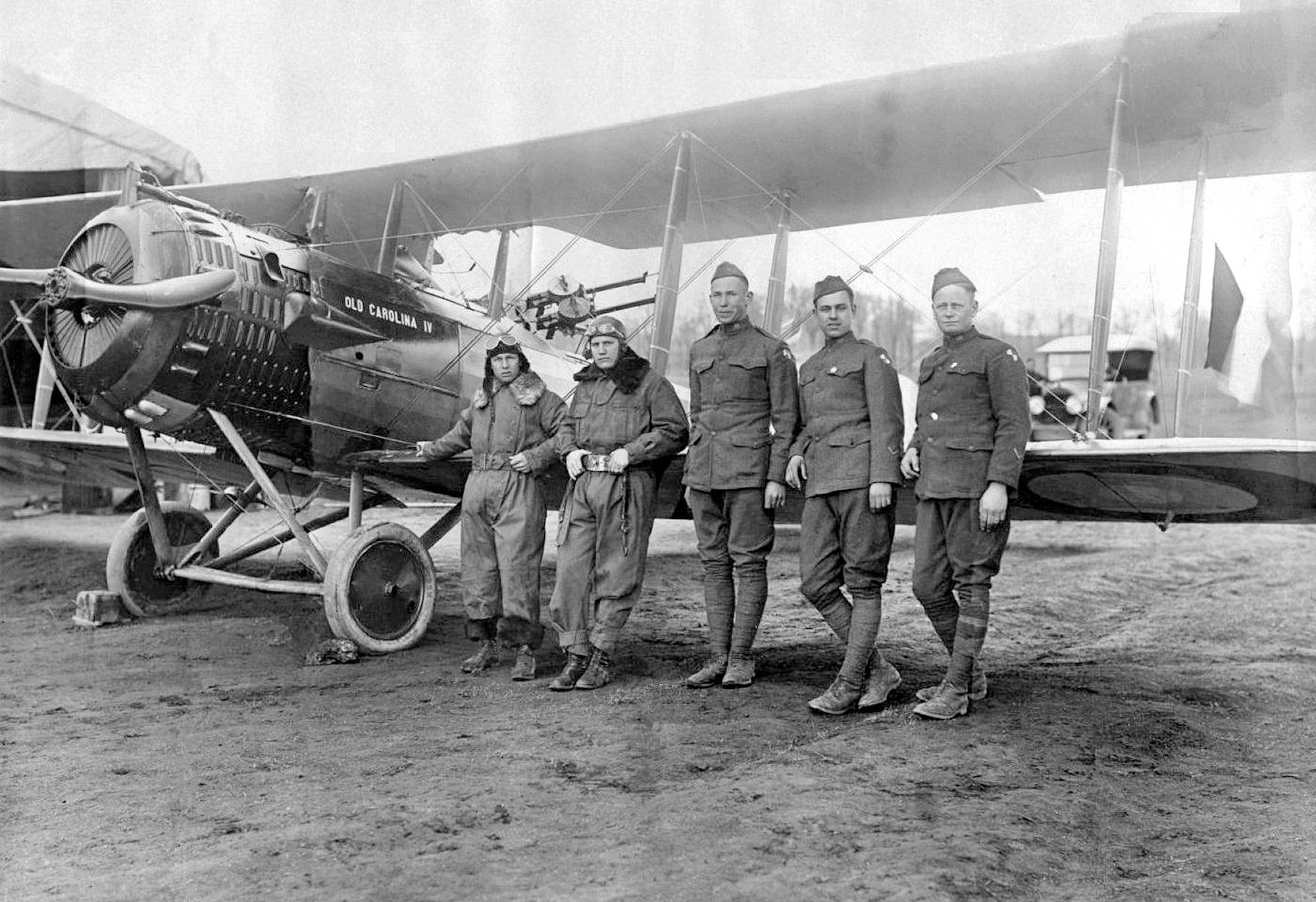
- 12th Aero Squadron Salmson 2A2, 1918

Site information
- Type: Combat Airfield
- Controlled by: Air Service, United States Army
- Condition: Agricultural area

Location
- Coordinates: 48°46′28″N 003°07′37″E

Site history
- Built: 1918
- In use: 1918–1919
- Battles/wars: World War I

Garrison information
- Garrison: I Corps Observation Group; United States First Army Air Service

Chailly-en-Brie Aerodrome was a temporary World War I airfield in France, used both by French units, and by squadrons of the Air Service, United States Army. It was located 1.3 miles (2.1 km) east of Chailly-en-Brie, in the Seine-et-Marne department in the Île-de-France region, approximately 40 miles (64 km) to the east of Paris.

== Overview ==
The airfield was a temporary facility built during the Second Battle of the Marne, likely consisting of no more than a few tents, used by both American and French units until end of August after the Allied counter-offensive liberated the area. It was used by the I Corps Observation Group as its headquarter, 12–22 August, with its two squadrons, 1st Aero Squadron and 12th Aero Squadron, operating from the airfield during the same time. The whole group then flew to Croix de Metz Aerodrome in Lorraine to prepare for the next push.

For the same reason of the battle front quickly moving towards NE, the French escadrilles stationed at Chailly left before the end of August, and the fields were soon returned to agricultural use.

The airfield was located 1.3 miles of Chailly, between the main road and the hamlet of Couture; no indications of its wartime use remain today.

== See also ==
- List of Air Service American Expeditionary Force aerodromes in France
