= Remicourt Aerodrome =

- Part of American Expeditionary Forces (AEF)
- Located near: Remicourt, France
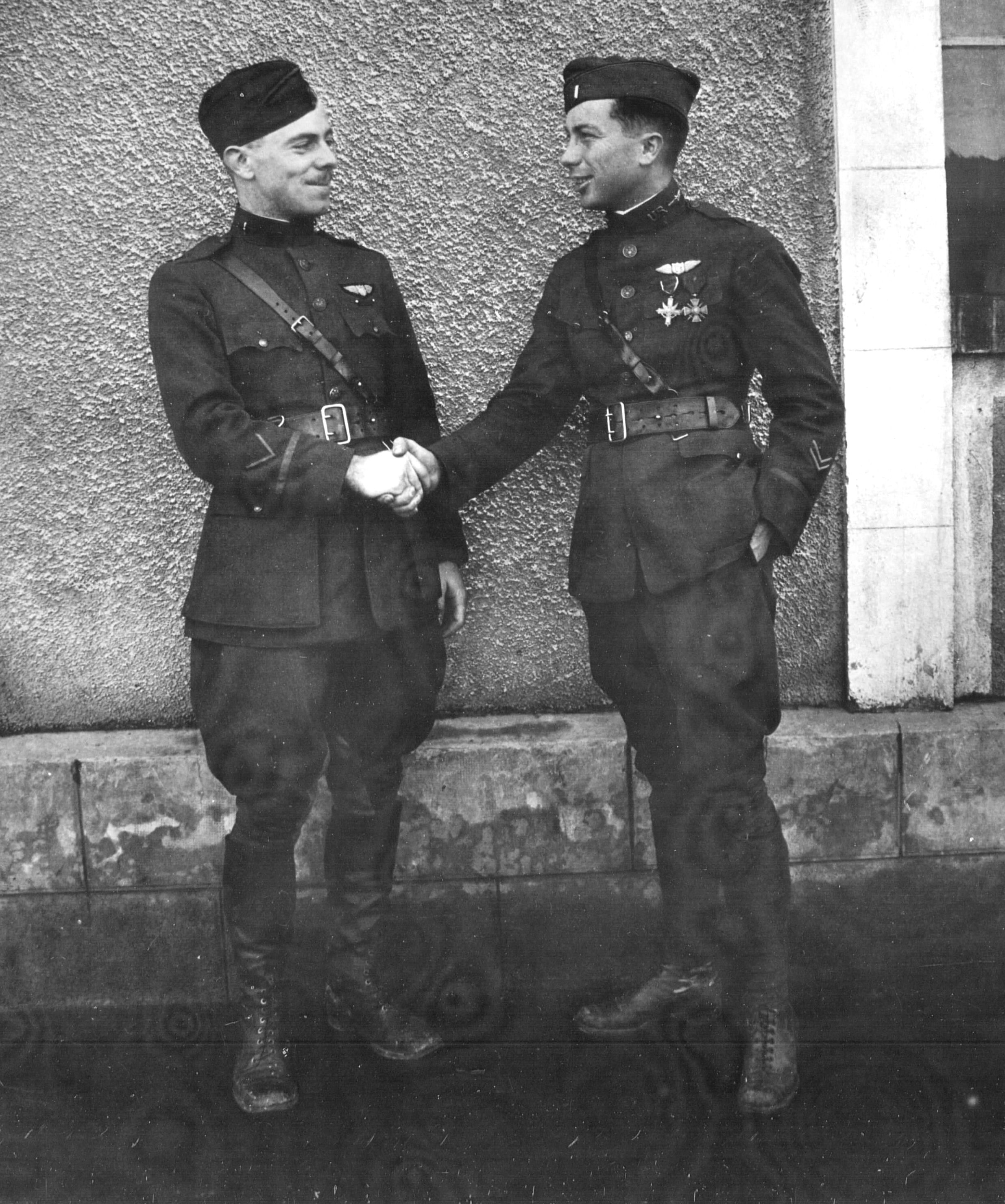
- Lieutenant William Portwood Erwin, 1st Aero Squadron, being congratulated by Captain A. J. Coyle, Commander, First Army Observation Group on achieving air ace status, October 1918

Site information
- Type: Combat Airfield
- Controlled by: Air Service, United States Army
- Condition: Agricultural area

Location
- Coordinates: 48°57′03″N 004°50′57″E

Site history
- Built: 1918
- In use: 1918–1919
- Battles/wars: World War I

Garrison information
- Garrison: I Corps Observation Group; United States First Army Air Service

Remicourt Aerodrome was a temporary World War I airfield in France, used by both the French Air Service and the Air Service, United States Army. It was located 32 miles (51 km) west-southwest of Verdun, in the Marne (department) in north-eastern France.

== Overview ==
The airfield was built during the late summer of 1918, perhaps initially for the French air service, as "Noirlieu" airfield, and used by two of its "escadrilles" in July–September. Before any American squadron flew in, the VII Corps Observation Group set up its headquarters on the airfield, where it stayed until 23 November. On 20 September 1918, I Corps Observation Group arrived at the airfield, with HQ and its three squadrons; 1st, 12th and 50th Aero Squadrons, ready to support the Meuse-Argonne Offensive with reconnaissance and battlefield observation missions in which its Salmson 2A2 aircraft were in much demand, with aerial photography, observer notes and artillery adjustments over the front. The group moved to Julvecourt Aerodrome on 5 November in order to operate closer to the fast moving front lines, towards north and east.

After VII Corps Observation Group's HQ had left, the airfield was turned over to the French Air Service and soon returned to agricultural use. Today it is a series of cultivated fields located west of Remicourt . The airfield was located to the north of the Départmental 54 (D54), with no indications of its wartime use.

== Known units assigned ==
- Headquarters, VII Corps Observation Group, 30 August – 23 November 1918
- Headquarters, I Corps Observation Group, 21 September – 5 November 1918
  - 1st Aero Squadron (Observation) 21 September – 5 November 1918
  - 12th Aero Squadron (Observation) 20 September – 3 November 1918
  - 50th Aero Squadron (Observation) 24 September – 28 October 1918

== See also ==
- List of Air Service American Expeditionary Force aerodromes in France
