= Julvécourt Aerodrome =

Temporary airfield in France

- Part of American Expeditionary Forces (AEF)
- Located near: Julvécourt, France
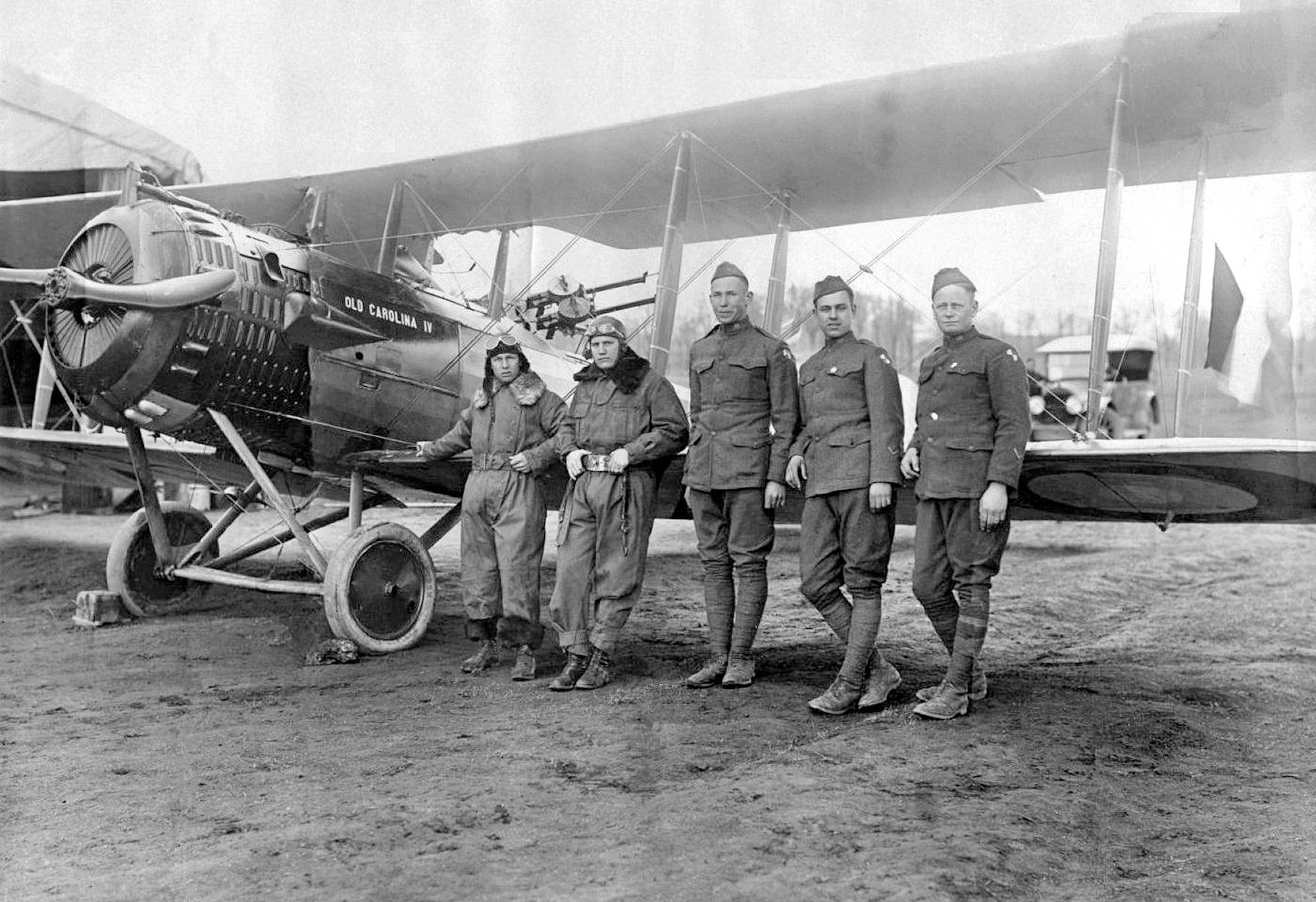
- 12th Aero Squadron Salmson 2A2 at Julvécourt, 1918

Site information
- Type: Combat Airfield
- Controlled by: Air Service, United States Army
- Condition: Agricultural area

Location
- Coordinates: 49°03′49″N 005°10′49″E

Site history
- Built: 1918
- In use: 1918–1919
- Battles/wars: World War I

Garrison information
- Garrison: I Corps Observation Group; United States First Army Air Service

Julvécourt Aerodrome was a temporary World War I airfield in France, used initially by the French Service Aéronautique, and later by the Air Service, United States Army. It was located 0.4 miles (0.64 km) West of Julvécourt, in the Meuse department in Lorraine in north-eastern France.

== Overview ==
The airfield was used from early 1916 by the French Air Services, until spring 1918, with six Bessonneau aircraft wood-and-canvas hangars, west of the village, along the D 21 road.

It was transferred to the American Air Services in the very last days of the war, with I Corps Observation Group HQ and two squadrons (1st Aero Squadron and 12th Aero Squadron) arriving on 3–5 November 1918.

The I Corps Observation Group HQ stayed at Julvécourt until demobilization in April 1919, but the two squadrons had left by the end of November 1918, ultimately bound for occupation forces in Germany.

The field was transferred back to the French authorities and then to agriculture. Today it is a series of cultivated fields with no indications of its wartime use.

== Known units assigned ==
- Headquarters, I Corps Observation Group, 5 November 1918 – 15 April 1919
- 12th Aero Squadron (Observation) 3 – 21 November 1918
- 1st Aero Squadron (Observation) 5 – 21 November 1918.

== See also ==
- List of Air Service American Expeditionary Force aerodromes in France
