= Ferme de Moras Aerodrome =

Temporary World War I airfield in France

- Part of American Expeditionary Forces (AEF)
- Located near: La Ferté-sous-Jouarre, France
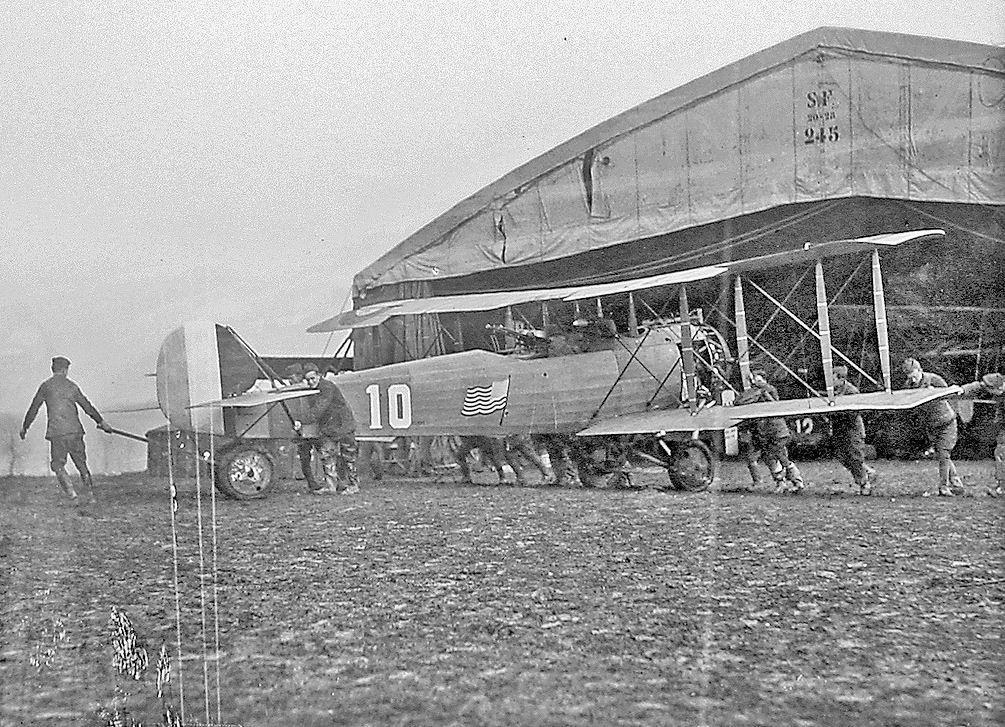
- Salmson 2A2 of the 1st Aero Squadron being pushed by maintenance personnel, Summer 1918.

Site information
- Type: Combat Airfield
- Controlled by: Air Service, United States Army
- Condition: Agricultural area

Location
- Coordinates: 48°56′32″N 003°10′19″E

Site history
- Built: 1918
- In use: 1918–1919
- Battles/wars: World War I

Garrison information
- Garrison: I Corps Observation Group; United States First Army Air Service

Ferme de Moras Aerodrome, was a temporary World War I airfield in France. It was 1.9 miles (3.1 km) east of the commune of La Ferté-sous-Jouarre, in the Île-de-France region in north-central France, approximately 41 miles (66 km) east of Paris. It was used by both French and American air units.

== Overview ==
The airfield was a temporary facility created by the French Aeronautique Militaire in late 1917, operational until December 1918, which means that it probably consisted of several wood-and-fabric Bessonneau hangars, plus wooden huts.

It was used for a short spell during summer 1918 by the I Corps Observation Group, during the Aisne-Marne Offensive Campaign. The two group's squadrons, 1st and 12th Aero Squadron operated from the field until moving out at the beginning of August to May-en-Multien Aerodrome, as did the group's HQ.

The last French "escadrille" left on 1 December 1918, and the airfield was soon cleared of all its building and returned to agricultural use. Today it is a series of cultivated fields located on the plateau 2 miles east of La Ferté sous Jouarre, north of D 407.

== Known units assigned ==
- I Corps Observation Group HQ 30 July – 5 August 1918
- 1st Aero Squadron (Observation) 22 July – 5 August 1918
- 12th Aero Squadron (Observation) 22 July – 3 August 1918

== See also ==
- List of Air Service American Expeditionary Force aerodromes in France
