= Julvécourt =

- Commune
- Location of Julvécourt
- Location within France Location within Grand Est
- Coordinates: 49°03′49″N 5°11′30″E
- Country: France
- Region: Grand Est
- Department: Meuse
- Arrondissement: Verdun
- Canton: Dieue-sur-Meuse
- Intercommunality: Val de Meuse - Voie Sacrée

Government
  - Mayor (2020–2026): Maryline Poutrieux
- Area^{1}: 8.7 km^{2} (3.4 sq mi)
- Elevation: 245 m (804 ft)
- Highest elevation: 297 m (974 ft)
- Lowest elevation: 230 m (750 ft)
- Population (2023): 62
  - Density: 7.1/km^{2} (18/sq mi)
- Time zone: UTC+01:00 (CET)
  - Summer (DST): UTC+02:00 (CEST)
- INSEE/Postal code: 55260 /55120
- ^{1} French Land Register data, which excludes lakes, ponds, glaciers > 1 km^{2} (0.386 sq mi or 247 acres) and river estuaries.

Julvécourt (French pronunciation: [ʒylvekuʁ]) is a commune in the Meuse department in Grand Est in north-eastern France.

== See also ==
- Communes of the Meuse department
