= I Corps Observation Group =

1st Corps Observation Group
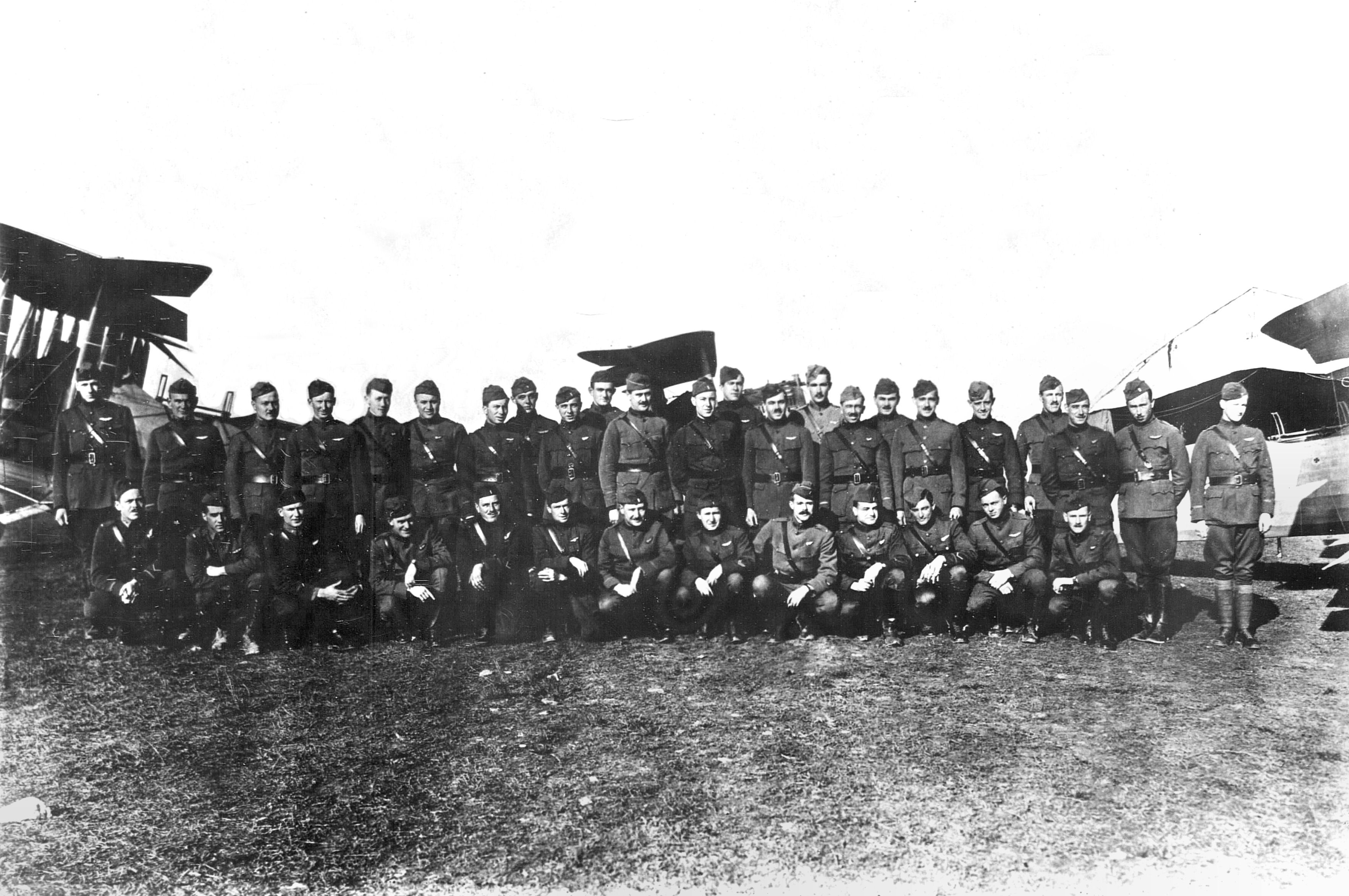
- 1st Aero Squadron, Julvecourt Aerodrome, France, November 1918
- Active: 21 April 1918-15 April 1919
- Country: United States
- Branch: United States Army Air Service
- Type: Group
- Role: Command and Control
- Part of: American Expeditionary Forces (AEF)
- Engagements: World War I: Champagne-Marne Defensive Campaign; Aisne-Marne Offensive Campaign; St. Mihel Offensive Campaign; Meuse-Argonne Offensive Campaign

Insignia
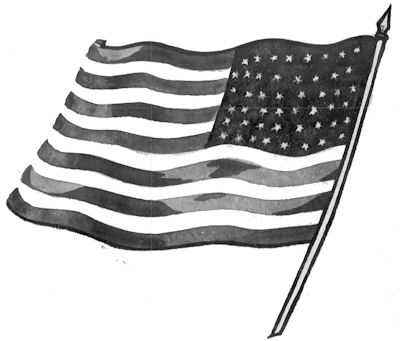
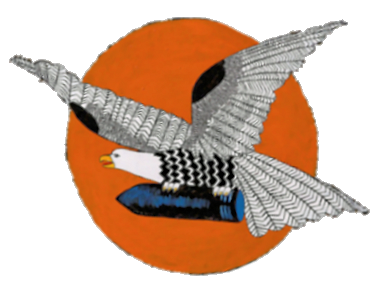
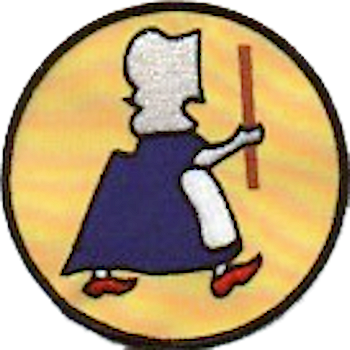
- Identification symbol: 1st Aero Squadron 12th Aero Squadron 50th Aero Squadron

The I Corps Observation Group was a United States Army Air Service unit that fought on the Western Front during World War I as part of the Air Service, First United States Army. It was demobilized in France after the 1918 Armistice with Germany on 15 April 1919.

There is no modern United States Air Force or Air National Guard unit that shares its lineage and history.

== Mission ==
The mission of the group was primarily to keep the friendly command informed of the general situation within the enemy lines by means of visual and photographic reconnaissances. It was called upon to effect, whenever necessary, the adjustment of U.S. Army artillery fire. In addition, it was expected that the group would serve to complete the schooling of pilots and observers and render them more competent to undertake intensive operations elsewhere on a larger and more complete scale.

== History ==
Organized in April 1918 as 1st Corps Observation Group. The assigned 1st Aero Squadron was the first American air unit to ever see action in France, being the same unit which served under General John J. Pershing as part of the Pancho Villa Expedition while chasing Pancho Villa into Mexico in 1916.

Assigned to the I Corps, United States Army Air Service, First United States Army. Commenced active operations over the front occupied by the 26th Division, United States Army, between Flirey and Apremont on that portion of the front known as the Toul sector.

The pilots of these squadrons, with one or two exceptions, had never before flown in combat. The group and squadron commanders were in every case men of long experience in training work but had never flown to an appreciable extent under war conditions.

The mission of the group was primarily to keep the friendly command informed of the general situation within the enemy lines by means of visual and photographic reconnaissances. It was called upon to effect, whenever necessary, the adjustment of our own artillery fire. In addition, it expected that the group would serve to complete the schooling of pilots and observers and render them more competent to undertake intensive operations elsewhere on a larger and more complete scale.

=== Lineage ===
- Organized in France as: I Corps Observation Group, 21 April 1918

Demobilized in France on 15 April 1919

=== Assignments ===
- Headquarters Air Service, I Corps, First Army, 21 April 1918 – 15 April 1919

=== Components ===
- 1st Aero Squadron (Corps Observation), 4 April– 18 November 1918
- 12th Aero Squadron (Corps Observation), 30 April 1918 – 18 November 1918
- 88th Aero Squadron (Corps Observation), 28 May 1918 - 25 July 1918
- 50th Aero Squadron (Corps Observation), 8 September 1918 – 1 April 1919
- Photographic Section No. 1, Apr–Nov 1918
- Escadrille BR 211, Aéronautique Militaire (Attached), June-Nov 1918

=== Stations ===
- Ourches Aerodrome, France, 21 April 1918
- Saints Aerodrome, France, 29 June 1918
- Francheville Aerodrome, 6 July 1918
- Ferme de Moras Aerodrome (near La Ferté-sous-Jouarre) France, 30 July 1918
- May-en-Multien Aerodrome, France, 5 August 1918
- Coincy Aerodrome, France, 10 August 1918
- Chailly-en-Brie Aerodrome, France, 12 August 1918
- Croix de Metz Aerodrome (Toul), France, 22 August 1918
- Remicourt Aerodrome, France, 20 September 1918
- Julvecourt Aerodrome, France, 5 November 1918 – 15 April 1919

== See also ==
- Organization of the Air Service of the American Expeditionary Force
