= Saints Aerodrome =

- Part of American Expeditionary Forces (AEF)
- Located near: Saints, France

Site information
- Type: Combat Airfield
- Controlled by: Air Service, United States Army
- Condition: Agricultural area

Location
- Coordinates: 48°46′04″N 003°03′33″E

Site history
- Built: 1918
- In use: 1918–1919
- Battles/wars: World War I

Garrison information
- Garrison: 1st Pursuit Group; I Corps Observation Group; United States First Army Air Service

Saints Aerodrome, was a temporary World War I airfield in France, used by a significant number of units of the Air Service, United States Army. It was located 0.7 miles (1.1 km) North of Saints, in the Île-de-France region in north-central France.

== Overview ==
The airfield was one of the many built to cope with the German offensive towards the river Marne which started in late May 1918. The first units to fly from the airfield were French "escadrilles", flying missions for the resisting French troops.

The newly operational American I Corps Observation Group arrived on 29 June with 1st Aero Squadron and 12th Aero Squadron, while 88th Aero Squadron stayed at Ourches, joining the Group later at Francheville. The stay was brief as the whole Group already moved and met together at Francheville Aerodrome, north of Coulommiers, on 6 July.

The 1st Pursuit Group moved into Saints shortly afterwards (9 July) with its four pursuit (fighter) squadrons and began flying offensive combat patrols over the Aisne-Marne Sector. From Saints, the group engaged in combat at the moment when the Allied armies were beginning to push back the German troops, a reverse move that would end with the Armistice on 11 November. As the front line was moving eastwards, the Group used Coincy Aerodrome as an advance airfield, as soon as the German flying units had left it on 1 August. By early September the front had moved quiet far from Saints and the 1st Pursuit Group moved up to Rembercourt Aerodrome to get closer to action.

As the 1st Pursuit Group moved out, the Saints Aerodrome had become useless and was abandoned, soon to be returned to agricultural use. Today it is a series of cultivated fields located north of Saints. The airfield was located to the north of the Départmental 15 (D15), with no indications of its wartime use.

== Known units assigned ==
- Headquarters, I Corps Observation Group, 29 June – 6 July 1918
- 1st Aero Squadron (Observation) 29 June – 6 July 1918
- 12th Aero Squadron (Observation) 29 June – 6 July 1918
- Headquarters, 1st Pursuit Group, 9 July – 1 September 1918
- 27th Aero Squadron (Pursuit) 9 July – 3 September 1918
- 94th Aero Squadron (Pursuit) 9 July – 1 September 1918
- 95th Aero Squadron (Pursuit) 9 July – 2 September 1918
- 147th Aero Squadron (Pursuit) 9 July – 1 September 1918

== See also ==
- List of Air Service American Expeditionary Force aerodromes in France
