= May-en-Multien Aerodrome =

- Part of American Expeditionary Forces (AEF)
- Located near: Meaux, France
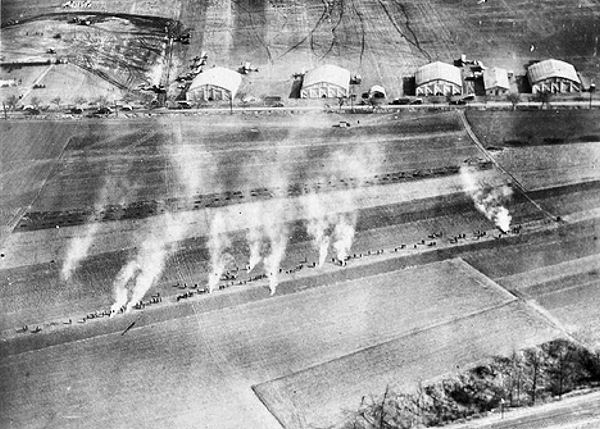
- May-en-Multien Aerodrome (note Bengal flares)

Site information
- Type: Combat Airfield
- Controlled by: Air Service, United States Army
- Condition: Agricultural area

Location
- Coordinates: 49°04′25″N 003°01′39″E; Approximate Location

Site history
- Built: 1918
- In use: 1918–1919
- Battles/wars: World War I

Garrison information
- Garrison: I Corps Observation Group; United States First Army Air Service

May-en-Multien Aerodrome, was a temporary World War I airfield in France, used for very short periods by French units and squadrons of the Air Service, United States Army. It was located 11 miles (18 km) north-northeast of the commune of Meaux, in the Île-de-France region in north-central France.

== Overview ==
The airfield was a temporary facility used by the French Aeronautique Militaire from early June 1918, most likely consisting of no more than a few tents, then later for a very short period on 5–10 August by the I Corps Observation Group as a forward operating airfield during the Aisne-Marne Offensive Campaign. Its HQ and two squadrons, the 1st and 12th Aero Squadron operated from the field until moving out during the middle of August to Coincy Aerodrome.

It was then once again used by the French Air Service on 7–21 September 1918. By the time of the Armistice, the airfield had already been returned to agricultural use.

== Known units assigned ==
- Headquarters, I Corps Observation Group, 5–10 August 1918
- 1st Aero Squadron (Observation) 5–10 August 1918
- 12th Aero Squadron (Observation) 3–10 August 1918

== See also ==
- List of Air Service American Expeditionary Force aerodromes in France
