= Francheville Aerodrome =

- Part of American Expeditionary Forces (AEF)
- near Mouroux, France
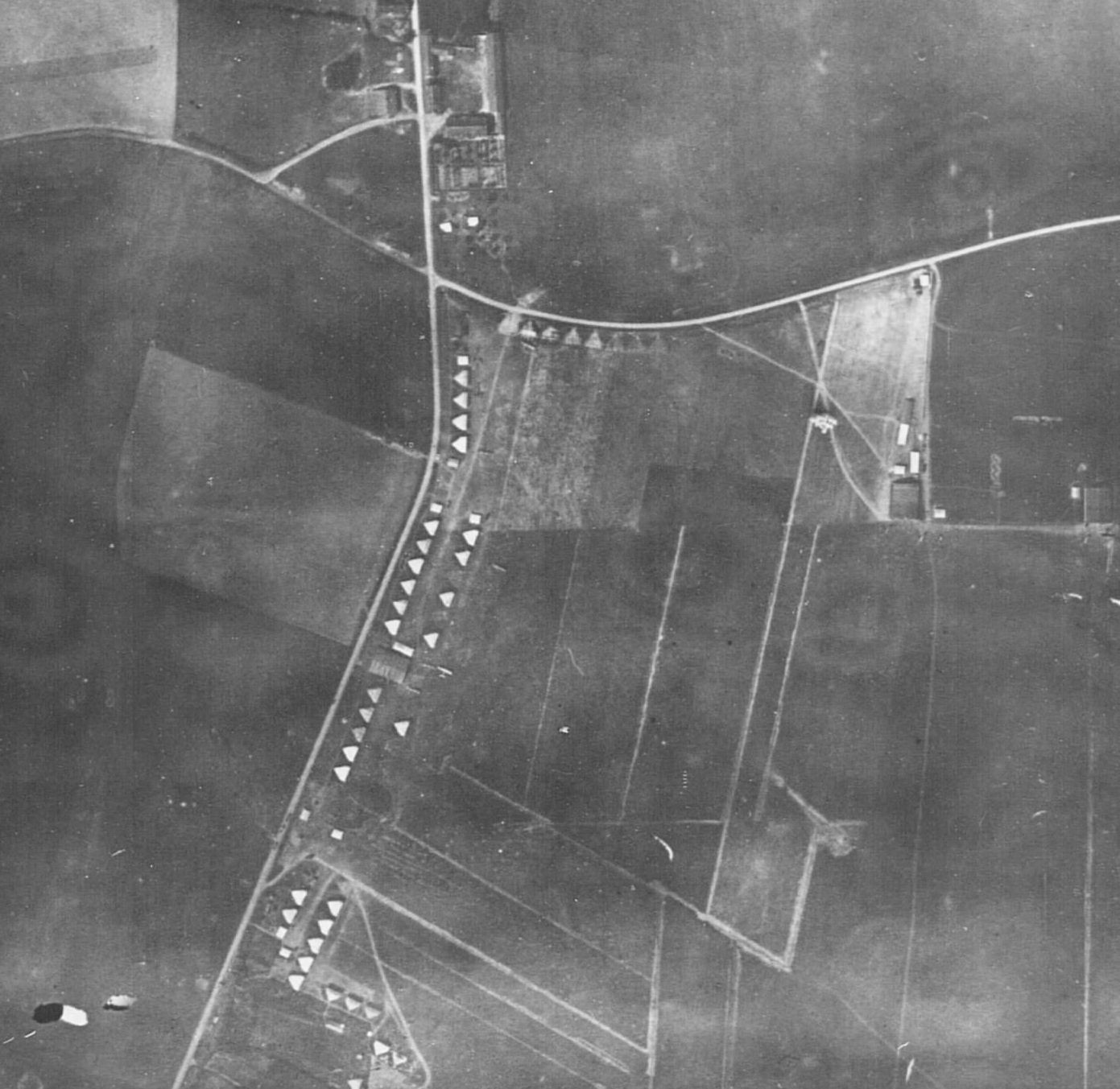
- Francheville Aerodrome, July 1918. Photographed by the 88th Aero Squadron

Site information
- Type: Combat airfield
- Controlled by: Air Service, United States Army
- Condition: Agricultural area

Location
- Coordinates: 48°51′01″N 03°02′34″E

Site history
- Built: 1918
- In use: 1918–19
- Battles/wars: World War I

Garrison information
- Garrison: I Corps Observation Group; United States First Army Air Service

Francheville Aerodrome was a temporary World War I airfield in France, used both by French units, and squadrons of the Air Service, United States Army. It was located 3.0 miles (4.8 km) north of Coulommiers, in the Île-de-France region in north-central France.

== Overview ==
The airfield was built in June 1918 in some haste as the German armies where were pushing through Allied forces towards Paris, on the River Marne. One French escadrille (SPA 124) was stationed as early as June 4, giving way to the I Corps Observation Group, with headquarter and three squadrons, providing aerial reconnaissance and artillery observation over the lines northwest of Château-Thierry:

- 1st Aero Squadron 6–22 July 1918
- 12th Aero Squadron 6–22 July 1918
- 88th Aero Squadron 7 July–4 August 1918

It was a very active sector with many enemy aircraft. The aircraft flew reconnaissance from 3am to 8pm and nearly every sortie meant combat with the enemy. At the end of July, as the German forces began their retreat, the group again moved to the Vesle Sector to perform reconnaissance prior to the St. Mihiel Offensive: the 1st and 12th squadrons left on 22 July, followed by HQ on 30 July, while 88th had transferred to III Corps Observation Group on 25 July, staying at Francheville until 4 August. French BR 237 stayed 30 July - 11 August, working for the French 6th Army then, as the battle front was fast moving away from the area, the airfield was abandoned and soon returned to agricultural use.

Today it is a series of cultivated fields located to the northwest of Coulommiers, at the crossroad of D 44 and a small road near the farm called "Les Fermiers", as shown on the photograph, with no indication of this short aviation activity.

== See also ==
- List of Air Service American Expeditionary Force aerodromes in France
