= 436th Training Squadron =

436th Training Squadron

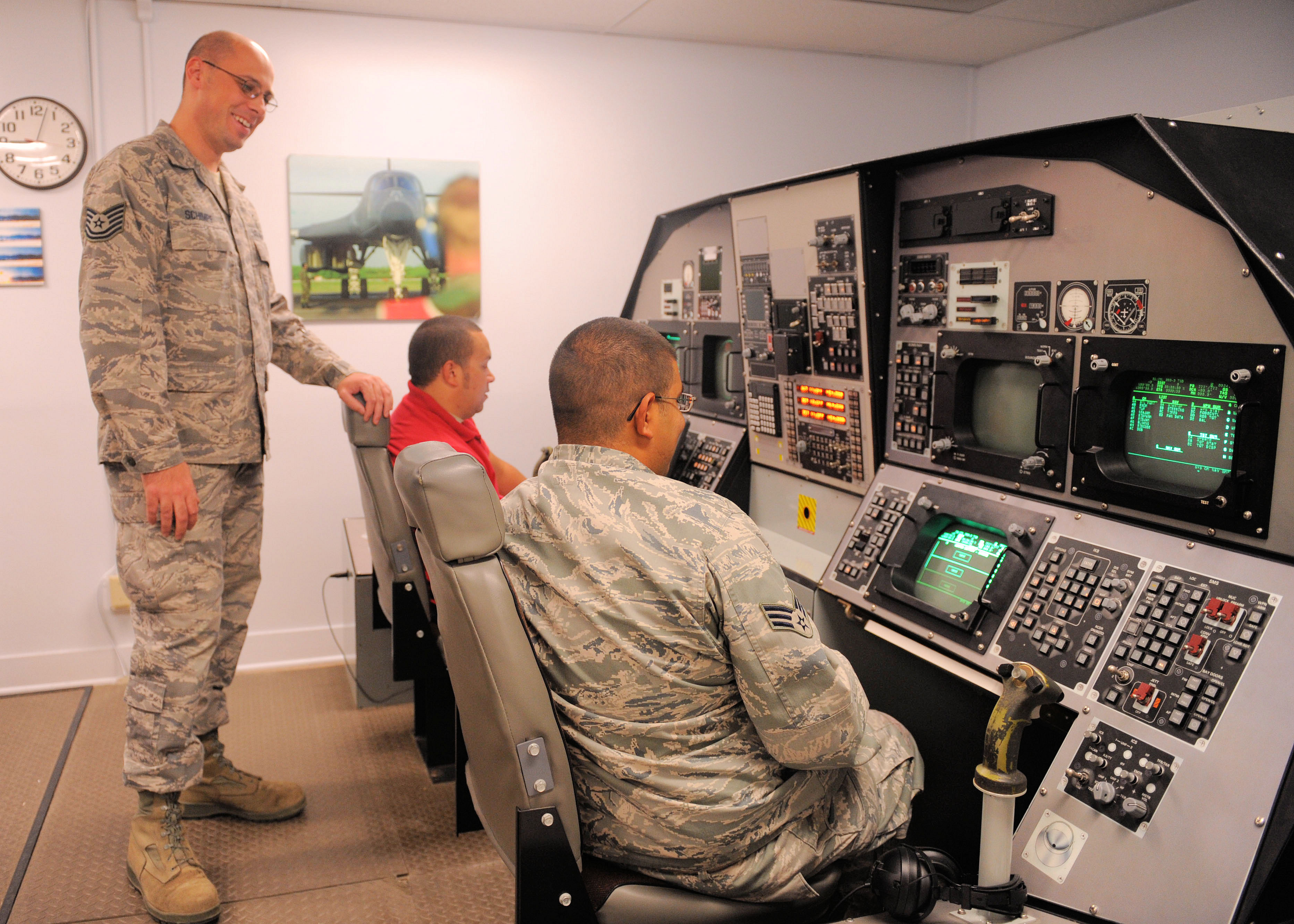
- A 436th Training Squadron instructor trains two individuals on the weapons flightline course at Dyess AFB
- Active: 1917–1927; 1928–1946; 1946–1963; 1986–present
- Country: United States
- Branch: United States Air Force
- Role: Training
- Size: Squadron
- Part of: Air Combat Command
- Garrison/HQ: Dyess Air Force Base, Texas
- Engagements: World War I Occupation of the Rhineland; Southwest Pacific Theater; China Burma India Theater
- Decorations: Distinguished Unit Citation; Air Force Meritorious Unit Award; Air Force Outstanding Unit Award

Commanders
- Notable commanders: Hugh J. Knerr; Lewis H. Brereton

Insignia
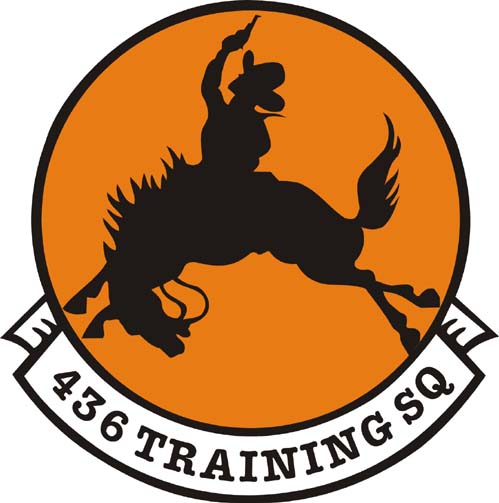
- 436th Training Squadron emblem (Note: Approved 20 July 2016.)

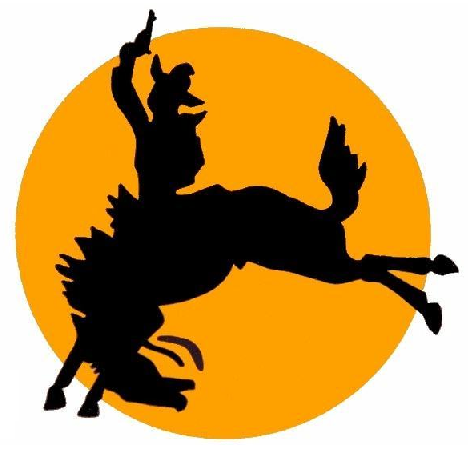
- 88th Observation Squadron emblem (Note: Approved 2 February 1924. Description: A rough rider in black in silhouette on an orange disc. This emblem was based on one approved for the 88th Aero Squadron on 15 November 1918 by the American Expeditionary Force. "World War I Aero Squadrons". Cross and Cockade Journal. 5 (2). Society of World War I Aero Historians: 145. 1964.)

The 436th Training Squadron is a non-flying training squadron of the United States Air Force. The 436th Training Squadron, located at Dyess Air Force Base, Texas, is a geographically separated unit within Air Combat Command’s 552nd Air Control Wing, at Tinker Air Force Base, Oklahoma.

The 436th is one of the oldest units in the United States Air Force, first being organized as the 88th Aero Squadron on 18 August 1917 at Kelly Field, Texas. The squadron deployed to France and fought on the Western Front during World War I as a Corps observation squadron.

The squadron returned to the United States in 1919. In 1921, it participated in tests off the Atlantic coast of Virginia designed to test the effectiveness of aircraft against battleships. Following the tests the squadron moved to Ohio, where it served as the aviation element of the 5th Division until 1927, when it moved to Texas as a training unit, but was inactivated shortly after the move and its personnel and equipment used to form another squadron. It was reactivated in 1928, becoming a long range reconnaissance unit in 1935. In 1941, it was ordered to reinforce the air defenses of the Philippines.

On 7 December 1941, elements of the 88th Reconnaissance Squadron were one of the Boeing B-17 Flying Fortress units that landed at Hickam Field, Hawaii during the Japanese attack on Pearl Harbor. Until March 1942, it engaged in combat missions in the Pacific. It moved to the China Burma India Theater, entering combat in June as the 436th Bombardment Squadron . It converted from the B-17 to the Consolidated B-24 Liberator in the combat zone in fall 1942. From June through October 1944, the squadron was removed from combat operations and was engaged in airlifting fuel to bases in China to support Boeing B-29 Superfortress strikes. It returned to combat and earned the Distinguished Unit Citation for an attack on railroads in Thailand. Following V-J Day, the squadron returned to the United States for inactivation.

The squadron was reactivated in 1946 as part of Strategic Air Command's (SAC) strike force. In 1948, it began flying Convair B-36 Peacemakers It converted to Boeing B-52 Stratofortresses and dispersed To Barksdale Air Force Base. It maintained half of its bombers on alert during the Cold War, and placed all planes on alert during the Cuban Missile Crisis. The 436th inactivated in 1963 in a general reorganization of SAC units.

The squadron was reactivated in its current role as the 436th Strategic Training Squadron in 1986

== Mission ==
The 436th Training Squadron provides formal training to Air Combat Command using 14 classes at Dyess Air Force Base, Texas and other programs exported directly to units for local training needs.

Training includes flight, ground and weapons safety, Air Force operations resource management system, classroom instructor training, aircrew flight equipment, and computer software use and development. The 436th Training Squadron also develops multimedia and formal presentations used in training program development and formal presentations. Multimedia personnel are based at Dyess and deploy worldwide to perform their mission. Unit products and services are used throughout the Department of Defense.

== History ==
=== World War I ===
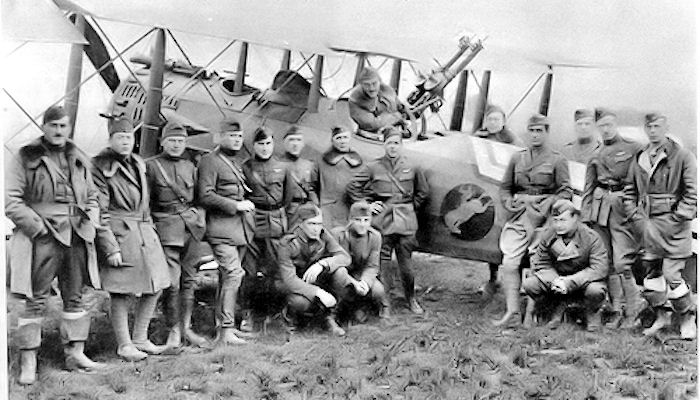
88th Aero Squadron members and aircraft in France

The squadron was organized at Kelly Field, Texas in August 1917 as the 88th Aero Squadron. It deployed to France on RMS Orduna in November 1917 and served on the Western Front during World War I . It engaged in combat as a corps observation squadron from 30 May 1918 until the Armistice of 11 November 1918, primarily with Salmson 2A2s. After the armistice, it served in the occupation force, until June 1919 when the squadron returned to the United States.

=== Inter-War era ===
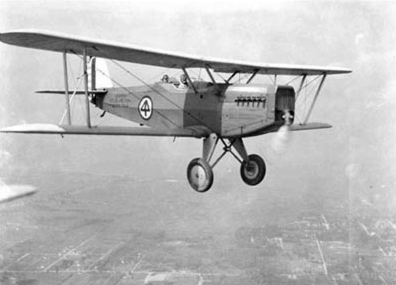
Douglas O-2 as flown by the squadron until inactivating in 1927

==== Observation operations ====
The squadron returned from Europe in the summer of 1919 and in July was stationed at Scott Field, Illinois, where it began to equip with Dayton-Wright DH-4s and Douglas O-2s. In the fall, it moved to Langley Field, Virginia, where it became part of the 1st Army Observation Group. In 1921, it was reassigned to the Air Service Field Officers School, as the 88th Squadron, but it was soon attached to the 1st Provisional Air Brigade for operations. With the 1st Brigade, it participated in demonstrations of the effectiveness of aerial bombardment on capital warships from June to September 1921. It deployed a detachment to Charleston, West Virginia for service in connection with civil disorders arising from West Virginia coal strikes in September 1921.

In October 1921 the squadron moved from Langley and Charleston to Godman Field, Kentucky to support Army ground forces as part of Fifth Corps Area in 1922, it moved to Wilbur Wright Field, Ohio, where it became the aviation element of the 5th Division, a Regular Army unit that was inactive, but whose headquarters was manned by Organized Reserve officers. (Note: The squadron commander also served as the Commander, 5th Division Air Service, which included the 7th Photo Section in addition to the squadron. See lists of commanders, Clay, pp. 1271, 1432. Although the division headquarters was inactive, its 10th Infantry Brigade was active and 5th Division support units were attached to the 10th Brigade during this period. Clay, p. 212. In addition, the 88th was designated as the associate unit for the 38th Pursuit Squadron, another Regular Army inactive unit. Clay, p. 1402.) The squadron became the 88th Observation Squadron in 1923. In May 1927, the squadron moved to Brooks Field, Texas, where it was assigned to the Air Corps Training Center, as reserve officers were withdrawn from the 5th Division. The squadron was inactivated at Brooks on 1 August, and its personnel and equipment formed the cadre for the 52d School Squadron.

The squadron was again activated at Post Field, Oklahoma on 1 June 1928 and assigned to Eighth Corps Area. However, it was attached to the Field Artillery School to provide support for the school's training mission. Although initially equipped with O-2s, it replaced them in 1930 with Thomas-Morse O-19s. It also carried Douglas O-31 monoplane observation aircraft and Douglas C-1 transport on strength. The squadron was assigned once again to a Regular Army inactive unit, the 14th Observation Group, but remained attached to the Field Artillery School.

The squadron was reassigned to the 12th Observation Group in the spring of 1931, but remained attached to the Field Artillery School until November 1931, when it moved to Brooks Field to join the 12th Group headquarters. In May 1933, it participated in the General Headquarters Air Force exercises in southern California.

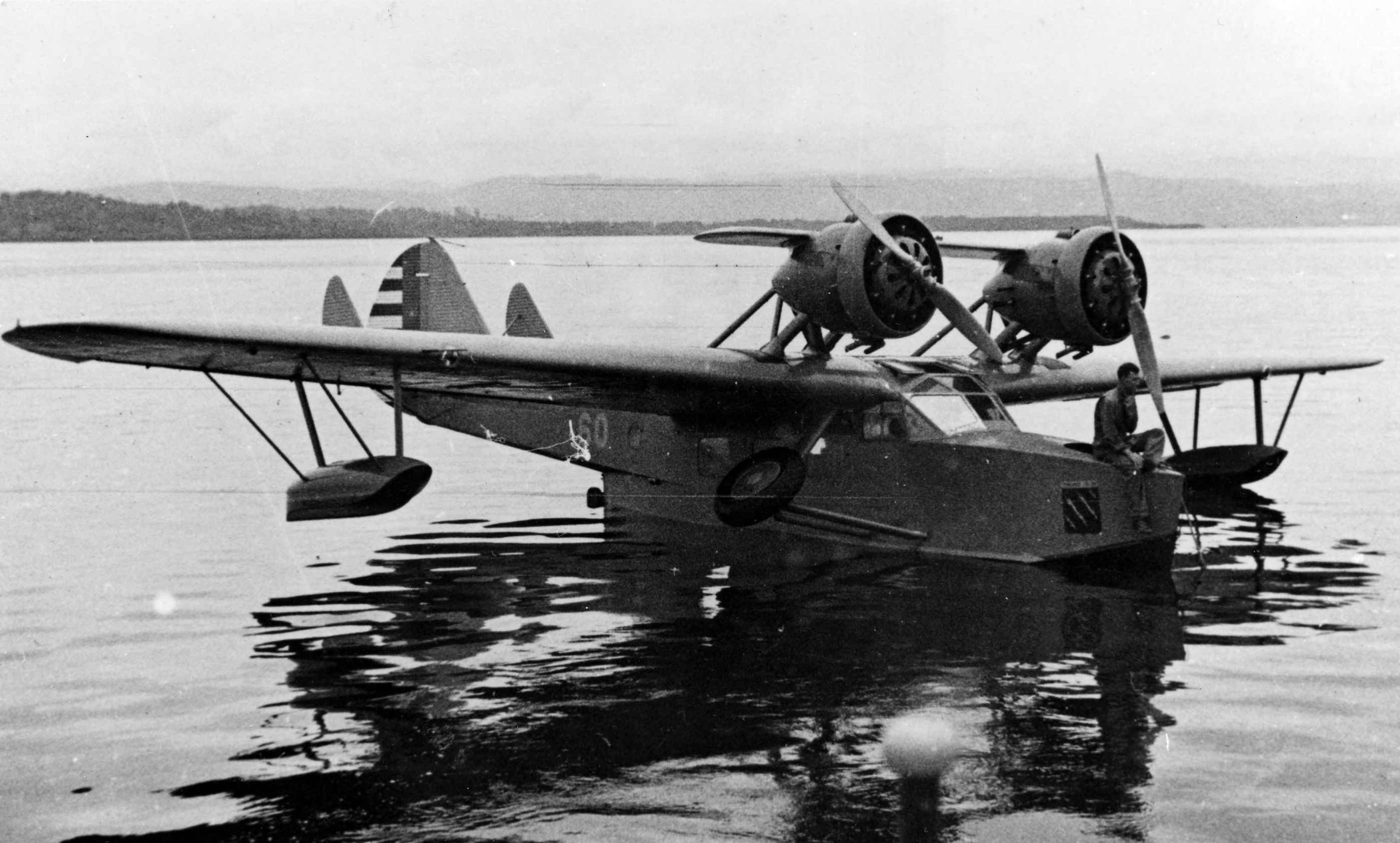
Air Corps Douglas Dolphin

==== Long range reconnaissance operations ====
In 1935, the squadron was redesignated the 88th Observation Squadron (Long Range, Amphibian) and was assigned to the 1st Wing in November, moving to the new Hamilton Field near San Francisco, California. In its first two months in the new unit role, it participated an both General Headquarters Air Force and 1st Wing maneuvers in Florida. Although the squadron operated Douglas OA-4 Dolphin and Sikorsky Y1OA-8 amphibians starting in 1935, it also acquired a number of longer range land based aircraft and in September 1936 it became the 88th Reconnaissance Squadron and was attached to the 7th Bombardment Group. The squadron dropped food and supplies and flew photographic missions in connection with flood-relief operations in central California, in December 1937. It ended its amphibious mission in 1938. The squadron was equipped with multiengine aircraft, primarily the Martin B-10 until 1937, when it transitioned to the Douglas B-18 Bolo. It began receiving early model Boeing B-17 Flying Fortresses in 1939.

In January 1940, the squadron participated in joint amphibious exercises at Fort Ord, California. It moved to Fort Douglas, Utah in September 1940 when the short runways at Hamilton proved inadequate for B-17 operations, operating out of the runways at Salt Lake City Airport, which was adjacent to Fort Douglas. The following January, the Army took over Salt Lake City's airport as Salt Lake City Army Air Base, a separate facility which became the squadron's base. In October 1941, the squadron and the rest of the 7th Bombardment Group was ordered to move to Clark Field, Philippines to build up forces there due to increased tensions between the United States and the Japanese Empire. Due to a lack of planes, some pilots were sent to Seattle to fly new B-17s overseas while the ground echelon departed on 12 November from Salt Lake City, by train, arriving at Angel Island by ferry; sailing on 20 November for Hawaii, on the troopship USS Republic. At Hawaii, the Republic joined a convoy escorted by the heavy cruiser the USS Pensacola (CA-24) for the Philippines, this was also known as the Pensacola Convoy. 7 December they had reached the Equator. Hearing the news of the attack on Pearl Harbor, the convoy changed course to Brisbane, Australia.

=== World War II ===
==== Operations in the Pacific ====
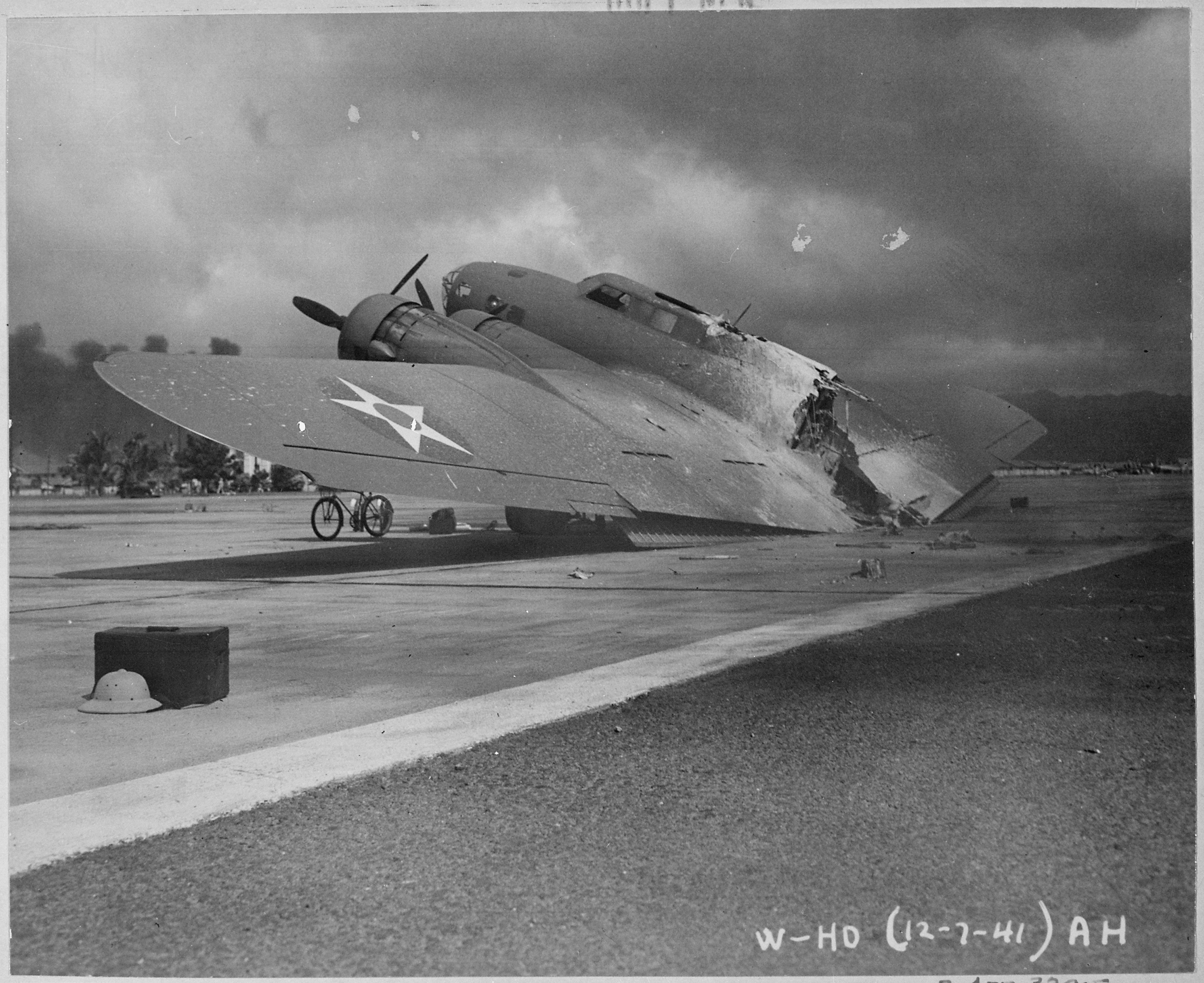
A burned B-17C at Hickam Field following the attack by Japanese aircraft on Hickam

The squadron's B-17s being ferried came under attack during their arrival at Hickam Field, Hawaii on 7 December in the middle of the Japanese attack on Pearl Harbor. Some of the planes managed to land at Haleiwa Fighter Strip, one set down on a golf course, and the remainder landed at Hickam under the strafing of Japanese planes. Following the attacks in Hawaii and the Philippines, the decision was made to divert the 7th Bombardment Group to Java, where it would be reunited with its ground echelon and begin operations there starting in January 1942. However, the 88th Squadron air echelon did not proceed across the Pacific with the other elements of the 7th Group, but remained behind to serve in the air defense of Hawaii until 10 February 1942. It spent a brief period flying missions from Nandi Airport in the Fiji Islands, before proceeding to Townsville Airfield, Australia later that month. However, by the time the squadron arrived in the Southwest Pacific, it had been determined that the 7th Group would not remain there, but would be sent forward to reinforce Allied forces in India. The squadron continued to fly missions from Australia until March 1942, when it moved to India.

==== Operations from India ====
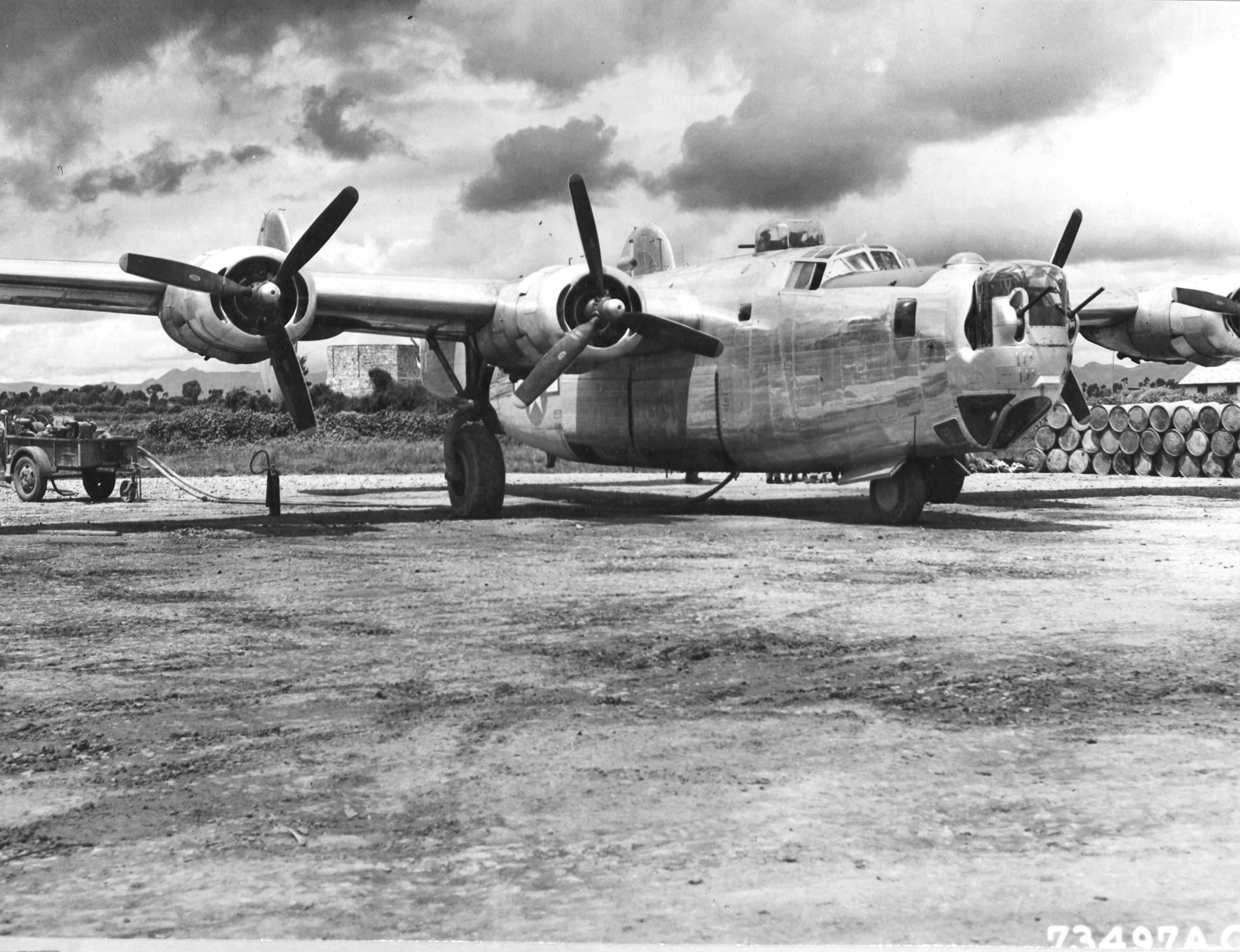
436th B-24J Liberator unloading fuel after flying "The Hump" (Note: Aircraft is B-24J-185-CO Liberator, serial 44-40852. Taken at 1944 Kunming, China on 6 September 1944.)

The squadron arrived in India in March 1942. It was redesignated the 436th Bombardment Squadron in April 1942. It flew its first mission in the China Burma India Theater on 4 June 1942. Later that month, the need for reinforcements against General Erwin Rommel's attacks in the Middle East resulted in the withdrawal of most of the 7th Bombardment Group's heavy bombers from the theater, and two of the group's squadrons converted to North American B-25 Mitchells, leaving the 436th as the only remaining squadron in the group flying B-17s. However, Clayton Bissell, commander of Tenth Air Force considered the B-17 unsuitable for the long range operations from India, and in August 1942, the decision was made to convert the group to a Consolidated B-24 Liberator unit.

Squadron operations were primarily directed against Japanese installations in Burma (Myanmar). The squadron attacked airfields, supply dumps, locomotive manufacturing facilities, and vulnerable sites in the Japanese line of communications, including docks, warehouses and shipping. Other targets included power plants in China oil refineries and railroads in Thailand, and shipping in the Andaman Sea.

On 10 June 1944, the squadron was taken off combat operations and provided support for Boeing B-29 Superfortress raids by transporting fuel to bases in China, an operation that continued through November 1944, then the squadron returned to attacking warehouses, shipping, and troop concentrations in Burma, although it maintained a detachment based at Luliang Airfield, China that continued the fuel transportation mission through January 1945. It received a Distinguished Unit Citation for an attack on railroads and bridges in the Kra Isthmus of Thailand, the narrowest point on the Malay Peninsula. on 19 March 1945, which disrupted Japanese lines of communication between Singapore and Bangkok. The mission lasted over 17 hours and was the longest formation flight in the CBI. In June 1945 it moved to Tezpur Airfield, India, which placed the squadron on the same station as the 7th Group for the first time since it left the United States.

However, later that month, the squadron resumed transporting fuel over the Hump to China. It continued this mission past V-J Day, ending it in September 1945. The squadron departed India in December 1945 and was inactivated on reaching Camp Kilmer, New Jersey, the Port of Embarkation, on 6 January 1946.

==== Bridge over the river Kwai ====
The bridge that was the subject of the film The Bridge on the River Kwai, based on the novel The Bridge over the River Kwai has been identified with Bridge 277 of the Burma Railway, over the Khwae Noi River. The real bridge was two parallel bridges, one wooden as depicted in the movie and one concrete. The bridges were constructed by prisoners of war in a forced labor camp. On 13 December 1943, an attack was made on the bridge, with the 436th providing flak suppression. Finally, on 13 February 1944, the concrete bridge was rendered unusable, although damage to the wooden bridge was repaired. On 3 April 1945, in an attack led by a crew from the 436th, the wooden bridge was destroyed and not rebuilt during the war.

=== Strategic Air Command ===
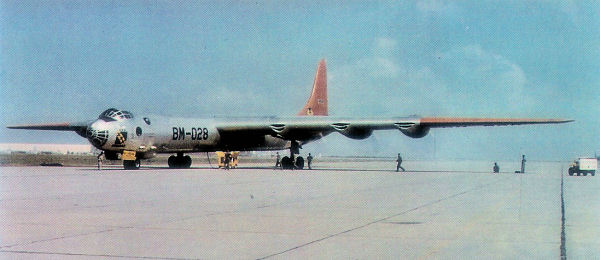
early B-36 of the 7th Bombardment Wing

==== B-36 era ====
In October 1946, the squadron was reactivated at Fort Worth Army Air Field, along with other elements of the 7th Bombardment /group and equipped initially with B-29 Superfortress bombers, and trained in global bombardment operations, flying simulated bombing missions over various cities, as well as performing intercontinental training missions over the Pacific and later to Europe. In late June 1948 the first five Convair B-36A Peacemakers were delivered to the 7th Bombardment Wing. The B-36As lacked combat equipment and were used primarily for transition and conversion training. In November 1948, the wing began to receive B-36Bs, which were capable of carrying nuclear weapons, By 1951, almost all B-36As and B-36Bs had been withdrawn from service to be modified to newer configuration. The 7th Wing conducted the first overseas deployment of the B-36 in January 1951, to RAF Lakenheath.

Strategic Air Command (SAC)’s mobilization for the Korean War highlighted that SAC wing commanders focused too much on running the base organization and not spending enough time on overseeing actual combat preparations. To allow wing commanders the ability to focus on combat operations, the air base group commander became responsible for managing the base housekeeping functions. Under the plan implemented provisionally in 1951, combat squadrons reported directly to the wing commander, who focused primarily on the wing's combat units and the maintenance necessary to support them. The plan became permanent in June 1952, as the 7th Bombardment Group was inactivated. From July to September 1955, the squadron deployed with the wing to Nouasseur Air Base, Morocco.

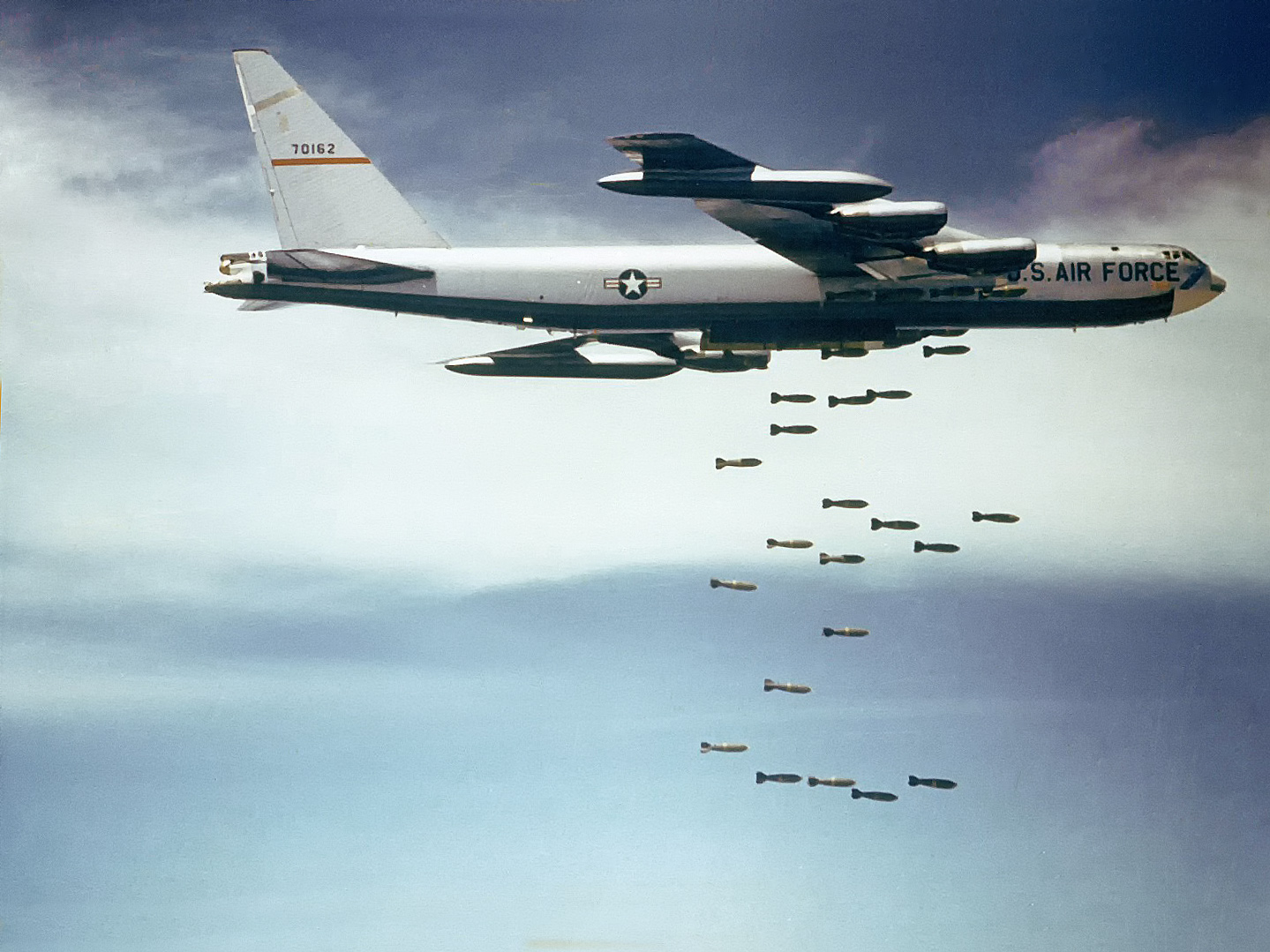
B-52F dropping conventionalbombs

==== B-52 era ====
In 1958, the squadron began to replace its B-36s with Boeing B-52F Stratofortresses. SAC bases with large concentrations of bombers made attractive targets. SAC’s response was to break up its wings and scatter their aircraft over a larger number of bases. SAC began to disperse its B-52 bombers over a larger number of bases, thus making it more difficult for the Soviet Union to knock out the entire fleet with a surprise first strike. On 15 April 1958, SAC ended its B-47 operations at Barksdale Air Force Base, Louisiana, when the 301st Bombardment Wing moved to Lockbourne Air Force Base, Ohio, where it replaced the 26th Strategic Reconnaissance Wing. 1 August 1958, the 436th dispersed to Barksdale. where it became the strike element of the new 4238th Strategic Wing.

Starting in 1960, one third of the squadron's aircraft were maintained on fifteen minute alert, fully fueled and ready for combat to reduce vulnerability to a Soviet missile strike. This was increased to half the squadron's aircraft in 1962.

Soon after detection of Soviet missiles in Cuba in 1962, on 20 October all B-52 units, including the 436th, were directed to put two additional planes on alert. On 22 October 1/8 of the B-52s were placed on airborne alert. On 24 October SAC went to DEFCON 2, placing all aircraft on alert. On 21 November SAC returned to normal airborne alert posture. On 27 November SAC returned to normal ground alert posture as tensions over Cuba eased.

In February 1963, The 2nd Bombardment Wing moved on paper from Hunter Air Force Base, Georgia and assumed the aircraft, personnel and equipment of the 4238th Strategic Wing, which was discontinued. The 4238h was a Major Command controlled (MAJCON) wing, which could not carry a permanent history or lineage, and SAC wanted to replace it with a permanent unit. The 436th was inactivated and its mission, personnel and equipment were transferred to the 2nd Wing's 20th Bombardment Squadron. While these actions were almost tantamount to redesignation, they were not official redesignations."

=== Training operations ===
The squadron reactivated in July 1986 at Carswell Air Force Base, Texas as the 436th Strategic Training Squadron to supported the SAC mission through classroom instruction, multimedia production, and training aid fabrication. With the disestablishment of SAC and Tactical Air Command in June 1992, the term "strategic" was dropped from the squadron name and the squadron was reassigned to Air Combat Command as the 436th Training Squadron. In 1993, the squadron moved to Dyess Air Force Base, Texas when Carswell became a joint reserve base. The squadron continues to provide classroom instruction for over 10 courses to students from every major command and multimedia productions used throughout the Department of Defense.

== Lineage ==
- Organized as the 88th Aero Squadron 18 August 1917

Redesignated 88th Aero Squadron (Corps Observation) on 28 May 1918
Redesignated 88th Aero Squadron on 27 June 1919
Redesignated 88th Squadron (Observation) on 14 March 1921
Redesignated 88th Observation Squadron on 25 January 1923
Inactivated on 1 August 1927

- Activated on 1 June 1928

Redesignated 88th Observation Squadron (Long-range, Amphibian) on 1 March 1935
Redesignated 88th Reconnaissance Squadron on 1 September 1936
Redesignated 88th Reconnaissance Squadron (Long Range) on 6 December 1939
Redesignated 88th Reconnaissance Squadron (Heavy) on 20 November 1940
Redesignated 436th Bombardment Squadron (Heavy) on 22 April 1942
Redesignated 436th Bombardment Squadron, Heavy on 3 July 1943
Inactivated on 6 January 1946

- Redesignated 436th Bombardment Squadron, Very Heavy on 1 October 1946

Activated on 1 October 1946
Redesignated 436th Bombardment Squadron, Heavy on 20 July 1948
Discontinued and inactivated on 1 April 1963

- Redesignated 436th Strategic Training Squadron on 14 February 1986

Activated on 1 July 1986
Redesignated 436th Training Squadron on 1 June 1992

=== Assignments ===
- Post Headquarters, Kelly Field, 18 August-11 October 1917
- Aviation Concentration Center, 11–27 October 1917
- American Expeditionary Forces, 9–16 November 1917
- 1st Air Depot, 16 November 1917
- 1st Observation Group School, 1 February-28 May 1918
- I Corps Observation Group, 28 May 1918
- III Corps Observation Group, 4 August 1918 (attached to V Corps Observation Group, 12–17 September 1918)
- VII Corps Observation Group, 29 November 1918
- American Expeditionary Forces, 1–10 June 1919
- Post Headquarters, Mitchell Field, 27 June 1919
- Post Headquarters, Scott Field, 11 July 1919
- 2d Wing, 5 September 1919 (attached to 1st Army Observation Group), October 1919
- 1st Army Observation Group, 24 March 1920
- Air Service Field Officer's School, 10 February 1921 – 14 October 1921 (attached to 1st Provisional Air Brigade for operations, 6 May – 3 October 1921)
- Fifth Corps Area 15 October 1921
- 5th Division Air Service, 1 July 1923
- Air Corps Training Center 1 May–1 August 1927
- Eighth Corps Area 1 June 1928 (attached to Field Artillery School)
- 14th Observation Group, 8 May 1929 (attached to Field Artillery School)
- 12th Observation Group 30 June 1931 (attached to Field Artillery School until November 1931)
- 1st Wing 1 March 1935 (attached to 7th Bombardment Group after 1 September 1936, air echelon attached to 31st Bombardment Squadron, 10 December 1941 – 8 February 1942, United States Navy)
- 7th Bombardment Group 25 February 1942 – 6 January 1946 (air echelon attached to United States Navy until 14 March 1942)
- 7th Bombardment Group, 1 October 1946 – 15 June 1952 (attached to 7th Bombardment Wing after 14 February 1951)
- 7th Bombardment Wing 16 June 1952
- 4238th Strategic Wing, 1 August 1958 – 1 April 1963
- Strategic Air Command, 1 July 1986
- Air Combat Command, 1 June 1992
- 7th Bomb Wing 1 October 1993
- 7th Operations Group 1 July 1994
- 552nd Operations Group, 30 Sep 2015
- 552nd Training Group, 17 Aug 2018 – present

=== Stations ===
- Kelly Field, Texas, 18 August 1917
- Aviation Concentration Center, Garden City, New York, 11–27 October 1917
- Colombey-les-Belles Airdrome, France, 16 November 1917
- Amanty Airdrome, France, 1 February 1918
- Ourches Aerodrome, France, 28 May 1918
- Francheville Aerodrome, France, 7 July 1918
- Ferme des Greves Aerodrome, France, 4 August 1918
- Goussancourt Airdrome, France, 4 September 1918
- Ferme des Greves Aerodrome, France, 9 September 1918
- Souilly Aerodrome, France, 12 September 1918
- Pretz-en-Argonne Airdrome, France, 14 September 1918
- Souilly Aerodrome, France, 20 September 1918
- Bethelainville Aerodrome, France, 4 November 1918
- Villers-la-Chevre Aerodrome, France, 29 November 1918
- Trier Airfield, Germany, 6 December 1918
- Le Mans, France, 1–10 June 1919
- Mitchel Field, New York, 27 June 1919
- Scott Field, Illinois, 1 July 1919
- Langley Field, Virginia, 5 September 1919 (detachment operated from Charleston, West Virginia, 3–8 September 1921, detachment remained at Charleston until October 1921)
- Godman Field, Kentucky, 15 October 1921
- Wilbur Wright Field, Ohio, 11 October 1922
- Brooks Field, Texas, 7 May – 1 August 1927
- Post Field, Oklahoma, 1 June 1928
- Brooks Field, Texas, 5 November 1931
- Hamilton Field, California, 28 September 1935
- Fort Douglas, Utah, 7 September 1940
- Salt Lake City Army Air Base, Utah, c. 15 January – 11 November 1941
- Archerfield Airport, Australia, 22 December 1941 – 4 February 1942 (air echelon operated from Hickam Field, Hawaii, 7 December 1941 – 10 February 1942; Nandi Airport, Fiji Islands, 12–17 February 1942; RAAF Base Townsville, Australia, 20 February – c. 14 March 1942
- Karachi, India, 12 March 1942 (operations from Townsville continued to c. 14 March 1942)
- Allahabad, India, 1 June 1942
- Gaya Airfield, India, 14 November 1942
- Bishnupur Airfield, India, 25 February 1943
- Panagarh Airfield, India, 25 September 1943
- Madhaiganj Airfield, India, 13 December 1943
- Tezgaon Airfield, India, 14 June 1944
- Madhaiganj Airfield, India, 6 October 1944 (detachment based at Luliang Airfield, China, December 1944 – January 1945)
- Tezpur Airfield, India, 1 June – 7 December 1945
- Camp Kilmer, New Jersey, 5–6 January 1946
- Ft Worth Army Air Field (later Carswell Air Force Base), Texas, 1 October 1946
- Barksdale Air Force Base, Louisiana, 1 August 1958 – 1 April 1963
- Carswell Air Force Base, Texas 1 July 1986
- Dyess Air Force Base, Texas 5 March 1993 – present

=== Aircraft ===
- Dorand Avion de Reconnaissance 1 and 2 (AR 1 AR 2), 1918
- Sopwith 1½ Strutter, 1918
- Salmson 2A2, 1918–1919
- Dayton-Wright DH-4, 1919–1921
- Douglas O-2, 1919–1927, 1928-1930
- Thomas-Morse O-19, 1930–1935
- Douglas O-31, 1930–1933
- Douglas C-1, 1930–1933
- Douglas O-43, 1934–1935
- Douglas O-35, 1935–1937
- Fokker O-27, 1935–1938
- Douglas OA-4 Dolphin, 1935–1938
- Sikorsky Y1OA-8, 1935–1938
- Douglas B-7, 1935–1938
- Martin B-10, 1935–1938
- Martin B-12, 1936-c. 1937
- Douglas B-18 Bolo, 1937–1940
- Boeing B-17 Flying Fortress, 1939–1942
- Consolidated B-24 Liberator, 1942–1945
- Boeing B-29 Superfortress, 1946–1948
- Convair B-36 Peacemaker, 1948–1958
- Boeing B-52 Stratofortress, 1958–1963

=== Awards and campaigns ===
| Award streamer | Award | Dates | Notes |
|---|---|---|---|
| | Distinguished Unit Citation | 19 March 1945 | Thailand 436th Bombardment Squadron |
| | Air Force Meritorious Unit Award | 1 June 2013-31 May 2015 | 436th Training Squadron |
| | Air Force Meritorious Unit Award | 1 June 2015-31 May 2016 | 436th Training Squadron |
| | Air Force Meritorious Unit Award | 1 June 2020-31 May 2021 | 436th Training Squadron |
| | Air Force Outstanding Unit Award | 1 July 1986-30 June 1988 | 436th Strategic Training Squadron |
| | Air Force Outstanding Unit Award | 1 July 1988-30 June 1990 | 436th Strategic Training Squadron |
| | Air Force Outstanding Unit Award | 1 July 1990-29 May 1990 | 436th Strategic Training Squadron |
| | Air Force Outstanding Unit Award | 1 June 1992-30 June 1994 | 436th Training Squadron |
| | Air Force Outstanding Unit Award | 1 June 1996-31 May 1998 | 436th Training Squadron |
| | Air Force Outstanding Unit Award | 1 June 1998-31 May 2000 | 436th Training Squadron |
| | Air Force Outstanding Unit Award | 1 June 2002-31 May 2004 | 436th Training Squadron |
| | Air Force Outstanding Unit Award | 1 June 2005-31 May 2007 | 436th Training Squadron |

| Campaign Streamer | Campaign | Dates | Notes |
|---|---|---|---|
| | Champagne-Marne | 15 July 1918 – 18 July 1918 | 88th Aero Squadron |
| | Aisne-Marne | 18 July 1918 – 16 August 1918 | 88th Aero Squadron |
| | Oise-Aisne | 18 August 1918 – 11 November 1918 | 88th Aero Squadron |
| | St Mihiel | 12 September 1918 – 16 September 1918 | 88th Aero Squadron |
| | Meuse-Argonne | 26 September 1918 – 11 November 1918 | 88th Aero Squadron |
| | Champagne | | 88th Aero Squadron |
| | Ile-de-France | | 88th Aero Squadron |
| | Lorraine | | 88th Aero Squadron |
| | World War I Army of Occupation (Germany) | 12 Nov 1918–1 June 1919 | 88th Aero Squadron |
| | Central Pacific | 7 December 1941 – 14 March 1942 | 88th Reconnaissance Squadron |
| | East Indies | 1 January 1942 – 14 March 1942 | 88th Reconnaissance Squadron |
| | Burma | 12 March 1942 – 26 May 1942 | 88th Reconnaissance Squadron (later 436th Bombardment Squadron) |
| | India-Burma | 2 April 1943 – 28 January 1945 | 436th Bombardment Squadron |
| | Central Burma | 29 January 1945 – 15 July 1945 | 436th Bombardment Squadron |
| | China Defensive | 4 July 1942 – 4 May 1945 | 436th Bombardment Squadron |
| | China Offensive | 5 May 1945 – 2 September 1945 | 436th Bombardment Squadron |
| | Air Combat, Asiatic–Pacific Theater | 7 December 1941 – 10 September 1945 | 436th Bombardment Squadron |

== See also ==
- List of American aero squadrons
- B-17 Flying Fortress units of the United States Army Air Forces
- United States Army Air Forces in Australia
- B-24 Liberator units of the United States Army Air Forces
- List of B-29 Superfortress operators
- List of B-52 Units of the United States Air Force
