= Douglas O-46 =

US military observation aircraft in service 1936-1942

O-46
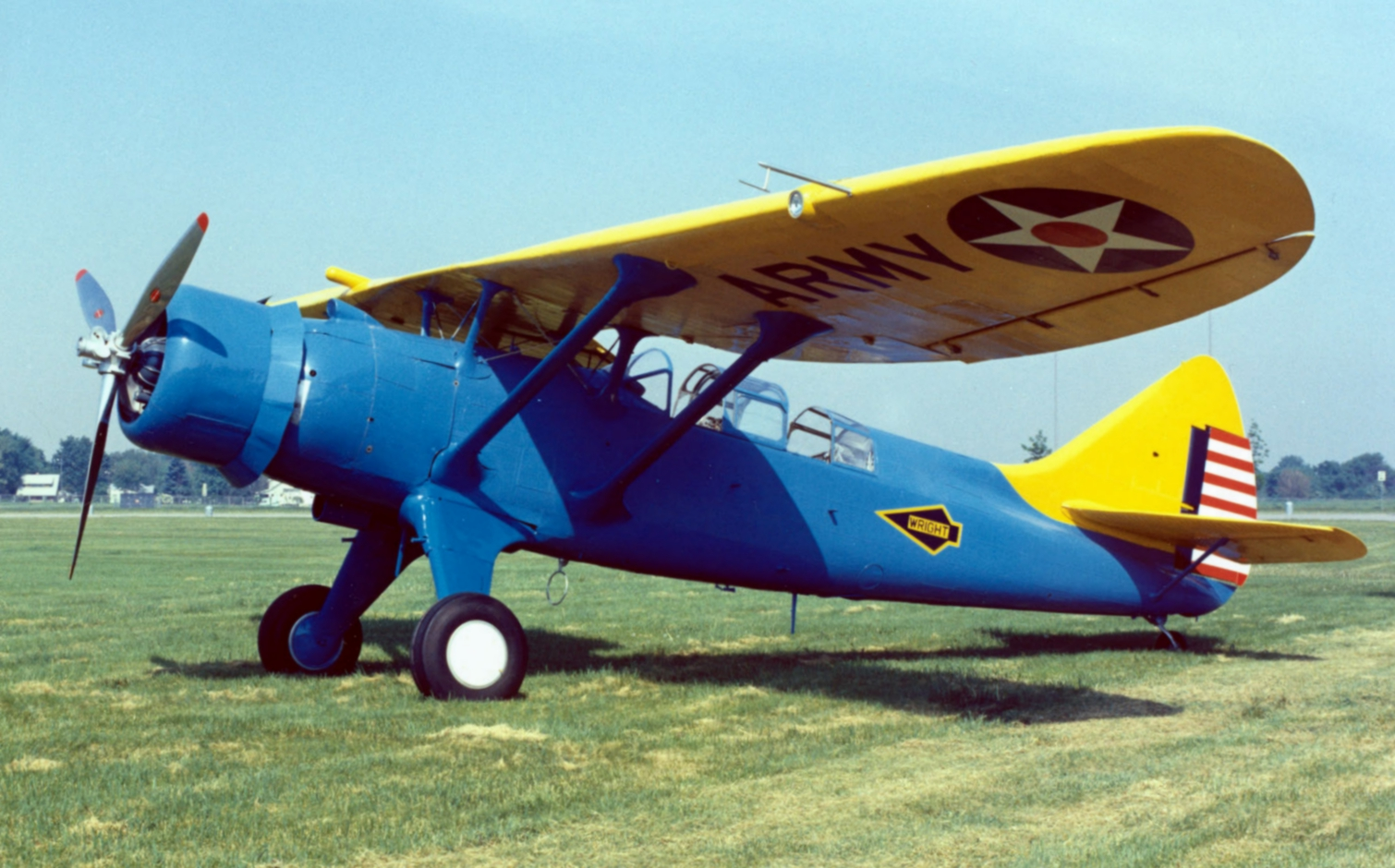
- Douglas O-46A at National Museum of the United States Air Force

General information
- Type: Observation
- Manufacturer: Douglas Aircraft Company
- Primary user: United States Army Air Corps
- Number built: 90

History
- Manufactured: 1936-1937
- Introduction date: 1936
- First flight: 1935
- Developed from: Douglas O-43

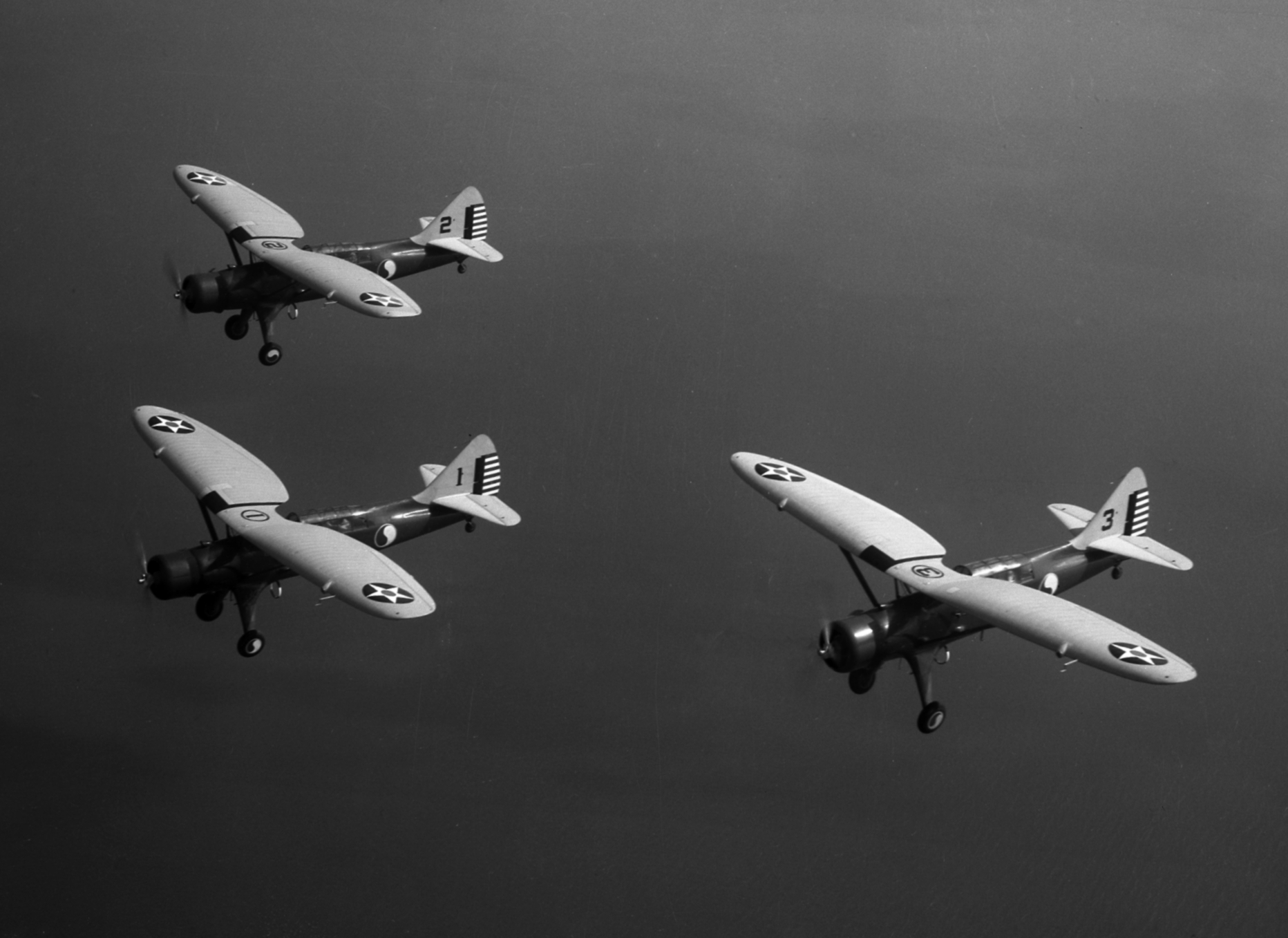
Three O-46 in formation in 1938

The Douglas O-46 is an observation aircraft used by the United States Army Air Corps and the Philippine Army Air Corps. It entered service in the late 1930s, and saw action in WW2. It became obsolescent later in the war as an observation craft, but was used for liaison, training, and ASW patrols. One airframe has survived as a museum piece into the present day.

== Design and development ==
The O-46A, the last of a long line of Douglas observation aircraft, was a victim of progress. It was designed to operate from established airfields behind fairly static battle lines as in World War I. However, in 1939, a report was issued on the O-46A which stated that it was too slow and heavy to outrun and outmaneuver enemy fighter aircraft, too heavy to operate from small, wet, unprepared fields, and too large to conceal beneath trees. This report was a forecast of the future, for World War II with its rapidly changing battle lines proved the need for light, maneuverable observation aircraft which could operate from unimproved airstrips. Consequently, in 1942, the "O" (observation) designation was changed to "L" (liaison).

The O-46 was a development of the earlier Douglas O-43. The 24th airframe of the O-43A contract was completed as the XO-46 prototype, with a revised wing and an engine switch, from the O-43's inline engine to a radial engine, the Pratt & Whitney R-1535-7. The Air Corps ordered 90 O-46As in 1935. They were built between May 1936 and April 1937.

== Operational history ==
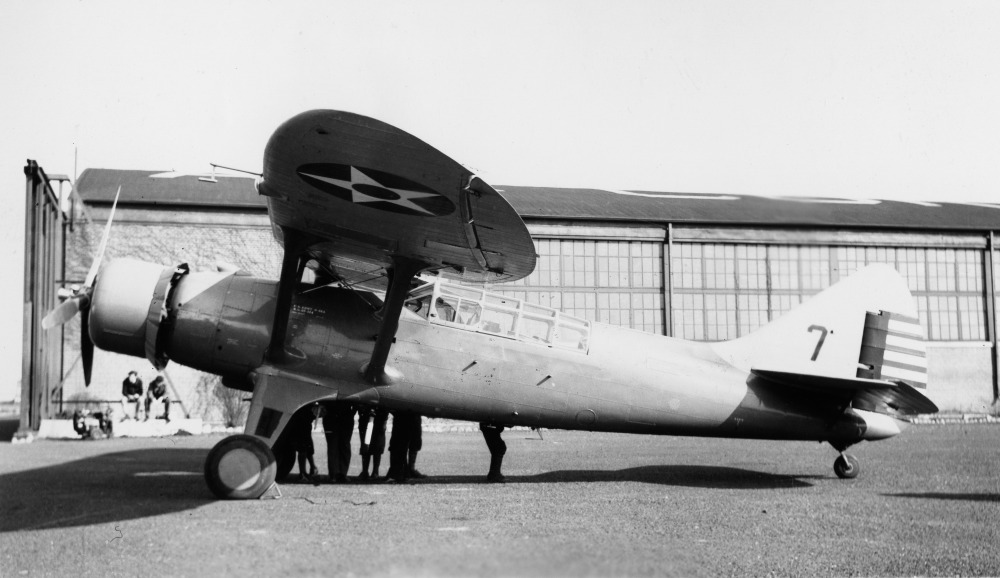
Douglas O-46

At least 11 O-46s saw overseas duty; two were destroyed in the Japanese raid on Clark Field in the Philippines on 8 December 1941. The Maryland Air National Guard operated O-46As off the coast of New Jersey for anti-submarine duty. The remainder were declared obsolete in late 1942 and after that were used primarily in training and utility roles.

A proposed variant with a Wright R-1670-3 engine received the designation O-48 but was not built.

== Surviving aircraft ==
The only surviving O-46A (s/n 35-179) is currently in storage in the collection of the National Museum of the United States Air Force at Wright-Patterson AFB near Dayton, Ohio. On 27 November 1942, the aircraft was part of the 81st Air Base Squadron, when it landed downwind at Brooks Field, Harlingen, Texas, ran out of runway and overturned. Written off, it was abandoned in place. More than 20 years later it was discovered by the Antique Airplane Association with trees growing through its wings, and in 1967, it was rescued and hauled to Ottumwa, Iowa. Restoration turned out to be beyond the organization's capability, and in September 1970, it was traded to the National Museum of the United States Air Force for a flyable Douglas C-47 Skytrain. The (then) Air Force Museum had it restored at Purdue University, and placed it on display in 1974, the sole survivor of the 91 O-46s built.

== Specifications (O-46A) ==
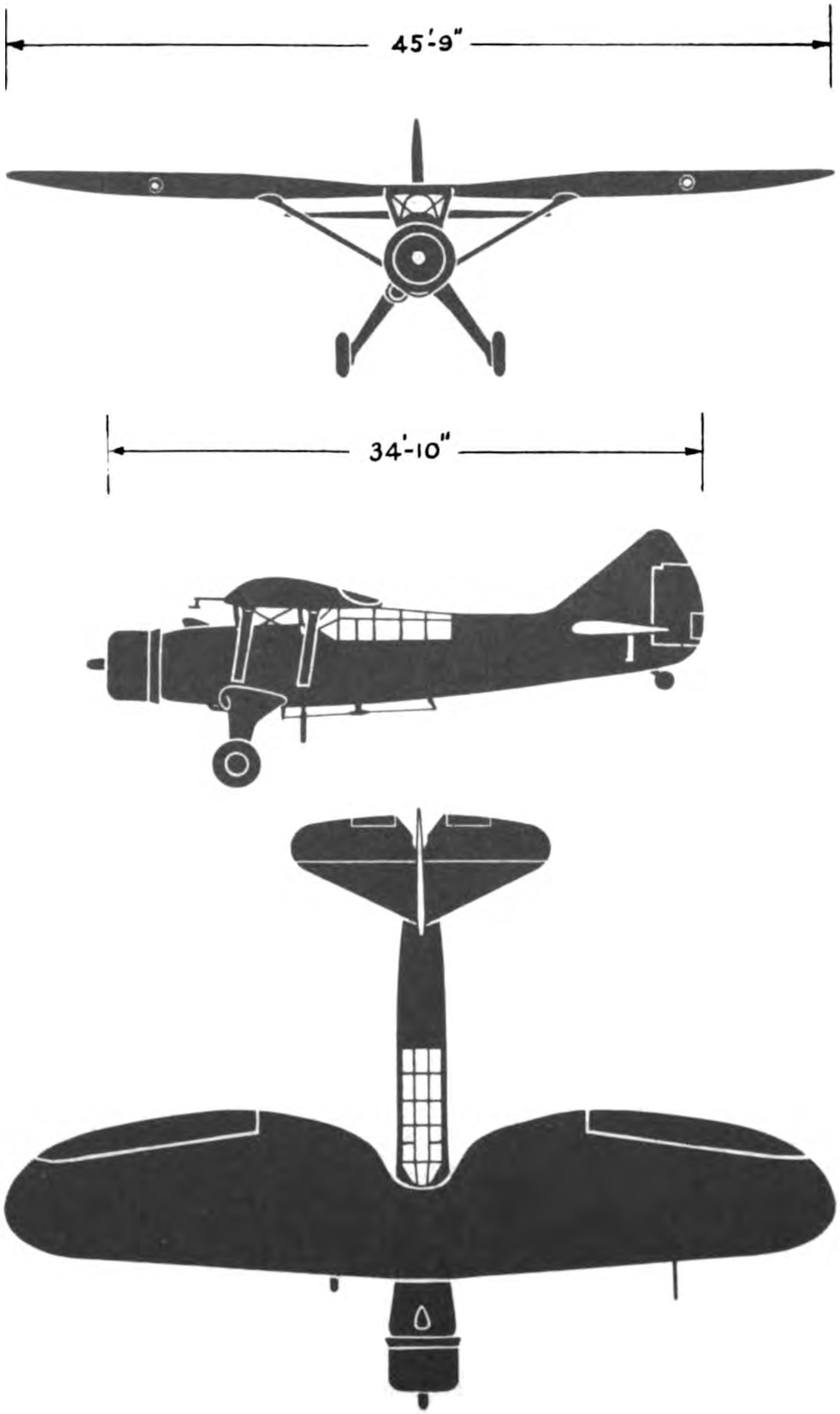
3-view silhouette of the Douglas O-46A

Data from McDonnell Douglas Aircraft since 1920

General characteristics

- Crew: 2
- Length: 34 ft 6.75 in (10.5347 m)
- Wingspan: 45 ft 9 in (13.94 m)
- Height: 10 ft 8.5 in (3.264 m)
- Wing area: 332 sq ft (30.8 m^{2})
- Empty weight: 4,776 lb (2,166 kg)
- Gross weight: 6,639 lb (3,011 kg)
- Powerplant: 1 × Pratt & Whitney R-1535-7 Twin Wasp Junior 14-cylinder two-row air-cooled radial piston engine, 725 hp (541 kW)
- Propellers: 3-bladed metal propeller

Performance

- Maximum speed: 200 mph (320 km/h, 170 kn) at 4,000 ft (1,200 m)
- Cruise speed: 171 mph (275 km/h, 149 kn)
- Range: 435 mi (700 km, 378 nmi)
- Service ceiling: 24,150 ft (7,360 m)
- Rate of climb: 1,765 ft/min (8.97 m/s)
- Wing loading: 20 lb/sq ft (98 kg/m^{2})
- Power/mass: 1.087 hp/lb (1.787 kW/kg)

Armament

- Guns: * 2 × .30 cal (7.62 mm) Browning machine guns (one wing mounted and one flexible)

== See also ==
Related development

- Douglas O-43

Aircraft of comparable role, configuration, and era

- Henschel Hs 126

Related lists

- List of military aircraft of the United States
