= Junkers Ju 252 =

German transport aircraft

Ju 252
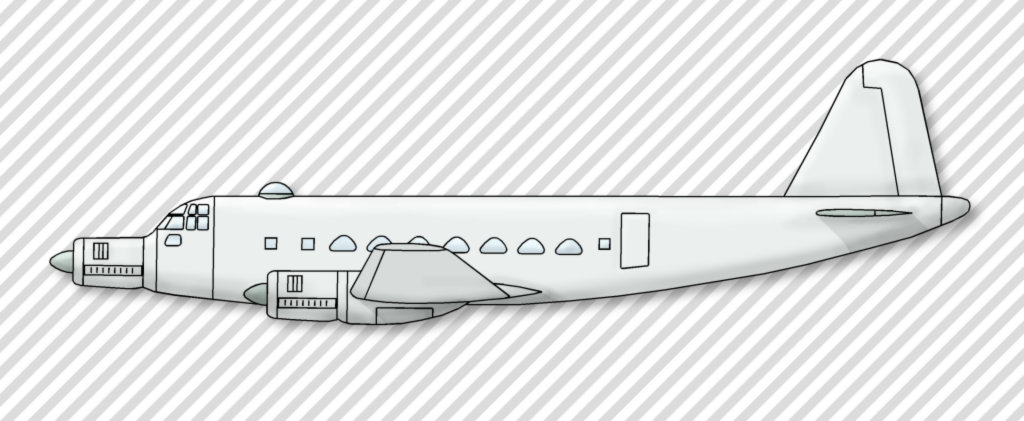

General information
- Type: Transport
- National origin: Germany
- Manufacturer: Junkers
- Primary user: Luftwaffe
- Number built: 15

History
- Introduction date: January 1943
- First flight: 1 August 1942
- Variant: Junkers Ju 352

The Junkers Ju 252 was a German cargo aircraft that made its first flight on 1 August 1942. The aircraft was planned as a replacement for the Junkers Ju 52/3m in commercial airline service, but only a small number were built as cargo aircraft for the Luftwaffe.

== Design and development ==
The original Ju 252 came about after talks between Junkers and Deutsche Lufthansa in December 1938. Lufthansa requested a new design that would replace the Ju 52, but offer much greater loads, seating, range and performance. Junkers responded with the EF.77 design with a pressurized fuselage with seating for up to 35, making it one of the larger airliners in the world at that time. It was powered by three Junkers Jumo 211F engines, in nacelles almost identical in appearance, each complete with annular radiator and possibly as Kraftei unitized "power-egg" modular engine installations, to those on Jumo 211-powered versions of the Junkers Ju 88, replacing the BMW 132 of the Ju 52, which dramatically improved performance. Compared to the Ju 52, the Ju 252 was twice as heavy (13,100 kg vs. 5,600), was over 100 km/h faster (440 km/h vs. 305), and had dramatically improved range (3980 km vs. 1300) when fully loaded. Design was headed by Konrad Eicholtz.

By the time the prototype was ready to fly in October 1941, the war was already in progress and the Luftwaffe took over development. Like earlier tail-dragger designs, the Ju 252 would normally be difficult to load when parked, owing to the sloping floor. Junkers had already pioneered - with the earlier Junkers Ju 90's fifth and sixth prototype airframes during 1939 - a unique solution to this problem, the Trapoklappe, a hydraulically powered ventral rear loading ramp that possessed powerful enough operating mechanisms to lift the plane off its tailwheel, leveling the floor and allowing oversized cargo to be loaded directly forward into the fuselage. Even though all cargo aircraft since World War II have used tricycle landing gear undercarriage designs, the Trapoklappe concept of a rear loading ramp that forms the opening rear ventral panel of the fuselage of a cargo aircraft, is a ubiquitous feature of most military airlift cargo aircraft to the present day.

Although the Ju 252 was a vast improvement over the Junkers Ju 52/3m, the situation at that time did not permit any disruption of the existing production lines, and the Reich Air Ministry (RLM) was of the opinion that any replacement for the Junkers Ju 52/3m must make minimum demands on supplies of strategic materials and use power plants not required by combat aircraft. Junkers was then instructed to investigate the possibility of redesigning the Ju 252 in order that a considerable portion of wood could be included in its structure, simultaneously replacing the Junkers Jumo 211F engine with the BMW Bramo 323R engine of which surplus stocks existed. The result was the Junkers Ju 352. Production of the Ju 252 was restricted to already completed prototypes plus those for which major assemblies had already been semi-completed, thus only fifteen transports of this type were completed before production was switched to the Junkers Ju 352.

== Variants ==
Ju 252, initial variant. 15 built.

Ju 352, redesign of the Ju 252 constructed of non-strategic materials and powered by Bramo 323R radial engines. 50 built.

Ju 452, derivative of the Ju 252 to be constructed from wood.

== Specifications (Ju 252A) ==
Data from Warplanes of the Third Reich

General characteristics

- Crew: 3-4
- Length: 25.11 m (82 ft 5 in)
- Wingspan: 34.1 m (111 ft 11 in)
- Height: 5.75 m (18 ft 10 in)
- Wing area: 122.6 m^{2} (1,320 sq ft)
- Empty weight: 13,127 kg (28,940 lb)
- Gross weight: 22,257 kg (49,068 lb)
- Max takeoff weight: 24,050 kg (53,021 lb)
- Powerplant: 3 × Junkers Jumo 211F V-12 inverted liquid-cooled piston engines, 1,007 kW (1,350 hp) each
- Propellers: 3-bladed constant-speed propellers

Performance

- Maximum speed: 438 km/h (272 mph, 237 kn) at 5,800 m (19,000 ft)
- Cruise speed: 335 km/h (208 mph, 181 kn) (econ. cruise)
- Range: 3,981 km (2,474 mi, 2,150 nmi) with maximum payload

6,600 km (4,100 mi; 3,600 nmi) with 2,000 kg (4,409 lb) payload

- Service ceiling: 6,300 m (20,700 ft)
- Rate of climb: 12.5 m/s (2,460 ft/min)

Armament

- Guns:
  - 1 × 13 mm MG 131 machine gun in dorsal turret
  - 2 × 7.92 mm MG 15 machine guns in side windows

== See also ==
Related development

- Junkers Ju 52
- Junkers Ju 352

Related lists

- List of military aircraft of Germany
- List of World War II military aircraft of Germany
