= Henschel Hs 122 =

Type of aircraft

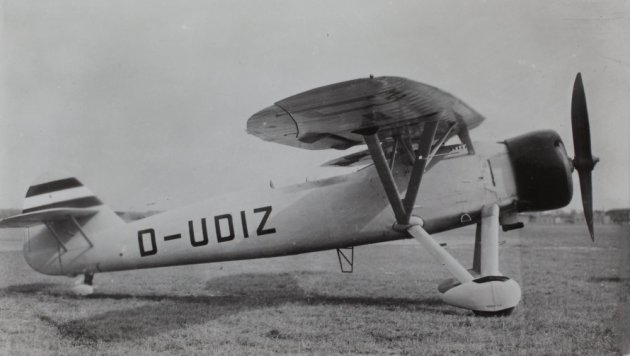

General information
- Type: general-purpose military
- National origin: Germany
- Manufacturer: Henschel Flugzeug-Werke A.G.

History
- Introduction date: 1936
- First flight: 1935

The Henschel Hs 122 was a German army cooperation/reconnaissance aircraft of the mid-1930s, radial-engined and with a parasol wing. Though only pre-production variants entered service, the Hs 122 led on to the Hs 126 which was produced in large numbers.

== Development ==
The Hs 122 was the Henschel company's second aircraft, its first, the Hs 121 not being intended for production. It was designed in response to a Reich Air Ministry call for a multi-role army co-operation aircraft to replace the ageing Heinkel He 46.

The design emerged as a single-engine two-seat parasol wing machine with a fixed undercarriage. The wing centre section was carried above the fuselage on a series of short struts and the swept outer sections were braced to the lower fuselage with V struts. The wings were built around two metal spars and had metal-covered leading edges and upper surfaces with fabric elsewhere. The fuselage was an elliptical metal monocoque, with a metal-structured tail also metal covered apart from fabric control surfaces. The tailplane was mounted about halfway up the fin, supported by a parallel pair of struts. The spatted mainwheels were each mounted on V struts to the fuselage. The cockpits were open, with the pilot sitting below a cut-out in the wing trailing edge and the second crew member in a separate cockpit aft.

The first prototype, registered D-UBYN, was powered, like several other German aircraft of the time including the Messerschmitt Bf 109, by a Rolls-Royce Kestrel V-12-cylinder water-cooled engine; but the next prototype (D-UBAV) had a 460 kW (610 hp) Siemens Sh 22B 9-cylinder supercharged radial.

There were at least three prototypes, followed by a small number of pre-production Siemens-powered Hs 122B-0 aircraft which entered service in 1936. These were followed on the Henschel production lines at Schönefeld by the more powerful Hs 126.

== Specifications (Hs 122 B-0) ==
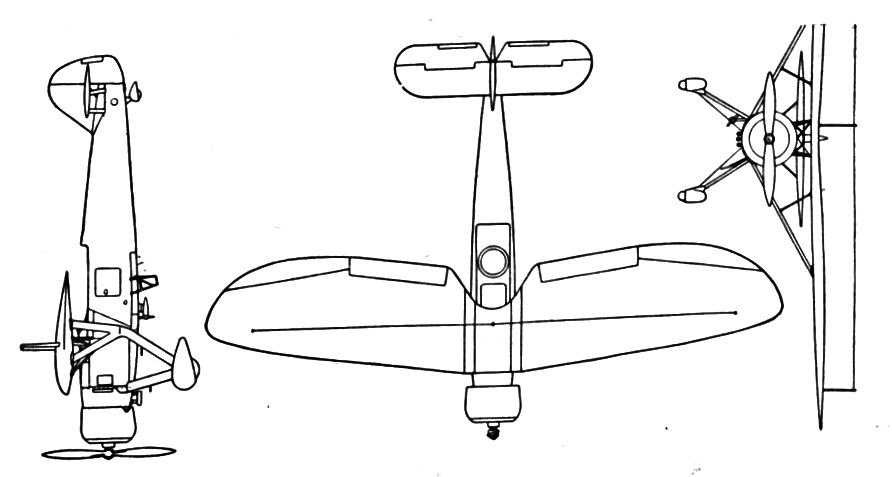
Henschel Hs 122 3-view drawing from L'Aerophile September 1939

Data from Grey 1972, p. 157c

General characteristics

- Crew: 2
- Length: 10.1 m (33 ft 1.5 in)
- Wingspan: 14.5 m (47 ft 7 in)
- Height: 3.4 m (11 ft 2 in)
- Wing area: 34.7 m^{2} (373.3 sq ft)
- Empty weight: 1,650 kg (3,630 lb)
- Gross weight: 2,530 kg (5,566 lb)
- Powerplant: 1 × Siemens-Halske Sh 22B 9-cylinder supercharged radial also known as Bramo 322B , 455 kW (610 hp)

Performance

- Maximum speed: 265 km/h (165 mph, 143 kn)
- Range: 600 km (373 mi, 324 nmi)
- Endurance: 2.6 hours
- Service ceiling: 6,600 m (21,650 ft)
- Rate of climb: 6.4 m/s (1,260 ft/min) to 1,000 m (3,280 ft)

Armament

- 1 × 7.92 mm (.312 in) MG 17 machine gun firing forward
- 1 × 7.92 mm (.312 in) MG 15 machine gun on mounting in rear cockpit
