= Arado Ar 232 =

1941 airlifter by Arado

Ar 232
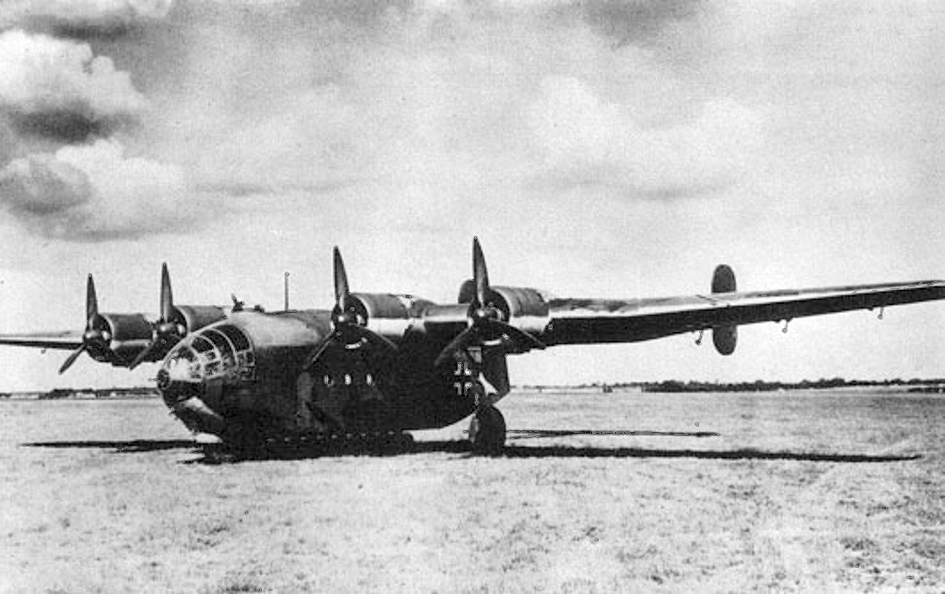
- Arado Ar 232B-0

General information
- Type: Transport
- National origin: Germany
- Manufacturer: Arado Flugzeugwerke
- Primary user: Luftwaffe
- Number built: ~20

History
- Introduction date: 1943
- First flight: June 1941
- Retired: 1945

The Arado Ar 232 Tausendfüßler (German: "Millipede"), sometimes also called Tatzelwurm, was a cargo aircraft that was designed and produced in small numbers by the German aircraft manufacturer Arado Flugzeugwerke. It was designed during the first half of the Second World War in response to a request by the Reichsluftfahrtministerium (German Air Ministry, RLM) for a successor or supplemental transport aircraft to the Luftwaffe's obsolescent Junkers Ju 52/3m. The Ar 232 introduced, or brought together, almost all of the features now considered to be standard in modern cargo transport aircraft designs, including a box-like fuselage slung beneath a high wing; a rear loading ramp (that had first appeared on the December 1939-flown Junkers Ju 90 V5 fifth prototype four-engined transport via its Trapoklappe), a high-mounted twin tail for easy access to the hold and features for operating from rough fields. It was initially requested to be powered by a pair of BMW 801A/B radial engines, but instead four BMW Bramo 323 engines were used due to a lack of capacity.

The first twin-engine prototype performed its maiden flight in June 1941, while the first four-engine prototype followed roughly one year later. The type demonstrated clear performance advantages over the Ju 52/3m and limited pre-production orders were placed, leading to roughly 20 aircraft being constructed. The envisioned mass production of the Ar 232 was never attained, primarily due to Germany having an abundance of transport aircraft in production and thus it did not purchase large numbers of Ar 232s. Several aircraft did see operational use, to aid wartime production efforts and on the front line. Arado's design team continued to work on refinements, including economy measures and the enlarged six-engined Ar 632 variant. At one point, German officials expected quantity production of the type to be attained in October 1945 but the war ended instead. Two Ar 232s were captured by the British and operated for a time between England and Germany following the conflict.

== Development ==
As with many German aircraft, the availability of suitable engines seriously impacted development and production.

=== 2-engined Ar 232A ===
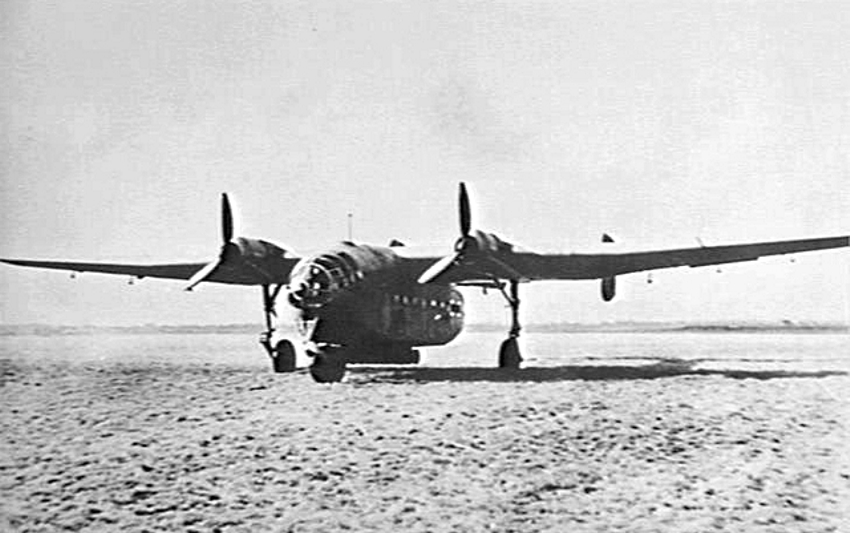
An Ar 232A-0 in 1945

What would become the Ar 232 originated from a tender offered by the Reichsluftfahrtministerium (RLM/German Aviation Ministry) issued during late 1939 which sought a replacement for the ubiquitous Ju 52/3m transport. Both Arado and Henschel were requested to design a rear-loading aircraft that was to be powered by a pair of 1,193 kW (1,600 hp) BMW 801A/B radial engines, which was just entering prototype production and not currently used on any front-line designs. Arado's design team was headed by the aeronautical engineer Wilhelm van Nes. The basic configuration selected was that of a cantilever mid-wing smooth-skinned monocoque design with a spacious cargo area that was as low to the ground as feasibly possible. Furthermore, the aircraft was to be relatively robust and capable of operating from austere airstrips and rough terrain, possess short takeoff and landing (STOL) capabilities, and permit rapid loading and unloading times.

=== Engine discussion — parallel development ===
Following a review of the competing aircraft, Arado's design was selected over Henschel's, leading to the company receiving an initial order for three prototypes in 1940. However, the desired power plant for the Ar 232 was challenged by the Focke-Wulf Fw 190 project, which also used the same BMW 801A/B engine. Production of the BMW 801 was insufficient to fulfil all of the prospective demands, thus Arado was compelled to adopt an alternative engine for the Ar 232. Eventually, the BMW Bramo 323 Fafnir nine-cylinder radial engine, weighing roughly 550 kg (1,210 lbs) each, from Focke-Wulf's Fw 200 land-based maritime patrol aircraft was selected as the alternate powerplant. The Bramo 323 was in mass production and could meet requirements if the Ar 232 entered quantity service. The prototypes were far enough along that switching engines would have delayed the program, thus the first two aircraft were to be completed as the Ar 232A with the original BMW 801, while the third and a newly ordered fourth prototype were designated as the Ar 232B. The third and fourth prototypes, and subsequent production aircraft, used four Bramo 323 engines in order to provide the desired performance.

The first two prototypes, bearing the Stammkennzeichen alphabetic codes GH+GN and VD+YB respectively, were completed in early 1941 and commenced trials shortly after. The first flight suffered a partial landing gear failure during landing; while the nose gear collapsed, the twenty-two "millipede wheels" saved the aircraft from damage. The cause was determined to be a stuck oleo strut, which was too short when fully extended, and was rectified via the insertion of a ring.

The general performance of the Ar 232 exceeded the Ju 52/3m in multiple respects; it carried roughly double the load over longer distances, operated from shorter runways and rougher fields if need be, and cruised about 70 km/h (44 mph) faster. A further ten pre-production aircraft were constructed; these saw operational used as the Ar 232A-0 while awaiting production versions.

=== 4-engined Ar 232B ===
The Ar 232B program proceeded in parallel to this effort. With the quartet of 895 kW (1,200 hp) Bramo 323s replacing the twin BMW 801s, each Bramo 323 with its aforementioned 550 kg dry weight apiece; power increased from 2,386 kW (3,200 hp) to 3,580 kW (4,800 hp), solving the Ar 232A's problem of having little excess power in case of engine failure. This change also required the wing to be extended slightly, the span increasing just over 3 m (9 ft 10 in) in total. The extra weight of the Bramo 323 engines also moved the center of gravity forward, which was offset by stretching the cargo area rearward another meter, expanding the cargo capacity it could carry internally.

During May 1942, the first of the two four-engined prototypes, V3, performed its maiden flight. A further 10 aircraft were then ordered as the Ar 232B-0, and were used widely in an operational role. However, this was the only order for the design, as the Luftwaffe gave transport aircraft production a relatively low priority. Many of those aircraft produced were used by Arado to transport aircraft parts between its factories, and did not see front-line service.

=== Ar 432 ===
Various improvements to the Ar 232 were planned, such as the replacement of the outer wing sections and control surfaces with wooden versions to conserve aluminium. Originally to be known as the Ar 232C, the design effort was protracted and was later redesignated the Ar 432. During June 1944, plans were finally put into place to start production in October 1945, but the conflict came to an end without even a prototype being produced. Two even larger planned versions, the Ar 532 and the Ar 632, would have almost doubled the wingspan to 60 m (196 ft 10 in), as large as Germany's six-engined BV 238 flying boat design, and added another two engines. An amphibian transport, the Ar 430, was also projected for use in the Mediterranean.

== Design ==
The Ar 232 was a multi-engined transport aircraft. It was normally operated by a crew of four, of which the pilot was the only member without two roles. The navigator also operated a 13 mm (.51 in) MG 131 machine gun in the nose, while the radio operator could also use a 20 mm MG 151 cannon in a rotating turret on the roof, and the loadmaster was provisioned with a 13 mm (.51 in) MG 131 machine gun that fired rearward from the extreme rear of the cargo bay above the cargo doors.The aircraft could be outfitted with various auxiliary kits to suit certain operational circumstances, such as winter/tropical kits, a radio set, a rubber liferaft, an oil-burning heater, and an emergency power unit.

The cargo bay of the Ar 232, which was directly behind the aircraft's "stepless cockpit", was 6.6 m (21 ft 7¾ in) long, 2.3 m (7 ft 6½ in) wide and 2.0 m (6 ft 6¾ in) high. Unlike typical designs of the era that used a side-mounted door for access, the Ar 232 was furnished with hydraulically powered clamshell-doors on the rear of the bay with a ramp, which permitted cargo to be rolled into the hold. The twin tail configuration tail surfaces were mounted on the end of a long boom to keep the area behind the doors clear so trucks could drive right up to the ramp, much like the 1944-era American Fairchild C-82 Packet of a differing twin boom fuselage configuration. The high-set tail on its "pod-and-boom" configuration fuselage allowed the Ar 232 to be loaded and unloaded faster than other designs. An overhead crane was installed within the cargo bay to assist this process.

The Ar 232 was furnished with a three-piece twin-spar wing, comprising all-through rectangular centrepiece that was attached to a pair of trapezoidal outer wings, each accommodating self-sealing fuel tanks and the main landing gear. The entire rear surface of the wing incorporated Arado's own "travelling flap" design to achieve excellent short-field performance; these flaps were electronically actuated and connected with the ailerons. Further measures to reduce the landing distance included a drogue parachute and rockets. Even when loaded to 16,000 kg (35,270 lb), the Ar 232 could take off in 200 m (656 ft); this was in part achieved via a boundary layer control system. The take-off distance could be further reduced via the use of Starthilfe liquid fuelled monopropellant rocket assist (RATO) jettisonable propulsion units.

Perhaps the most noticeable feature of the Ar 232 was the landing gear. Normal operations from prepared runways used a tricycle gear — a then-novel feature for German military aircraft—but the sideways-retracting main gear's lever-action lower oleo strut suspended arm – carrying the main gear's wheel/tyre unit at the bottoms of the maingears' struts could "break", or kneel, after landing to place the fuselage closer to the ground and thereby reduce the ramp angle. An additional set of eleven smaller, non-retractable twinned wheels per side, mounted along the ventral centreline of the fuselage from just behind the semi-retractable nosewheel aft to just forward of the wing's trailing edge, supported the aircraft once the main landing gear's lever-action lower arm had "knelt", or could be used for additional support when landing on soft or rough airfields. The aircraft was intended to be capable of taxiing at low speeds on its row of small wheels, thus being able to negotiate small obstacles such as ditches up to 1.5 m (5 ft) in width. The appearance of the row of small wheels led to the nickname "millipede". In flight, the main legs fully retracted inwards into the wings, while the fixed support wheels remained exposed and the nose wheel only semi-retracted, with the nosewheel tyre's lowest point while retracted never going above the lowest point of the 22 auxiliary centre-line wheels' tyres.

== Operational history ==
German officials intended for the aircraft to be used in a wide variety of circumstances, specific mentions including North Africa and the Arctic.

In late 1942, in response to the deteriorating situation of the Wehrmacht's 6th Army during the Battle of Stalingrad, it was decided to deploy the first two Ar 232 prototypes to the Eastern Front for the purpose of delivering critical supplies and airlifting casualties.

The first prototype was promptly lost along with its entire crew after the pilot became disoriented. The second prototype was more successful, completing multiple missions in January 1943, typically flying in and out of Stalingrad unhindered. Its crew occasionally opted to avoid airfields when enemy forces were known to be waiting in ambush, instead landing on rough terrain, a feat that would have been impossible for most transport aircraft of its size at the time.

On 17 July 1943, a twin-engined Ar 232 flew from Brandenburg, Germany to Banak, Norway, the northernmost airport in Europe; the flight, which delivered automated weather apparatus, necessitated the fitting of auxiliary fuel tanks. One month later, the aircraft was lost with all onboard due to a single engine failure shortly after takeoff followed by a collision with terrain.

Outside of conventional military logistics, the Ar 232 found numerous uses; Arado made frequent use of the type to transport high priority aviation components.

At least five Ar 232s are believed to have been operated by Kampfgeschwader 200, a secretive special operations unit of the Luftwaffe. Multiple attempts using Ar 232s were made to infiltrate covert agents behind Soviet lines, including a mission under remit of the top secret Operation Zeppelin which intended to assassinate Joseph Stalin in late 1944.

Starting in December 1944, several Ar 232 were directed to fly supplies to a supposed pocket of German military personnel active behind Soviet lines. Despite such flights continuing for months, this effort was entirely fruitless as it was an NKVD deception operation, known as Operation Scherhorn.

Two Ar 232 B-0s were captured by British forces towards the end of the conflict. Multiple test flights of these aircraft were performed by Eric "Winkle" Brown, who reportedly gave the aircraft an excellent report. Subsequently, they were operated for a time by the Royal Air Force on flights between England and Germany as late as 1946.

== Variants ==
Ar 232 V1 & V2
Ar 232A prototypes and research aircraft, powered by two 1,193 kW (1,600 hp) BMW 801A/B engines.

Ar 232 V3 & V4
Ar 232B prototypes and research aircraft, powered by four BMW Bramo 323R-2 Fafnir engines.

Ar 232A
Pre-production aircraft used for operational trials, powered by two BMW801 engines, only ten built.

Ar 232B
The first production aircraft powered by four Bramo 323 Fafnir engines, only ten built as Ar 232B-0.

Ar 232C
A redesigned version using wood for outer wing sections and control surfaces; redesignated Ar 432.

Ar 432
Redesignation of Ar 232C.

Ar 532
Planned enlarged four-engined version of the Ar 432.

Ar 632
Planned enlarged four-engined version of the Ar 432.

== Operators ==
Germany

- Luftwaffe

== Specifications (Ar 232B) ==
Data from Die Deutsche Luftrüstung 1933–1945 Vol.1 – AEG-Dornier

General characteristics

- Crew: 4
- Capacity: 4,500 kg (9,921 lb) payload
- Length: 23.52 m (77 ft 2 in)
- Wingspan: 33.5 m (109 ft 11 in)
- Height: 5.69 m (18 ft 8 in)
- Wing area: 142.6 m^{2} (1,535 sq ft)
- Empty weight: 12,780 kg (28,175 lb)
- Max takeoff weight: 21,150 kg (46,628 lb)
- Powerplant: 4 × BMW Bramo 323R-2 Fafnir nine-cylinder air-cooled radial piston engine, 735 kW (986 hp) each
- Propellers: 3-bladed constant-speed propellers

Performance

- Maximum speed: 308 km/h (191 mph, 166 kn) at 4,000 m (13,000 ft)
- Cruise speed: 290 km/h (180 mph, 160 kn) at 2,000 m (6,600 ft)
- Range: 1,060 km (660 mi, 570 nmi)
- Service ceiling: 6,900 m (22,600 ft)
- Take-off run: 200 m (660 ft) minimum

Armament

- Guns:

- 1 × 13 mm (.51 in) MG 131 machine gun mounted in the nose
- 1 × 20 mm MG 151/20 autocannon mounted in an Elektrische Drehlafette EDL 151 forward dorsal turret
- 1–2 × 13 mm (.51 in) MG 131 machine gun mounted in the rear position
- Up to 8 × 7.92 mm (.312 in) MG 34 machine guns mounted in side windows when transporting infantry

== See also ==
Related lists

- List of military aircraft of Germany
- List of World War II military aircraft of Germany

== Bibliography ==
- Kranzhoff, Jörg Armin (1997). Arado, History of an Aircraft Company. Atglen, Pennsylvania, US: Schiffer Books. ISBN 0-7643-0293-0.
- Munson, Kenneth (2002). German Aircraft Of World War 2 in colour. Atglen, Pennsylvania, USA: Schiffer. ISBN 0-7643-1665-6.
- Nowarra, Heinz J. (1993). Die Deutsche Luftrüstung 1933–1945 Vol.1 – AEG-Dornier (in German). Koblenz, Germany: Bernard & Graefe Verlag. ISBN 978-3-7637-5464-9.
- Sengfelder, Günther (1993). German Aircraft Landing Gear. Atglen, Pennsylvania, US: Schiffer Publishing. ISBN 0-88740-470-7.
