= Siemens-Halske Sh 22 =

1930s German Radial Piston Aircraft engine

Sh 22
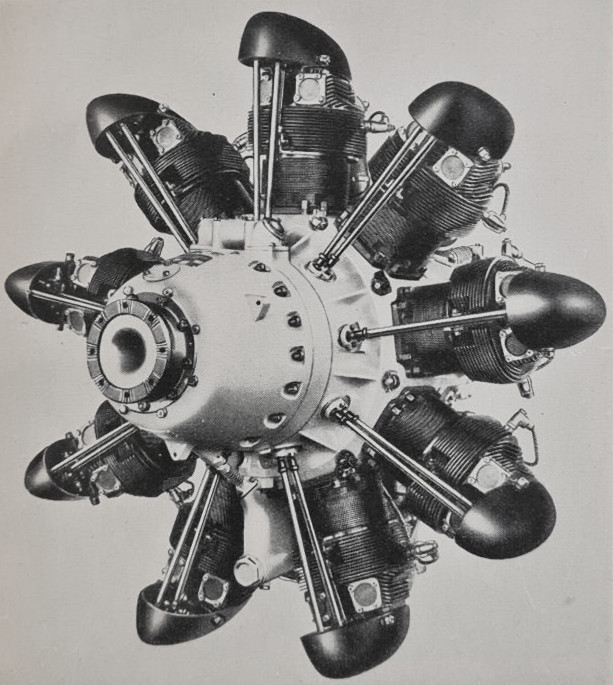
- Type: Radial engine
- National origin: Germany
- Manufacturer: Siemens-Halske
- First run: 1930
- Developed from: Siemens-Halske Sh.21
- Developed into: Bramo 323

The Siemens-Halske Sh 22 (also known as SAM 22) was a nine-cylinder aircraft radial engine manufactured by Siemens & Halske in Germany in the 1930s. Following the reorganization of its manufacturer and change in military nomenclature, the engine became known as the Bramo 322.

It was a result of a series of modifications to the original Bristol Jupiter IV design, which Siemens licensed in 1929. The first modifications were to "Germanize" the dimensions, producing the Sh.20 and Sh.21. The design was then bored out to produce the 950 hp (708 kW) Sh.22 in 1930. Like the Jupiter, the Sh.22 featured a rather "old" looking arrangement with rather prominent valve pushrods on the front of the engine. In the mid-1930s the Reich Air Ministry (RLM) rationalized engine naming, and Bramo was given the 300-block of numbers, the Sh.14 and Sh.22 becoming the Bramo 314 and 322 respectively. The 322 never matured and remained unreliable. It became a base for the more successful Bramo 323.

== Applications ==
- Dornier Do 19 (proposed)
- Fieseler Fi 98
- Heinkel He 46
- Henschel Hs 122
- Junkers W 34
- Junkers Ju 86ab1 prototype

== Specifications (Bramo 322H-2) ==
Data from Aviacionnye motory voennykh vozdushnykh sil inostrannykh gosudarstv, Flugzeug-Typenbuch. Handbuch der deutschen Luftfahrt- und Zubehör-Industrie 1944

=== General characteristics ===
- Type: 9-cylinder single-row supercharged air-cooled radial engine
- Bore: 154 mm (6.06 in)
- Stroke: 160 mm (6.30 in)
- Displacement: 26.82 L (1,636.8 in³)
- Length: 1,285 mm (50.59 in)
- Diameter: 1,324 mm (52.13 in)
- Dry weight: 490 kg (1,080 lb) dry, unequipped

506 kg (1,116 lb) wet, equipped

=== Components ===
- Valvetrain: Two overhead valves per cylinder driven by pushrods and rockers
- Supercharger: Single-speed centrifugal type supercharger running at 6.25:1
- Fuel system: Carburetor
- Fuel type: 87 octane gasoline
- Oil system: pressure fed at 6–8 bar (87–116 psi)
- Cooling system: Air-cooled
- Reduction gear: Farman epicyclic gearing, 0.62:1

=== Performance ===
- Power output:

- 650 PS (641 hp; 478 kW) at 2,150 rpm (5 minutes) at sea level
- 585 PS (577 hp; 430 kW) at 2,080 rpm (30 minutes) at sea level
- 520 PS (513 hp; 382 kW) at 2,000 rpm (max. continuous / cruise) at sea level

- Specific power: 24.21 PS/L (0.39 hp/cu in; 17.81 kW/L)
- Compression ratio: 6.4:1
- Specific fuel consumption: 0.255 kg/PSh (0.570 lb/(hp⋅h); 0.347 kg/kWh) at max continuous
- Oil consumption: 0.005–0.015 kg/PSh (0.011–0.034 lb/(hp⋅h); 0.007–0.020 kg/kWh) at max continuous
- Power-to-weight ratio: 1.333 PS/kg (0.596 hp/lb; 0.980 kW/kg) at cruise
- B.M.E.P.: 9.1 atm (9.2 bar; 134 psi)
