= Junkers Ju 352 =

1943 airlifter series

Ju 352
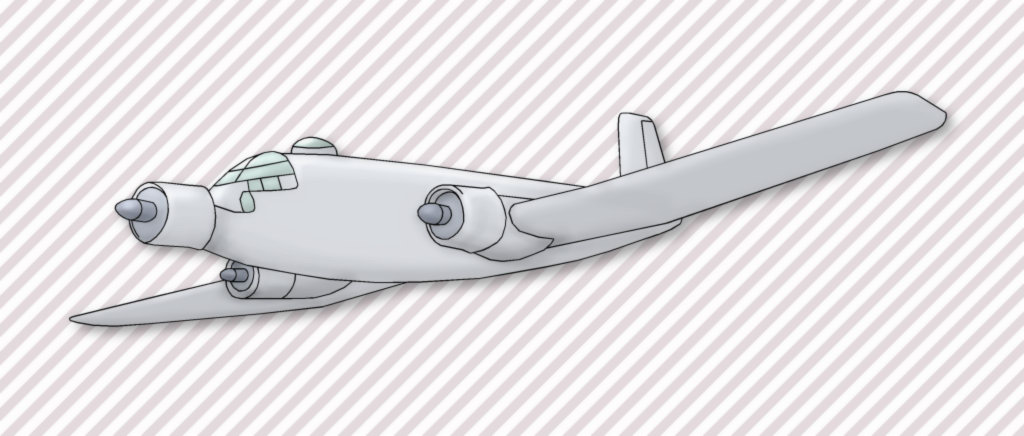

General information
- Type: Transport
- National origin: Nazi Germany
- Manufacturer: Junkers
- Designer: Konrad Eicholtz
- Primary user: Luftwaffe
- Number built: 50

History
- First flight: 18 August 1943
- Developed from: Junkers Ju 252

The Junkers Ju 352 Herkules ("Hercules" in German) was a German World War II transport aircraft that was developed from the Junkers Ju 252.

== Design and development ==
During the late spring of 1942, the Junkers-Dessau project office was instructed by the Reich Air Ministry (RLM) to investigate the possibility of redesigning the structure of the Junkers Ju 252 transport to make maximum use of non-strategic materials, replacing the Junkers Jumo 211F engines of the Ju 252 with Bramo 323R radial engines. The result followed closely the aerodynamic design of the Ju 252 but was an entirely new aircraft. The wing of the Ju 352 was similar in outline to that of the Ju 252 but, mounted further aft on the fuselage, was entirely of wooden construction. The Ju 352 also had a similar Trapoklappe ("Transportklappe", rear loading ramp) to that of the Ju 252. The ramp allowed the loading of vehicles or freight into the cargo hold while holding the fuselage level.

In general, the Ju 352 was considered a major improvement over the original Junkers Ju 52 but noticeably inferior to the Junkers Ju 252. Deliveries of the Ju 352 had only just begun to get into their stride when, during the summer of 1944, the worsening war situation resulted in the decision to abandon further production of transport aircraft. In September the last two Ju 352As rolled off the assembly line, 10 pre-production Ju 352s and 33 production Ju 352s having been manufactured. Several developments of the basic design were proposed before production was halted, these including the Ju 352B with more powerful engines and increased defensive armament.

== Operators ==
Czechoslovakia

- Czechoslovak Air Force (postwar)

Germany

- Luftwaffe

Soviet Union

- One Letov-built aircraft was presented to the Soviet Union in 1946.

== Specifications (Ju 352A-1) ==
Bramo 323 engine on display at the Polish Aviation Museum in Kraków

Data from Junkers aircraft and engines, 1913–1945, German aircraft of the Second World War, The warplanes of the Third Reich

General characteristics

- Crew: 3–4
- Length: 24.2 m (79 ft 5 in)
- Wingspan: 34.2 m (112 ft 2 in)
- Height: 5.74 m (18 ft 10 in)
- Wing area: 121.5 m^{2} (1,308 sq ft)
- Empty weight: 12,500 kg (27,558 lb)
- Gross weight: 19,520 kg (43,034 lb)
- Fuel capacity: 3,255 L (860 US gal; 716 imp gal) in three wing tanks (Note: or 2,910 L (770 US gal; 640 imp gal) in two wing tanks with 1,800 L (480 US gal; 400 imp gal) in auxiliary outer wing tanks)
- Powerplant: 3 × BMW-Bramo 323 R-2 Fafnir 9-cylinder air-cooled radial piston engines, 750 kW (1,000 hp) each at 2,500 rpm for take-off on 'B4' 87 octane fuel (Note: 890 kW (1,200 hp) at 2,600 rpm for emergency boost, or take-off, with 'C3' 96 octane fuel from an auxiliary fuel system)
- Propellers: 3-bladed VDM wooden reversible-pitch constant-speed propellers

Performance

- Maximum speed: 370 km/h (230 mph, 200 kn) at 4,000 m (13,000 ft)
- Cruise speed: 240 km/h (150 mph, 130 kn)
- Range: 1,800 km (1,100 mi, 970 nmi)
- Ferry range: 2,980 km (1,850 mi, 1,610 nmi)
- Service ceiling: 6,000 m (20,000 ft)

Armament

- Guns: ** 1 × 20 mm (0.787 in) MG 151/20 cannon in the 'EDL 131' or 'HD 151/2' dorsal turret
  - 2 × MG 131 machine guns in side windows

== See also ==
Related development

- Junkers Ju 52
- Junkers Ju 252

Aircraft of comparable role, configuration, and era

- Junkers Ju 290

Related lists

- List of aircraft of World War II
- List of military aircraft of Germany
- List of World War II military aircraft of Germany
