= Henschel Hs 126 =

1936 German reconnaissance aircraft

Hs 126
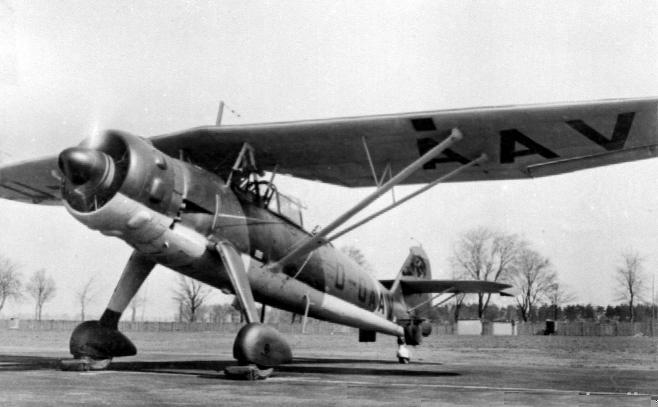

General information
- Type: Reconnaissance
- National origin: Nazi Germany
- Manufacturer: Henschel, AGO
- Status: Retired
- Primary users: Luftwaffe: Bulgarian Air Force; Croatian Air Force; Hellenic Air Force; Spanish Air Force

History
- Manufactured: 1937–1941
- Introduction date: 1937
- First flight: August 1936
- Retired: 1944
- Developed from: Henschel Hs 122

The Henschel Hs 126 was a twin-seat parasol wing reconnaissance and observation aircraft designed and produced by the German aircraft manufacturer Henschel.

The Hs 126 was derived from the Henschel Hs 122. The pilot was seated in a protected cockpit under the parasol wing and the gunner in an open rear cockpit. In the autumn of 1936, the first prototype made its maiden flight; it was soon followed by two more prototypes and a batch of pre-production aircraft. During early 1938, the Hs 126 underwent service evaluation; it was well received for its good short takeoff performance and low-speed flight characteristics, attributes that proved to be frequently useful during its operational history.

The Hs 126 saw combat on numerous fronts, the first occasion being with the Legion Condor contingent that participated in the Spanish Civil War during the late 1930s. It was active on numerous fronts of the Second World War, by which point it had become the principal short-range reconnaissance aircraft of the Luftwaffe. Large numbers of Hs 126s flew during the Invasion of Poland, the Battle of France, and the Invasion of the Soviet Union. On 12 September 1943, a number of Hs 126s were used to tow ten DFS 230 attack gliders from Pratica Di Mare airfield near Rome to the Gran Sasso on a raid to rescue Benito Mussolini. The Royal Hellenic Air Force also operated 16 Hs 126s, which saw action during the Greco-Italian War. It was withdrawn from Luftwaffe service in 1943, by which point the Hs 126 had been superseded by the Fieseler Fi 156 Storch, a general-purpose STOL aircraft, as well as the twin-boom Focke-Wulf Fw 189 Uhu.

== Design and development ==
The origins of the Hs 126 that was derived from the Henschel Hs 122, which did not advance beyond pre-production after flight testing demonstrated the type to offer no meaningful improvement over the existing Heinkel He 46. During 1936, Heinkel's chief designer, Friedrich Nicolaus, commenced work on a more advanced version of the Hs 122; this was later redesignated as the Hs 126. While it retained the same basic configuration of the Hs 122, however, it differed by its redesigned parasol wing, cantilever undercarriage, and a semi-enclosed cockpit. The Hs 126 also featured all-metal stressed skin construction.

In the autumn of 1936, the first prototype conducted its maiden flight, powered by a single Junkers Jumo 210 V12 engine. The first prototype was not entirely up to Luftwaffe. Early flights were made without the cockpit cover. Both the second and third prototypes were powered by the Bramo 323 radial engine; the former was fitted with a supercharger, an enlarged rudder, and twin tailplane bracing struts.

By the end of 1937, a pre-production batch of HS 126A-0s had been completed; these were broadly similar to the third prototype. The first production standard Hs 126A-1s came of Henschel's production line in early 1938; this model differed from the pre-production aircraft mainly in terms of their fitout, being powered by a BMW 132Dc radial and equipped with a single fixed Zeiss camera in the rear fuselage bay as well as provisions for armaments, including a pair of machine guns and a hardpoint bomb rack. During early 1938, several Hs 126s were delivered to the reconniassance Lehrgruppe for service evaluation. During these evaluation flights, it was determined that the type possessed favourable flying characteristics and extremely good short-field performance.

During mid 1939, the improved Hs 126B-1 commenced production; this variant was powered by a Bramo 323 radial and accordingly possessed greater performance when flown at high altitudes along with improved short-field performance, as well as VHF radio apparatus. A total of 257 Hs 126s had been delivered to the Luftwaffe by the start of the Second World War. Production of the Hs 126 was terminated during January 1941.

== Operational history ==
By the time the Hs 126 A-1 was introduced to service with the Luftwaffe in 1938, the re-equipping of reconnaissance formations was already well advanced. The majority of aircraft operated by its short-range reconnaissance units comprised the Heinkel He 45 and Heinkel He 46; in comparison to the Hs 126, both of these aircraft were slower, more vulnerable to ground fire and inclement weather conditions alike, and had limited altitude capability. Accordingly, the Hs 126 had almost entirely replaced both of these aircraft in Luftwaffe service by May 1940.

During late 1938, six Hs 126s were dispatched to Spain, where it replaced the He 45s being flown by the Legion Condor; it saw live combat during the latter portion of the Spanish Civil War. The type's performance in this theatre was reportedly satisfactory; following the end of the civil war, several Hs 126s were transferred to the Spanish Air Force.

By the start of the Second World War in September 1939, the Hs 126 served with Aufkl.Gr 10, 11, 12, 13, 14, 21, 23, 31, 32 und 41. The type was used to great effect during the Invasion of Poland where it proved itself as a reliable observation and liaison aircraft. Virtually every corps of the German Army was working in coordination with its own army cooperation reconnaissance unit. Daylight reconnaissance flights by the Hs 126 were typically flown beneath an altitude of 2,000 meters; at night time, this decreased further to almost tree-top level. Information gathered was typically conveyed during a debriefing after the aircraft's return; however, direct reports using the onboard radio were possible.

The Hs 126 was active during the Invasion of France in May 1940. Numerous aircraft were lost due to interception by Allied fighter aircraft: between 10 and 21 May 1940, 20 Hs 126s were lost alone. Nevertheless, losses of the type in this theatre were not considered to be high.

At the start of the Invasion of the Soviet Union in June 1941, a total of 47 army cooperation squadrons equipped with Hs 126s participated. A higher loss rate was incurred on the Eastern Front, to the extent that fighter aircraft were more commonly used to protect the type during missions. Additionally, the Hs 126 was used in North Africa, such as with the 2./Aufklärungsgruppe (H)/14; it was eventually withdrawn in favour of the Messerschmitt Bf 109 and Messerschmitt Bf 110 towards the end of 1942.

The successor to the Hs 126, the Focke-Wulf Fw 189 Uhu, entered service with the Luftwaffe during 1940. Despite this, the Hs 126 remained the principal short range reconnaissance aircraft with frontline units until early 1942.

Late in the conflict, the Hs 126 was used in glider tug and night ground attack roles. The Hs 126 was withdrawn from virtually all front line use during 1943. On 12 September 1943, a number of Hs 126s were used to tow ten DFS 230 attack gliders from Pratica Di Mare airfield near Rome to the Gran Sasso on a raid to rescue Benito Mussolini. Mussolini had been imprisoned there after being deposed by the Grand Council of Fascism, followed by a decree from the King of Italy. The Henschel was a smaller tow plane compared the usual Junkers Ju 52 three-engine tow plane and struggled to gain altitude to clear the mountains on the way. This led to confusion when the lead Kette of three gliders turned to gain altitude allowing Otto Skorzeny's group of three gliders to assume the lead.

=== Greece ===
At the outbreak of Greco-Italian War of 1940–41, the Royal Hellenic Air Force (Ellinikí Vasilikí Aeroporía, RHAF) had in service 16 Henschels, with 3 Observation Mira, under III Corps, based in Thessaloniki and Veria. Two days after the start of the conflict, on 30 October, there was the first air battle between Italian Regia Aeronautica and the RHAF when some Henschel Hs 126 of 3/2 Flight from 3 Observation Mira took off to locate Italian Army columns. However, they were intercepted and attacked by Fiat CR.42s of 393^{a} Squadriglia. A first Henschel was hit and crashed, killing its observer, Pilot Officer Evanghelos Giannaris, the first Greek aviator to die in the war. A second Hs 126 was downed over Mount Smolikas, killing Pilot Officer Lazaros Papamichail and Sergeant Constantine Yemenetzis.

== Operators ==
Estonia
Estonian Air Force - order cancelled due to annexation
Nazi Germany
Luftwaffe
Kingdom of Greece
Royal Hellenic Air Force
(Spain) Spanish State
Spanish Air Force

== Specifications (Hs 126 B-1) ==

General characteristics

- Crew: Two (pilot and observer/gunner)
- Length: 10.9 m (35 ft 7 in)
- Wingspan: 14.5 m (47 ft 7 in)
- Height: 3.8 m (12 ft 4 in)
- Wing area: 31.6 m^{2} (340 ft^{2})
- Empty weight: 2,030 kg (4,480 lb)
- Loaded weight: 3,090 kg (6,820 lb)
- Powerplant: 1× Bramo 323 nine-cylinder radial engine, 625 kW (838 hp) (850 PS)

Performance

- Maximum speed: 356 km/h at 3,000 m (221 mph at 9,850 ft)
- Range: 998 km (620 mi)
- Service ceiling: 8,530 m (28,000 ft)
- Rate of climb: 550 m/min (1,800 ft/min)
- Wing loading: 97.8 kg/m^{2} (20.1 lb/ft^{2})
- Power/mass: 0.21 kW/kg (0.13 hp/lb)

Armament

- 1 × forward-firing 7.92 mm (.312 in) MG 17 machine gun
- 1 × flexible 7.92 mm (.312 in) MG 15 machine gun in the observer/gunner
- Up to 150 kg (330 lb) of bombs

== See also ==
Aircraft of comparable role, configuration, and era

- ANF Les Mureaux 113
- LWS-3 Mewa
- Westland Lysander
- Levente II
- Mitsubishi Ki-15
- Stinson L-1 Vigilant
- Stinson L-5 Sentinel
- Polikarpov Po-2
- Aeronca L-3 Grasshopper

Related lists

- List of aircraft of World War II
- List of World War II military aircraft of Germany
- List of military aircraft of Germany
