= Douglas O-43 =

US military observation aircraft introduced 1930

O-43
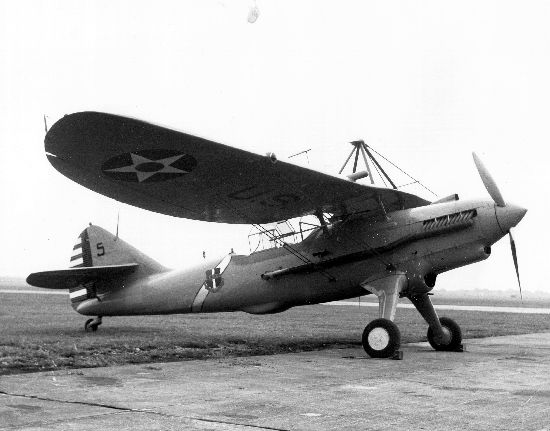

General information
- Type: Observation
- Manufacturer: Douglas Aircraft Company
- Primary user: United States Army Air Corps
- Number built: 24

History
- Introduction date: 1930
- Developed from: Douglas O-31
- Variant: Douglas O-46

The Douglas O-43 was a monoplane observation aircraft used by the United States Army Air Corps.

== Development ==
Five Y1O-31A service-test aircraft were ordered in 1931, and delivered to the USAAC in early 1933 designated Y1O-43. They differed from the final configuration of the O-31A, with a wire-braced parasol wing, and a new fin and rudder. An order for 23 O-43A aircraft was completed during 1934, with a deepened fuselage, which eliminated the need for the ventral bulge under the observer's position. Powered by a single 675 hp Curtiss V-1570-59 inline engine, it also had taller vertical surfaces with an inset rudder similar to the O-31A. The canopy was enlarged, and fully enclosed both cockpits. The O-43 and O-43A served with the USSAC observation squadrons for several years before being assigned to National Guard units, such as the 111th Observation Squadron Brownwood Airfield Texas, 15th Observation Squadron Fort Sill Oklahoma, and 3rd Observation Squadron Langley Field Virginia.

The 24th airframe of the O-43A contract was completed as the XO-46 prototype.

== Specifications (O-43A) ==
Data from McDonnell Douglas aircraft since 1920 : Volume I, United States military aircraft since 1909

General characteristics

- Crew: 2
- Length: 33 ft 11 in (10.34 m)
- Wingspan: 45 ft 11 in (14.00 m)
- Height: 12 ft 3 in (3.73 m)
- Wing area: 334 sq ft (31.0 m^{2})
- Empty weight: 4,135 lb (1,876 kg)
- Gross weight: 5,300 lb (2,404 kg)
- Powerplant: × Curtiss V-1570-59 Conqueror V-12 liquid-cooled piston engine, 675 hp (503 kW)
- Propellers: 3-bladed metal propeller

Performance

- Maximum speed: 190 mph (310 km/h, 170 kn)
- Cruise speed: 163 mph (262 km/h, 142 kn)
- Service ceiling: 22,400 ft (6,800 m)
- Time to altitude: 5,000 ft (1,500 m) in 3 minutes 18 seconds
- Wing loading: 15.8 lb/sq ft (77 kg/m^{2})
- Power/mass: 0.127 hp/lb (0.209 kW/kg)

Armament

- Guns: 1x fixed and 1x flexible .30 cal (7.62 mm) Browning machine gun

== See also ==
Related development

- Douglas O-31
- Douglas O-46

Aircraft of comparable role, configuration, and era

- Breguet 270 Series
- Heinkel He 46
- RWD-14 Czapla

Related lists

- List of military aircraft of the United States
