= Bramo 323 =

1930s German 9-cylinder Radial Aircraft Engine

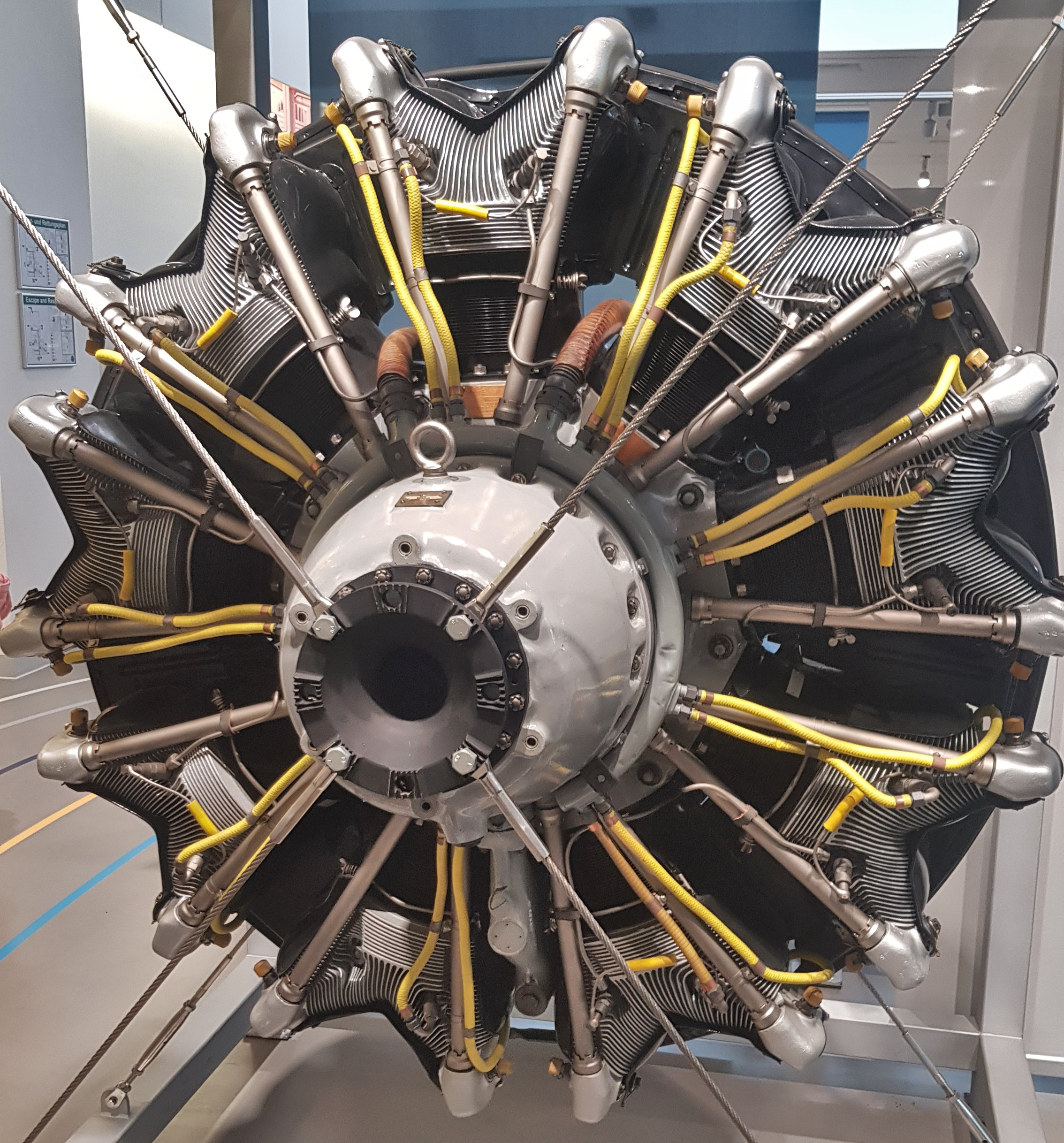
- Bramo 323 engine on display at the MTU Aero Engines museum, Munich
- Type: Radial engine
- Manufacturer: BMW
- First run: 1936
- Major applications: Dornier Do 17; Henschel Hs 126; Focke-Wulf Fw 200; Blohm & Voss BV 222; Focke-Achgelis Fa 223 Drache
- Number built: 5,500
- Developed from: Bristol Jupiter

The Bramo 323 Fafnir is a nine-cylinder radial aircraft engine of the World War II era. Based heavily on Siemens/Bramo's earlier experience producing the Bristol Jupiter under licence, the Bramo 323 saw limited use.

== Design and development ==
Development of the 323 was the result of a series of modifications to the original Jupiter design, which Siemens licensed in 1929. The first modifications produced the Sh.20 and Sh.21. The design was then bored out to produce the 950 hp (708 kW) Sh.22 in 1930. Like the Jupiter, the Sh.22 featured a rather "old" looking arrangement with rather prominent valve pushrods on the front of the engine. In the mid-1930s the Reich Air Ministry (RLM) altered the way in which engines were assigned code names, and Bramo was given the 300-block of numbers. Therefore, the Sh.14 and Sh.22 became the 314 and 322, respectively. The 322 never matured and remained unreliable.

The team continued work on the basic design, adding fuel injection and a new supercharger. The resulting Bramo 323 was just under 27 L in displacement, and produced 900 PS at 2,500 rpm for takeoff, improving slightly to 1,000 PS at 3,100 m (10,200 ft). The reduced power at sea level was inevitable for engines with single-speed, mechanically-driven superchargers when they were regulated to a constant maximum boost pressure below their critical altitude.

The Fafnir powered a number of German prewar designs, including the Focke-Wulf Fw 200, Henschel Hs 126, Dornier Do 24 and Dornier Do 17, as well as the Focke Achgelis Fa 223 Drache helicopter. Its fairly poor fuel economy kept it from more widespread use, and most designs chose the similar BMW 132 instead, whose specific fuel consumption varied between 220 and 240 g/(kW•h) depending on model, whereas the early versions of the Fafnir got about 255 g/(kW•h), a poor figure for the era. The C/Ds, where the supercharger used less power, improved this to 230 g/(kW•h), but were only useful at lower altitudes.

BMW bought Bramo in 1939 and continued production to supply the small number of designs that already used it, notably the Do 17. The naming at this point becomes somewhat confusing, with BMW, Bramo and Fafnir being used almost interchangeably depending on the source. 5,500 were produced before the lines were shut down in 1944.

The original 323 design was produced in A and B models, differing in the direction they turned. The engines were intended to be installed in A/B pairs, thereby eliminating engine torque across a twin-engine aircraft. The similar C and D models featured a lower supercharger gearing for better performance at lower altitudes, improving takeoff power to 1,000 PS, but reducing the critical altitude.

The final versions, P, R and T, featured a two-speed supercharger for better all-around performance. This allowed it to generate 1,000 PS at sea level as in the C/D models, but improved altitude performance considerably, delivering 940 PS at 4,000 m (13,000 ft). The R-2 subtype added MW 50 water-methanol injection for added low-altitude performance, boosting power to 1,200 PS at 2,600 rpm.

== Variants ==
323A
(RH rotation)
323B
same as A but opposite rotation.(LH rotation)
323C
lower powered supercharge 1,000 PS (986 hp; 735 kW) for take-off. (RH rotation)
323D
same as C but opposite rotation. (LH rotation)
323J
(RH rotation)
323M
(RH rotation)
323P
2-speed supercharger:- 940 PS (927 hp; 691 kW) at 4,000 m (13,000 ft)
323R

323R-2
with 'C3' 96 octane fuel injection 1,100 PS (1,085 hp; 809 kW) at 2,600 rpm

323T

== Applications ==
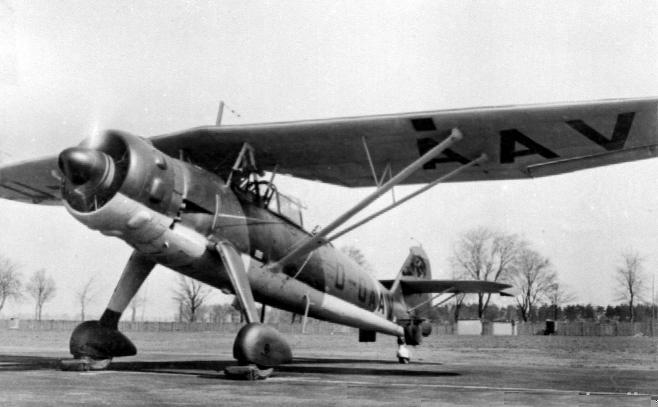
Henschel Hs 126

- Arado Ar 196
- Arado Ar 232
- Blohm & Voss BV 222
- Dornier Do 17
- Dornier Do 24
- Focke Achgelis Fa 223
- Focke-Wulf Fw 200
- Henschel Hs 126
- Junkers Ju 352

== Specifications (BMW-Bramo 323J) ==
Data from Flugzeug-Typenbuch. Handbuch der deutschen Luftfahrt- und Zubehör-Industrie 1944

=== General characteristics ===
- Type: 9-cylinder supercharged air-cooled radial engine
- Bore: 154 mm (6.06 in)
- Stroke: 160 mm (6.30 in)
- Displacement: 26.82 L (1,636.7 cu in)
- Length: 1,417 mm (55.8 in)
- Diameter: 1,388 mm (54.6 in)
- Dry weight: 545 kg (1,202 lb) unequipped

562 kg (1,239 lb) equipped

=== Components ===
- Valvetrain: single exhaust and inlet overhead valves driven by pushrods and rockers
- Supercharger: supercharger driven at 11.4:1, rated to 4,200 m (13,780 ft)
- Fuel system: Fuel injection
- Fuel type: 87 Octane petrol
- Cooling system: Air-cooled

=== Performance ===
- Power output:

- 1,000 PS (986 hp; 735 kW) at 2,800 rpm (max) at 3,100 m (10,171 ft)
- 900 PS (888 hp; 662 kW) for takeoff at 2,500 rpm (1 minute) at sea level
- 730 PS (720 hp; 537 kW) at 2,350 rpm (5 minutes) at sea level
- 660 PS (651 hp; 485 kW) at 2,250 rpm (30 minutes) at sea level
- 585 PS (577 hp; 430 kW) at 2,100 rpm (max. continuous) at sea level
- 515 PS (508 hp; 379 kW) at 2,000 rpm (cruise) at sea level

- Specific power: 27.21 PS/L (0.44 hp/cu in; 20.01 kW/L)
- Compression ratio: 6.4:1
- Specific fuel consumption: 0.348 kg/PS/h (0.778 lb/hp/h; 0.473 kg/kW/h) at max continuous
- B.M.E.P.: 9.37 atm (9.49 bar; 137.7 psi)
- Power-to-weight ratio: 1.33 PS/kg (0.60 hp/lb; 0.98 kW/kg)

== See also ==
- List of aircraft engines
