= Douglas O-31 =

US military observation aircraft introduced 1930

O-31
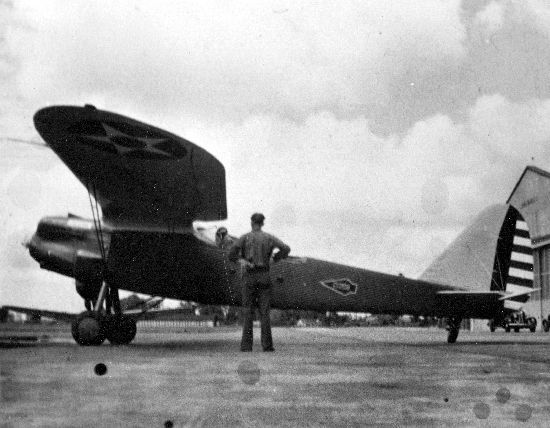
- XO-31

General information
- Type: Observation
- Manufacturer: Douglas Aircraft Company
- Primary user: United States Army Air Corps
- Number built: 13

History
- Manufactured: 1930-1933
- Introduction date: 1930
- Developed into: Douglas O-43

The Douglas O-31 was the Douglas Aircraft Company's first monoplane observation straight-wing aircraft used by the United States Army Air Corps.

== Development ==
Anxious to retain its position as chief supplier of observation aircraft to the USAAC, Douglas developed a proposal for a high-wing monoplane successor to the O-2. A contract was signed on January 7, 1930 for two XO-31 prototype aircraft, the first of them being flown in December of the same year. A fabric-covered gull-wing monoplane, the XO-31 had a slim corrugated dural-wrapped fuselage, similar to the Thomas-Morse O-19, carrying a tandem arrangement of open cockpits for the pilot and observer. It had one 675 hp (503 kW) Curtiss GIV-1570-FM Conqueror V-12 engine and fixed landing gear with provision for large wheel fairings.

The XO-31 suffered from directional instability and experiments were made with various fins, auxiliary fins, and rudder shapes, in an effort to cure the problem. The second aircraft was completed as the YO-31, with a geared Curtiss V-1570-7 Conqueror engine and an enlarged fin, 3" longer cowling, and a two-blade, dextrorotatory propeller. Four YO-31A aircraft delivered during early 1932 were modified radically with an elliptical wing planform, a new tail assembly, a smooth semimonocoque fuselage, three-blade propeller, and a canopy over the cockpits. The aircraft appeared with a variety of tail units, the final version (five built) designated O-31A featured a very pointed fin with an inset rudder. The single YO-31B was an unarmed staff transport and the sole YO-31C converted from YO-31A had cantilever main landing gear, and a ventral bulge in the fuselage, which enabled the observer to operate his single 0.3-in (7.62 mm) machine-gun more effectively from a standing position.

Five Y1O-31C service-test aircraft were ordered in 1931, and delivered to the USAAC in early 1933 designated Y1O-43. They differed from the final configuration of the O-31A, with a wire-braced parasol wing, and a new fin and rudder.

== Variants ==
_{Data from: "U.S. Army Aircraft 1908-1946" by James C. Fahey, 1946, 64pp.}

XO-31
two built, Curtiss V-1570-25 Conqueror engine
YO-31
revised XO-31, length increased to 33 ft 5 in (10.19 m), Curtiss V-1570-7 engine
YO-31A
five built, re-designated O-31A, fuselage construction changed to a built-up semimonocoque structure of flat sheets, length increased to 33 ft 11 in (10.34 m), Curtiss V-1570-53 engine
YO-31B
one built, re-designated O-31B, Curtiss V-1570-29 engine
YO-31C
YO-31A with cantilever gear, Curtiss V-1570-53 engine
Y1O-31C
five built, wingspan increased to 45 ft 11 in (14 m), became the Y1O-43, Curtiss V-1570-53 engine

== Specifications (YO-31C) ==
Data from McDonnell Douglas aircraft since 1920 : Volume I, United States military aircraft since 1909

General characteristics

- Crew: 2
- Length: 34 ft 5 in (10.49 m)
- Wingspan: 45 ft 11 in (14.00 m)
- Height: 11 ft 6.75 in (3.5243 m)
- Wing area: 339.9 sq ft (31.58 m^{2})
- Empty weight: 3,888 lb (1,764 kg)
- Gross weight: 4,982 lb (2,260 kg)
- Powerplant: 1 × Curtiss GIV-1570-FM Conqueror (V-1570-53)

Performance

- Maximum speed: 195 mph (314 km/h, 169 kn) at sea level
- Cruise speed: 160 mph (260 km/h, 140 kn)
- Range: 260 mi (420 km, 230 nmi)
- Service ceiling: 22,700 ft (6,900 m)
- Rate of climb: 1,515 ft/min (7.70 m/s)
- Time to altitude: 10,000 ft (3,000 m)7 minutes 12 seconds
- Wing loading: 14.6 lb/sq ft (71 kg/m^{2})
- Power/mass: 0.12 hp/lb (0.20 kW/kg)

Armament

- Guns: 1 fixed and 1 flexible 0.30 cal (7.62 mm) Browning machine gun
