= Easterbrook =

Easterbrook is a surname from Devon, England. Notable people with the surname include:

- Arthur Easterbrook (1893–1952), World War I flying ace and WW2 Brigadier General
- Don Easterbrook, American geologist
- Edmund P. Easterbrook (1865–1933), 2nd Chief of Chaplains of the US Army
- Frank H. Easterbrook (born 1948), American judge
- Giles Easterbrook (1949–2021), composer and music publisher
- Gregg Easterbrook (born 1953), writer
- Leslie Easterbrook, actress
- Ronald Easterbrook (1931–2009), Convicted armed robber
- Steve Easterbrook (born 1967), British businessman, ex-CEO of McDonald's
- Steve M. Easterbrook, Canadian academic
- Syd Easterbrook (1905–1975), English golfer

== See also ==
- James Easterbrooks (c. 1757–1842), Canadian politician
- Esterbrook, Wyoming
- Dude Esterbrook, American baseball player
