= 1st Reconnaissance Squadron =

1st Reconnaissance Squadron

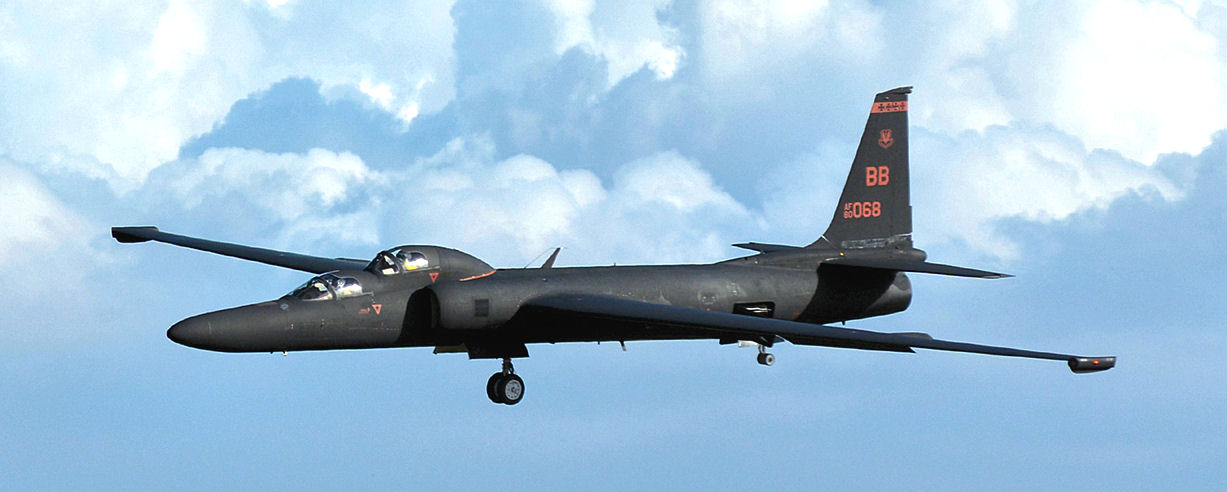
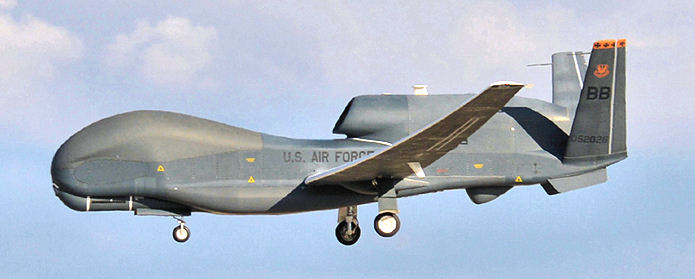
- Lockheed U-2S 80-1068 Northrop Grumman RQ-4B Global Hawk 05-2026
- Active: 5 March 1913 – present (113 years, 2 months)
- Country: United States
- Branch: United States Air Force
- Role: Aerial reconnaissance
- Size: Squadron
- Part of: Air Combat Command: Sixteenth Air Force; 9th Reconnaissance Wing; 9th Operations Group
- Garrison/HQ: Beale Air Force Base, California
- Engagements: Mexico 1916–1917 World War I – Western Front World War II – American Theater World War II – Asiatic–Pacific Theater

- Decorations: Distinguished Unit Citation; Presidential Unit Citation Air Force Meritorious Unit Award Air Force Outstanding Unit Award with Combat "V" Device; Air Force Outstanding Unit Award

Commanders
- Notable commanders: Benjamin Delahauf Foulois

Insignia
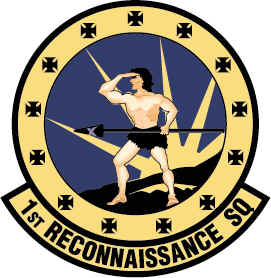
- 1st Reconnaissance Squadron emblem (Note: Approved 14 July 1931. Description: A brown cave man wearing a black breech clout, standing on a black mound, looking to dexter with right hand shading his eyes, holding spear horizontally in front of a rising sun, against a blue background; all within a green bordered gold annulet bearing thirteen black crosses pattée.)

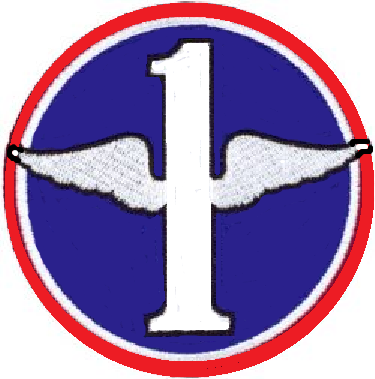
- 1st Observation Squadron emblem (1920s)

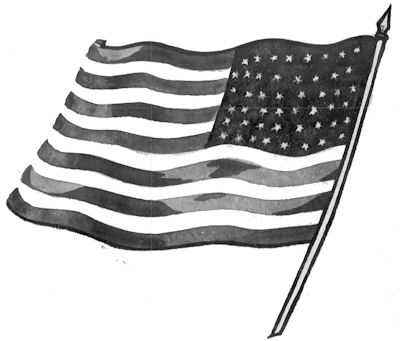
- 1st Aero Squadron emblem
- Tail code: BB

Aircraft flown
- Reconnaissance: Lockheed U-2S; RQ-4 Global Hawk (UAV)
- Trainer: T-38 Talon; Lockheed TU-2S

The 1st Reconnaissance Squadron is a United States Air Force squadron, assigned to the 9th Operations Group, Beale Air Force Base, California.

The 1st Reconnaissance Squadron is the United States military's oldest flying unit, first established on 5 March 1913. The squadron has maintained an unbroken heritage of over a century from its founding. Originally organized in anticipation of a potential breach in security along the border between the United States and Mexico, General John J. Pershing directed the 1st Aero Squadron to become the first tactical aviation unit to participate in American military action. The 1st RS has flown 47 different aircraft while being stationed worldwide at 52 locations, including 4 stints at sea.

Since 1922 the 1st Squadron has been associated with the 9th Bomb Group and the USAF 9th Reconnaissance Wing, where it continues to be an active flying training unit operating the Lockheed U-2 and the RQ-4 Global Hawk surveillance aircraft.

== Overview ==
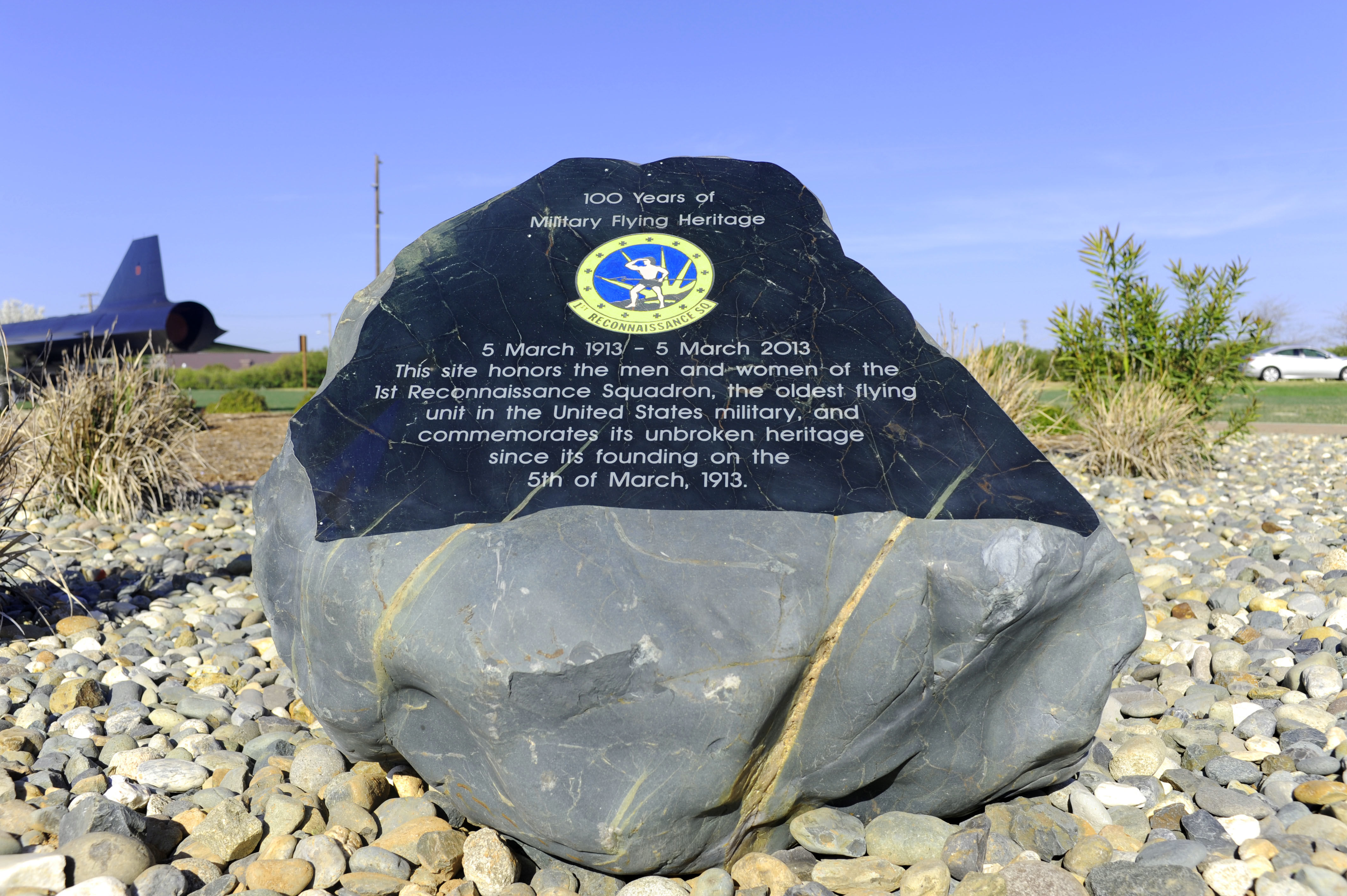
This plaque was unveiled 8 March 2013, on Beale Air Force Base, celebrating the 100-year anniversary of the 1st Reconnaissance Squadron.

The 1st Reconnaissance Squadron is responsible for training all High-Altitude Intelligence, Surveillance, and Reconnaissance aircrew for the U-2S Dragon Lady and the RQ-4 Global Hawk. Aircrew members consist of pilots and mission planners for the U-2S, and pilots and sensor operators for the RQ-4. Training for all U-2S pilots includes additional qualification in the T-38A Talon, the companion trainer to the U-2S.

The squadron flies over 5,400 U-2S/T-38A training hours and 2,400 RQ-4 combat support hours annually. This flight training program produces 24 U-2S pilots, 48 RQ-4 pilots, and 36 RQ-4 sensor operators annually.

== History ==
=== Origins ===
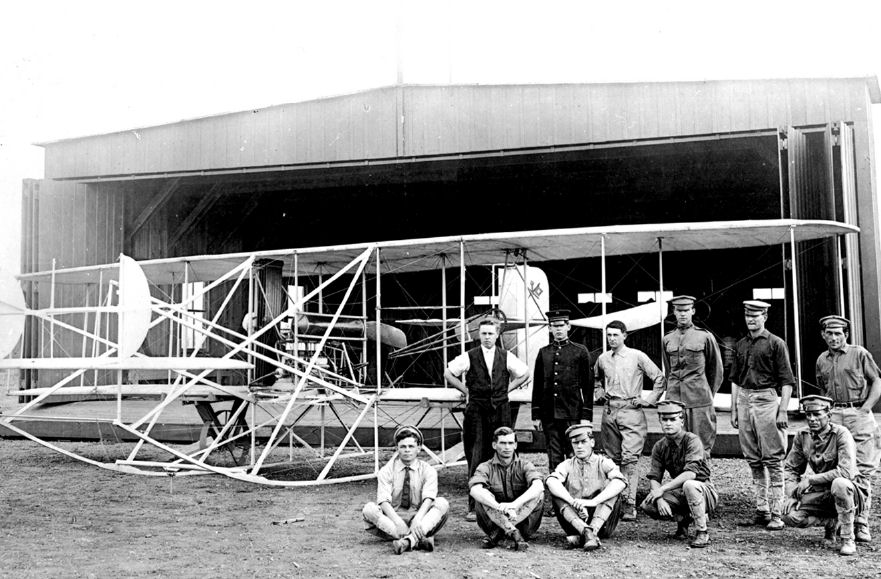
Signal Corps Plane No. 1 and crew at Fort Sam Houston, Texas, in May 1910.

Mexico's revolutionary violence early in 1913 caused President Wilson to order partial mobilization, and the army formed the "Second Division" at Texas City, Texas. On 25 February, the Chief Signal Officer, Brig. Gen. George P. Scriven, ordered the airplanes, personnel, and equipment then at Augusta, Georgia, to Texas City; and on 5 March, the army designated the small command as the 1st Aero Squadron (Provisional). The unit consisted of nine airplanes, nine officers, and fifty-one enlisted men organized into two companies, and it spent much of its time practicing cross-country flying and operating from rough terrain, skills that would be of great value in the field. It was soon clear that the Second Division would not become involved in a fight.

By June 1913, the squadron had transferred to the new Signal Corps Aviation School at San Diego, California. In December, the 1st Aero Squadron dropped the "provisional" from its title, making it the U.S. Army's first regular air squadron.

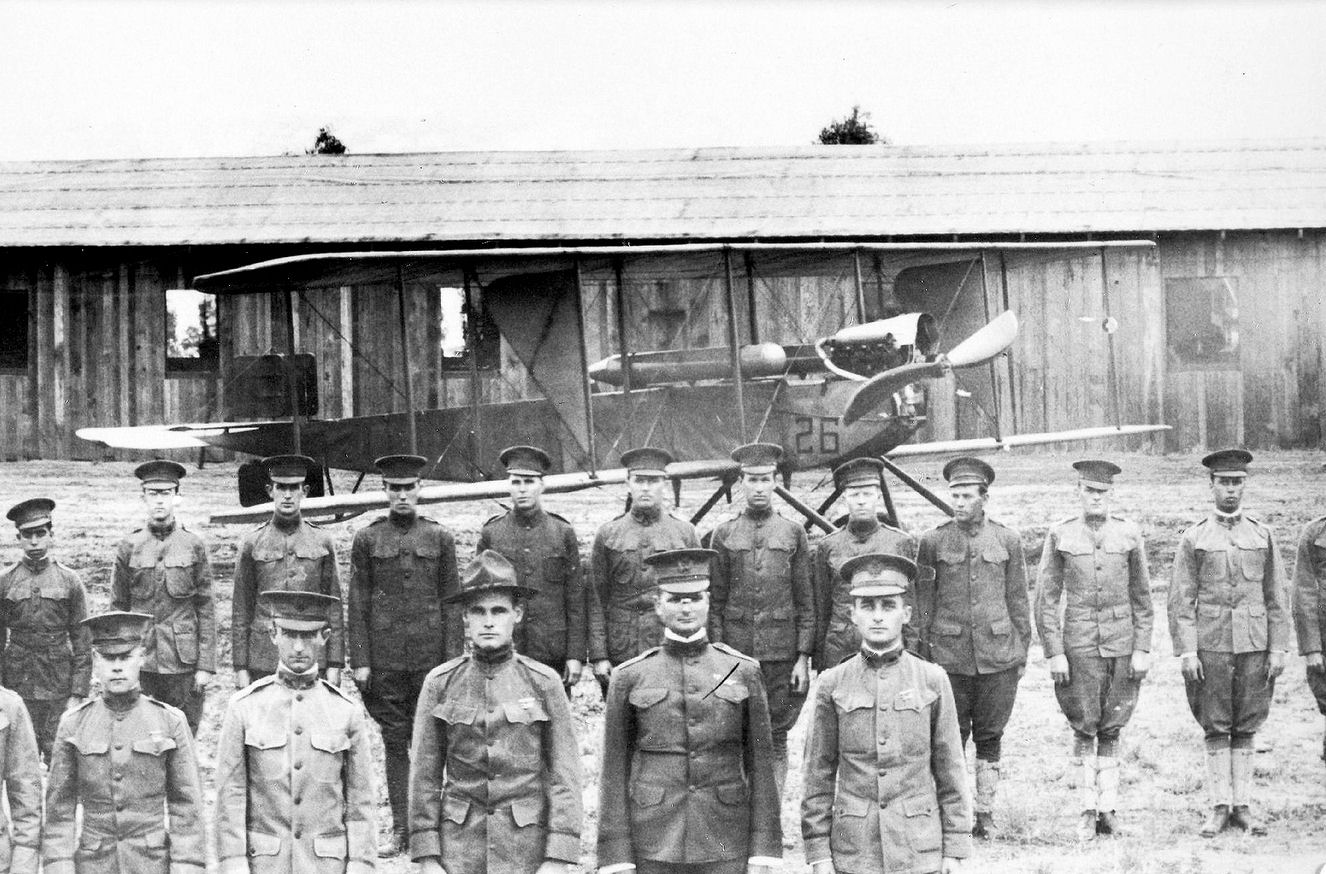
Burgess Model H No. 26 at North Island California. 1915

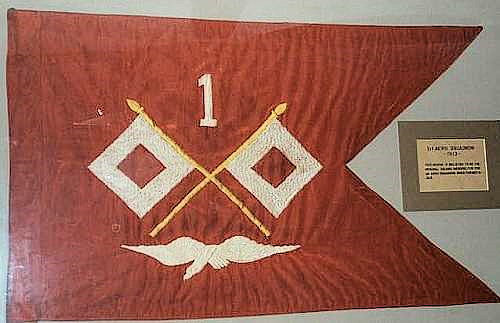
1st Aero Squadron Standard – 1913. This is believed to be the original Standard (guidon) ordered for the US 1st Aero Squadron.

The Chief Signal officer approved a table of organization for the unit on 7 January 1914, consisting of two companies of eight officers and 45 enlisted men each, and eight aircraft. At the time of its formation, 1st Company consisted of Burgess Model H tractors S.C. No. 9, 24, 25, and 26; while 2nd Company consisted of Curtiss aircraft S.C. No. 2 (a Curtiss Model D), 6 (Curtiss Model E), 22 (Curtiss Model G) and 23 (an aircraft assembled from spare parts for the Curtiss E). The initial composition of the squadron was short three pilots. (According to the U.S. Air Force Historical Research Agency, during this period other training aircraft included at least one example of the Wright Model B, Burgess F, Burgess I-Scout, Burgess J-Scout, and the Martin T.)

Detachments of the 1st Aero Squadron returned to Fort Crockett, Texas, on 30 April 1914 when the Tampico Affair threatened war again, although they arrived too late to be transshipped to Mexico and their aircraft were never uncrated. The 1st Aero Squadron had made its first flights at Fort Sill on 10 August, but accomplished little flying in the next few weeks, as manufacturing problems in the airplanes and engines quickly appeared. A fatal crash occurred on 12 August 1915 followed by a second crash on 5 September after protests about its safety were overruled by squadron commander Capt. Benjamin D. Foulois.

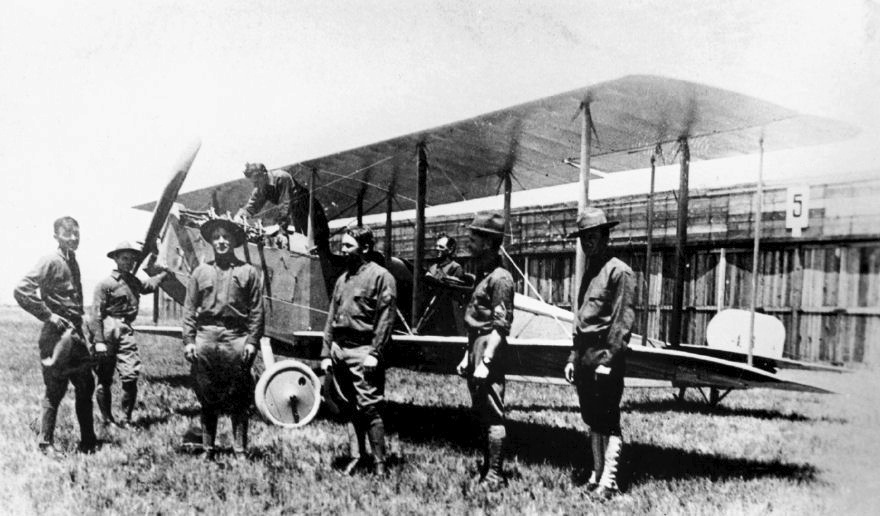
The first of the new 1st Aero Squadron Curtiss JN–2s at the Signal Corps Aviation School, North Island California

=== Punitive expedition ===
During the Mexican Revolution, hundreds of Pancho Villa's horsemen crossed the United States border and raided Columbus, New Mexico on 9 March 1916. The town was looted and burned, and 17 Americans were killed.

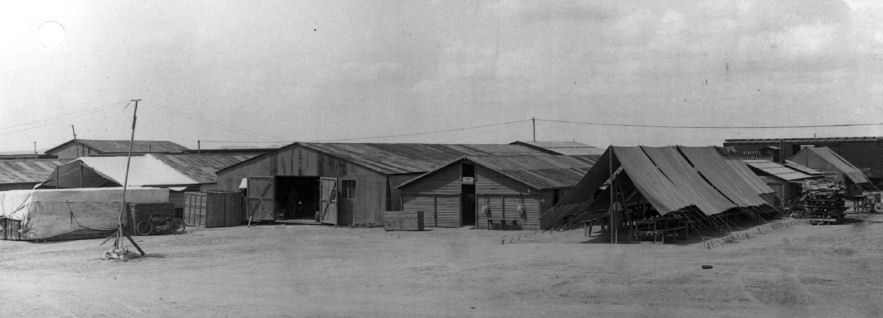
The 1st Aero Squadron's facilities at Columbus, New Mexico, 1916

President Wilson immediately asked President Carranza of Mexico for permission to send United States troops into his country, and Carranza reluctantly gave permission "for the sole purpose of capturing the bandit Villa." Wilson then ordered General John J. Pershing to "pursue and disperse," the forces commanded by Villa. In his orders to Southern Department commanding general Frederick Funston, United States Secretary of War Newton D. Baker instructed him to have the 1st Aero Squadron moved to Columbus to provide liaison and aerial reconnaissance for Pershing's headquarters.

Despite the shortcomings, the squadron was ordered to send all available aircraft, pilots and personnel to support Pershing. There would be neither replacements nor a reserve. The squadron disassembled its aircraft and left Fort Sam Houston in San Antonio, Texas, by train on 13 March. Two days later it arrived in Columbus with eight Curtiss JN-3 aircraft, 11 pilots and 82 enlisted men and established an airfield to the southeast of the town. From Columbus, the squadron flew its first reconnaissance sortie on 16 March.

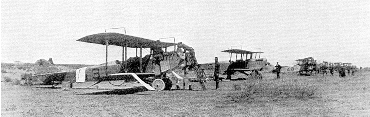
1st Aero Squadron on the Mexican US border, 19 or 20 March 1916. The third plane in line, S.C. No. 48, crashed late on the morning of 20 March in Mexico.

On 19 March 1916, the squadron received orders to fly into Mexico and report without delay to his headquarters at Casas Grandes. Shortly after 17:00, the planes took off but one returned almost immediately with engine problems. Darkness proved a formidable challenge and none of the aircraft completed the movement on the first day. Four landed near La Ascension, about halfway to destination, and completed the flight the next morning, although one was a total loss in a landing accident. Another aircraft overflew Casas Grandes in the dark and landed in the desert, where it was destroyed by vandals. Two others landed in the desert short of Casas Grandes, where one continued on the next morning, but the last did not arrive until repairs were completed to it on 26 March. Pershing had only five operational airplanes available for immediate duty.

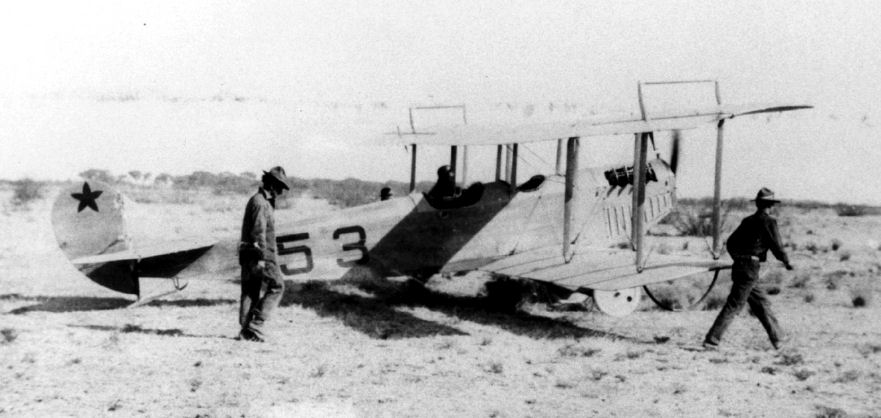
: Lt. Carleton G. Chapman in 1st Aero Squadron Curtiss JN-3 Signal Corps No. 53 preparing to takeoff at Casas Grande, Mexico.

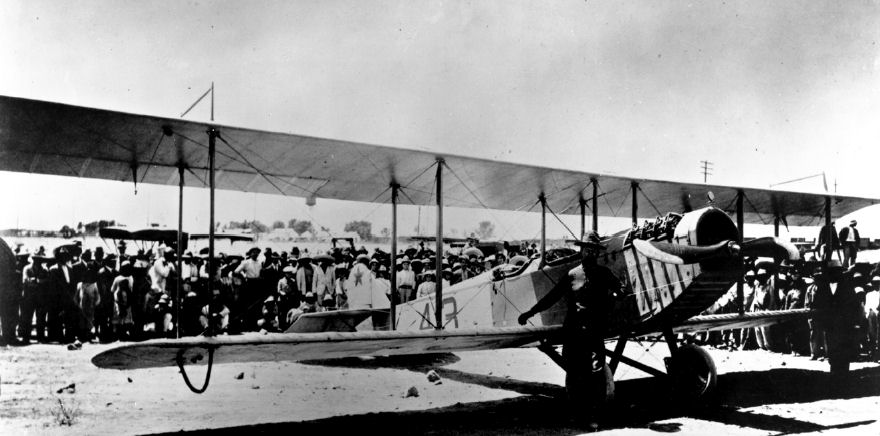
A cool Lt. Herbert A. Dargue posing in front of 1st Aero Squadron Curtiss JN-3 Signal Corps No. 43 at Chihuahua City, Mexico He and the airplane have just been stoned by a hostile crowd. Dargue had the photographer pose him as long as possible to avoid further mob violence. The mob did not attack while the camera was in use.

It was found that the squadron's 90 horsepower (67 kW) Curtiss JN-3 airplanes were unable to climb over the 10,000 to 12,000-foot (3,700 m) mountains of the region or overcome the high winds of the passes through them. Dust storms frequently grounded the aircraft and wooden propellers de-laminated in the heat. Using its base in Columbus, the 1st Aero Squadron concentrated on carrying mail and dispatches between Columbus and Pershing's Army columns moving south into Mexico. During the last few days of March, the squadron's planes flew approximately 20 missions with messages for the various columns of Pershing's command. By 20 April, only two airplanes remained in service (neither flyable, and both were destroyed), four having crashed and two others scavenged to provide replacement parts. After the losses, the remaining two JN-3s and the rest of the squadron were ordered back to Columbus for refitting.

While the Punitive Expedition searched for Villa and his men, events in the United States provided some help for the 1st Aero Squadron. Secretary of War Baker was following the squadron's activities closely. On the following day, Congress took action to deal with the deficiencies reported from Mexico. On 31 March, it passed the Urgent Deficiency Act, which provided the army with $500,000 for the immediate purchase of twenty-four airplanes, eight for the 1st Aero Squadron. The initial practical result of this legislation was the delivery of four Curtiss N-8s, S.C. Nos. 60–63, which were essentially variants of the JN–3 with a different wing and airfoil and powered by a 90 hp engine. Tests conducted over the next six days verified that these were incapable of meeting the operational conditions in Mexico. On 1 May, it was concluded that the Curtiss N–8 was too slow and under-powered and the landing gear too weak for rough terrain. The squadron packed up the N–8s and shipped them to the Signal Corps Aviation School at San Diego.

On the same day, the first of twelve Curtiss R-2s reached Columbus. The R–2 was a larger, modified version of the original Curtiss Model N powered by a 160 hp engine. However, the 1st Aero Squadron spent the next three months fighting problems with the new airplanes. The catalogue of deficiencies was enormous and inexcusable. Further, most of the airplanes were poorly constructed from shoddy materials. Clearly, Curtiss had lost control of quality at the manufacturing plant. These critical deficiencies had repercussions in Washington, D.C. and reports on the R–2s had stirred up the Signal Office about the Curtiss Company's miserable performance.

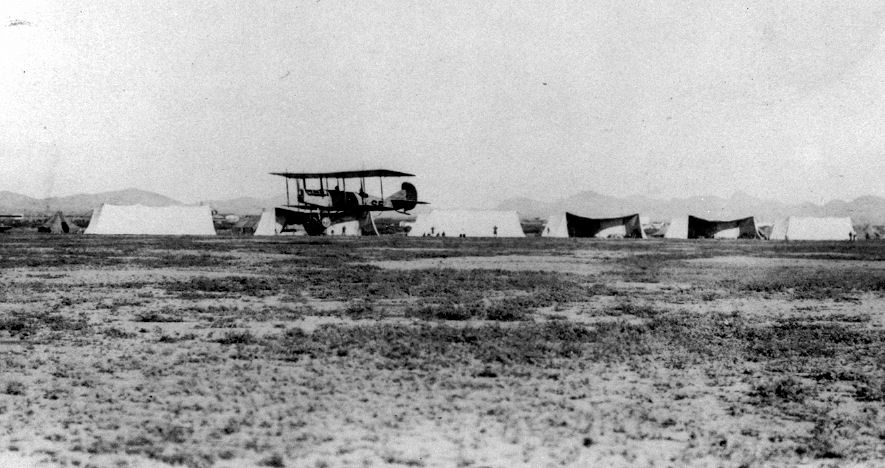
A 1st Aero Squadron Curtiss R–2 takes off at Columbus, New Mexico. Note the hangar tents to the rear.

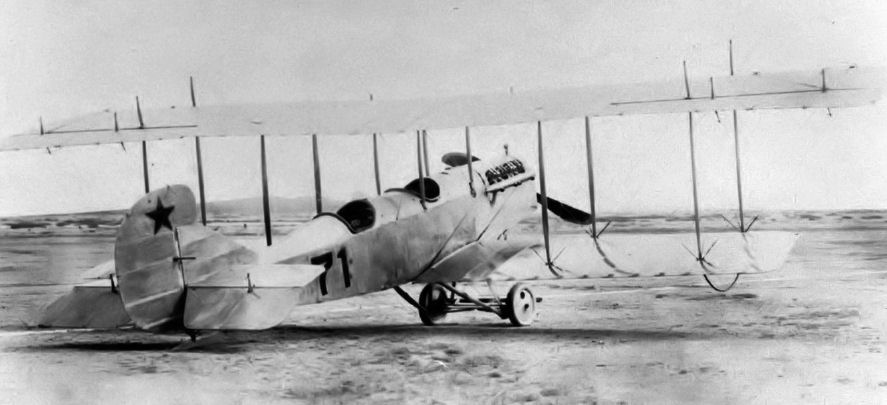
A 1st Aero Squadron Curtiss R–2, Signal Corps No. 71, at Columbus, New Mexico.

Beyond wrestling with the R–2s and propellers, the 1st Aero Squadron experimented with a variety of other airplanes and aviation equipment. In addition to the R–2s, the squadron received three Standard H–2s, six Curtiss twin-engine JNs, about seven Curtiss JN–4 "Jennies", and other planes from Martin, Sturtevant, Thomas, and LWF. All told, counting the four Curtiss N–8s, the 1st Aero Squadron received fifty-one airplanes at Columbus by 6 April 1917. The 1st Aero Squadron remained at Columbus, with a detachment in Mexico, until Pershing withdrew the Punitive Expedition from Mexico in early February 1917.

The Punitive Expedition is often portrayed as a failure because Pershing's force failed to capture or kill Pancho Villa. This view is something less than the truth. While Pershing's mission was to catch Villa if possible, Pershing's orders from the War Department had directed him only to pursue and disperse the band of raiders that had attacked Columbus, not to eliminate Villa. In addition to the 69 bandits captured and killed during the fighting in Columbus on 9 March, the Punitive Expedition had killed 248 and taken 19 prisoners by 31 July.

The mission of the 1st Aero Squadron during the Punitive Expedition was primarily one of communications and observation, and during the first phase of the Punitive Expedition the 1st Aero Squadron was of considerable help in enabling Pershing to keep in touch with his thinly spread, fast-moving troopers. The squadron also performed several reconnaissance missions, and although these failed to locate enemy forces, that information in itself was important for the commander to know. The second phase of the Punitive Expedition was probably most important for the squadron, because the officers and men gained experience and knowledge by experimenting with a variety of airplanes and aviation equipment.

The deficient, unsuitable airplanes the 1st Aero Squadron took to Mexico also served as a warning for the future. The U.S. aviation industry at the end of 1916 consisted of fewer than a dozen firms, only a handful of which—Curtiss, Martin, Wright, and Sturtevant, for example—had produced a reasonable number of airplanes. 1st Aero Squadron remained at Columbus until August 1917, when it was ordered to France after the United States' entry into World War I.

=== World War I ===
1st Aero Squadron
- Operations: Pancho Villa Expedition; 15 March 1916 – 7 February 1917 World War I I Corps Observation Group; Western Front, France: 8 April – 11 November 1918: Total Sorties: 395; Combat Missions: 262; Enemy Combats: 94; Killed: 17; Wounded: 1; Missing: 1 (POW); Aircraft lost: 21; Occupation of the Rhineland; 21 November 1918 – 12 May 1919
- Victories: Enemy Aircraft shot down: 13; Enemy Balloons shot down: 0; Total Enemy Aircraft Destroyed: 13; Air Aces: 2: Lt. Arthur E. Easterbrook, 5*; Lt. William P. Erwin, 8**; * Observer/Gunner ** Pilot (Shared with Observer/Gunner)

When the United States declared war on Germany on 6 April 1917, the 1st Aero Squadron was still based at Columbus, New Mexico. The Army ordered the 1st Aero Squadron to Fort Jay, New York City, to accompany the 1st Division to France.

There was an advanced company of the 1st Aero Squadron which flew under French direction as reconnaissance for French troops prior to the USA officially entering the war. Henry Gabriel of Rocky River, Ohio was one of those first pilots.

The squadron departed on 5 August 1917 on a troop train, arriving at Jersey City, New Jersey on the 9th. It embarked on the Red Star Liner SS Lapland on 13 August for its trans-Atlantic crossing, reaching Liverpool, England on 1 September without incident. The squadron then boarded a train for Southampton, and crossed the channel the next day, resting at British Rest Camp No. 2, Le Havre, France.

==== Combat in France ====
After a few days rest in Le Havre, the squadron moved to the French depot and airdrome of Étampes-Mondesir, then to the French aviation school at Avord. At the Avord Aerodrome, training was begun on 13 September on several types of aircraft: Blériot Penguin, a flightless aircraft that gave the sensation of flying while still on the ground; then Nieuport 30, 23 and 10s. After two weeks at Avord and completing the training course, the 1st Aero Squadron moved to Issoudun Aerodrome in central France on 20 September. However, the training facilities there were not yet ready and the squadron was moved on 19 October to Amanty Airdrome in Lorraine, where the squadron was prepared for active service on the front. On 5 February, Stephen W. Thompson, a member of the squadron, became the first American in the US military to shoot down an enemy aircraft. He was on a bombing mission with a French squadron. At Amanty, the squadron was equipped with Avion de Reconnaissance 1 (AR 1) trainers. Classes were held in radio and machine-gun work and ground training was conducted by French officers. By the end of February 1918, the AR 1 trainers were replaced by SPAD S.XIA.2s. While at the training school, a number of squadron observers were sent to the front line trenches and to other French squadrons for training.

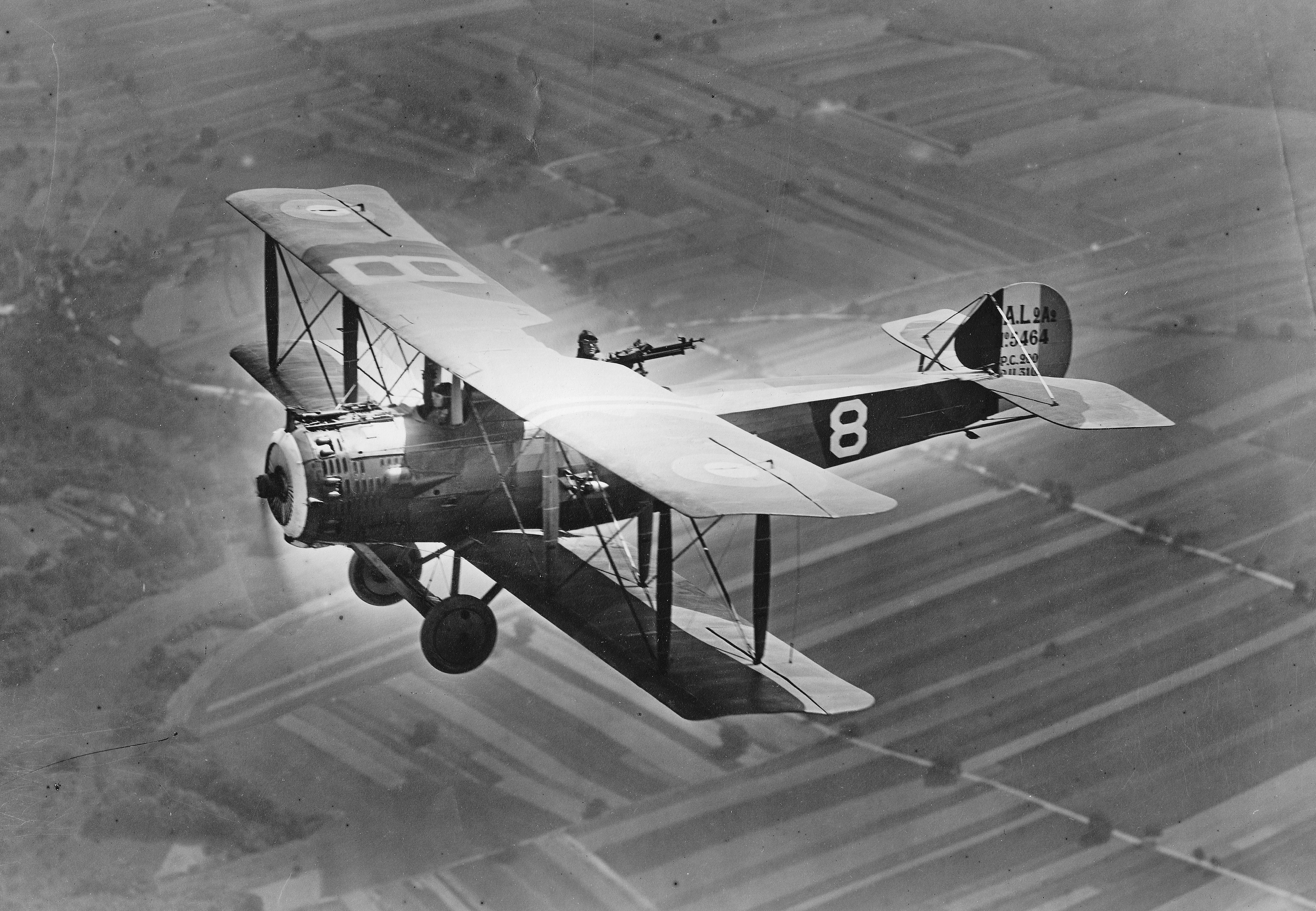
1st Aero Squadron Salmson 2A2 over France, 1918

On 4 April 1918, the 1st Aero Squadron was assigned to the I Corps Observation Group, Air Service, First Army, and was designated as a Corps Observation Squadron. Movement was made to Ourches Aerodrome for combat duty. In combat, the mission of the 1st Aero Squadron was general surveillance of the enemy rear areas by means of both visual and photographic reconnaissance. These missions were carried out for the purpose of intelligence-gathering and informing First Army headquarters informed of enemy movements and preparations for attacks or retreats of its infantry forces. The 1st identified enemy activity along roads and railroads, ground stations, various storage dumps and airfields, the numbers of fires, and activities of enemy aircraft, and the amount of anti-aircraft artillery was also monitored and reported. Due to the nature of the missions and the depths of enemy area which was penetrated, the missions were carried out at high altitudes, usually between 4,500 and 5,500 meters (14,800 and 18,000 ft).

Bad weather and engine trouble with the SPAD aircraft plagued the squadron upon its arrival at the front, and on 12 April, the first contact with enemy aircraft was made, when Lt Coyle was attacked by three German planes. He escaped, his plane having several bullet holes. The work done by the squadron in its early days of combat operations was judged to be of a high order. A great deal of valuable intelligence was obtained. This was recognized when French General Passage, Chief of Staff of the 32d French Corps, awarded the "Croix de Guerre" to several aircrews for exceptional bravery in combat.

At the beginning of June, the 1st Aero Squadron was re-equipped with the latest in French observation aircraft, the Salmson 2A2. Also in June, the 1st Aero Squadron adopted the American flag as its squadron emblem, it being the first Air Service squadron on the front lines. The insignia was painted on the fuselage of all of its aircraft.

===== Chateau Thierry offensive =====
On 29 June, the squadron moved to Saints Aerodrome to take part in the Chateau Thierry offensive, the first major American operation of the war. Flying over the front began on 1 July and from the beginning, a great number of combats with enemy aircraft were encountered. The Germans appeared to have concentrated a large number of aircraft over the sector, to counter a large number of British aircraft which had operated there prior to the 1st Squadron's arrival. The combat sustained in the offensive therefore, was quite heavy. The squadron was tasked with missions of the greatest importance, and heroic actions were frequent. Operations began with the squadron having less than its full number of aircraft, pilots and observers. Until replacements were received, ground mechanics and other support personnel worked day and night, and observation patrols were flown from dawn until dusk, sometimes into the night, with two or three sorties per day with each aircraft.

===== St. Mihiel Offensive =====
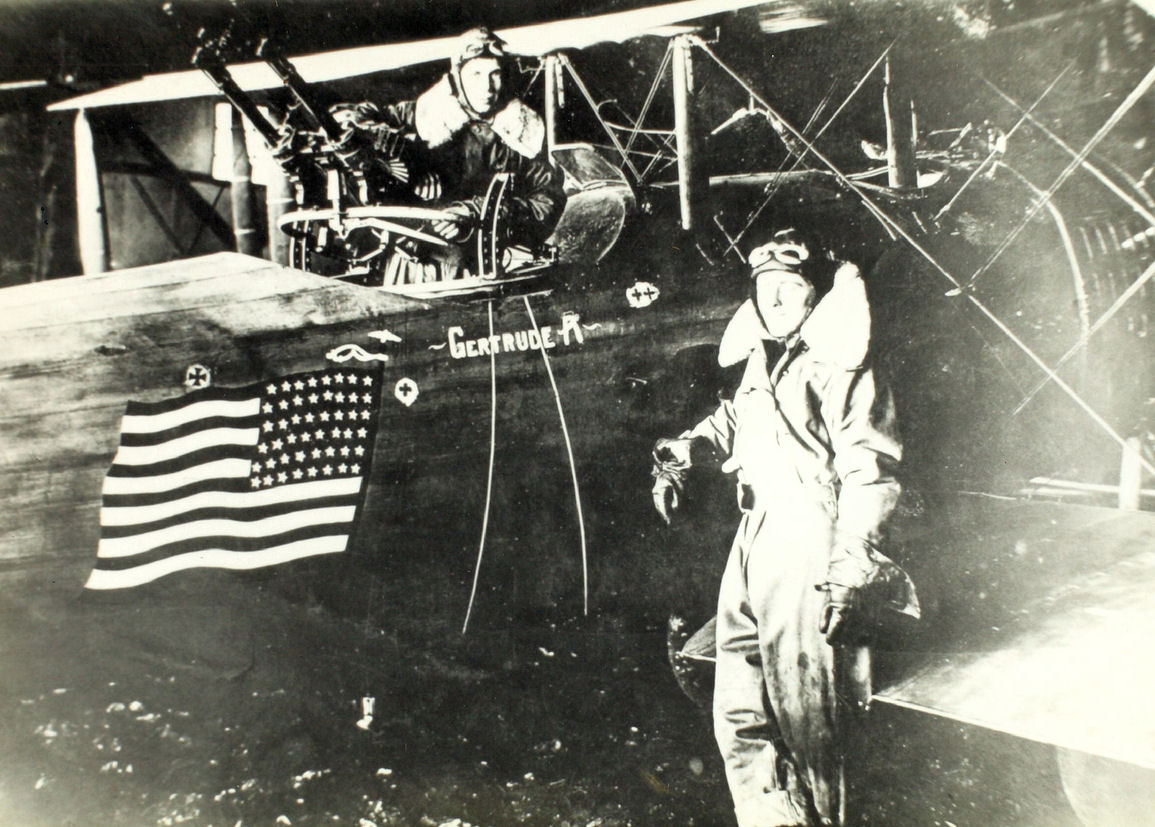
1st Aero Squadron observer Arthur Edmund Easterbrook and pilot Arthur Coyle next to their Salmson 2A2 with American Flag squadron emblem

In preparation for the St. Mihiel Offensive, the 1st Aero Squadron moved to Croix de Metz Aerodrome, near Toul, on 22 August. The St. Mihiel salient in the line covered an area of 390 square kilometers (150 sq mi) and its elimination was the next major task for the American Expeditionary Forces. About 02:00 on 12 September, their artillery opened up to begin the offensive. The squadron received orders to fly no lower than 600 meters (2,000 ft) in overflying enemy territory, but the 1st flew much lower than that, flying anywhere between 50 and 400 meters (160 and 1,310 ft) in altitude in order to avoid enemy machine-gun fire. Shortly after daylight, squadron aircraft No. 6 took off. The sun was clear before it arrived over the lines, but then disappeared behind the clouds. American infantry had just crossed the German lines and it was noted that panels had been placed on the ground indicating that their artillery barrage was falling about 100 meters short. That information was sent to division headquarters. This routine was repeated for the next several hours as the advance continued. It was observed that the Germans were making a hasty retreat and deserting their guns, with their officers on horseback. Squadron aircraft attacked the retreating enemy with machine guns on low-level attacks. Wagons and trucks in the enemy rear were also attacked until fuel was nearly exhausted, landing back at Toul with nearly empty tanks. During the offensive, the ground infantry were continually supported by observation aircraft, assisting them in every manner possible.

During the offensive, the work done by the 1st Aero Squadron was of the most importance, giving divisional commanders the vital information as to where the front line elements actually were, where artillery barrages need to be laid down in advance of the infantry and for causing disruption to enemy forces behind his lines. Later, as positions became stabilized, photographs were obtained behind enemy lines to learn the dispositions of enemy forces.

===== Meuse-Argonne offensive =====
After flying in the St. Mihiel sector for several weeks, on 21 September the squadron was moved to the Remicourt Aerodrome in the Argonne Forest, getting ready for the next big American push. Squadron personnel began to believe they were a "shock" squadron, having taken the lead in the previous battles of Chateau Thierry and Saint-Mihiel, coming out of both bruised and battle-scarred. Intelligence raft of the 1st Aero Squadron provided the critical intelligence of what lay ahead of them, trying to find out what the half-routed enemy was trying to do. Constant flying and continual combats with enemy aircraft were routine and deadly, but the intelligence and photography carried out by the squadron was of the highest importance.

Operations continued until 9 November when the order came from Corps headquarters to cease flying, and it was believed it simply meant to move to another sector. However, on 11 November, news was received that an armistice has been signed.

1st Aero Squadron pilots recorded 13 aerial victories during the war, commemorated by 13 Maltese crosses encircling their squadron emblem. The 1st Aero squadron lost 16 pilots killed in action and three missing-in-action.

===== Third Army of Occupation =====
After the armistice, the I Corps Observation Group was disbanded and the squadron was assigned to serve as part of the occupation force of the Rhineland under the Third Army Air Service, III Corps Observation Group at the former Andernach Airdrome, near Coblenz. One of its duties was to fly over Cologne and other parts of the Rhineland occupied by Third Army. In addition, the squadron was able to perform test flights on surrendered German aircraft. Flights of the Fokker D.VII, Pfalz D.XII, Halberstadts and Rumpler aircraft were made and evaluations were made.

On 13 June 1919, the squadron first went to the 1st Air Depot at Colombey-les-Belles Airdrome, to turn in all of its supplies and equipment and was relieved from duty with the AEF. The squadron's planes were delivered to the Air Service Production Center No. 2. at Romorantin Aerodrome. It then moved to a staging camp in France for the return crossing of the Atlantic back to the United States.

==== World War I honors ====
===== Combat sectors and campaigns =====
Streamer	Sector/Campaign	Dates	Notes
	Toul Sector	4 April – 28 June 1918	
	Aisne-Marne Sector	1–14 July 1918	
	St. Mihiel Offensive Campaign	15–18 July 1918	
	Aisne-Marne Defensive Campaign	7 July – 6 August 1918	
	Vesle Sector	7–12 August 1918	
	Toul Sector	12 August – 11 September 1918	
	St. Mihiel Offensive Campaign	12–16 September 1918	
	Toul-Verdun Sector	17–25 September 1918	
	Meuse-Argonne Offensive Campaign	26 September – 11 November 1918	

===== Notable personnel =====
- BG Arthur Edmund Easterbrook, DSC (2x), Air Ace, 5 aerial victories
- Capt. Byrne V. Baucom, DSC (2x), 3 aerial victories
- Lt. A. J. Coyle, SSC
- Lt. Fred W. Clark, SSC
- Lt. James W. Corley, SSC
- Lt. Kenneth P. Culbert, SSC
- Lt. Fred E. D'Amour, SSC
- Lt. Ralph E. De Castro, DSC
- Lt. Col. Townsend F. Dodd, DSM
- Lt. Arthur W. Duckstein, DSC, 1 aerial victory
- Lt. William Portwood Erwin, DSC (2x), Air Ace, 8 aerial victories
- Lt. Edward Groteclose, Jr., SSC
- Lt. Charles A. Henry, SSC
- Lt. John H. Michener, DSC
- Lt. James M. Richardson, DSC, 4 aerial victories
- Lt. Stephen W. Thompson, First US military victory, Croix de Guerre with Palm
- Lt. E. G. Wold, SSC
- Lt. James Council Wooten, SSC

DSC: Distinguished Service Cross; DSM: Distinguished Service Medal; SSC: Silver Star Citation

=== Inter-War era ===
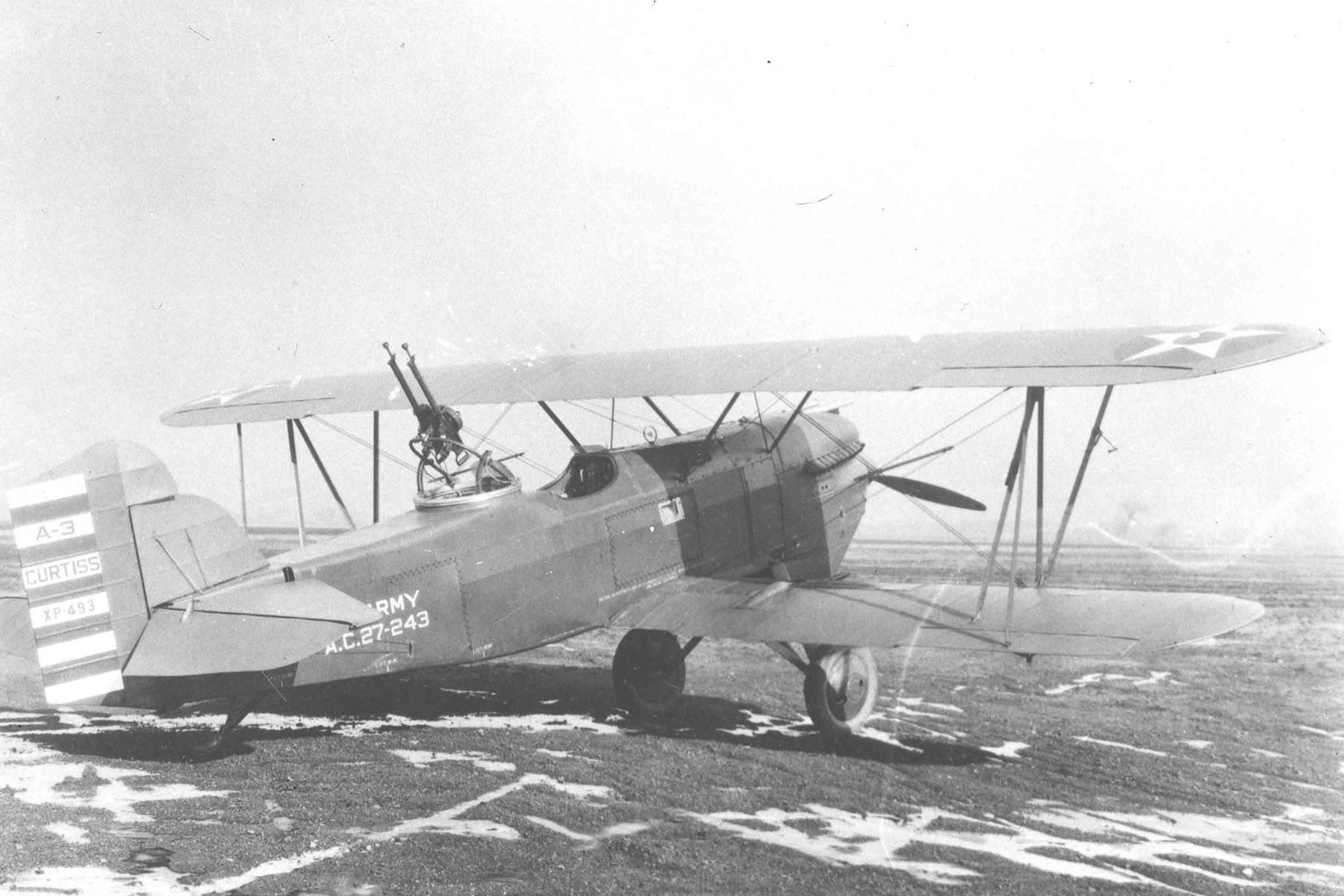
Douglas O-2, 1928

Upon its return to the United States, the 1st Aero Squadron was based first at Park Field, Tennessee, on 4 August 1919, and then at Mitchel Field, New York, on 10 October 1919, where it remained until 1940.

Assigned as a component of the Air Service's 1st Army Observation Group (briefly the 7th Observation Group in 1921) from 1 October 1919, to 30 August 1921, the 1st Aero Squadron was redesignated the 1st Squadron (Observation) on 14 March 1921. It was attached to the 1st Provisional Air Brigade from 1 May to 3 October 1921. This temporary unit, organized by Gen. William L. Mitchell, sank the German battleship Ostfriesland on 21 July in bombardment tests. The squadron functioned briefly as part of the 2nd Wing before being assigned to the Second Corps Area on 30 September 1921. The 1st Aero Squadron used the de Havilland DH-4 observation airplane as its primary equipment from 1919 to 1928.

The 1st Squadron was assigned as a component squadron of the new 9th Observation Group on 1 August 1922. It was assigned directly to the II Corps on 23 March 1923, as the 1st Observation Squadron, but remained attached to the 9th Observation Group. This command arrangement continued until 15 February 1929, when the 1st Observation Squadron was permanently assigned to the 9th Group.

Its aircraft from 1928 to 1935 was primarily the Curtiss O-1B Falcon observation plane, but it also field tested and employed other Falcon variants (O-13, O-39, and Y1O-40 Raven) and several Douglas observation types, the Y1O-31, Y1O-35 and O-35. The 1st Observation Squadron's O-35s all participated in delivering the U.S. Mail in 1934 without loss.

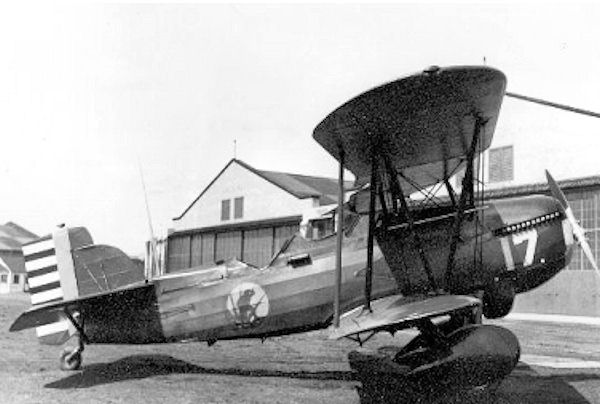
Curtiss O-39 Falcon 32–0217.

The Air Service became the U.S. Army Air Corps on 2 July 1926, and kept that title until reorganized as the United States Army Air Forces on 20 June 1941. In early 1935 the Air Corps was re-organized, with all combat groups being centrally controlled for the first time, under a new command organization called General Headquarters, Air Force. The role of observation as the primary function of the air arm had been de-emphasized in the creation of eight new Air Corps groups between 1927 and 1932. With the creation of General Headquarters Air Force (GHQAF) it was further de-emphasized when the 9th and its component squadrons were converted into a bombardment group and made a part of the 2nd Wing, responsible for the air defense of the East Coast of the United States.

The 1st Observation Squadron became the 1st Bombardment Squadron on 1 March 1935, and was equipped with Keystone B-6 bombers. It converted to Martin B-10 bombers in 1936 and operated these until 1938, when it again re-equipped, with Douglas B-18 bombers. The designations of the squadron changed in the late 1930s as the role of bombardment became pre-eminent in the Air Corps, becoming the 1st Bomb Squadron (Medium) on 6 December 1939, and the 1st Bomb Squadron (Heavy) on 20 November 1940. During the period 1935–1940 the 1st Bomb Squadron trained aircrews, took part in maneuvers, and participated in air shows.

=== World War II ===
==== Sixth Air Force ====
The 1st deployed with its parent group on 5 November 1940 on the USAT Chateau Thierry and arrived on 12 November 1940 at Rio Hato Army Air Base, Panama on 13 November 1940 from Langley Field, Virginia. The squadron was one of the units designated to move to Piarco Airport on Trinidad in late April 1941 after the U.S. gained base rights there from the British in the Destroyers for Bases Agreement. In fact, the 1st Bomb Squadron's entire sojourn in the Caribbean after its brief interval at Rio Hato was based on Trinidad, moving from Piarco to the new Waller Field by 12 May 1941 and, later, to Edinburgh Field on 23 August 1942. As of the United States' entry into the war, it was the only USAAF antisubmarine unit on Trinidad.

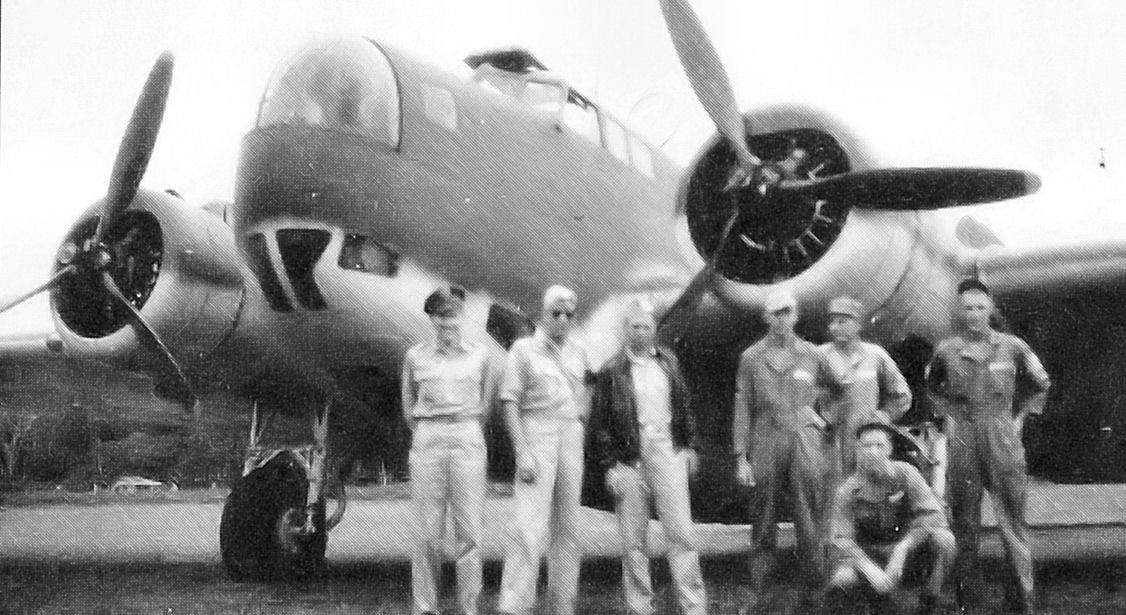
1st Bombardment Squadron B-18 Bolo – Trinidad 1942.

By August 1941, the squadron was the proud operator of a solitary Boeing B-17B Flying Fortress (probably sin 38-264) at Waller (together with six Douglas B-18A Bolos), certainly one of the very few B-17's to fly anti-submarine patrols in the Caribbean. Although the surviving records arc rather confusing and very truncated, it appears that the squadron may have briefly been assigned or attached to the 72d Observation Group, although no orders or formal correspondence to this effect survive. By January 1942, the B-17B was gone, and only five of the B-18As were still airworthy at Waller, where the squadron was nominally under the operational control of the Trinidad Base Command.

By mid-February 1942, with four airworthy B-18A's still on hand, the squadron received a number of Consolidated LB-30 Liberators originally intended for the British. With these, the unit flew patrols over the Caribbean approaches to the Panama Canal to test the newly sited radars placed there, as well as routine anti-submarine patrols. The unit was technically still based at Waller Field, however, the Squadron was also called upon to detach an element to conduct patrols of the Vichy French Martinique area during April and May 1942. ed antisubmarine patrols and conducted reconnaissance of the Vichy French fleet at Martinique.

Although scant records survive, the 1st Bomb Squadron attacked a German U-boat on at least one occasion. On 17 August 1942, a squadron B-18A sighted a submarine some 20 miles from a convoy and dropped four depth charges after it crash dived. About 10 minutes later, a patch of oil appeared on the surface where the now-submerged submarine had been. The B-18A remained in the area a further 45 minutes, until it was relieved by another aircraft. There was no further sign of the submarine. Two days later, another squadron B-18A sighted a completely surfaced submarine at a distance of five miles from an altitude of 1,800 feet. Three depth charges were released, the third of which caused the sub to list away from the attack, side-slipping into the water. A fourth depth charge was believed to have hit the stern, then about 20 feet below the surface. The results of these attacks, however, were never confirmed.

==== Army Air Force School of Applied Tactics ====
The 9th Bomb Group and its squadrons were withdrawn from Trinidad, and returned without personnel or equipment to the United States in late August 1942, where all were reconstituted as part of the Air University Army Air Force School of Applied Tactics (AAFSAT) at Orlando Army Air Base, Florida. AAFSAT operated a combat simulation facility in Florida. Units and airfields were established throughout an 8,000-square-mile (21,000 km2) area of central and north central Florida designated a mock "war theater," stretching roughly from Tampa to Titusville and from Starke to Apalachicola in which war games were conducted using numerous military airfields.

The 1st was equipped with a mixture of medium and heavy bombers. The squadron operated primarily from Brooksville Army Airfield which runways could better accommodate the heavy bombers. Its squadrons trained bomber crews in organization and operations, performed bombing pattern tests, experimented with tactical formations to attack moving ships, and performed equipment tests. The squadron also flew in maneuvers and took part in many experiments at Eglin Field, Florida. During this period, the 1st BS had twelve B-17 Flying Fortresses, two B-25 Mitchells and two L-3Cs observation aircraft assigned.

==== Twentieth Air Force ====
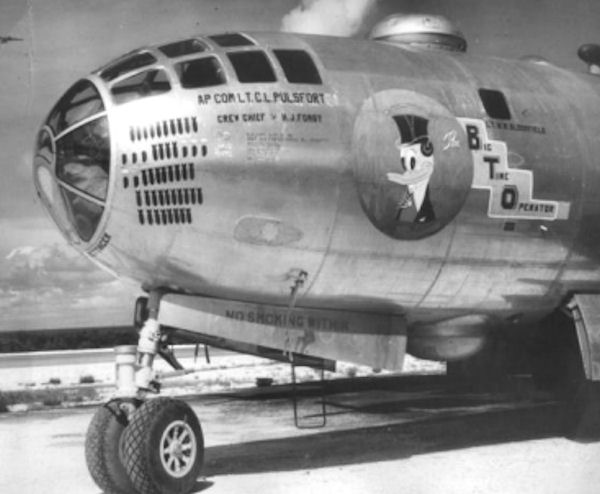
Boeing B-29-50-BW Superfortress 42-24791 Big Time Operator, Tinian North Field, 1945

The training mission of the 9th Bomb Group at AAFSAT was replaced by the 903d Army Air Forces Base Unit on 1 March 1944 with "Section D", the bombardment training in an administrative reorganization. As a result, the 1st Bomb Squadron was moved without aircraft or personnel to Dalhart Army Airfield, Texas. On 28 March, it was re-designated the 1st Bombardment Squadron (Very Heavy) and began to organization process for training as a B-29 Superfortress squadron.

During April the key personnel of the new squadron assembled at Dalhart, forming the command cadre, and were transferred with the group to McCook Army Airfield, Nebraska. After a brief period establishing the unit at McCook, the cadre of group and squadron operations staffs went by train to AAFSAT in May for the 4-week training course in organizing and operating very heavy bombardment units in the field. While the cadre was at AAFSAT, the influx of new personnel continued at McCook.

After the return of the squadron staff in June 1944, the squadron organized new crews and conducted an intensive program of ground and flying training using B-17 aircraft to practice takeoffs, landings, instrument and night flying, cross-country navigation, high altitude formation flying, and bombing and gunnery practice.

The development of the B-29 as an operational weapon had been plagued since an early flight test on 28 December 1942, resulted in an engine fire, culminating in a massive emergency modification program in the winter of 1943–44 ordered by General Henry H. Arnold, Chief of the Army Air Forces, and nicknamed the "Battle of Kansas". In particular, the program sought to resolve a spate of problems with serious engine fires and faulty gunnery central fire control systems. All B-29s modified in this program were diverted to the 58th Bomb Wing to meet President Franklin D. Roosevelt's commitment to China to have B-29s deployed to the China-Burma-India Theater in the spring of 1944, leaving none available to equip the 12 new groups being formed in the 73rd, 313th, and 314th Wings.

The 9th Group received its first training B-29 on 13 July 1944. After four further months of training the group commander declared the unit ready for movement overseas, and its ground echelon left McCook for Seattle, Washington, Port of Embarkation on 18 November 1944, traveling by troopship to the Mariana Islands on a voyage that required thirty days. The ground echelon of the group debarked at Tinian on 28 December and was assigned a camp on the west side of the island between the two airfields.

The air echelon of the 1st Bomb Squadron began its overseas movement on 15 January 1945, from its staging base at Mather Army Airfield, California, after accepting the first of its 14 new B-29s at Herington Army Airfield, Kansas. The squadron's bombers proceeded individually by way of Hickam Field, Hawaii, and Kwajalein to North Field, Tinian, with the first three arriving on 18 January 1945. The final two of the original 14 airplanes arrived on Tinian on 3 February by which time the squadron had already flown three practice missions to the Maug Islands in the Northern Marianas.

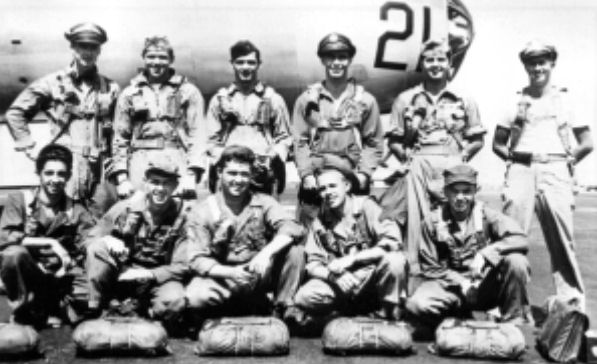
1st Bombardment Squadron crew of the "Twentieth Century Limited", Boeing B-29A-45-BN Superfortress 44–61797.

The 1st Bomb Squadron conducted its first combat mission on 9 February 1945, against a Japanese naval airfield located on the island of Moen at Truk atoll (now known as the Chuuk Islands). Flown by day at an altitude of 25,000 feet (7,600 m), it was in actuality a further training mission, encountering no opposition. Its second mission was to Iwo Jima on 12 February, one week prior to D-Day for Operation Detachment. The capture of Iwo Jima had as its objective an emergency landing field for Twentieth Air Force bombers attacking Japan and a base for escorting P-51 and P-47 fighters.

The first mission to the Japanese home islands was the 1st Bomb Squadron's fifth, flown 25 February 1945. Again a day mission flown at high altitude, the target was the port facilities of Tokyo. On the squadron's seventh mission, 9–10 March 1945, Tokyo was attacked with incendiaries by night and at low altitudes of 6,400 to 7,800 feet (2,400 m). This mission also resulted in the first loss of a 1st Squadron B-29 when the crew of L'il Iodine was forced to crash-land at sea when it ran out of fuel returning to Tinian, although the crew was rescued.

The Tokyo fire raid was the first of five flown between 9 and 18 March, resulting in devastation of four urban areas (Tokyo, Nagoya, Osaka and Kobe) and extensive civilian loss of life. The squadron had a B-29 bomber [44-69748] shot down and crew lost on 24 March 1945, attacking the Mitsubishi Aircraft factory at Nagoya, the same crew that had ditched on 10 March.

On 27 March, the 1st Squadron began a week of night missions sowing aerial anti-shipping mines of Japanese harbor approaches and Inland Sea ship passages, a mission they would again conduct during the entire second half of May. Attacks in April were a combination of night and medium altitude day missions against the Japanese aircraft industry, and beginning 18 April, three weeks of daytime attacks against Japanese airfields on Kyūshū launching Kamikaze attacks against U.S. naval forces at Okinawa.

On 1 June, the 1st Bomb Squadron began a grim campaign of night fire raids against the remaining urban areas of Japan not previously attacked that continued to its final mission, 14 August 1945. In all, the 1st Bomb Squadron flew 71 combat missions, 3 post-hostilities flyover missions, and one mission to drop medical and food supplies to liberated prisoners-of-war.

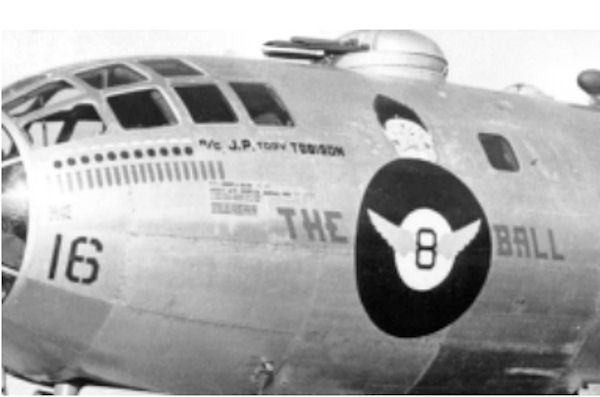
Boeing B-29-75-BW Superfortress 44–70070.

Of the 71 combat missions, 27 were fire raids, 14 mining, 13 against airfields, 9 against aircraft production, and 9 against other industry or targets other than the home islands. 39 of the missions were flown at night, and 32 by day. Only 6 of the 71 combat missions were flown above 20,000 feet (6,100 m) altitude.

The 1st Bomb Squadron had 28 B-29s assigned to it on Tinian. Two were reassigned to other units, one was declared "war-weary" and used for local flights only, two were written off for salvage, one crashed on takeoff 20 May, destroying two parked bombers of another group and itself, and six were lost on missions—an aircraft attrition rate of 34.6% over six months. The squadron had 33 combat crews of 11 airmen each on its rosters during its combat operations. Four crews were missing in action or killed (12%), and three crews completed a full operational tour of 35 missions before the Japanese surrender.

After the end of the war, the squadron received two Presidential Unit Citations as part of the 9th Bomb Group, for a mission against Kawasaki On 15–16 April 1945, and for mine-laying operations 13–28 May 1945.

The 1st Bomb Squadron remained on Tinian until 7 March 1946, although most of its crews and aircraft were returned to the United States in the interim to be de-mobilized. On 14 March 1946, the group and squadron set up limited operations at Clark Field, Luzon, where they remained until 9 June 1947. By that date, although still an active unit, the squadron was unmanned, and was transferred "on paper" to Harmon Field, Guam, where it remained in a paper status until 10 October 1948.

=== Strategic Air Command ===
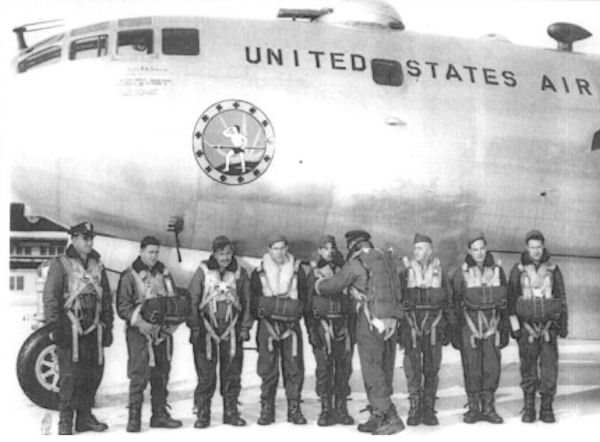
RB-29 Superfortress and 1st SRS crew, Topeka AFB, Kansas, 1948

The United States Air Force became a separate military service on 18 September 1947, during the period of time when the 1st Squadron was without personnel or equipment. On 10 October 1948, the 1st Squadron was removed from the 9th Bomb Group (which was inactivated), re-designated the 1st Strategic Reconnaissance Squadron, Photographic (SRS), and assigned to the 311th Air Division of Strategic Air Command (SAC) at Topeka Air Force Base, Kansas. In Kansas, squadron members immediately began training with RB-29 Superfortresses.

In May 1949, the squadron moved to Fairfield-Suisun AFB (now Travis AFB), California, and was assigned to the 9th Strategic Reconnaissance Wing. Initially equipped with a mix of B-29, RB-29 and RB-17 aircraft, the 1st SRS was earmarked to become an RB-36 Peacemaker unit and did receive three B-36B bombers in preparation for this assignment. However, in April 1950, the Air Force re-designated the 9th Strategic Reconnaissance Wing the 9th Bombardment Wing and, consequently, the 1st SRS became the 1st Bombardment Squadron and started to receive conventional B-29s and also atomic-capable B-29MRs.

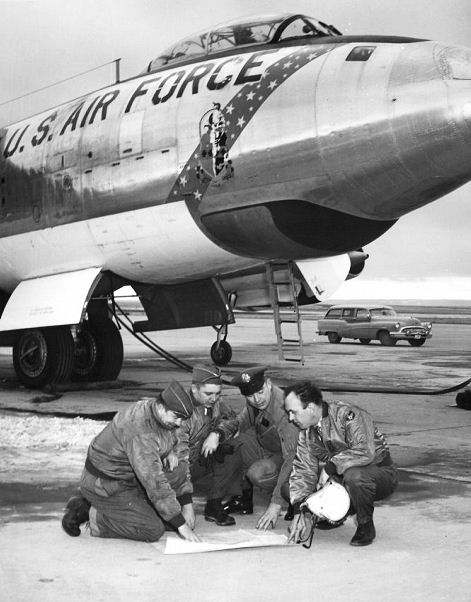
B-47E Stratojet with 1st BS crew, Mountain Home AFB, Idaho, 1956

During the Korean War, the 1st Bombardment Squadron participated in several rotations to Harmon AFB, Guam, as a contingency atomic-capable force. The 1st BS along with its parent wing, the 9th BW, would transfer to Mountain Home AFB, Idaho, in May 1953. There the squadron would continue to fly B-29s until 1954 when they started to receive Boeing B-47 Stratojet bombers.

During the Air Force's first decade, budgetary shortfalls led to the search for more cost-efficient Wing operations. In 1952, many of the World War II Combat Groups began to be phased out and inactivated as more wings assumed direct control of the combat squadrons. On 16 June 1952, the 9th Group was inactivated and the squadron was assigned directly to Wing control.

For the next twelve years, the 1st BS remained at the forefront of America's nuclear deterrent force. In November 1955, the squadron helped established a non-stop point-to-point long-distance record during a flight from Mountain Home Air Force Base, Idaho, to New Zealand, a distance of 8,300 miles, with the aid of aerial refueling. And from 1955 through 1958, the squadron would deploy to RAF Fairford, England; Kadena Air Base, Okinawa; Eielson Air Force Base, Alaska; and Andersen AFB, Guam.

From 1962 to 1965, the 1st BS operated several EB-47E Stratojets, a classified program which were electronics countermeasure conversions of the standard B-47E. These was equipped with what was known as the Phase IV (or Blue Cradle) ECM package, consisting of 16 AN/ALT-6B electronic jammers mounted on a cradle inside the bomb bay. Some of the EB-47ss carried a pressurized capsule inside the bomb bay that carried two electronics warfare officers that operated a suite of up to 13 different jammers that could focus on specific threats.

In late 1965, SAC and Tactical Air Command (TAC) completed a transfer agreement assigning Mountain Home to TAC effective 1 January 1966, with TAC transferring Bergstrom AFB, Texas to SAC. Since 1960, the B-47 was being phased out of service, as Soviet Air Defenses improved and the development of ICBMs had taken more and more of the nuclear mission. With the transfer of Mountain Home AFB, the B-47s of the 1st Bomb Squadron were retired. The last B-47E departed on 10 February and the personnel followed soon after.

==== Strategic Reconnaissance ====
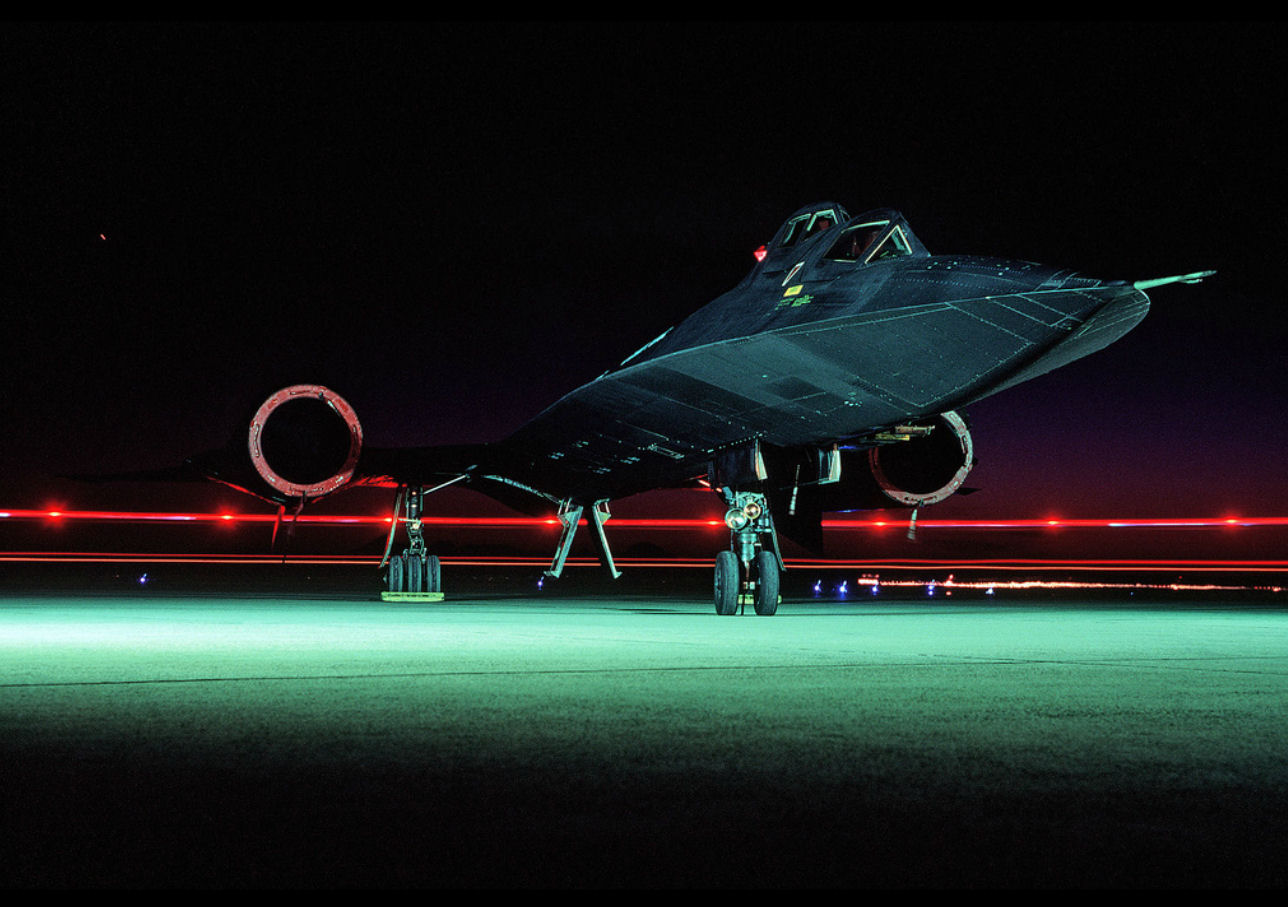
A 1st SRS SR-71B Blackbird sits on the runway after sundown

The SR-71 Blackbird joined the Air Force inventory in 1966. From Beale and several overseas operating locations, the 1st Strategic Reconnaissance Squadron conducted worldwide strategic reconnaissance missions, supporting national intelligence gathering requirements.

The Blackbird carried a crew of two—a pilot and a reconnaissance systems operator (RSO). The SR-71's versatility included simple battlefield surveillance, multiple-sensor high-performance interdiction reconnaissance, and strategic surveillance over large areas of the world. Flying over 2,000 mph at approximately 80,000 feet, the SR-71 carried sensors with a 45-degree viewing angle on each side that could survey 100,000 square miles in an hour.

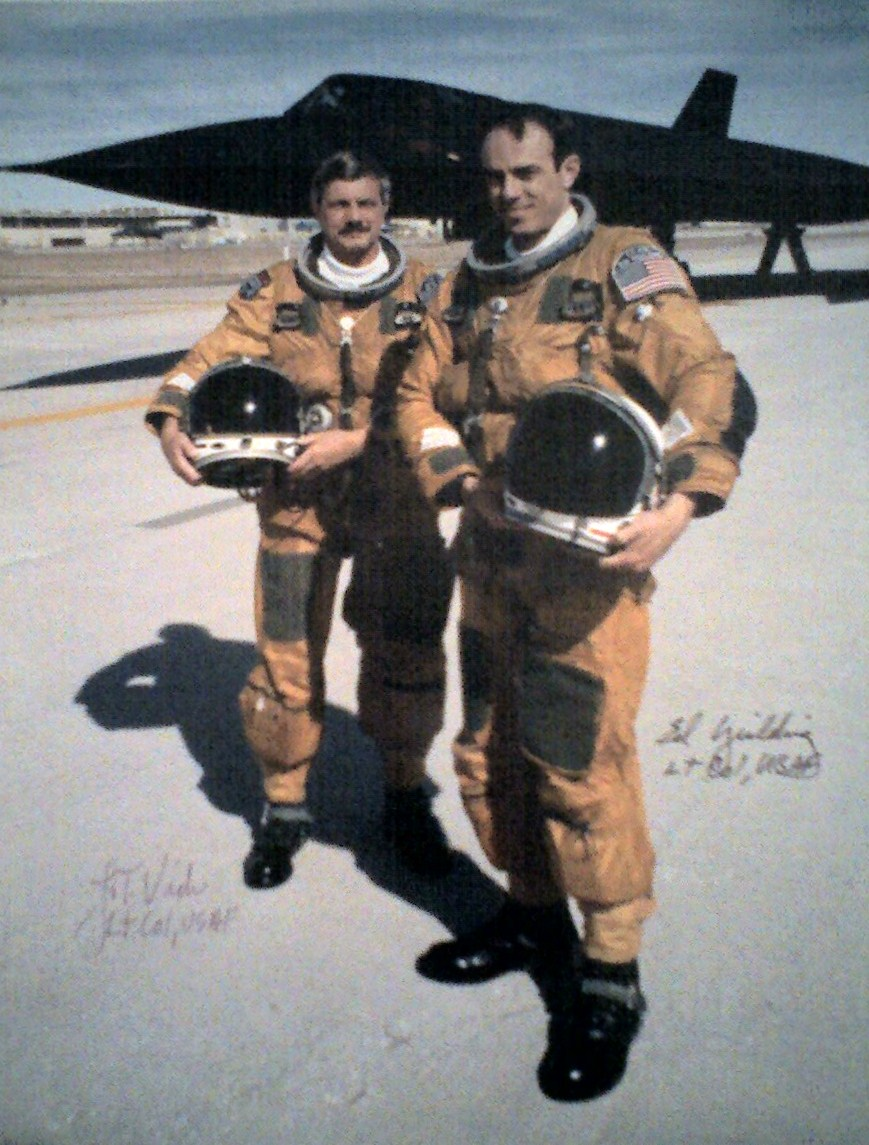
The "Last Flight" of a SR-71. In background SR-71 S/N 61-7972. Foreground Pilot Lt. Col. Raymond "Ed" E. Yielding and RSO LtCol. Joseph "JT" Vida 6 March 1990

Following the end of American involvement in Southeast Asia, the 1st turned to more peaceful accomplishment. The most spectacular of these was the SR-71 speed runs from New York to London and from London to Los Angeles. On 14 September 1974, Major James Sullivan, pilot and Major Noel Widdifield, RSO, flew their SR-71 from New York to London in 1 hour, 55 minutes, 42 seconds for an average speed of 1,817 mph. This bettered the old record set by a RAF F-4 Phantom jet of 4 hours, 46 minutes set in 1969. The SR-71 crew of Captain Harold Adams, pilot, and Major William Machorek, RSO, established a record for the London to Los Angeles route when they flew the 5,645-mile leg in 3 hours, 48 minutes on 13 September.

Because of budgetary reasons the Air Force retired the SR-71 in July 1990. But in March 1990, on its final journey from California to Washington D.C., where it became part of the collection at the Smithsonian Institution, an SR-71 flown by the 1st SRS made the coast-to-coast trip in a record time of 68 minutes, 17 seconds—at a record speed of 2,242.48 mph.

Flying the SR-71, the squadron was awarded a Presidential Unit Citation for the period 31 March – 31 December 1968, and an Air Force Outstanding Unit Award With Combat "V" Device for the period 1 July 1972 – 30 June 1973. The 1st SRS also received ten Air Force Outstanding Unit Awards for the periods 1 July – 30 June of the years 1967–1968, 1970–1971, 1971–1972, 1975–1977, 1981–1982, 1983–1984, 1985–1986, 1986–1987, 1989–1990, and 1991–1993.

=== Air Combat Command ===
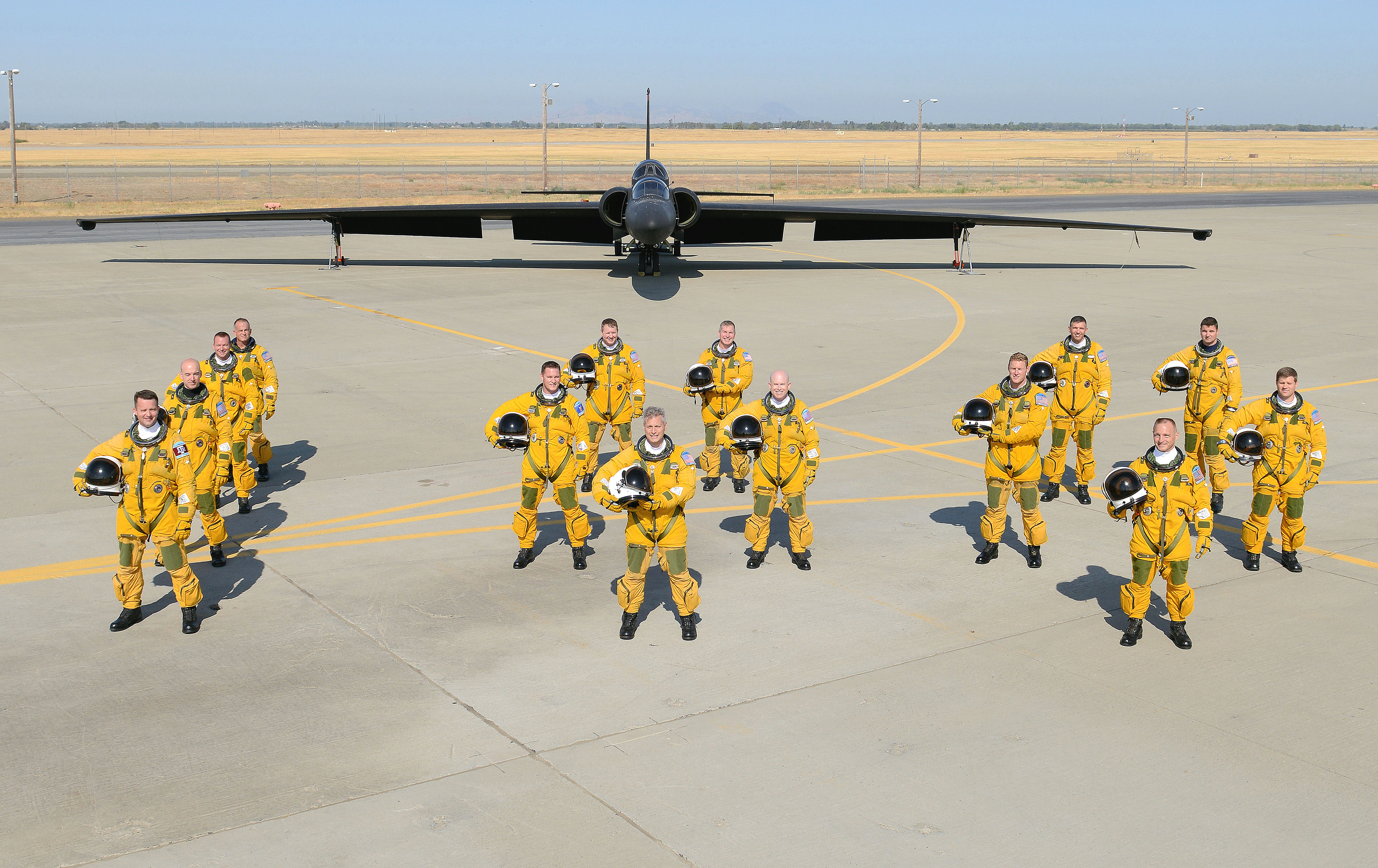
Fourteen U.S. Air Force U-2S Dragon Lady Intelligence, Surveillance and Reconnaissance Aircraft instructor pilots from the 1st Reconnaissance Squadron pose for a photo in front of a two-seat U-2S 17 August 2012.

After the initial interviews, orientation flights, and selection for the program, the new pilot undergoes approximately six months of extensive training, including twenty sorties in the U-2. Upon graduation, the new crewmember is not only mission-ready in the U-2, but also checked out in the T-38 companion trainer. The graduate then transfers to the 99th Reconnaissance Squadron and prepares for a tour at one of the overseas detachments.

The 1st also trains the mission planners. Mission planners have to know the wing's mission, the aircraft and sensors capabilities, plus detailed information on target and threat assessment at specific locations. After planners complete their training, they deploy to the overseas detachments and design flight tracks that allow the pilots to gather the best data with the least personal risk. The 1st Reconnaissance Squadron graduates about twelve pilots and two mission planners each year.

== Lineage ==
- Organized as the 1st Provisional Aero Squadron on 5 March 1913

Redesignated 1st Aero Squadron on 8 December 1913
Redesignated 1st Aero Squadron (Corps Observation) on 4 April 1918
Redesignated 1st Army Observation Squadron, 4 August 1919
Redesignated 1st Squadron (Observation) on 14 March 1921
Redesignated 1st Observation Squadron on 25 January 1923
Redesignated 1st Bombardment Squadron on 1 March 1935
Redesignated 1st Bombardment Squadron (Medium) on 6 December 1939
Redesignated 1st Bombardment Squadron (Heavy) on 20 November 1940
Redesignated 1st Bombardment Squadron, Very Heavy, on 28 March 1944
Redesignated 1st Strategic Reconnaissance Squadron, Photographic, on 10 October 1948
Redesignated 1st Bombardment Squadron, Heavy, on 1 April 1950
Redesignated 1st Bombardment Squadron, Medium on 2 October 1950
Redesignated 1st Strategic Reconnaissance Squadron on 25 June 1966
Redesignated 1st Strategic Reconnaissance Squadron (Training) on 1 July 1990
Redesignated 1st Reconnaissance Squadron (Training) on 1 September 1991
Redesignated 1st Reconnaissance Squadron on 1 July 1994

== Assignments ==
- Unknown, 5 March 1913 – September 1917
- Headquarters, Chief of Air Service, AEF, 1 September 1917
- I Corps Observation Group, 4 April 1918
- III Corps Observation Group, 18 November 1918
- 1st Air Depot, 12 May 1919
- Commanding General, Services of Supply, – 14 May July 1919
- First Army Observation (later, 7th Observation) Group, 1 October 1919

Attached to: 1st Provisional Air Brigade for operations, 6 May – 3 October 1921

- 2d Wing (Provisional), 30 August 1921
- II Corps Area, 30 September 1921
- 9th Observation (later, 9th Bombardment) Group, 1 August 1922
- 9th Division, USA, 24 March 1923

Attached to: 9th Observation Group, 24 March 1923

- 9th Observation Group, 15 February 1929
- 311th Air Division, 10 October 1948

Attached to: 55th Strategic Reconnaissance Wing, 10–26 October 1948
Attached to: 55th Strategic Reconnaissance Group, 27 October 1948 – 31 May 1949

- 9th Strategic Reconnaissance (later, 9th Bombardment) Group, 1 June 1949

Attached to: 9th Bombardment Wing, 10 February 1951 – 15 June 1952

- 9th Bombardment (later, 9th Strategic Aerospace; 9th Strategic Reconnaissance) Wing, 16 June 1952
- 9th Operations Group, 1 September 1991 – Present

== Stations ==
=== Pre World War I ===
- Texas City, Texas, 5 March 1913
- North Island, San Diego, California, c. 28 November 1913

Detachment operated from: Fort Crockett, Texas, 30 Apr – 13 July 1914
Detachment operated from: Brownsville, Texas, 17 Apr – c. 24 May 1915

- Ft Sill, Oklahoma, 29 July 1915

Detachment operated from: Brownsville, Texas, 18 Aug – c. Dec 1915

- Fort Sam Houston, Texas, 26 November 1915
- Columbus Airfield, New Mexico, 15 March 1916
- Casas Grandes, Mexico (operated from Colonia Dublan), 19 March 1916
- San Geronimo, Mexico, 5 April 1916
- San Antonio, Mexico, 9 April 1916
- Satevo, Mexico, 11 April 1916
- Namiquipa, Mexico, 17 April 1916
- Columbus Airfield, New Mexico, 22 April 1916 – 5 August 1917

Detachments operated from: Colonia Dublan and El Valle, Mexico, until c. Jan 1917

=== World War I ===
- Avord Aerodrome, France, 13 September 1917
- Issoudun Aerodrome, France, 20 September 1917
- Amanty Aerodrome, France, 19 October 1917
- Ourches Aerodrome, France, 4 April 1918
- Saints Aerodrome, France, 29 June 1918
- Francheville Aerodrome, France, 6 July 1918
- Ferme de Moras Aerodrome, France, c. 22 July 1918
- May-en-Multien Aerodrome, France, 5 August 1918
- Coincy Aerodrome, France, 10 August 1918
- Chailly-en-Brie Aerodrome, France, 13 August 1918
- Croix de Metz Aerodrome (Toul), France, 22 August 1918
- Remicourt Aerodrome, France, 21 September 1918
- Julvecourt Aerodrome, France, 5 November 1918
- Weißenthurm Airdrome, Germany, 21 December 1918
- Colombey-les-Belles Airdrome, France, 12 May 1919
- France (undetermined) May–July 1919

=== United States Army Air Service/Corps/Forces ===
- Park Field, Tennessee, 4 August 1919
- Mitchel Field, New York, 10 October 1919 – 6 November 1940

Operated From: Langley Field, Virginia, 6 May – 26 October 1921

- Río Hato Army Air Base, Panama, 13 November 1940
- Piarco Airport, Trinidad, 24 April 1941
- Waller Field, Trinidad, 29 October 1941
- Edinburgh Field, Trinidad, 23 August 1942
- Orlando Army Air Base, Florida 31 October 1942
- Brooksville Army Airfield, Florida, 15 December 1942
- Orlando Army Air Base, Florida 25 February 1944
- Dalhart Army Airfield, Texas, c. 3 March 1944
- McCook Army Airfield, Nebraska, 19 May – 18 November 1944
- North Field, Tinian, 28 December 1944 – 7 March 1946
- Clark Field, Luzon, Philippines, 14 March 1946
- Harmon Field, Guam, 9 June 1947 – 10 October 1948

=== United States Air Force ===
- Topeka Air Force Base, Kansas, 10 October 1948
- Fairfield-Suisun (later, Travis) Air Force Base, California, 1 June 1949
- Mountain Home Air Force Base, Idaho, 1 May 1953

Deployed at: RAF Fairford, England, 22 May – 8 July 1955

- Beale Air Force Base, California, 25 June 1966 – Present

== Aircraft ==
Pre-1917

- Wright B (S.C. #3) May 1913 – 1915
- Burgess-Wright (S.C. #5) May 1913 – 1915
- Burgess-H (S.C. #9) May 1913 – 1915
- Burgess I-Scout 1913–1915
- Burgess J-Scout 1913–1915
- Wright C May 1913 – 1914
- Wright D-Scout 1913–1915
- Curtiss D 1913–1915
- Curtiss E 1913–1915
- Curtiss H 1913–1915
- Martin TT 1913–1915
- Curtiss JN-2 (JN-3) 1915–1916
- Curtiss N-8 1916
- Curtiss R-2 1916–1917
- Standard H-2 1916–1917
- Standard H-3 1916–1917
- Curtiss Twin JN 1916–1917
- Martin R-Land 1916–1917
- Sturtevant Adv Tr 1916–1917
- Lowe, Willard, and Fowler V-1 1916–1917
- Thomas D-5 1916–1917
- Curtiss JN-4 1916–1917

World War I/Inter-War period

- Avion de Reconnaissance 1 (AR 1), 1917–1918
- SPAD S.XIA.2 1918
- Salmson 2A2 1918–1919
- DeHavilland DH-4 1919–1928
- Douglas O-2 1919–1928
- Curtiss O-1 1928–1936
- Curtiss O-13 1930–1936
- Douglass Y1O-31 1930–1936
- Douglas Y1O-35 1930–1936
- Curtiss O-39 1930–1936
- Keystone B-6. 1930–1936
- Martin B-10, 1936–1938
- B-18 Bolo, 1938–1942

World War II

- B-17 Flying Fortress, 1942–1944
- B-24 Liberator, 1942–1944
- B-25 Mitchell, 1943–1944
- B-26 Invader, 1943–1944
- Boeing C-73, 1943–1944
- B-29 Flying Fortress, 1944–1947

United States Air Force

- RB-17 Flying Fortress, 1949–1950
- B-29 Superfortress, 1949–1951
- RB-29 Superfortress, 1949–1950
- B-36 Peacemaker, 1949–1950
- B-47 Stratojet, 1954–1966
- T-38 Talon 1966–Present
- SR-71 Blackbird, 1966–1990
- KC-135 Stratotanker, 1991–1993
- Lockeed U-2R 1990–1998
- Lockheed U-2S 1994–Present
- Lockheed TU-2S 1994–Present
- RQ-4 Global Hawk, 2002–Present

== Campaign streamers ==
- Mexico 1916–1917

World War I:

- Lorraine
- Île-de-France
- Champagne
- Champagne-Marne
- Aisne-Marne
- St Mihiel
- Meuse-Argonne

World War II:

- Antisubmarine, American Theater
- Air Offensive, Japan
- Eastern Mandates
- Western Pacific

== Commanders ==
- Capt. Charles de Forest Chandler, 5 Mar 1913
- Capt. Arthur S. Cowan, 1 Apr 1913
- Maj Benjamin D. Foulois, by Apr 1914
- 1Lt William L. Patterson, 26 Apr 1914
- Capt. Arthur S Cowan, by Jun 1914
- unk, 6 Aug 1914-c. Apr 1915
- Maj Benjamin O. Foulois, by Apr 1915
- unk, 4 Nov-c. Dec 1916
- Capt Townsend F. Dodd, by Dec 1916
- Maj Ralph Royce, 16-31 Mar 1917
- unk, 1-2 Apr 1917
- Cap J. L. Dunsworth, 3 Apr 1917
- Maj Ralph Royce, 9 Aug 1917
- Cap Joseph T. McNarney, 3 Oct 1917
- unk, 15 Oct 1917-c. Aug 1918
- 1Lt Arthur J. Coyle, 18 Aug 1918
- 1Lt Paul Myers, 26 Oct 1918
- unk, c. 1919
- Maj Thomas G. Lanphier, Dec 1920
- Capt John J. Devery, 28 Mar 1921
- Capt Truman W. Allen, 23 Jan 1922
- Maj Junius W. Jones, 12 Feb 1922
- Maj Davenport Johnson, 1 Aug 1922
- Capt Harry C. Drayton, 30 Jun 1925
- 1Lt Newton Longfellow, 4 Nov 1925
- 1Lt Newman R. Laughinghouse, 27 Feb 1928
- 1Lt Charles C. Chauncey, 10 Mar 1929
- 1Lt John A. Case, 9 Dec 1929
- 1Lt John W. McCullough, 3 Jul 1930
- Capt Earle J. Carpenter, 1 Jun 1932
- Capt Edward J. Raley, 5 Aug 1932
- Capt Earle J. Carpenter, 5 Jun 1934
- Maj William E. Lynd, 20 Aug 1934
- Maj Earle J. Carpenter, 1 Mar 1935
- Maj Charles P. Prime, 6 Jun 1935
- Maj Claude E. Duncan, 20 Jul 1936
- 2Lt B. E. Allen, by Aug 1938
- 1Lt. E. S. Wetzel, 29 Jan 1939
- Capt Stuart P. Wright, by Jul 1940
- Maj Alvin N. Moore, by Nov 1942
- Maj Mack McKay, 16 Jun 1943
- Lt Col Thomas J. Classen, 27 Feb 1944
- Lt Col Ralph E. Settle, 1 May 1944
- Lt Col Henry C. Huglin, 24 Feb 1945
- Lt Col Leroy V. Casey, 27 Mar 1945
- Maj Alton P. Donnell, Aug 1945
- unkn, Sep 1945
- (not manned, 25 Apr 1947-9 Oct 1948)
- Lt Col Harry L. Evans, by 1 Jun 1949
- Maj John S. McIntosh, May 1950
- Lt Col G. H. Fulcher, 5 Jun 1950
- Maj Ellis W. Wright Jr.., 27 Feb 1951
- Maj George Buckingham, May 1951
- Lt Col Frank E. Ferrell, May 1951
- Lt Col Boyd B. White, 23 Jul 1951
- Lt Col Frank E. Ferrell, 29 Dec 1951
- Lt Col Eugene Q. Steffes Jr., Nov 1953
- Lt Col Frank E. Ferrell, Jan 1954
- Lt Col Robert A. Weir, Oct 1954
- Lt Col Loren E. Buckey, Apr 1957
- Lt Col Herschel T. Pascoe, Aug 1959
- Maj Claude H. Bridges Jr., May 1960
- Lt Col Richard W. Edmonson, Jul 1962
- Lt Col James C. Mitchell, Jul 1964
- Lt Col John S. Harpster, Aug 1965
- Lt Col Harold E. Confer, 25 Jun 1966
- Lt Col Raymond L. Haupt, Nov 1966
- Lt Col Allan L. Hichew, Aug 1967
- Lt Col Patrick J. Halloran, Aug 1968
- Lt Col James L. Watkins, Dec 1969
- Lt Col Larry S. Devall, Jul 1971
- Lt Col George N. bull, Jun 1972
- Lt Col Bryan K. McCallum, Jul 1973
- Lt Col James H. Shelton, Jan 1974
- Lt Col Raphael S. Samay, Aug 1975
- Lt Col Adolphus H. Bledsoe Jr., Jul 1977
- Lt Col Randolph B. Hertzog, Dec 1978
- Lt Col Richard H. Graham, 2 Jan 1980
- Lt Col Eldon W. Joersz, 11 Aug 1981
- Lt Col Alan B. Cirino, 18 Jul 1983
- Lt Col Joseph C. Kinego, 2 Aug 1985
- Lt Col William D. Orcutt, 4 Aug 1987
- Lt Col William R. Dyckman, 10 Nov 1988
- Lt Col Kenneth W. Womack, 27 Dec 1990
- Lt Col Bobby L. Fairless, 2 Mar 1992
- Lt Col David J. Bonsi, 30 Apr 1993
- Lt Col David W. Wright, 20 May 1994
- Lt Col Joseph R. Muus, 23 Jun 1995
- Lt Col Mario C. Buda, 21 Jul 1997
- Lt Col Bryan K. Anderson, 26 Jul 1999
- Lt Col Domenick M. Eanniello, 23 Jul 2001
- Lt Col David E. Miller, 15 Oct 2002
- Lt Col Alan Marshall, (temporary), 14 Jul 2003
- Lt Col Walter Flint, 4 Sep 2003
- Lt Col Michael J. Masucci, 5 Aug 2005
- Lt Col Michael Glaccum, 15 May 2007
- Lt Col Mark L. Williamson, Jun 2009
- Lt Col Stephen C. Rodriguez, 19 May 2011
- Lt Col Colby Kuhns, 11 Jun 2013
- Lt Col Carl Maymi
- Lt Col Dane Collette
- Lt Col Benjamin J. Laubscher, 5 May 2021
- Lt Col John Mattson

Source: by Clay, Steven E., US Army Order of Battle 1919–1941 - Volume 3: The Services: Air Service, Engineers, and Special Troops, 1919–41

== See also ==
- Columbus Municipal Airport (New Mexico)
- Henry Post
- John Francisco Richards II
- List of American aero squadrons
- Organization of the Air Service of the American Expeditionary Force
- Stephen W. Thompson
