= Edmund P. Easterbrook =

American military officer and clergyman (1865–1933)

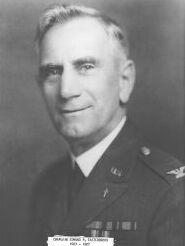
- Portrait of Easterbrook, circa 1928
- Born: December 22, 1865; Torquay, England
- Died: January 18, 1933 (aged 67); Hampton, Virginia, U.S.
- Burial place: Arlington National Cemetery
- Education: Drew Theological Seminary (BD)
- Spouse: Fannie Luscombe (m. 1892; died 1929)
- Children: 5, including Arthur and Ernest
- Military career
- Allegiance: United States
- Branch: United States Army
- Service years: 1898–1929
- Rank: Colonel
- Commands: U.S. Army Chaplain Corps
- Conflicts: Spanish–American War; Philippine–American War; World War I

Edmund Pepperell Easterbrook (December 22, 1865 – January 18, 1933) was an English-born American military officer and minister of the Methodist Episcopal Church who served as the 2nd Chief of Chaplains of the United States Army from 1928 to 1929.

He was married to the former Fannie Luscombe in September 1892. The couple would go on to have 5 children: Arthur, Gladys, William, Wilfred, and Ernest. Arthur and Ernest served as general officers in the Army, while Gladys married future general J. Lawton Collins.

He died in 1933 and is buried in Arlington National Cemetery.

Military offices
Preceded by Charles Brent	Senior Chaplain of the American Expeditionary Forces; 1918–1920	Succeeded by Position abolished
Preceded by John T. Axton	Chief of Chaplains of the United States Army; 1928–1929	Succeeded by Julian E. Yates
