= Arthur Edmund Easterbrook =

United States Army Air Forces general

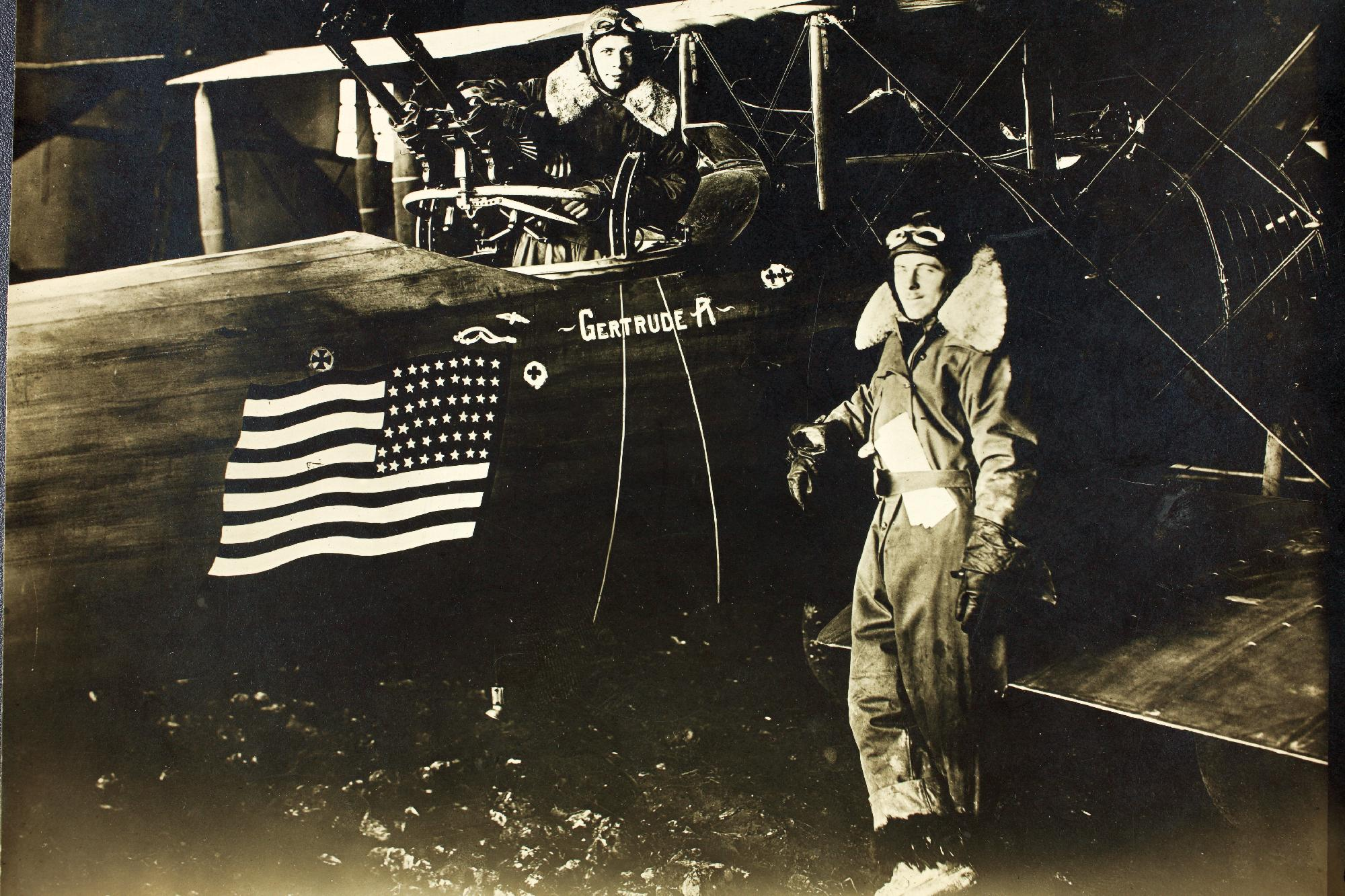
- Easterbrook and Arthur Coyle
- Born: November 4, 1893; Amsterdam, New York, USA
- Died: July 24, 1952 (aged 58); Long Beach, California, USA
- Burial place: Arlington, Virginia, USA
- Military career
- Allegiance: United States
- Branch: Royal Air Force (United Kingdom); Air Service, United States Army
- Service years: 1917 - 1919, also during World War II
- Rank: Brigadier general
- Units: Royal Air Force: No. 9 Squadron RAF; Air Service, United States Army: 1st Aero Squadron
- Conflicts: World War I World War II
- Awards: Distinguished Service Cross with Oak Leaf Cluster
- Other work: Brigadier general during World War II

Arthur Edmund Easterbrook (November 4, 1893 – July 24, 1952) was an American aviator who started his career as a World War I flying ace credited with five aerial victories. During World War II, he held several important positions in the U. S. Army Air Corps.

== Early life ==
Easterbrook came from a military family; his father was Major Edmund P. Easterbrook, of Fort Flagler, Washington. His sister Gladys Easterbrook [1894-1989] married future general J. Lawton Collins.

== World War I ==
Easterbrook was commissioned as a second lieutenant on August 15, 1917. He served originally in 9 Squadron RAF as an observer in Royal Aircraft Factory R.E.8s. He was reassigned to the American 1st Observation Squadron on August 20, 1918. Teamed with pilot William Portwood Ervin in a Salmson 2A2, Easterbrook scored his first aerial victory on October 6, 1918, a double victory on October 8, and his fourth on October 22, 1918. On November 4, 1918, he became one of the war's last aces.

== World War II ==
During World War II, Easterbrook served on the staff of General H. H. Arnold. Easterbrook later commanded the Air Force's Western Training Command, as well as Santa Ana Air Base in California. On August 21, 1946, he retired as a brigadier general.

On January 21, 1950, he sustained serious injuries in a fall from an avocado tree. He was using a wheelchair and living in a Veterans Administration facility until his death by heart failure on July 24, 1952.

== Honors and awards citations ==
Distinguished Service Cross

The Distinguished Service Cross is presented to Arthur Edmund Easterbrook, First Lieutenant (Air Service), U.S. Army, for extraordinary heroism in action near St. Mihiel, France, September 12, 1918. Because of intense aerial activity on the opening day of the St. Mihiel offensive, Lieutenant Easterbrook, observer, and Second Lieutenant Ralph E. De Castro, pilot, volunteered to fly over the enemy's lines on a photographic mission without the usual protection of accompanying planes. Notwithstanding the low-hanging clouds, which necessitated operation at an altitude of only 400 meters, they penetrated 4 kilometers beyond the German lines. Attacked by four enemy machines, they fought off their foes, completed their photographic mission, and returned safely.

Distinguished Service Cross (DSC) Oak Leaf Cluster

The Distinguished Service Cross is presented to Arthur Edmund Easterbrook, First Lieutenant (Air Service), U.S. Army, for extraordinary heroism in action near Exermont and Varennes, France, October 8, 1918. Lieutenant Easterbrook, with Lieutenant Erwin, pilot, successfully carried out a mission of locating our Infantry, despite five encounters with enemy planes. During these encounters he broke up a formation of three planes, sending one down out of control; killed or wounded an observer in an encounter with another formation; and sent a biplane crashing to the ground, besides driving away a formation of two planes and several single machines.

== See also ==
- List of World War I flying aces from the United States

== Bibliography ==
- American Aces of World War 1 Harry Dempsey. Osprey Publishing, 2001. ISBN 1-84176-375-6, ISBN 978-1-84176-375-0.
