= Don Easterbrook =

American professor

Don J. Easterbrook is professor emeritus of Geology at Western Washington University.

== Career ==
Easterbrook was educated at the University of Washington, where he received the BSc in 1958, the MSc in 1959, and the PhD (Geology) in 1962. His doctoral dissertation was entitled Pleistocene Geology of the Northern Part of the Puget Lowland, Washington. He was chairman of the Geology Department at Western Washington University for 12 years.

Easterbrook has conducted geologic research in the North Cascade Range, Puget Lowland, Columbia Plateau, Rocky Mts., New Zealand Alps, Argentine Andes, and various other parts of the world. His research has been funded by the National Science Foundation, U.S. Dept. of Interior, and several other governmental agencies. Dr. Easterbrook has done extensive investigations into climate changes, global warming and global cooling. He investigated as well as the cause of abrupt global climate changes at the end of the last Ice Age. He researched the relationship of 25-30 year glacial and ocean warming and cooling cycles to solar variation and global warming and cooling. He also has analyzed the correlation of Quaternary inter-hemispheric climate changes, radiocarbon marine reservoir values, Holocene glaciation of the Cascade Range, and the Holocene climate changes, otherwise known as The Little Ice Age.

== Climate change ==
In 2006, Easterbrook claimed that, based on past trends, "the current warm cycle should end soon and global temperatures should cool slightly until about 2035", and "the total increase in global warming for the century should be ~0.3 °C, rather than the catastrophic warming of 3–6 °C (37–43 °F) predicted by the IPCC." In 2013, he testified that "global warming ended in 1998." Easterbrook's claims have been contradicted by temperature data.

== Scientific Societies ==
- President of the Quaternary Geology and Geomorphology Division of the Geological Society of America
- Chairman of the 1977 National Geological Society of America meeting
- U.S. representative to the United Nations International Geological Correlation Program
- Associate Editor of the Geological Society of America Bulletin for 15 years
- Associate Editor of the Geomorphology International Journal
- Director of Field Excursions for the 2003 International Quaternary Association Congress
- Founder of the Pacific Coast Friends of the Pleistocene
- Founding member of American Quaternary Association

== Awards ==
- National award for ‘Distinguished Service to the Quaternary Geology and Geomorphology Division’, Geological Society of America
- Lifetime Achievement Award, Northwest Geological Society

== Publications ==
- Don J. Easterbrook (2011). Evidence-Based Climate Science, 1st ed. Elsevier. p. 416. ISBN 978-0-12-385956-3. Elsevier preview, Google preview

== See also ==
- Global warming
- Global warming controversy
