= Erwin R. Bleckley =

Second Lieutenant Erwin R. Bleckley
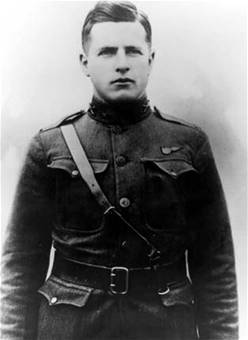
- Medal of Honor recipient Erwin R. Bleckley
- Born: Erwin Russell Bleckley; December 30, 1894; Wichita, Kansas, U.S.
- Died: October 6, 1918 (aged 23); Near Binarville, France
- Burial place: Meuse-Argonne American Cemetery, Romagne-sous-Montfaucon, France
- Military career
- Allegiance: United States
- Branch: United States Army
- Service years: 1917–1918
- Rank: Second Lieutenant
- Units: 130th Field Artillery, 35th Division; 50th Aero Squadron
- Conflicts: World War I: Meuse-Argonne Offensive †
- Awards: Medal of Honor; Junior Military Aviator Badge

Erwin Russell Bleckley (December 30, 1894 – October 6, 1918) was a United States Army aviator during World War I, and posthumous recipient of the Medal of Honor, killed in action on October 6, 1918, near the "lost battalion". Bleckley entered service as a member of the Kansas National Guard, was commissioned as an artillery officer, then volunteered for aviation training and duty. His was one of the four Medals of Honor awarded to members of the Air Service in World War I.

== Background ==
Erwin Bleckley was born in Wichita, Kansas.

=== Enlistment and Air Service duty ===
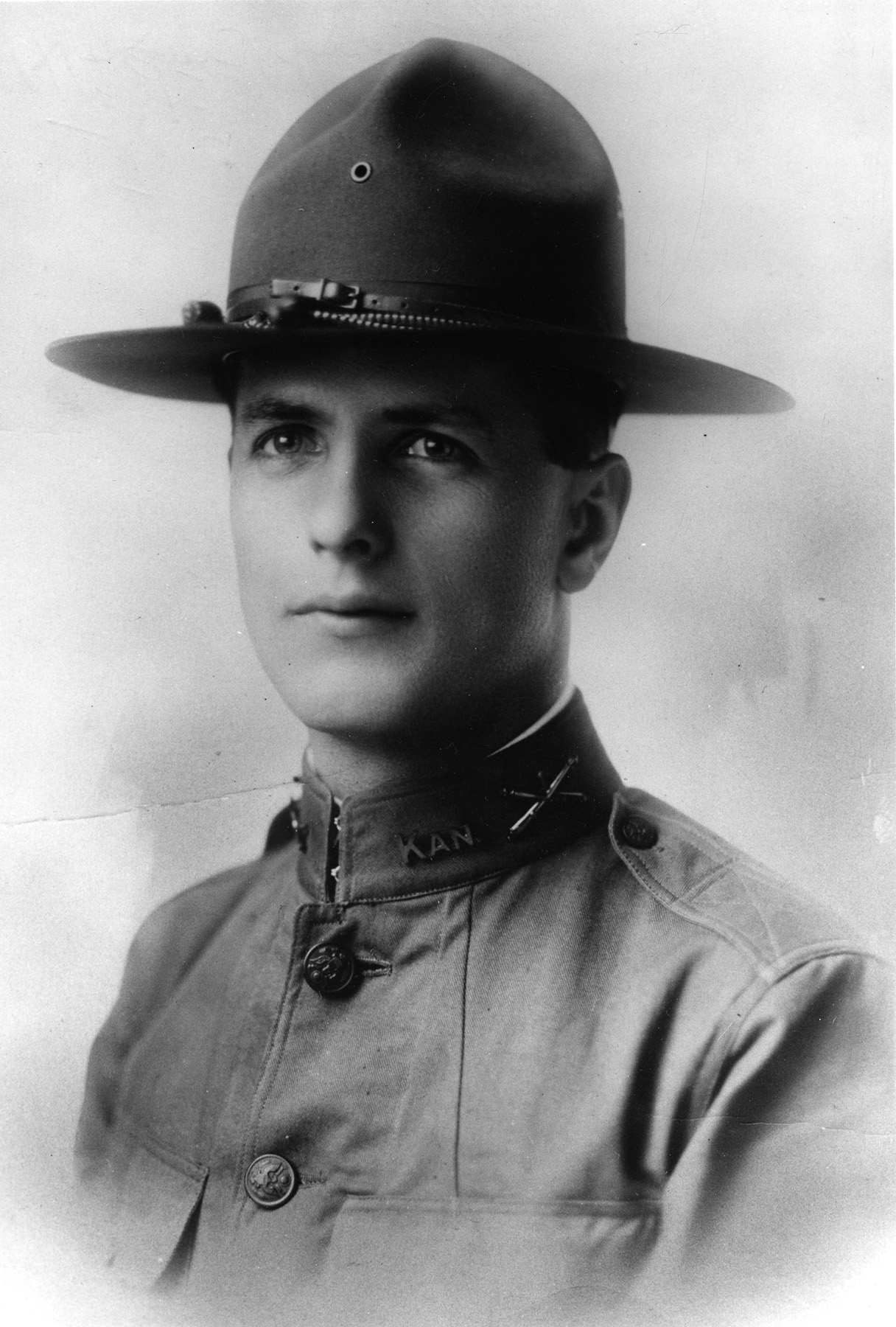
Erwin Bleckley after joining the Kansas National Guard

On June 6, 1917, Bleckley, then a bank teller with the 4th National Bank of Wichita, enlisted as a private in the Kansas National Guard, joining Battery F, 1st Field Artillery, the second man to enlist, according to the unit commander. On July 5, 1917, he was commissioned a second lieutenant in the Field Artillery. A month later, on August 5, his unit was called into Federal service. The 1st Field Artillery was then reorganized into the 130th Field Artillery at Fort Sill, Oklahoma, as part of the 35th Division, National Guard.

Bleckley had expressed a desire to become a pilot, but his family objected and he became an artilleryman. When he arrived in France in March 1918, the Air Service of the American Expeditionary Force, then organizing, announced a need for artillery officers to train as aerial observers. Bleckley volunteered, graduated from the observer school at Tours, France, and was attached to the 50th Aero Squadron on August 14, 1918. At that time the 50th, known as the "Dutch Girl" squadron from the commercial logo of a scouring cleanser painted on the sides of their airplanes, was based at Amanty aerodrome and had 14 pilots, nine observers including Bleckley, and 18 de Havilland DH-4 aircraft, which the crews called "Libertys" after their American-made Liberty engines.

On September 2, 1918, in preparation for the St. Mihiel Offensive, the squadron moved to Behonne aerodrome, near Bar-le-Duc to support the V Corps of the First U.S. Army. However a few days later they were shifted to Bicqueley aerodrome, to provide support to the 82nd and 90th Divisions of the I Corps. While arriving at their new base, the squadron lost a pilot and mechanic killed in a landing accident.

Bleckley, known as "Bleck" and popular in his squadron, flew his first combat mission at 5:30 a.m. Of September 12, 1918, the first day of the offensive, which was the first coordinated, large-scale employment of Air Service airpower. Flying observer for flight leader 1st Lt. Harold E. "Dad" Goettler in aircraft number 2, the mission supported the advance of the 90th Division, and was the first of several that resulted in a recommendation for promotion to 1st lieutenant for Bleckley on September 17.

=== The Lost Battalion ===
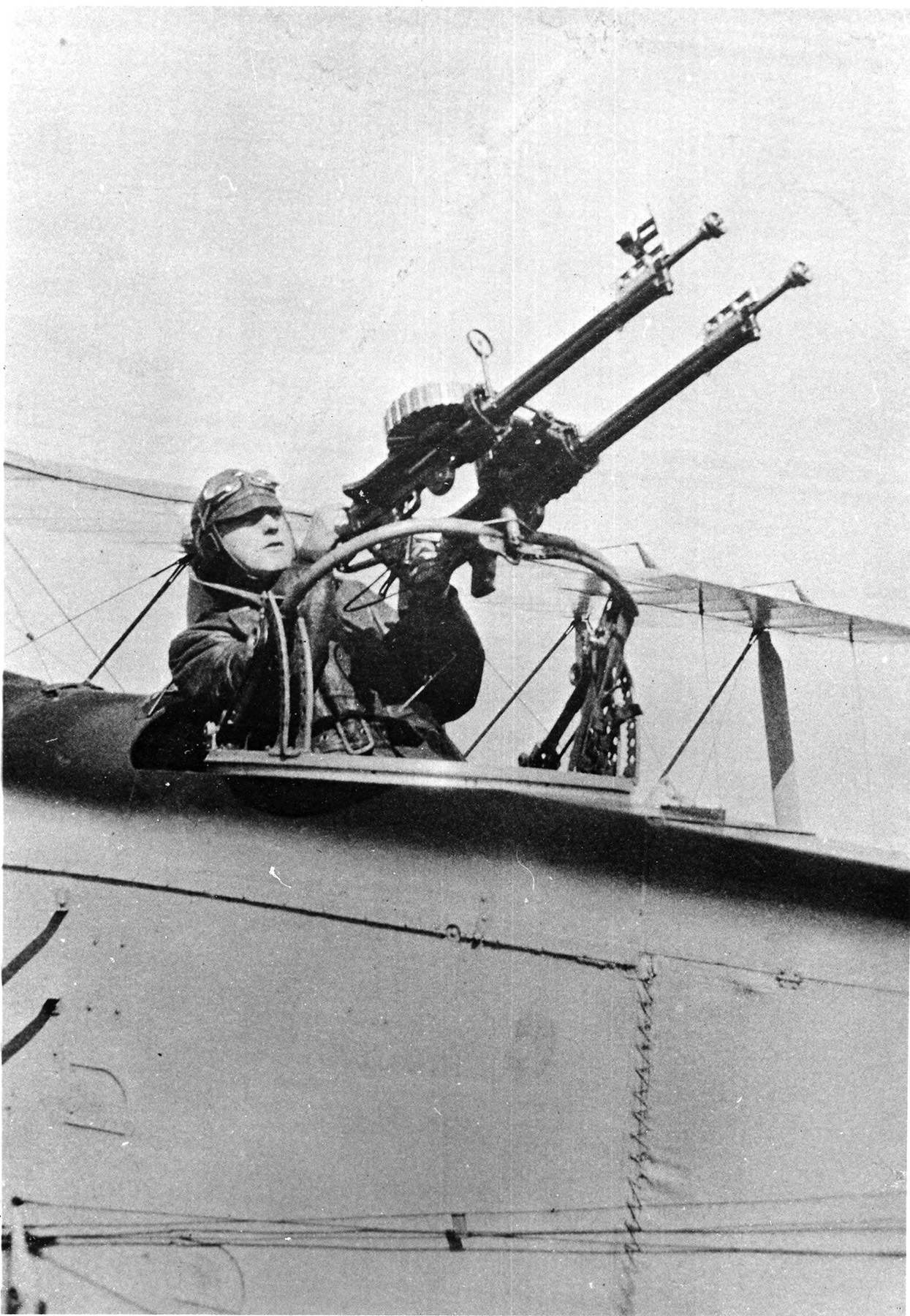
Second Lt. Erwin R. Bleckley, a U.S. Army Air Service observer

On September 24, the squadron again relocated, this time to Remicourt, aerodrome of the I Corps Observation Group. On September 26, 1918, supporting the 77th Division, the 50th Aero Squadron flew its first missions of the Meuse-Argonne Offensive with a complement of 15 pilots, 15 observers, and 16 Liberties. At the beginning of October, units of the 308th Infantry Regiment were cut off and surrounded by German troops. Able to communicate with division headquarters only by carrier pigeon, the battalion-sized force inadvertently supplied division headquarters with incorrect coordinates of its location. As early as October 2 the 50th Aero Squadron searched for signs of the cut-off battalion, and on October 5, the division commander, Maj. Gen. Robert Alexander, requested that the 50th Aero Squadron locate and resupply the "Lost Battalion" by air with ammunition, rations, and medical supplies. Four attempts to pinpoint the location were unsuccessful in increasingly bad weather.

On October 6, the 50th flew 13 additional missions, ultimately having three aircraft shot down, in what the USAF has termed the first combat airlift in history. In addition to supplies, the 50th attempted to drop two baskets of carrier pigeons to the 308th, using small parachutes from flares to soften the descent. The first resupply mission, flown by Lt.s Floyd M. Pickrell and Alfred C. George, took off shortly before noon in poor visibility. The DH-4 of Lt.s Maurice F. Graham and James E. McCurdy returned from the last mission with McCurdy seriously wounded by a bullet through the neck, but also with confirmation that the location given by the lost battalion was incorrect and occupied by German forces.

== Medal of Honor mission ==
On the early afternoon of October 6, 1918, flying again with Goettler, Bleckley took off to try to locate the "Lost Battalion". After completion of their first mission, they returned to Remicourt with numerous holes in the aircraft from small arms fire, and problems with their spark plugs that had been plaguing the DH-4s for several days. Warned by squadron commander Capt. Daniel P. Morse that a second sortie would be exceedingly more difficult and hazardous, Bleckley was quoted: "We'll make the delivery or die in the attempt!"

Late in the afternoon, the pair flew a second resupply mission in aircraft number 6, borrowed from Lt. Pickrell when their own was not serviceable. A history of Wichita, Bear Grease, Builders, and Bandits by Beccy Tanner (1991), gives eyewitness descriptions of what followed: "Goettler skidded his plane, he made turns, he side-slipped a little occasionally, he climbed and then dived. Each time the plane turned and its great mottled belly flopped back into normal position, the men of the lost battalion expected to see it tumble from the sky... But on its way it went like a charmed thing, roaring up and down and across, rocked occasionally by the ash of big shells that had just passed... the plane finally crashed into the French terrain."

The DH-4 flew low, just above the tree tops, cresting hilltops and descending into a ravine in which the Germans could shoot down at the aircraft. The attempt to draw fire to pinpoint German positions would help find the battalion by the process of elimination. By flying low the attempts to drop supplies into an area 350 by 50 yards where the battalion was believed to be dug in would be more precise. Even so, much of the resupply was recovered by German troops, and the aircraft came under intense and accurate fire from German machineguns and rifles. Goettler was struck in the head by a bullet and killed. The DH-4 crashed inside Allied lines, and Bleckley was thrown from the plane and severely injured. Unconscious, he was rescued by French soldiers, and rushed by automobile to a hospital, but died en route of internal injuries suffered in the crash.

Morse successfully recommended both men for the Distinguished Service Cross, two of the six received by aviators of the squadron. The awards were upgraded to the Medal of Honor by the Decoration Board in 1922. The medal was presented to Bleckley's parents at the Wichita Forum on March 23, 1923. Maj. Gen. C. B. Duncan, commander of the 7th Corps Area, pinned the medal on the lapel of Bleckley's father, Col. Elmer E. Bleckley, a former railroad agent with the Missouri Pacific Railroad and Vice President of the 4th National Bank. The Kansas National Guard was presented with a painting of the DH-4 and Bleckley moments after the crash, which depicts him as conscious but near death, handing a bloody paper containing the location of the Lost Battalion to French soldiers. However the version appears to be part of the Lost Battalion mythology with no evidence to date to support it.

== Commemoration ==
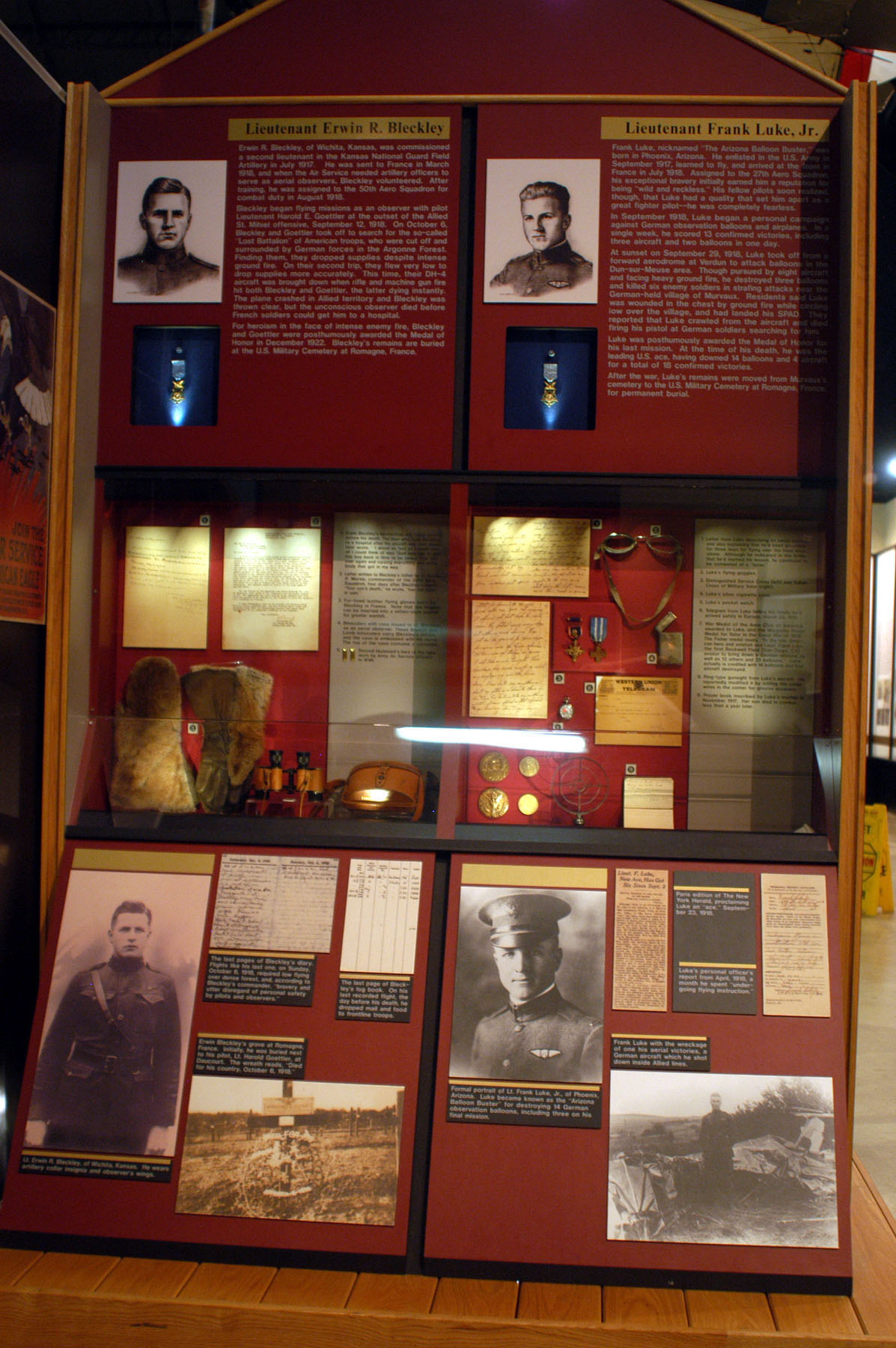
Lt. Erwin Bleckley exhibit at the National Museum of the U.S. Air Force

Following his death, and posthumous selection for the Medal of Honor, his hometown, Wichita, held a public ceremony for the military to present the medal to his parents, on March 4, 1923, at the Wichita Forum arena, with an estimated 5,000 citizens attending.

Bleckley was commemorated by the city of Wichita, his hometown, in 1932 with the naming of a street named Bleckley Drive (which still exists), at the request of the American Legion. Following the war, his remains were permanently buried in the Meuse-Argonne American Cemetery and Memorial east of the village of Romagne-sous-Montfaucon, France. Bleckley's family donated his Medal of Honor to the National Museum of the United States Air Force in Dayton, Ohio. The original copy of the award document is located in the Museum of the Kansas National Guard in Topeka, KS along with other personal momentoes and personal items belonging to Lt. Bleckley.

Bleckley was inducted into the Kansas National Guard Hall of Fame in 1997.

A monument commemorating Bleckley and Goettler's final flight was erected on October 7, 2009, in Remicourt, ninety-one years and one day after they were killed.

In the 2020s, in his hometown, Wichita, the Bleckley Airport Memorial Foundation (BAMF) was established to commemorate his memory, and to develop a permanent public memorial display, honoring Bleckley, at Wichita's Eisenhower National Airport—with a restored DH-4 airplane (matching the one in which he died), a statue of him, educational displays, and various Bleckley historical memorabilia. While developing the memorial (still in development in early 2024), the group organized various commemorations of Bleckley, and local media have featured him, including documentaries and feature segments on local television.

On March 4, 2023, the 100th anniversary of the 1923 medal-presentation ceremony, a public ceremony commemorating the centennial was held at the Kansas Aviation Museum, with military honors and speeches by BAMF leaders, a Bleckley relative (great-nephew Michael Erwin), Wichita Mayor Brandon Whipple, other dignitaries, and the commander of adjacent McConnell Air Force Base (whose officers' club lounge has been named for Bleckley).

== Medal of Honor citation ==
Rank and organization: Second Lieutenant, 130th Field Artillery, observer 50th Aero Squadron, Air Service. Place and date. Near Binarville, France, October 6, 1918. Entered service at: Wichita, Kans. Birth: Wichita, Kans. G.O. No.: 56, W.D., 1922.

Citation:

2d Lt. Bleckley, with his pilot, 1st Lt. Harold E. Goettler, Air Service, left the airdrome late in the afternoon on their second trip to drop supplies to a battalion of the 77th Division, which had been cut off by the enemy in the Argonne Forest. Having been subjected on the first trip to violent fire from the enemy, they attempted on the second trip to come still lower in order to get the packages even more precisely on the designated spot. In the course of his mission the plane was brought down by enemy rifle and machinegun fire from the ground, resulting in fatal wounds to 2d Lt. Bleckley, who died before he could be taken to a hospital. In attempting and performing this mission 2d Lt. Bleckley showed the highest possible contempt of personal danger, devotion to duty, courage, and valor.

== See also ==
- List of Medal of Honor recipients for World War I
- List of people from Wichita, Kansas
