= First Army Air Service =

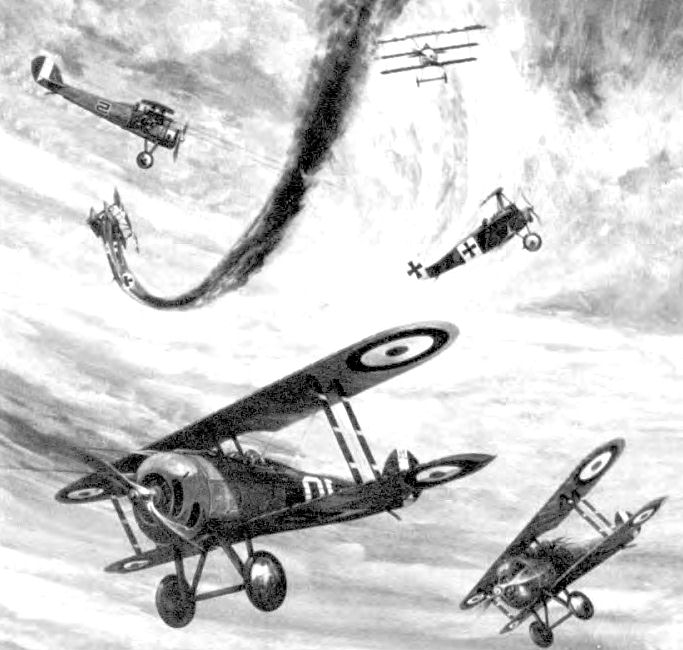
- 1918 lithograph, Air Combat - Western Front
- Active: 10 August 1918 – 15 April 1919
- Country: United States
- Branch: United States Army Air Service
- Type: Air Service
- Role: Command and Control
- Part of: American Expeditionary Forces (AEF)
- Engagements: World War I

The First Army Air Service was an Air Service, United States Army unit that fought on the Western Front during World War I as part of the Air Service, First United States Army. The First Army Air Service was the largest and most diverse Air Service combat organization of the American Expeditionary Forces in France, and most American Air Service combat units were assigned to it when assigned to the front.

The organization was demobilized in France on 15 April 1919 with the demobilization of the United States First Army. It was reconstituted in the Organized Reserve on 15 October 1921 as Headquarters, First Army Air Service, assigned to the First Army and allotted to the First Corps Area. It was then allotted to the Regular Army in 1928, and then inactivated in December 1929.

== History ==
=== Origins ===
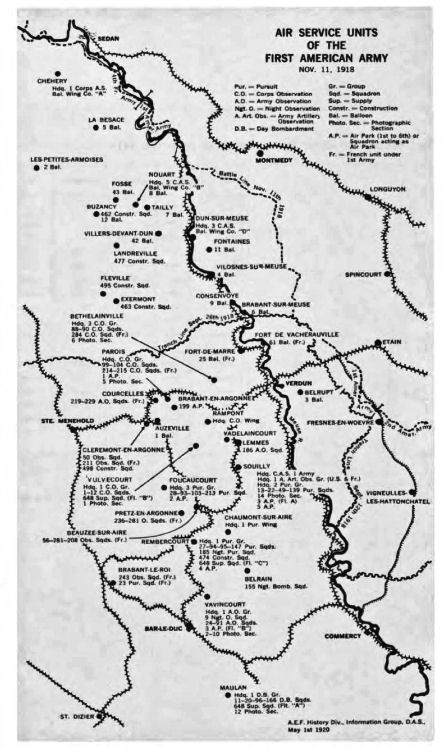
First Army Air Service units and stations

The history of the First Army Air Service dates to the first American Air Service personnel arriving in France. On 15 January 1918, Colonel William Mitchell was appointed Chief of the Air Service, I Corps, First Army. At this time, the I Corps was being formed for the purpose of administratively handling all of the American troops then on the Western Front. Headquarters was located at Neufchâteau, France. When the first American Aero Squadrons arrived at the front in April 1918, they were assigned to the quiet Toul Sector. At this time, the American Air Service on the front consisted of only a few Aero Squadrons of the 1st Pursuit Group.

At the end of June, 1918, Air Service, I Corps moved from the Toul Sector to the Château-Thierry Sector as part of I Corps. The I Corps Observation Group was already in the Chateau-Thierry Sector was under the command of First Army. The Assistant Chief of Air Service, Zone of Advance, felt it was necessary to coordinate the observation groups of First Army with the pursuit groups. On 10 August 1918, the First American Army Air Service was established.

=== Organization ===
The unit was formally organized on 26 August at Ligny-en-Barrois, France. It consisted of the French Aerial Division, which consisted of a large number of pursuit and day bombardment squadrons. In addition, there was one other French pursuit group and three American pursuit groups-one American day-bombardment group-the 1st Army observation, and one French Army artillery group for the adjustment of long-range artillery fire. Eight night-bombardment squadrons of the British Royal Air Force. were to cooperate with the First Army Air Service whenever the tactical situation made such action expedient. The establishment of the First Army Air Service marked the first concentration of American air forces under its own commander.

The front of the First Army, extending from Châtillon-sous-les-Côtes to Pont-sur-Seille, insofar as aviation was concerned, had been very quiet for some time. The enemy performed his photographic reconnaissances with single aircraft, flying at high altitudes, and his pursuit patrols were small and infrequent. In the matter of aerodromes, the enemy was better off than the First American Army, and possessed many small fields within access of any part of the front line. Several aerodromes were unoccupied, and were in such condition that they could be utilized quickly by reinforcements, their barracks and hangars being more or less serviceable.

For the Americans, almost every available field had been taken up and they were short in hangars and billet space, so that by the time the allocation of aviation units had been made to the First Army, the problems of locating and housing the units was a serious one.

==== Corps Observation Groups ====
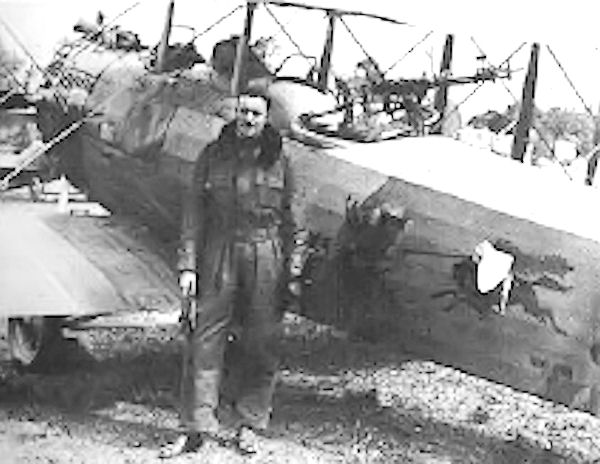
Major John Reynolds, commander of the 91st Aero Squadron, standing next to his Salmson 2.A2 with the Squadron Emblem painted on the side of his aircraft, Gondreville-sur-Moselle Aerodrome, France, 1918

The Corps Air Service of each corps operating under First Army was made up of one squadron for each division and one squadron for the corps. The Air Service of the 2d Colonial Corps consisted entirely of French squadrons. The I Corps observation group was made up of the 1st, 12th, and 50th Aero Squadrons and two French squadrons. In the IV Corps group were the 8th, 135th, and 90th Aero Squadrons and one French squadron. The V Corps group consisted of the 88th, 99th, and 104th Aero Squadrons, only one of which had had a considerable experience in active front-line operations, the corps chief of Air Service and staff remained at the location of the group.

The I Corps group was located in the vicinity of Toul on two aerodromes. The 1st and 12th Aero Squadrons were stationed at Gengault Aerodrome just east of Toul, which had formerly been occupied by the 1st Pursuit Group in the spring of 1918. The 50th Aero and 211th (French) Squadrons occupied the newly constructed Bicqueley Aerodrome, just south of Toul. The IV Corps group entire occupied Ourches Aerodrome. The French squadrons of the Air Service of the 2d French Colonial Corps were located at Rumont, to the northeast of Bar-le-Duc. The V Corps group occupied Souilly Aerodrome. With the exception of the V Corps group, each Corps Air Service was established and ready for operations by the first week in September. The V Corps group was not completed until the day of the Battle of Saint-Mihiel, when the 88th Squadron arrived from the Vesle. The one new squadron of the I Corps group, the 50th Aero, had but recently arrived at the front. It was equipped with Airco DH.4 airplanes with the new Liberty engine. Two of the three American squadrons of the IV Corps group were also equipped with the De Havilland DH.4 Liberty; the 90th Squadron had French Salmson 2.A2 airplanes. In the V Corps group all squadrons were equipped with the Salmson.

==== First Army Observation Group ====
During the inactive period on the Toul sector covering the late spring and summer of 1918 and up to the St. Mihiel offensive which commenced on 12 September, army observation in the American Air Service was carried out by one unit, the 91st Aero Squadron. The 91st served as a nucleus for the long-range reconnaissance missions for First Army; while the various Corps observation groups were used for battlefield, tactical observation missions. Previous to its assignment to the First Army, the 91st worked under orders of the Chef de I'Aeronautique of the 8th French Army. The group added two new aero squadrons, the 24th and the 9th, but as these had not had actual battle experience, they did little work other than perfecting their own training. The 91st Aero Squadron, therefore, took care of all of the long-range day reconnaissances.

==== 1st Day Bombardment Group ====
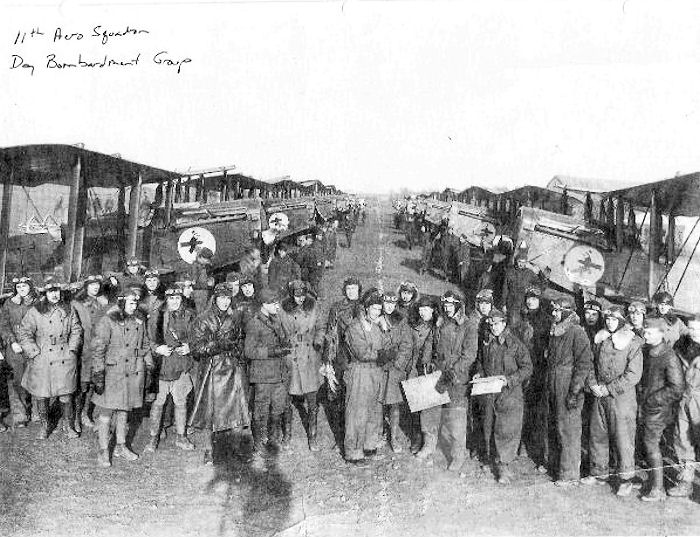
11th Aero Squadron posing with its De Havilland DH.4s (Note "Mr Jiggs" on each fuselage), Maulan Aerodrome, France, November 1918

1st Day Bombardment Group had its beginning 18 May 1918, when the 96th Aero Squadron, the first unit of day bombardment, was established at Amanty Aerodrome to begin active operations against the enemy. The flying equipment of the 96th Squadron consisted of ten Breguet 14B.2 bombing airplanes, equipped with 300 horsepower type 12 F. E. V. Renault motors.

The 1st Day Bombardment Group had a threefold object: the destruction of material, reconnaissance, and observation of enemy tactics in combat. Except during an offensive there was but little opportunity to attack massed troops. The principal mission during such a period was to destroy the enemy's transport lines by which supplies and personnel were delivered to the front, or by which ore and other products of military importance were delivered to the rear. The most favorable targets were the railroad centers where the traffic arteries converged. Long distance raids proved wonderful opportunities for deep reconnaissance, especially of enemy railroad movements. Any pronounced current of railroad traffic, going in one direction, or converging at one point, would be reported by every observer making that particular raid. Further confirmation was unnecessary, for the observers were obliged to submit their written raid reports without consulting each other. Photographs of the bursts often revealed troop and construction activity at the objectives, and were subject to careful interpretation.

==== 1st Pursuit Wing ====
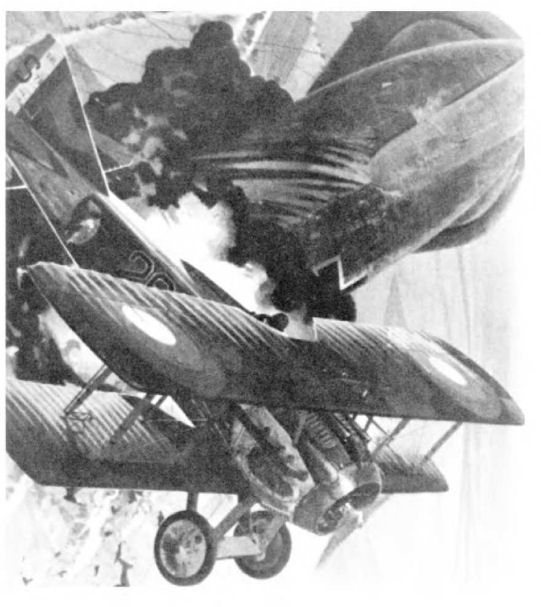
Lithograph of 1st Lieutenant Frank Luke "Balloon Busting", 27th Aero Squadron.

Two American pursuit groups were in process of organization for the establishment of the 1st Pursuit Wing. These were already located at Gengault and Vaucouleurs Aerodromes.

All of the American pursuit squadrons in existence, with the exception of the 17th and 148th Aero Squadrons, which were operating with the British, were concentrated in the 1st Pursuit Wing, with headquarters at Toul, and the 1st Pursuit Group, with headquarters at Rembercourt Aerodrome. The 1st Pursuit Wing consisted of the 2d and 3d Pursuit Groups; the 2d Pursuit Group composed of the 13th, 22d, 49th and 139th Aero Squadrons, and the 3d Pursuit Group consisted of the 28th, 93d, 103d, and 213th Aero Squadrons. The 1st Pursuit Group consisted of the 27th, 94th, 95th, and 147th Aero Squadrons. One French Group (G.C.16) was allocated to the 1st American Pursuit Wing commander for duty in connection with the offensive.

With these units at his disposal, and with the general conditions of the air program for the offensive in mind, the Chief of Air Service, First Army, made certain plans for the pursuit units for the attack. He decided to utilize the American pursuit all along the front for the purpose of protective barrage at all altitudes, with incidental duties as occasion arose, of a more combative nature, such as ground strafing, balloon destruction, and offensive patrols. Offensive patrols cross the enemy line in sufficient strength to cruise over his rear area, search out enemy aircraft, and attack them, with the object of causing maximum casualties and inflicting the greatest possible damage to his air service, and with the further object of obtaining definite moral superiority.

=== St. Mihiel offensive ===
==== Preparation ====
In August 1918, the situation of the enemy in the St. Mihiel sector was approximately the same as that described in Toul sector. The sector of the front from Saint-Mihiel north to Châtillon-sous-les-Côtes was organized in approximately the same manner as the Toul or Saint-Mihiel sector. The enemy was favored by the terrain, which offered many natural positions of great strength. These positions had been well organized for a prolonged defense. Some intimation of an impending allied offensive in this sector had reached the enemy, and immediately preceding the attack of 12 September he commenced a redistribution of his available forces, especially with a view to echeloning them in depth. As far as was known at the time, the enemy strength in the sector remained about the same as it had been throughout the summer months.

In the air the strength of the enemy continued the same as it had been since the previous spring. A few pursuit patrols of Fokker airplanes were reported as operating in this sector, but it was quite probable that these were new airplanes received as replacements for the Albatross and Pfalz type formerly in use. Individual observation and photograph airplanes operated over the sector, but no unusual number of hostile aircraft was at any time encountered or reported before the opening of the Saint-Mihiel offensive.

The operations undertaken during the period of preparation. Visual reconnaissance, Photographic reconnaissance, Artillery fire adjustment, and Exercises with artillery and infantry.

Visual reconnaissance of the corps and division sectors was carried out as a routine matter at dawn and twilight of each day. A few other special visual reconnaissance missions were dispatched to secure information of a particular nature in well-defined areas. The work of visual reconnaissance was valuable only in that it kept the command informed at all times of the situation in the enemy lines opposite each corps. The information secured in this manner was for the most part of a negative nature, due to the inactivity of the enemy at this period, but it served the purpose of assuring the staff of each corps that there were no new developments in the general tactical situation.

Photographic reconnaissance, during the period of preparation, consisted for the most part of taking oblique views of the enemy territory immediately opposite the front lines of each corps. This type of photograph proved of great value in the preparation of detailed plans for the attack.

No great amount of adjustment of artillery fire took place, due to the necessity of veiling all preparations for the offensive. The shoots executed were therefore merely those necessary to register the fire of a few batteries on certain points.

Exercises were conducted as frequently as possible in each corps for the purpose of preparing the infantry and artillery to cooperate successfully with the airplane observer during the coming offensive. All operations were greatly hindered by the unfavorable weather which prevailed during the early days of September.

The 1st Day Bombardment Group was formed two days before the offensive opened, and included the 11th, 20th, and 96th Aero Squadrons. The 11th and 20th Squadrons had not completed their squadron organization. Some of their pilots and observers had seen action with the French squadrons, but most of them made their first flights over the lines during this offensive. The two new squadrons operated De Havilland DH.4 airplanes, with Liberty motors. The armament was the same as that of the French Breguet, save that the pilot had two Marlin machine guns, synchronized to shoot through the propeller. The De Havilland DH.4s carried the British Wimperis bomb sight attached to the outside of the fuselage. This sight permitted the observer to aim at the target while standing, a position which kept him in readiness to fight off an attack by hostile aircraft.

During the period preparatory to the attack, from 29 August to 12 September, the 1st Pursuit Wing, working on the front between the Meuse and the Moselle Rivers, maintained patrols sufficient to prevent any reconnaissance, visual or photographic, of the area Lionville, Beuconville, Domeurs, Francheville, Becq and Gironville. The Wing commander divided the sector for this purpose into two areas, the western running from St. Mihiel to Essey, both inclusive, and the eastern, Seicheprey to Pont-sur-Seille, both inclusive, and gave orders that a double tier barrage should be maintained from daylight to dark over these sectors. The low patrol, acting at from 2,500 to 3,500 meters, and the higher patrol at from 3,500 to 5,500 meters. Each patrol overlapped by 15 minutes, and were not permitted to penetrate over the enemy lines more than five kilometers. By 5 September, the wing had made an area approximately 5 kilometers over the enemy's lines practically safe for corps observation machines to operate. Some close protection work was ordered to act in cooperation with the army reconnaissance squadron, and one particularly dangerous balloon near Mont Sec was attacked repeatedly.

==== Operations ====
The St. Mihiel offensive is chiefly remarkable in that it was the first all-American large scale operation of World War I. During the four days of the American offensive which cleared the St. Mihiel salient of the enemy, weather conditions, except on 14 September, were such as to greatly hinder the carrying out of aerial operations.

===== Tactical Reconnaissance =====
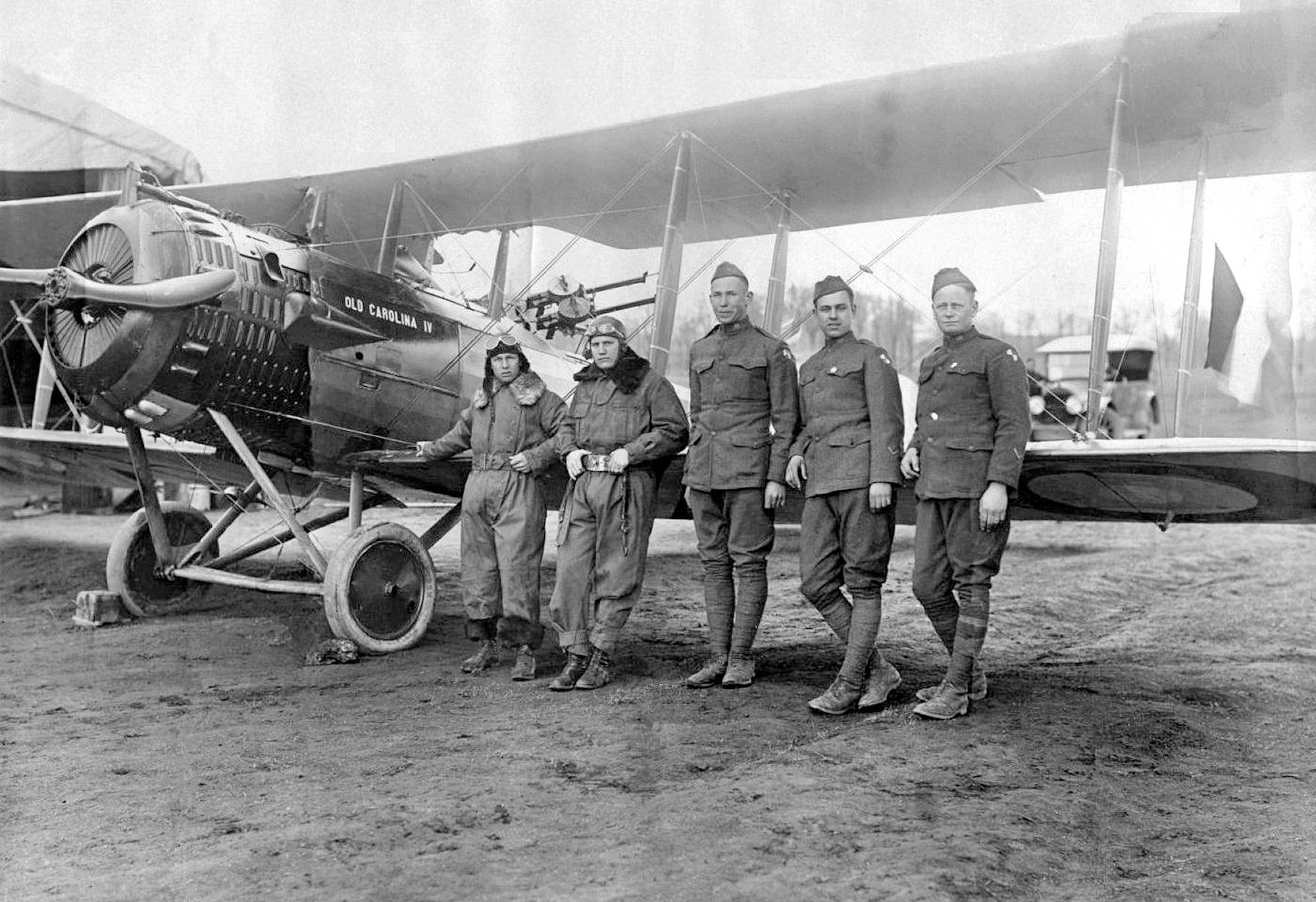
12th Aero Squadron Salmson 2.A2, Julvecourt Aerodrome, France, November 1918

On the morning of 12 September, when the attack was launched, a heavy mist, low-lying cloud banks, and intermittent rain combined to make all aerial observation extremely difficult. Notwithstanding this fact, command airplanes for the corps and divisions, infantry contact patrols, and artillery surveillance airplanes performed their respective missions throughout the hours of daylight. The command was thus kept informed of the general progress of the battle and at periodic intervals was given the first line of our advancing troops located by observers executing the missions of infantry contact. Missions operating in cooperation with the artillery were unable, on account of atmospheric conditions, to accomplish much work of value in the regulation of artillery fire on fugitive targets, but, taking advantage of momentary gaps in the clouds and mist, they were able to observe and report upon the location of such targets from time to time and to furnish other information of considerable value to the artillery. The work accomplished on 13 September was virtually a repetition of that of the 12th, for the same unfavorable weather conditions continued.

14 September was the one day during the offensive which was favorable for the conduct of aerial operations by the Corps Air Service. Missions of every type were dispatched, throughout the hours of daylight. Command airplanes, infantry contact patrols, and visual reconnaissance missions kept the command well informed as to the progress of the attacking troops and of the situation within the enemy lines to a depth of 8 kilometers. Photographic missions were executed and resulted in a large number of successful photographs of the enemy's front-line positions. Artillery surveillance airplanes secured much valuable information which was immediately sent by radio to the artillery posts of command and later confirmed by both dropped messages and telephonic reports upon the return of the observer to the aerodrome. Some successful adjustments of the fire of designated batteries upon fugitive targets located in the enemy lines were accomplished. From early morning of the 14th there was a very noticeable increase of hostile pursuit aviation. Some of the best enemy flights operated along the sector and observation airplanes were repeatedly attacked, but in the majority of cases successfully defended themselves and accomplished their assigned missions. On 15 September, unfavorable weather again greatly hindered aerial operations; the work done was similar to that accomplished during the first two days of the offensive.

===== Strategic Reconnaissance =====
Targets were indicated by the Chief of Staff, First Army for strategic reconnaissance missions deep behind German lines to be carried out by the First Army Observation Group. These targets were various artillery objectives, to be photographed just before and on every day during the attack until further notice. A continuous barrage of observation planes was to be maintained over enemy territory throughout the entire day. Formations of three planes were scheduled to leave the aerodrome at intervals of two hours, beginning at daybreak, to reconnoiter the enemy's rear areas. It was considered necessary to employ formations of at least three planes, as there was no pursuit protection available and the friendly pursuit patrols did not penetrate the enemy lines to the same depth that the army reconnaissance planes were required to go. It was certain all these planes would be vigorously attacked by enemy aircraft.

However, owing to the prevailing adverse weather conditions, it was necessary to disregard the schedules that were prepared the preceding day as the low hanging clouds rendered formation flying impossible. Photography was out of the question. Single planes were dispatched whenever the weather permitted. The planes were required to fly at low altitudes, under the clouds but proved successful, in that they could climb into the clouds and to safety in case of the appearance of enemy aircraft, or when especially heavy and accurate anti-aircraft fire was encountered. During the first day the enemy territory was successfully reconnoitered to a depth of 60 kilometers. Not one mission was carried out at an altitude exceeding 1,000 meters. This was accomplished without the loss of a single plane or even a single casualty. However, because of the rapid increase in numbers of enemy pursuit planes as the battle progressed, the successful reconnoitering of the enemy back areas became extremely difficult. The reinforcing enemy pursuit was largely equipped with the Fokker D VII scouts. This plane had a considerable advantage in climbing speed over the Salmson. However, the horizontal speed of the latter plane was greater at high altitudes, thereby enabling it to break off a combat at any desirable time. The effective work done and the comparatively small number of casualties suffered during the St. Mihiel offensive, gave evidence of the excellent training and experience gained during the previous three months.

===== Day Bombardment =====
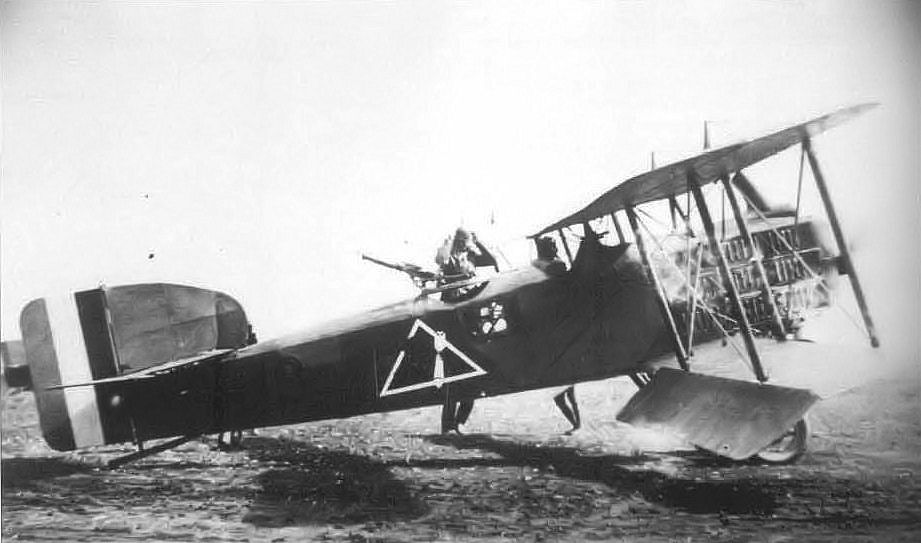
Breguet 14B.2 bomber of the 96th Aero Squadron

Bombing operations during the offensive were directed against hostile troops concentrations immediately behind the enemy's lines as primary objectives, and raids to railroads centers which were congested with troops and supplies as secondary objectives. To interfere with traffic of reinforcements and supplies from the sector east of the Moselle river it was found expedient to send bombing expeditions against the bridges, and bridgeheads, between Pont-a-Mousson and Metz. The main object of day bombardment during the offensive was to throw into confusion and destroy enemy troops marching into, or retreating from battle. During the days of exploitation the bombers continued to hamper as much as possible the enemy's withdrawal of personnel and material.

Late at night, 11 September, orders were received to hold the 9th Aero Squadron on the alert early in the morning, to bomb and machine gun hostile troops in front of our advancing infantry. To carry out these orders the twelve available Breguets were divided into flights of four each. The plan was to send the flights over to attack at 30-minute intervals, and thus keep up the enemy troops under a continuous bombardment. The first order to raid was received at 10 a.m. The objective was troop concentration at Buxieres, in the town and along the roads radiating from it. Because of the strong wind and the low cloud ceiling it was considered impracticable to attempt even these small formation flights. Consequently, that the order be obeyed, the leading team of the first flight volunteered to attempt the mission alone, and to determine, if possible, the best method of conducting troop bombing under the existing unfavorable conditions. The team did not return. It was later learned that the Breguet came down in flames south of Commercy, while returning to the aerodrome. The mission had been accomplished. After this first loss of the offensive it was decided to send all the airplanes on single missions, and not dissipate the strength of the squadron in small formations.

The casualties of the bombers were heavy. The 96th Aero Squadron lost sixteen pilots and observers during the first four days of the attack, which is a high percentage of loss even in a day bombardment unit. The 11th Aero Squadron lost twelve of its flying personnel, and the 20th Aero Squadron three. The total casualties of the group for the offensive numbered thirty-one. However, the work done by day bombardment during the St. Mihiel offensive is worthy of praise. The terrific weather made formation flying, upon which bombing depends, almost impossible. The muddy flying field caused so many broken propellers that the formations which crossed the lines were never large enough for self-protection. The main lesson learned from this offensive was that large formations must be employed by day bombardment when the enemy aircraft opposition is strong and persistent. As it was impossible to obtain sufficient replacements in airplanes and spare parts the formations were small and the losses heavy.

===== 1st Pursuit Wing =====
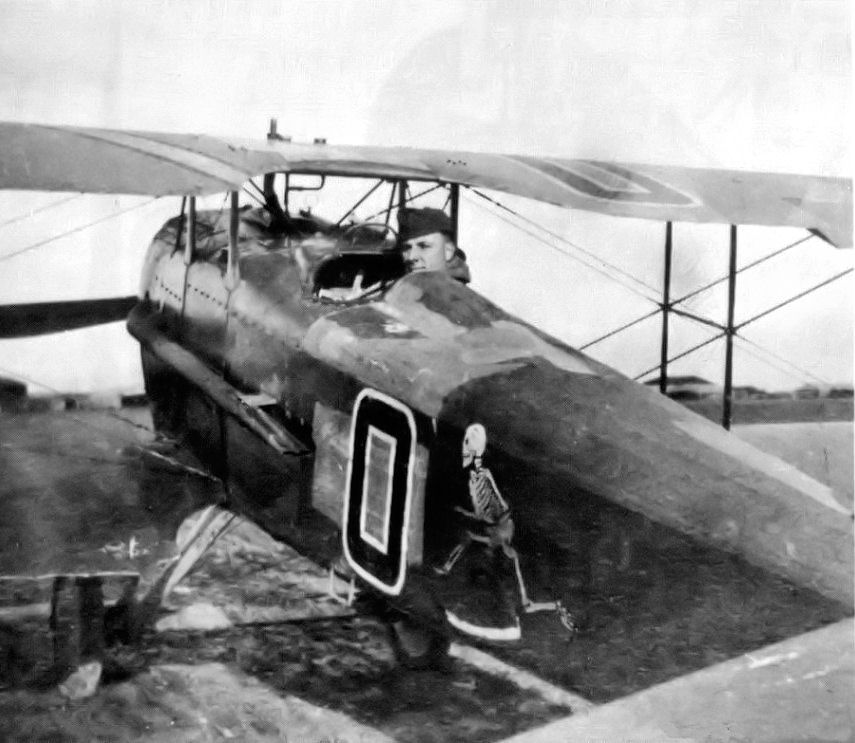
13th Aero Squadron - SPAD XII

On 12 September, throughout the day there were high winds, and rain fell intermittently. The usual functions of the pursuit aviation could not be performed, but the pursuit planes were used to secure valuable information and to harass by machine-gun and bombs the retreating enemy. Many favorable objectives presented themselves, especially over the Vigneville-Chambley and the Vigneulles St. Benoit roads. The 3d Pursuit Group, equipped its airplanes with bombs, and an these roads, together with assistance of the machine guns of the 2nd and 1st Pursuit Groups, constantly threw into confusion the retreating German forces. Owing to weather conditions on the opening day, few large patrols were used, and many individual reconnaissances were made by pursuit pilots of the lst, 2d and 3d Group. Often single aircraft determined and reported the advance of our front line, actually flying down to 50 meters, and co-operating with the troops on the ground.

By 13 September, shortly after midnight, infantry patrols from the south and those from the west met near Vigneulles. Still the enemy was in retreat. The Chambley, Mars-la-Tour road was jammed with his reinforcements coming up and his wagons in retreat. In one day the 3d Pursuit Group made five expeditions bombing and harassing with machine guns, protected by elements of the 2nd Pursuit Group. The 1st Pursuit Group on its sector harassed the infantry, maintaining protective patrols above at different altitudes. But, it was not until 14 September, when the weather cleared, that pursuit aviation was able to operate at its normal altitude. Enemy Balloons were attacked with determination, and massed enemy troops withdrawn on 12, 13 and 14 September were harassed and repeatedly thrown into confusion. Large enemy formations of aircraft when they appeared were fought gallantly even by inferior members, and every opportunity of making observations from pursuit planes was seized with eagerness.

=== Meuse-Argonne Offensive ===
==== Reorganization ====
Shortly after the conclusion of the St. Mihiel offensive a certain redistribution of units took place between the various Corps Air Services in preparation for the Meuse-Argonne Offensive. The three American Army Corps which were to take part in the main offensive were the I, III and V. The IV Corps was to be enlarged to include the former sector of the I Corps. The IV Corps, the 2d French Colonial Corps, and the 33d French Corps were to remain in place and not take part in the main offensive.

One American Aero squadron was relieved from the Air Service of the IV Corps, leaving the 8th and 135th Aero Squadrons and one French squadron in the group at Ourches Aerodrome. The Air Service of the 2d French Colonial Corps was composed of the same squadrons as had participated in the St. Mihiel offensive. The Air Service of the 33d French Corps was made up of French squadrons with headquarters at Beauzee.

The III Corps Observation Group was located on the aerodromes at Souilly Aerodrome, Vavincourt Aerodrome, and Beauzee Aerodromes. The group comprised the 88th and 90th Aero Squadrons and three French squadrons. The V Corps Observation Group included the 99th and 186th Aero Squadrons and two French squadrons. The V Corps Observation Group was established at Foucaucourt Aerodrome. The I Corps Observation Group, located at Remicourt Aerodrome, was made up of three American squadrons, the lst, 12th, and 50th Aero Squadron, and one French squadron.

The 1st Day Bombardment Group was used to attack from high altitudes, large objectives such as towns and railroad stations from which traffic is radiating. In situations when intelligence received that specially favorable targets are presenting themselves within 6 or 8 kilometers of our front lines, this group was ordered to attack such targets at low altitude in order to cause confusion and material damage to enemy elements arriving as reinforcements or retreating.

The enemy air service was largely concentrated in the Conflans-Briey area, and the period between 14 and 25 September was marked by severe and repeated combats. Between 20 and 23 September, the 2d, and 3d Pursuit Groups of the 1st Pursuit Wing changed station[, but this changing station was not allowed to interfere with operations which were still carried on over the front created by the St. Mihiel battle. The 1st Pursuit Group remained at Rembercourt Aerodrome but it too confined its operations to the sector east of the Meuse. G.C. 16 of the French Army was relieved from duty with the 1st Pursuit Wing. The wing headquarters moved from Toul to Chaumont-sur-Aire; the 2d Pursuit Group moved from Gengault Aerodrome to the Belrain Aerodrome, and the 3d Pursuit Group moved from the Vaucouleurs Aerodrome to the Lisle-en-Barrois Aerodrome. The wing headquarters and its groups perfected liaison with the corps air service, the army observation group, and the armies to the right and left of the 1st Army.

For the Argonne-Meuse offensive, the 1st Pursuit Group was allotted the rather new task of combating enemy battle flights and of destroying balloons. In other words, all of its operations were confined to extremely low altitudes during the morning hours. However, its squadrons were available for an offensive operation in the afternoon, and vice versa. The group assigned to patrol in the afternoon will be on the alert in the morning to carry out an offensive operation, in which the entire group may be called upon to participate at medium and high altitudes, penetrating about 12 kilometers beyond our advancing lines to clean the air of enemy aviation.

The 2d and 3d Pursuit Groups were assigned the mission to maintain protective patrols within the enemy's lies for the defense of our army corps air service and to attack enemy reconnaissance planes, but it will also be necessary from time to time to take the offensive with a display of dominating force, sending out powerful expeditions so as to cover intermediate and high altitudes and to sweep the air clear of enemy aviation up to a depth, 10 or 12 kilometers inside the lines. Most of the enemy aviation is concentrated in the region of Metz, especial attention will be paid to the sector between the Meuse and Chatillon.

==== Operations ====
The unfavorable weather encountered during the St. Mihiel Offensive continued the greater part of the time between 26 September and 11 November. There were occasional ideal flying days, but for the most part weather conditions were poor to impossible and proved a great handicap in carrying out aerial operations. Haze and fog obscured the ground to a great extent in the early morning and late afternoon during the last four weeks of the offensive.

===== Tactical Reconnaissance =====
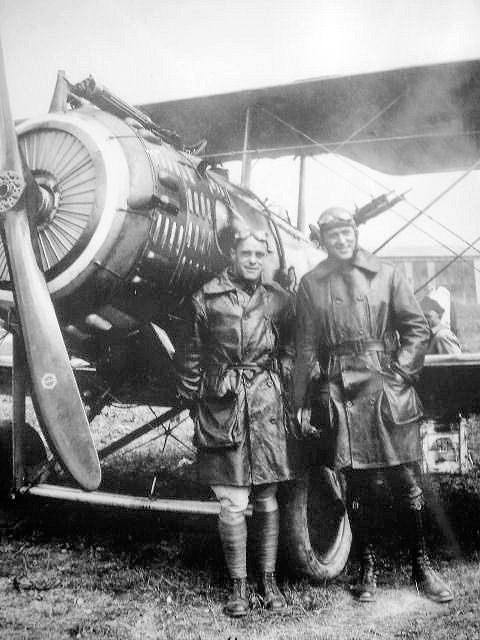
Capt James E. Meredith, commander 99th Aero Squadron next to his Salmson 2.A2 at Luxeuil-les-Bains Aerodrome, France, July 1918

In considering the work performed by the Corps Observation Groups these weather conditions must be kept in mind as an element which affected the execution of each type of mission. In the matter of reconnaissance and infantry contact patrol work they produced some radical departures from the methods ordinarily used.

The photographic missions undertaken during the period from 26 September to 11 November were in almost every case confined to the taking of photographs of well-defined areas of particular interest to the G-2 section of the corps and Army staffs. Atmospheric conditions were so infrequently favorable to the taking of large numbers of photographs that those possible were necessarily directed to cover areas of the most immediate interest to the staff. A considerable number of missions were devoted to the securing of oblique photographs, as had been the case during the preparation of the St. Mihiel offensive. Such photographs were of value particularly with respect to the preparation of plans for the advance of the divisional infantry. At other times, it became necessary to photograph certain sensitive points in the enemy territory. Such missions, which require the greatest care, were assigned to flying teams of long experience. To attain success in them it was necessary that both pilot and observer be thoroughly familiar with the exact locality to be photographed so that no mistake would be made in securing photographs of the exact points desired. Unfavorable weather prevailed, to such an extent that it was never practical to attempt to photograph all the area of the front lines as fast as the troops advanced.

In this offensive, as had been the case on the Marne, photographic missions were invariably given protection against attacking hostile pursuit airplanes. The large number of enemy pursuit flights operating in the sector made it practically certain that a photographic mission would be attacked one or more times during the course of the flight. Protection by pursuit patrols from the nearest pursuit group was utilized to a large extent by photographic missions dispatched from the III Corps Observation Group, and with excellent results. On the other hand, the missions of a like nature sent out from the I and V Corps groups employed for the most part biplace protection offered by airplanes from the groups themselves. The pursuit protection, however, ceased to operate close in to the photographic airplane as in the Mame sector. It was found that better results could be obtained by flying a more or less erratic course some 500 meters above the photographic airplane. This method allowed the pursuit airplanes to retain the advantage of their maneuverability and at the same time to assure to the photographic mission considerable protection in the event of attack.

===== Strategic Reconnaissance =====
The attack commenced on the morning of 26 September with ideal weather conditions. On the four days previous low clouds and rain had prevented any effective work from being carried out. This had a decided effect on the first days work, due to lack of familiarity with the terrain. This fact, coupled with the activity of the hostile air forces, interfered greatly with the success of the photographing of the artillery objectives, and to some extent with the visual work.

Weather conditions throughout the whole operations were extremely bad. Only ten days out of the whole period were suitable for army strategic observation. The most was made of the small amount of good weather, and with two-day squadrons operating an immense amount of work was accomplished. The last three days of October being perfect, gave opportunity for very important work to be accomplished in preparation for the attack, which commenced on 1 November. The areas opposite the American front were reconnoitered and photographed thoroughly, but the work was done in the face of intense opposition by hostile aircraft.

One of the most valuable pieces of work carried out during the last three days of October was the photographing of the army artillery objectives at Montmedy, Longuyon, Spincourt, Dommary-Baroncourt and Conflans. The enemy had protected these points by intense antiaircraft barrages, and high patrols of pursuit planes, but in spite of these obstacles, the objectives were photographed both before and after registration fire, allowing the artillery to fire effectively during the attack. The missions assigned varied in character; from verifying reports as to the location of the front lines, to the seeking out of enemy reserves at points where counter-attacks were expected. This work was carried out by single planes flying at extremely low altitudes. The command planes sometimes penetrated hostile territory to a depth of 15 kilometers, and were constantly exposed to heavy machine gun and anti-aircraft artillery fire. They were especially liable to attack by pursuit planes which had every advantage of speed, maneuverability, and position. The strain of flying under these conditions coupled with the necessarily close confinement while awaiting orders, made it necessary that the teams be changed every ten days, and personnel from each of the squadrons in the group were sent out on this work successfully.

===== Night Reconnaissance =====
Night Reconnaissance work promised to bring in valuable information, since most military movements of importance are made at night. In order that it may be performed successfully, perfect conditions of visibility and a highly trained personnel were necessary.

The 9th Aero Squadron was the only night reconnaissance unit in the American Air Service. The poor weather conditions throughout the Argonne-Meuse operation gave little opportunity for the squadron to work. In addition, only a very few of the flyers had been trained for night work. In spite of these handicaps it is only fair to say that on the few nights suitable for observation, information of value was obtained, and considerable damage done to the enemy by bombing.

===== Day Bombardment =====
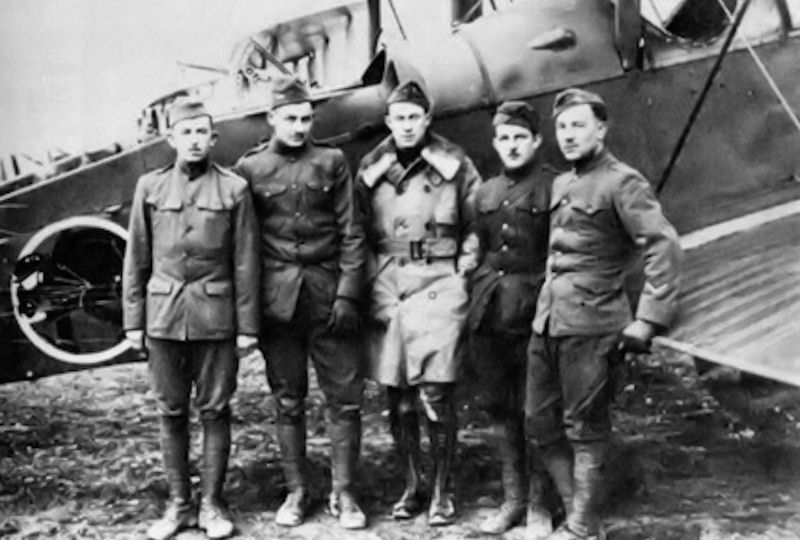
20th Aero Squadron Lieutenant Leslie P. Koepfgen with his crew. From the left: Howard W. Wolf, Marion Lappin, Koepfgen, James W. Mone and Earl G. Crain with Koepfgen's Airco DH.4.

The objectives for bombardment in the Meuse Argonne Offensive were similar to those of the St. Mihiel offensive. The 1st Day Bombardment Group was used to attack, from high altitudes where possible, such towns as Romagne, St. Juvin, Grandpre, Bantheville, and Dun-sur-Meuse, and railroad centers from which traffic was radiating.

Early in the offensive missions were carried out against troop concentrations between the Meuse River and the Argonne forest. When intelligence was received of favorable targets within six or eight kilometers of the lines, the group was ordered to attack such objectives at low altitude to cause the maximum amount of confusion and damage to the enemy elements as reinforcements for retreating before our infantry.

With the increase of formation strength, and improvement in skill of the bombing personnel, the group wrought telling havoc on the objectives of the Argonne-Meuse. Fires were frequently started with incendiary bombs. Due to the incessant cloudy weather most of the early raids were made at an altitude of 1,500 to 2,500 meters. The antiaircraft fire of the enemy was so accurate that the flight leaders found it necessary to fly at least 500 meters below the background of clouds.

4 October was a very successful day for the bombers. Dun-sur-Meuse was hit with a ton and a half of bombs, and Landres St. Georges with a like amount. The combats of the day were severe. In each attack the enemy numbered about thirty Fokkers and Pfalz. The clouds were low and afforded many lurking pockets for the enemy pursuit. In the last flight the 96th Aero Squadron was attacked by the full formation of enemy airplanes. The bombing squadron tightened up and kept the pursuers at bay until the 26th Aero Squadron and 11th Aero Squadron attacked the Fokkers and Pfalz in the rear. Two of the enemy were seen to go down. When the combat was the hottest thirty Spads from the 2d Pursuit Group arrived on schedule time and joined in the general fight. The enemy was in a trap and could not escape combat with all our forces. The Spads brought down eleven of the enemy, bringing the total of victories of the fight up to thirteen.

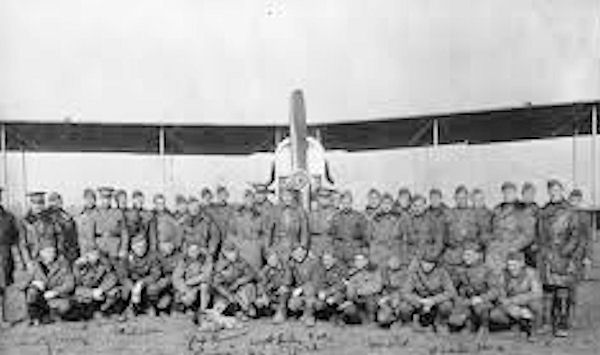
Members of the 166th Aero Squadron in front of a De Havilland DH.4.

Another highly successful raid was the shock attack on Bayonville, 18 October, on which the group dropped four tons of bombs. The bombs burst in the middle of the town. It was later learned that on this single raid 250 of the enemy troops were killed by our bombs and 750 wounded. According to instructions from headquarters the bombing squadrons returned by way of St. Juvin to encourage our infantry. A successful raid was made by the group on Montmedy, 4 November. Numerous fires were started and great damage done to buildings and warehouses.

The hottest combat of the offensive was fought on returning from this mission. Two airplanes of the 11th Aero Squadron went down in flames. Six of the enemy were shot down, two in flames. The last mission of the offensive was a raid on Mousson, on which good hits were made. On this last raid the 20th Aero Squadron lost three planes. Four of the enemy went down in flames or out of control.

During the Meuse-Argonne operations the 1st Day Bombardment Group was distinguished for success in precision bombing. Enemy troops were attacked, material was destroyed, and the morale of the enemy so shaken that formations of bombers became the source of constant dread. Statistics of the air service show that two-thirds of the enemy airplanes brought down, during the offensive, were brought down by, or in conjunction with day bombardment.

===== 1st Pursuit Wing =====
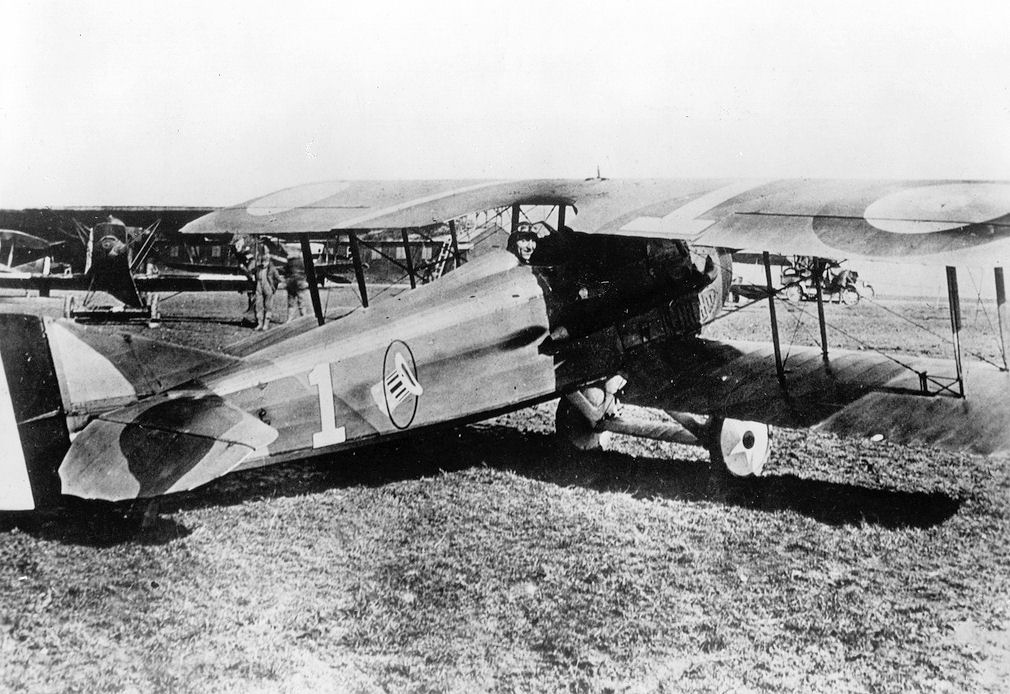
94th Aero Squadron - SPAD XIII

The low work of the 1st Pursuit Group justified its introduction on the first day of the Argonne-Meuse attack, 26 September. Ten enemy balloons were shot down in flames on that date. The constant destruction and harassing of the enemy's balloons by the group resulted in the enemy detailing a certain force at all times for their protection, and he made many ingenious attempts to trap our pilots who were attacking his balloons. This resulted in counter schemes being employed in which not only were attacks on balloons carried out, but a number of enemy airplanes were brought down by the group. While many successful balloon attacks were made in the early morning and throughout the day, the most successful attacks were those carried on in the dusk of the evening.

The 1st Pursuit Group in addition to its attacks on enemy balloons and its defensive work in destroying German battle-planes, was enabled to use shock action at low altitudes by means of a concentrated patrol of all squadrons which was made about three o’clock every afternoon.

The policy employed with respect to the 1st Pursuit Wing of using large forces for shock action deep in the enemy's side of the lines, justified itself on the first day of the American attack in the Argonne Meuse area, 26 September. The first group sortie was made by the 2d Pursuit Group at dawn of 26 September and resulted in the destruction of 8 enemy airplanes. A similar sortie by the 3d Pursuit Group on the afternoon of 26 September resulted in the destruction of 3 more enemy planes.

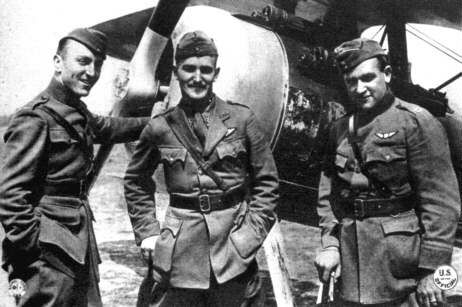
Eddie Rickenbacker, Douglas Campbell, and Kenneth Marr of the 94th Aero Squadron pose next to a Nieuport 28 fighter, 1918.

One of the most successful shock operations carried out by the 1st Pursuit Wing was carried out on 18 October in which two squadrons of the 2d Pursuit Group, equipped with bombs and machine guns for the purpose of harassing group objectives flying at an extremely low altitude, two squadrons of the 3d Pursuit Group at between 2,000 and 3,000 meters, all four squadrons of the 1st Day Bombardment Group at 4,000 meters, and two more squadrons of the 3d Pursuit Group, flying at 4,500 meters, met at the previously appointed rendezvous of Bayonville at 3:30 in the afternoon. The enemy appeared in force, some 30 or 40 enemy planes being seen by our pilots. Their formation was broken up, at least nine of them were destroyed, and the others forced to return to their aerodromes. It is not to be forgotten that throughout the Argonne-Meuse operations both the 2d Pursuit Group and the 3d Pursuit Group were equipped with bombs for use in attacking ground objectives.

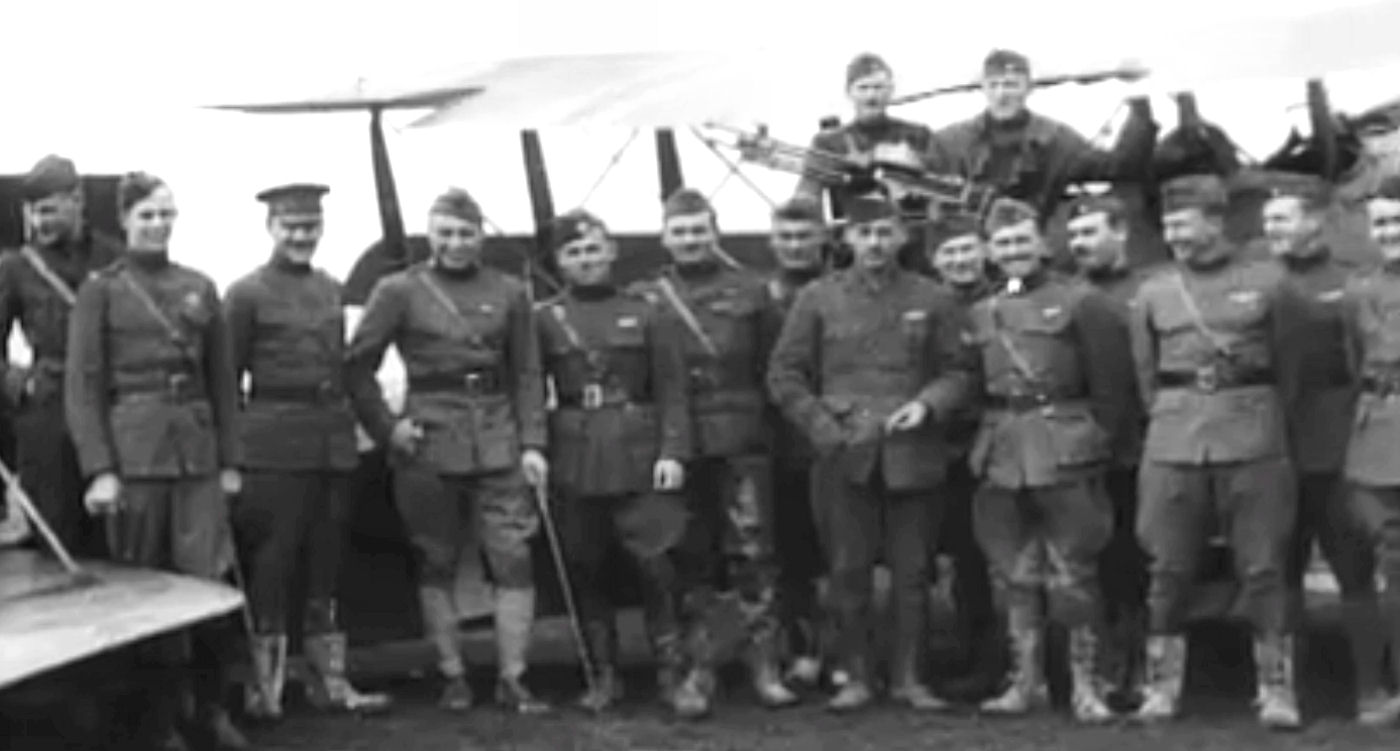
Officers of the 185th Aero Squadron (Night Pursuit), Rembercourt Aerodrome, France, November 1918

During the offensive, a night pursuit squadron (185th Aero Squadron) was added to the 1st Pursuit Group for the purpose of attacking enemy bombers. The details connected with the organization of this service presented a whole series of new and difficult problems which were satisfactorily solved. After the introduction of the night pursuit squadron, very few night bombardment attacks were undertaken by the enemy. In a few cases our night pursuit pilots were able to come within range of the enemy raiders. The night pursuit squadron combined offensive tactics with its defense against enemy bombers, bombs on enemy posts of command and concentration of troops.

In addition to its offensive shock patrols, the 1st Pursuit Wing carried on the more conventional protective patrols for which provision was made in the plan of employment, and also afforded a certain amount of close protection to the army corps observation planes. The imperative necessity of extremely close liaison with the corps air services in the carrying out of these missions was emphasized, and the policy was adopted in October of having the corps observation planes which were to receive close protection from pursuit planes, land on the aerodrome of the pursuit group assigned to give protection, so that the observation airplane crew and the pursuit patrol leader could come to a definite understanding of the work to be done and the methods of doing it.

=== Demobilization and service 1922-29 ===
On 11 November 1918, all offensive flying ended at 11:00 a.m. in compliance with the Armistice with Germany. As part of the Armistice, Allied Forces were to occupy the Rhineland area of Germany beginning on 1 December. The Third Army Air Service was established to be the air component of the United States Third Army. Units from the First Army AS contributed to over half the strength of Third Army AS, consisting of eight Aero Squadrons, and the headquarters of the III Corps Observation Group, and the VII Corps Observation Group.

Partially due to the suddenness of the Armistice, it took several months to demobilize the Air Service in France. An order of precedence based upon length of service on the front had to be made, staging camps for processing the men and personnel, and ships had to be obtained for transporting the men and materiel back to the United States, consisting of men both in the Zone of the Advance (Western Front) as well as in the Services of Supply (Rear Areas). Demobilization of men and units proceeded, until finally, on 13 April 1919, orders were received from the Chief of the Air Service in France that the Headquarters, First Army Air Service was to demobilize. Six Aero Squadrons, amongst the last to arrive at the front, were to be sent to the Rhineland to reinforce or relieve units of the Third Army Air Service, the remainder to proceed to Colombey-les-Belles Aerodrome, France for demobilization.

Headquarters was officially demobilized on 15 April 1919, its men arriving in the United States by the end of May and either were transferred to Air Service units or returned to Civilian life.

The organization was (re)-constituted in the Organized Reserve 15 October 1921 as Headquarters, First Army Air Service, assigned to the First Army and allotted to the First Corps Area. Headquarters initiated in November 1922 at Dover, NH. It was withdrawn from the Organized Reserve and First Corps Area on 5 September 1928 and allotted to the Regular Army. Inactivated on 9 December 1929 at Dover by relief of personnel.

=== Lineage ===
- Organized in France as: First Army Air Service, on 10 August 1918

Demobilized in France on 15 April 1919

=== Assignments ===
- First United States Army, 10 August 1918 – 15 April 1919

=== Components ===
- First Army Observation Group, 6 September 1918 – 15 April 1919
- I Corps Observation Group, 26 August 1918 – 15 April 1919
- III Corps Observation Group, 26 August 1918 – 19 December 1918
- IV Corps Observation Group, 26 August 1918 – 14 October 1918
- V Corps Observation Group, 1 September 1918 – 15 February 1919
- VII Corps Observation Group, 26 August 1918 – 15 April 1919
- 1st Day Bombardment Group, 10 September 1918 – 17 December 1918
- 1st Pursuit Wing, 10 September 1918 – 17 December 1918

=== Stations ===
- La Ferté-sous-Jouarre, France, 10 August 1918
- Ligny-en-Barrois, France, 25 August 1918
- Souilly Aerodrome, France, 21 September 1918 – 15 April 1919

== See also ==
- Organization of the Air Service of the American Expeditionary Force
