= Bicqueley Aerodrome =

World War I airfield in northeastern France

- Part of American Expeditionary Forces (AEF)
- Located near: Bicqueley, France
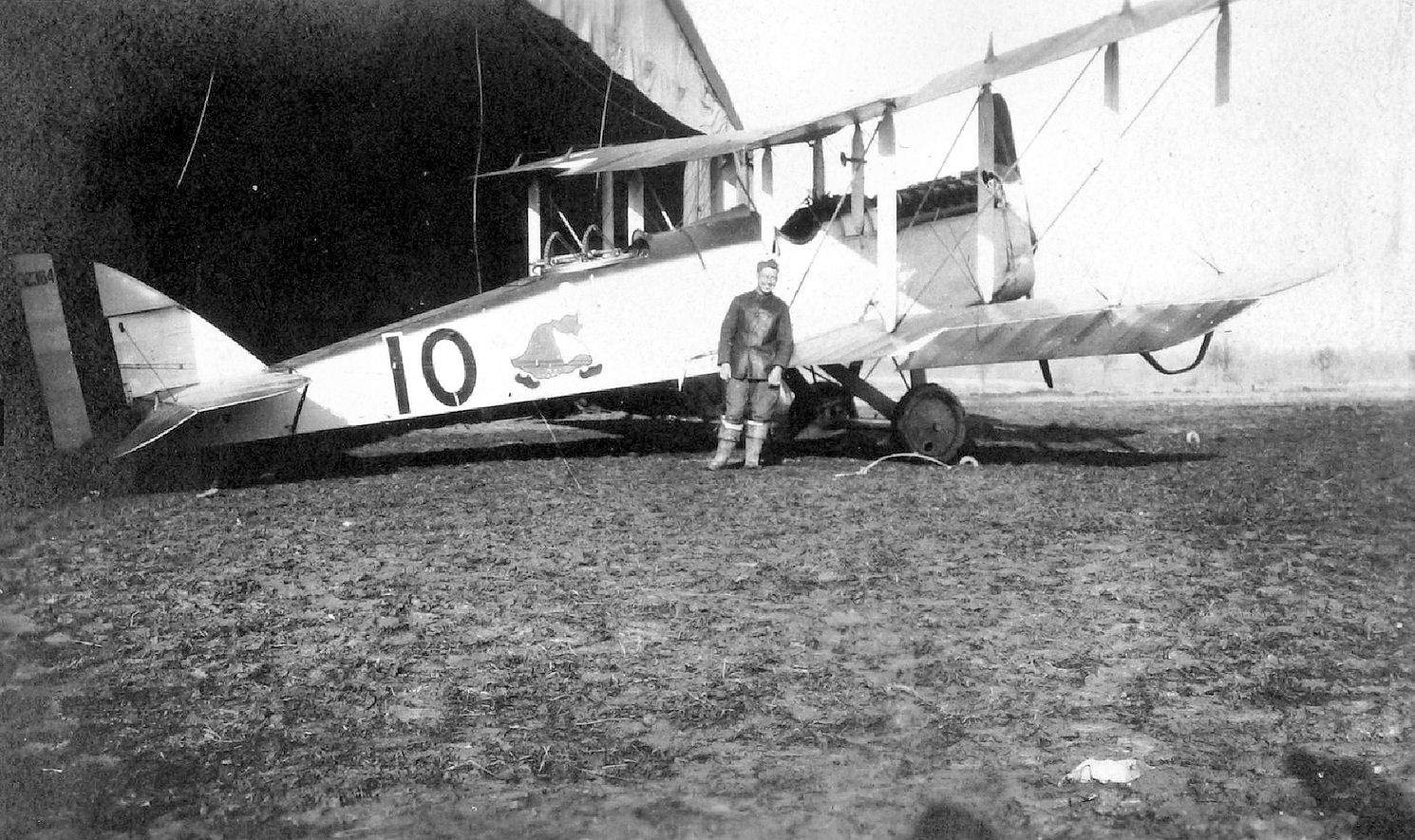
- 50th Aero Squadron Dayton-Wright DH-4 in front of a canvas hangar, Bicqueley Airfield

Site information
- Type: Combat Airfield
- Controlled by: Air Service, United States Army
- Condition: Agricultural area

Location
- Coordinates: 48°37′09″N 005°55′54″E

Site history
- Built: 1918
- In use: 1918–1919
- Battles/wars: World War I

Garrison information
- Garrison: I Corps Observation Group; United States First Army Air Service

Bicqueley Aerodrome was a temporary World War I airfield in France, used both by French units, and by squadrons of the Air Service, United States Army. It was located 1.0 mile (1.6 km) East-Southeast from the commune of Bicqueley, and 5 miles (8.0 km) south of Toul, in the Meurthe-et-Moselle department in northeastern France.

== Overview ==
The airfield was secretly constructed by the 477th Aero Squadron (Construction) in seven days in late August 1918. It had eight French "Bessonneau" aircraft hangars and two British RAF type hangars. The construction also erected eight wooden barracks and 7 other buildings for maintenance shops, headquarters and a small clinic.

First to arrive were two French escadrilles, BR 208 and BR 214, on 6 September, from the French 2nd Army Aviation, and working with the American First Army. They were followed on 8 September by the 50th Aero Squadron (Observation), flying De Havilland DH-4s, from the First Army Air Service's I Corps Observation Group, ready for the heavy push towards Saint Mihiel in the following days.

They had all gone by the end of September, and the airfield was quiet until early November, before the Armistice: two French escadrilles stayed for a few days (BR 218 and BR 228), then giving way the three escadrilles of the "Groupe de Bombardement no 6" which were stationed at Bicqueley until 10 January 1919.

Eventually the land was returned to agricultural use by the local farmers. Today, what was Bicqueley Airdrome is a series of cultivated fields located about one and one-half miles east-southeast of Bicqueley, with no indications of its wartime use.

== See also ==
- List of Air Service American Expeditionary Force aerodromes in France
