= 200th Airlift Squadron =

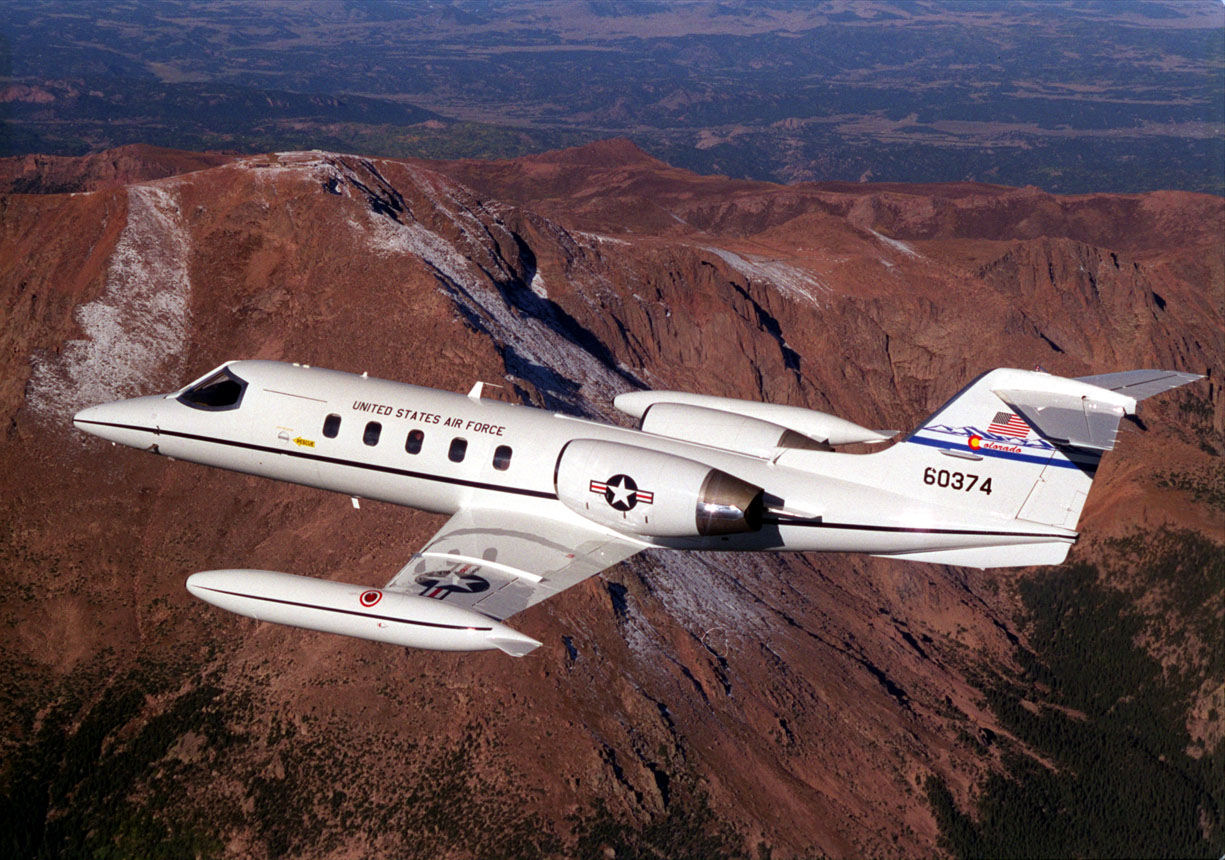
- 200th Airlift Squadron - C-21A Learjet
- Active: December 1978 – May 2018
- Country: United States
- Allegiance: Colorado
- Branch: Air National Guard
- Type: Squadron
- Role: Airlift
- Part of: Colorado Air National Guard

Insignia
- 200th Airlift Squadron emblem

The 200th Airlift Squadron is an inactive unit of the Colorado Air National Guard 140th Wing located at Peterson Air Force Base, Colorado Springs, Colorado. The 200th was last equipped with the C-21A Learjet. The squadron provided secure priority airlift from 1946 to 2018 for the highest level of military and civilian leaders throughout the world.

== History ==
=== Airlift in the Colorado National Guard ===
Airlift in the Colorado National Guard began with the assignment of a Douglas C-47 Skytrain to Buckley Field Base Operations section in 1946. The C-47 was the original "Flintstone Airlines". A Douglas C-54 Skymaster (Flintstone II) replaced the C-47 in 1966. Flintstone I and II provided airlift for state emergencies, unit deployments and general requirements of both the Colorado Army and Air National Guard. A Convair C-131 Samaritan eventually replaced the C-54 and Buckley Base Operations controlled both the C-131 and Cessna O-2 Skymaster aircraft. In 1979 two Boeing T-43 Bobcats arrived at Buckley and replaced the C-131 and O-2s.

The unit was renamed Operating Location AA (OL-AA) and the T-43s served as flying classrooms in support of the United States Air Force Academy (USAFA) 50th Airmanship Training Squadron Airmanship Program from 1979 through 1997. On 1 July 1983, while under the command of Lt. Col. Mel Walden, the unit separated from other base operations functions and became Operating Location BB (OL-BB).

In October 1985 the unit received two CT-43As configured for passenger airlift, augmenting and expanding into a dual Operational Support Aircraft (OSA) supporting VIP missions. In addition to the Airmanship Program, the unit flew worldwide airlift missions supporting many dignitaries including the prime minister of the United Kingdom, U.S. cabinet members, congressmen, ambassadors, and the Chief of Staff of the Air Force. It added two additional CT-43As in 1981. In January 1986, Lt. Col. Ron Germano took command and the unit became Detachment 1, Headquarters Colorado Air National Guard. It transferred CT-43s to other organizations in 1991.

=== Expansion to a squadron ===
In June 1992 the detachment was replaced by the 200th Airlift Squadron and in November 1997, it received the first of two Learjet C-21A aircraft. The T-43As transferred to Randolph Air Force Base in 1997. It replaced them with Fairchild C-26 Metroliner turboprops in 1996. Lt. Col. Scott Schofield took command on 6 March 1999 at Buckley Air National Guard Base, and the 200th moved to Peterson Air Force Base in April 1999 near USAFA in Colorado Springs.

After the 11 September 2001 attacks, the squadron transported emergency responders to New York and Washington D.C., and began a new mission as target aircraft for NORAD air defense exercises. The 200th also supported USNORTHCOM disaster relief missions after hurricanes Katrina and Rita in 2005.

On 23 March 2006, an inter-fly agreement with the active-duty 311th Airlift Squadron was signed and the 375th Operations Group began Total Force Operations. With the inter-fly agreement, the two squadrons share jets, pilots, and deployments.

In February 2010, the squadron participated in its first combat deployment, sending six crewmembers to the CENTCOM AOR in support of Operations Iraqi Freedom and Enduring Freedom. Since then, several more 200th crewmembers have deployed and the unit continues to support and augment the active duty in-theater mission.

The 200th held a formal inactivation ceremony 14 October 2018, presided over by Gov. John Hickenlooper at Buckley. Prior to its inactivation in June 2018, the 200th had won Joint Operational Support Airlift Center small unit award seven years in a row. The Air Force transferred one of squadron aircraft to Andrews Air Force Base, with the other transferring to Scott Air Force Base.

== Lineage ==
- Constituted as the 200th Airlift Squadron on 16 March 1992

Activated on 1 June 1992
Inactivated c. 1 June 2018

=== Assignments ===
- 140th Fighter Wing, 1 June 1992
- 140th Operations Group, 1 October 1995 – c. 1 June 2018

=== Stations ===
- Buckley Air National Guard Base, Colorado, 1 June 1992
- Peterson Air Force Base, Colorado, 1 October 1997 – c. 1 June 2018

=== Aircraft ===
- Boeing T-43A Bobcat, 1979-1997
- Fairchild C-26B Metroliner, 1996-1997
- C-21A Learjet, 1997–2018
