= 50th Attack Squadron =

50th Attack Squadron

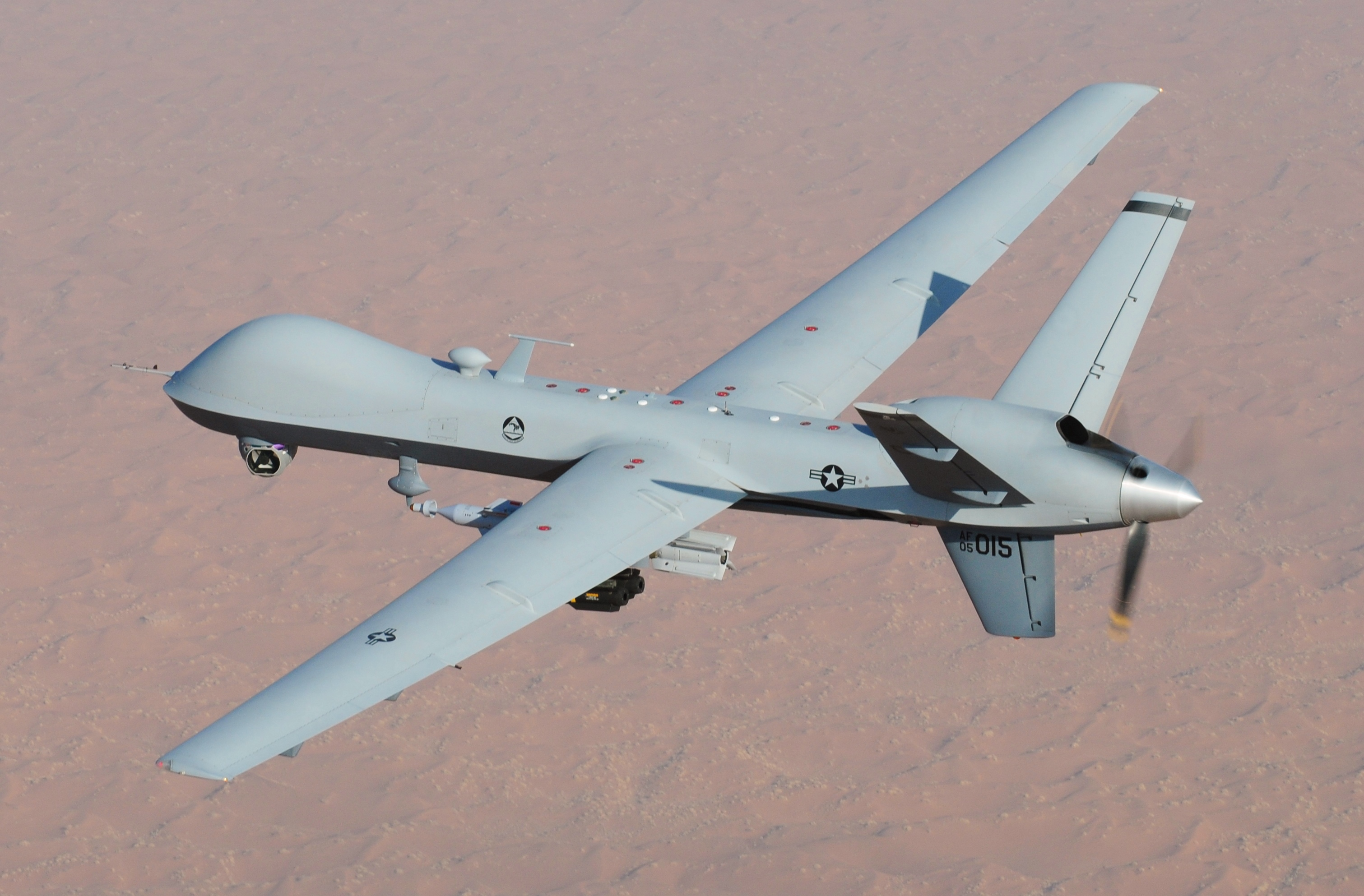
- MQ-9 Reaper as flown by the squadron
- Active: 1917–1927; 1930–1947; 1983–2005; 2018–present
- Country: United States
- Branch: United States Air Force
- Role: Unmanned aerial vehicle operation
- Size: Squadron
- Garrison/HQ: Shaw Air Force Base
- Engagements: World War I Asiatic-Pacific Theater
- Decorations: Distinguished Unit Citation; Presidential Unit Citation (Navy); Air Force Meritorious Unit Award; Air Force Outstanding Unit Award; Air Force Organizational Excellence Award

Insignia
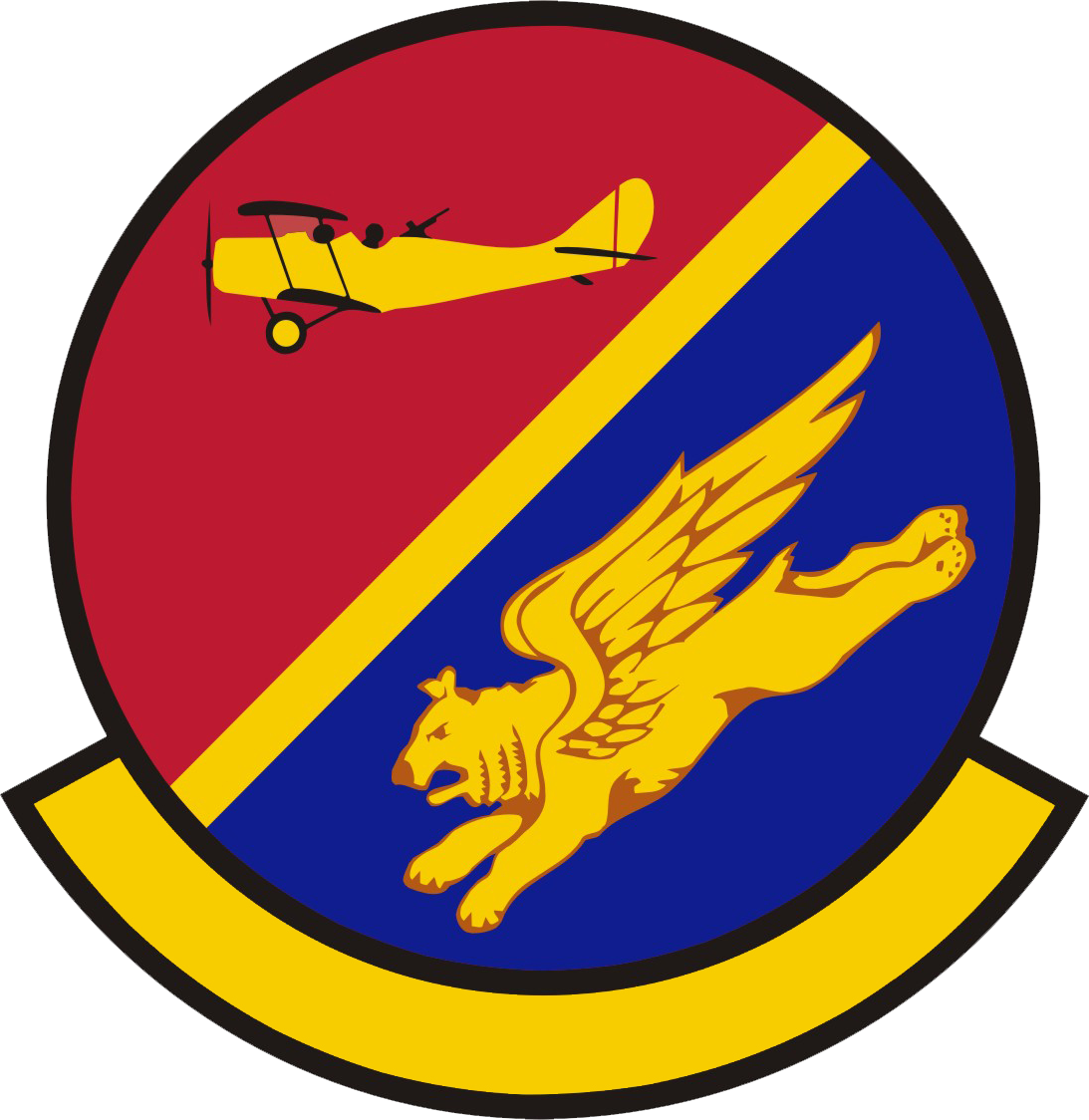
- 50th Attack Squadron emblem (Note: Approved 14 March 1996.)

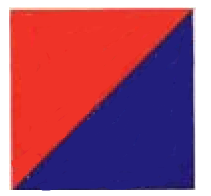
- 50th Observation Squadron emblem (Note: Approved 15 February 1924. Description: A square parted diagonally from upper right to lower left corners red above and blue below.)

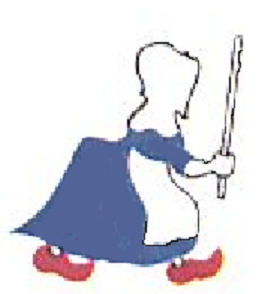
- 50th Aero Squadron emblem (Note: Approved by Hq, AEF 18 November 1918.)

The 50th Attack Squadron is a squadron of the United States Air Force, stationed at Shaw Air Force Base, South Carolina, where it operates the General Atomics MQ-9 Reaper unmanned aerial vehicle. It is assigned to the 25th Attack Group, also at Shaw, and is a component of the 432d Wing, located at Creech Air Force Base, Nevada.

Formed in August 1917 as the 50th Aero Squadron, the unit flew observation missions in American built de Havilland DH-4s over the battlefields of World War I. On 6 October 1918, 1Lt Harold E. Goettler and 2Lt Erwin R. Bleckley, of the squadron were posthumously awarded the Medal of Honor. In the spring of 1919, the squadron returned to the United States, and was stationed at Langley Field, Virginia until 1927, operating with the Air Corps Tactical School. It moved to Brooks Field, Texas, where it was inactivated in August 1927 and its personnel and equipment were transferred to another unit.

In 1930, the squadron was again activated in Hawaii. In 1938, it was redesignated the 50th Reconnaissance Squadron and was stationed at Hickam Field during the attack on Pearl Harbor. In 1942, the squadron became the 431st Bombardment Squadron, and served in the Pacific Theater, where the unit earned the Distinguished Unit Citation and the Navy Presidential Unit Citation. The squadron remained in the Philippines after V-J Day, returning to the reconnaissance mission in 1946 as the 5th Reconnaissance Squadron until it was inactivated on 20 October 1947 and its resources transferred to another squadron.

The squadron was reactivated at the United States Air Force Academy on 1 October 1983 and designated the 50th Airmanship Training Squadron. The focus of the 50th later changed to the classroom, supporting the instruction of US Air Force Academy cadets in military strategic studies as the 50th Education Squadron. It was inactivated in August 2005.

The squadron was redesignated the 50th Attack Squadron and activated at Shaw in February 2018.

== Mission ==
The squadron provides General Atomics MQ-9 Reaper crews the ability to train outside of combat missions. The MQ-9 Reaper is a medium-to-high altitude, long endurance remotely piloted aircraft system.

== History ==
=== World War I ===
==== Organization and training in the United States ====
The unit was first organized as the 50th Aero Squadron with 149 men at Kelly Field No. 1, Texas, on 6 August 1917. It moved to Kelly Field No. 2 on 12 September and was designated as a school squadron, its personnel entered training for engine mechanics and performed field garrison duties. It moved back to Field No. 1 on 17 November and was equipped with Curtiss JN-4 aircraft and pilots, and entered training for combat service in France.

On 20 December 1917, the 50th transferred from Kelly Field for overseas duty. It moved to the Aviation Concentration Center, Camp Mills, Garden City, New York arriving on 3 January 1918. It departed from the United States on transport No. 508 (RMS Carmania on 9 January, arriving at Liverpool, England on 24 January. Once in England, the 50th was moved to RFC Harlaxton, Lincolnshire and began advanced training in aircraft rigging and engine repair, along with gunnery, radio, photography and aerial bombing prior to being sent to France.

==== Combat in France ====
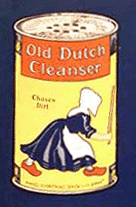
The Dutch Girl logo of Old Dutch Cleanser.

Departure orders for France were received on 3 July 1918, the squadron departing from the port of Southampton, arriving in Le Havre, France on 14 July. It entered service with the Air Service, American Expeditionary Forces (AEF) at the Air Service Replacement Concentration Barracks, St. Maixent on 17 July. After receiving additional personnel, supplies and equipment, it moved to the combat flying school at the 1st Observation Group School on Amanty Airdrome on 27 July. At Amanty, the squadron received American-built De Havilland DH-4s and after training on the DH-4s, the squadron was designated as a corps observation squadron and assigned to the I Corps Observation Group. After a short spell at the Behonne Air Depot, the squadron moved to Bicqueley Airdrome on 8 September for combat duty on the front. The squadron adopted the Dutch Girl trademark of Old Dutch Cleanser as its insignia. To the fliers of the 50th Aero Squadron, the Dutch Girl meant one thing: "Clean up on Germany." The insigne was painted on the aircraft, and squadron members wore matching pins above the right breast pocket on their uniforms.

In combat, the mission of the 50th Aero Squadron was general surveillance of the enemy rear areas by means of both visual and photographic reconnaissance. These missions were carried out for the purpose of intelligence-gathering and informing First Army headquarters informed of enemy movements and preparations for attacks or retreats of its infantry forces. The 50th identified enemy activity along roads and railroads, ground stations, various storage dumps and airfields; the numbers of fires and activities of enemy aircraft, and the amount of anti-aircraft artillery was also monitored and reported. Due to the nature of the missions and the depths of enemy area which was penetrated, the missions were carried out at high altitudes, usually between 4,500 and 5,500 meters.

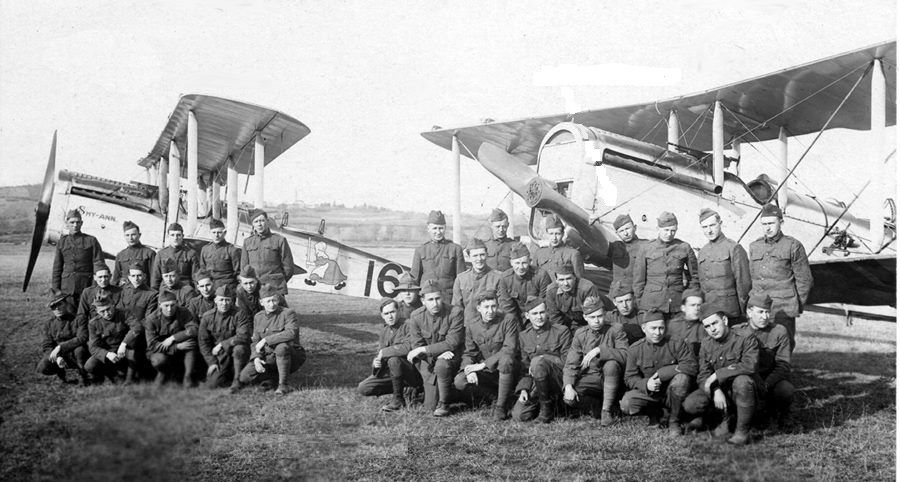
Members and aircraft of the 50th Aero Squadron at Clermont-en-Argonne Airdrome, France, 1918

The 50th flew its first combat mission on 12 September, supporting the 82nd and 90th Infantry Divisions as part of the St. Mihiel Offensive Campaign. It flew flights to help adjust the artillery barrage on enemy forces for the 90th Division, and also reconnaissance missions, observing and photographing enemy forces in the rear areas and reporting that information to the 82d Division commander. The weather during the offensive, however, was extremely poor. Fortunately, the enemy air activity was very slight at the beginning of the offensive, but a day or two afterwards, there was a marked increase in enemy activity. One observer was killed in action, and one plane, with its observer and pilot failed to return during the Offensive.

After St. Mihiel, the squadron moved to the Remicourt Aerodrome in preparation for the next American offensive, in the Forest of Argonne. There it joined the 1st and 12th Aero Squadrons. Its movement to Remicourt was delayed until 24 September due to weather. On the 26th, squadron combat operations began supporting the 77th Division, the 50th Aero Squadron flew its first missions of the Meuse-Argonne Offensive with a complement of 15 pilots, 15 observers, and 16 aircraft. Initially the aircraft flew observation or dropped messages

At the beginning of October, units of the 308th Infantry Regiment were cut off and surrounded by German troops. Able to communicate with division headquarters only by carrier pigeon, the battalion-sized force inadvertently supplied division headquarters with incorrect coordinates of its location. On 2 October the 50th Aero Squadron searched for signs of the cut-off battalion, and on 5 October the 77th Division commander, Maj. Gen. Robert Alexander, requested that the 50th Aero Squadron locate and resupply the "Lost Battalion" by air with ammunition, rations, and medical supplies. The following day, pilot Harold E. Goettler and observer Erwin R. Bleckley made a second trip to drop supplies to the battalion which had been cut off by the enemy in the Argonne Forest. They had been subjected on their first trip to violent fire from the enemy, but attempted on the second trip to come still lower in order to get airdropped packages more precisely on the designated spot. In the course of this flight the plane was brought down by enemy rifle and machinegun fire from, resulting in the instant death of Lt Goettler and resulting in fatal wounds to L. Bleckley, who died before he could be taken to a hospital. For this action, they were each awarded the Medal of Honor

On 28 October, the squadron moved from Remicourt to the new Parois Airdrome near Clermont-en-Argonne, where it continued combat operations until the 11 November Armistice with Germany. In its short period of combat, it flew 192 missions, consisting of 373 sorties. It lost 25 aircraft and claimed one enemy aircraft destroyed.

==== Post World War I duty in France ====
After the end of hostilities, the air service in France was slow to bring their units back to the United States. Transportation was poor, and many had to wait months to board a ship. The 50th was no exception, as it was split into flights and assigned to various locations in France, performing postwar service duties.

With the inactivation of the First Army Air Service, the 50th Aero Squadron was ordered to report to the 1st Air Depot at Colombey-les-Belles Airdrome on 1 April 1919, to turn in all of its supplies and equipment and was relieved from duty with the AEF. The squadron's DH-4 aircraft were delivered to the Air Service Production Center No. 2. at Romorantin Aerodrome. There practically all of the pilots and observers were detached from the squadron. Personnel at Colombey were subsequently assigned to the Commanding General, Services of Supply and ordered to report to the staging camp at Clamecy, France on 9 April. There, personnel awaited scheduling to report to one of the Base Ports in France for transport to the United States. It moved to the port of Marseille, France, 22 April when it boarded the SS Caserta.

Upon its arrival in New York, the squadron proceeded to Scott Field, Illinois, arriving on 27 May.

===== Notable personnel =====
- Lt. Erwin Russell Bleckley, Medal of Honor (Killed in Action)
- Lt. Harold Ernest Goettler, Medal of Honor (Killed in Action)
- Lt. Franklin B. Bellows, (Note: Bellows Air Force Station, Hawaii was named in honor of Lt Bellows.No Byline (2024). "Hawaii Aviation, An Archive of Historic Photos and Facts: Bellows Field". State of Hawaii.) Distinguished Service Cross (Killed in Action)
- Lt. Mitchell H. Brown, Distinguished Service Cross, 1 aerial victory
- Lt. George R. Phillips, Distinguished Service Cross, 1 aerial victory

=== Inter-War era ===
==== Regular unit at Langley Field ====
A small cadre of the squadron remained at Scott Field until August 1919 when it was moved to Langley Field, Virginia. At Langley, it again received De Havilland DH-4s and was assigned to the 2d Wing. It was assigned to coastal and submarine patrol duties along the Atlantic coast. On 1 October it was attached to the 1st Army Observation Group.

In 1920, the squadron was called upon to help keep order during coal miner strikes in West Virginia. In May 1921, it was attached to the 1st Provisional Air Brigade, which was formed to demonstrate that aircraft could successfully attack armored navy ships. The test was held at the mouth of the Chesapeake Bay. Following training at Langley, the brigade bombed the German cruiser SMS Frankfurt and battleships SMS Ostfriesland and USS Alabama (BB-8).

The squadron moved to Brooks Field, Texas, where it was assigned to the Air Corps Training Center, in June 1927. It was inactivated on 1 August 1927 and its personnel and equipment transferred to the 51st School Squadron.

==== Regular Army Inactive service ====
The squadron was organized in December 1927 with Organized Reserve personnel as a Regular Army Inactive (RAI) unit at Dodd Field, Texas. (Note: Regular Army Inactive units were units that were constituted in the regular army. Although they were not activated, they were organized with reserve personnel during the 1920s and early 1930s. Even though they had reserve personnel assigned, they were not Organized Reserve units. Because they had no regular personnel they were still considered inactive in the regular army. Clay, p. vi.) Organized Reserve officers assigned to the unit participated in summer training at Kelly Field in 1928 and its designated mobilization training station was Dodd Field. The squadron was withdrawn from the Eighth Corps Area on 27 October 1928 and allotted to the Second Corps Area. It was organized on 27 May 1929 as an RAI unit at Mitchel Field, New York and withdrawn at the end of October 1930.

==== Return to active service ====
The squadron was reactivated as an aerial observation and defensive patrol squadron off the coast of Oahu, Hawaii Territory, 1 November 1930, stationed at Luke Field, and assigned to the 5th Composite Group, with Thomas-Morse O-19 as initial equipment. It remained in Hawaii as part of the Hawaiian Department throughout the 1930s as part of the air defenses of the islands. In 1932 and 1933, it participated in joint maneuvers with Army and Navy forces in the Hawaiian Islands.

In 1936, the squadron equipped with Martin B-12 medium bombers, although it retained some lighter aircraft as well. These were replaced in 1938 by Douglas B-18 Bolos. Recognizing the longer range of these planes, the squadron was redesignated the 50th Reconnaissance Squadron in January 1938. Later that year, its assignment to the 5th Group became an attachment. (Note: Neither Maurer not Haulman provide the unit of assignment while the squadron was attached to the 5th and 11th Bombardment Groups. However, both groups were assigned to the 18th Bombardment Wing which was formed "to provide the separate squadrons [in Hawaii] with an air headquarters." Williams, p. 171.) Between 1938 and 1941, it participated in annual exercises by the Hawaiian Department. Its attachment changed to the 11th Bombardment Group when it was activated in February 1940 as part of the Air Corps plan to expand to 24 combat groups. Beginning in May 1941, the squadron began training with the Boeing B-17D Flying Fortress, with the capability to fly longer reconnaissance missions from its base at Hickam Field.

=== World War II ===
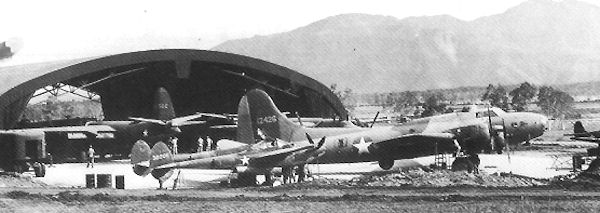
Squadron B-17E Flying Fortress at the Thirteenth Air Depot, Tontouna Airfield, New Caledonia (Note: Aircraft is B-17E Flying Fortress, serial 41–2426. Photo taken in August 1943, when the plane was undergoing depot level maintenance along with a Lockheed P-38, Bell P-39 and Martin B-26. This B-17 returned to the United States in February 1944 and was used as an instructional airframe. It was salvaged on 31 December 1945. Baugher, Joe (8 April 2023). "1941 USAF Serial Numbers". Joe Baugher.)

The squadron was at Hickam during the Japanese attack on Pearl Harbor on 7 December 1941. In April 1942, the 50th was redesignated the 431st Bombardment Squadron. The squadron flew patrol and search mission from the Hawaiian Islands, including air support during the Battle of Midway. In June 1942, shortly after the Battle of Midway, the 11th Group was authorized as a mobile force by the Army Air Forces in order to respond to a Navy request by Admiral Nimitz for long-range armed search planes to locate Japanese fleets, accompanied with firepower to withstand defending Japanese interceptors while tracking the fleet. The 11th Group left Hawaii to support Navy operations in the South Pacific Theater during the Guadalcanal and Northern Solomon Islands Campaigns.

The squadron moved to the New Hebrides on 22 July 1942 and became part of Thirteenth Air Force. It bombed airfields, supply dumps, ships, docks, troop positions, and other objectives in the South Pacific from July to November 1942, and received a Distinguished Unit Citation for those operations. It continued operations in the South Pacific, attacking Japanese airfields, installations, and shipping until late March 1943.

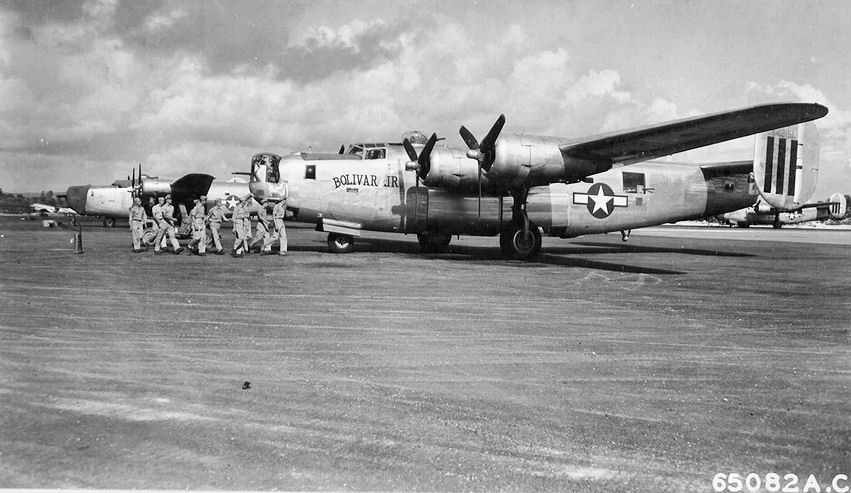
Squadron B-24M at Agana Airfield (Note: Aircraft is Convair B-24M-20-CO Liberator, serial 44-42151 Bolivar Jr. Picture taken at Agana Airfield, Guam, Marianas Islands on 6 June 1945.)

The squadron returned to Hickam Field and the control of Seventh Air Force on 8 April 1943. In Hawaii, the squadron equipped with Consolidated B-24 Liberator bombers, which it flew until the end of the war. Its training Included missions against Wake Island and other central Pacific bases held by the Japanese. It deployed to Ellice Island on 9 November 1943 and resumed combat participating in the Allied offensive through the Gilbert, Marshall and Marianas Islands, while operating from Funafuti, Tarawa, and Kwajalein.

"The squadron moved to Guam on 25 October 1944 and attacked shipping and airfields in the Volcano and Bonin Islands. It moved to Okinawa on 2 July 1945 to participate in the final phases of the air offensive against Japan, bombing railways, airfields, and harbor facilities on Kyushu and striking Japanese airfields in Eastern China."

=== Postwar reconnaissance in the Pacific ===
After V-J Day, the squadron flew surveillance and reconnaissance missions over China and ferried former prisoners of war to the Philippines. In December 1945 the squadron moved without personnel or equipment to Fort William McKinley, Philippines. On 29 April 1946 the squadron was redesignated as the 5th Reconnaissance Squadron and assigned to US Army Forces, Pacific, when its parent 11th Group moved to Guam. On 15 June 1946, the squadron moved to Clark Field, Philippines, where it was transferred to the 313th Bombardment Wing and began to reman and reequip.

At Clark, the 5th was equipped with Boeing F-13 Superfortress (B-29)s, F-7A Liberators (B-24J and L)s and a few F-9B Flying Fortresses (B-17F)s equipped for long range photography and mapping which had operated from Australia during the war. The squadron's mission was to perform aerial photography and mapping over the Southwest Pacific, Southeast Asia, Korea, Japan, Philippines, Formosa, and the Pescadores, 1946–1947, some missions being clandestine over northern China, Northern Korea and the Soviet Union. In February 1947, the squadron was reassigned to the 5th Reconnaissance Group, but was inactivated on 20 October 1947, transferring its mission, equipment and personnel to the 23d Reconnaissance Squadron, which was simultaneously activated at Clark.

=== United States Air Force Academy service ===
The squadron was designated the 50th Airmanship Training Squadron and activated at the United States Air Force Academy, Colorado as part of the 34th Education Group on 1 October 1983. In November 1994 it was redesignated the 50th Training Squadron. The squadron operated Boeing T-43 Bobcats, which flew out of Buckley Air National Guard Base, Colorado and were maintained by the 200th Airlift Squadron of the Colorado Air National Guard.

The summer of 1997 saw the last flight of the squadron's T-43As for the squadron with a change in mission for the squadron to classroom education of cadets in military strategic studies and a loss of funding for the 200th Airlift Squadron. In January 2001 the squadron was redesignated the 50th Education Squadron, reflecting the squadron's change in mission. The squadron was inactivated on 1 August 2005.

=== Remotely piloted vehicle operations ===
The squadron was redesignated the 50th Attack Squadron and activated at Shaw Air Force Base, South Carolina on 18 February 2018. It was originally assigned to a unit located at Creech Air Force Base, Nevada. As unmanned aerial vehicle operations at Shaw expanded, the 25th Attack Group was activated in October 2018 and the 50th was assigned to it. The squadron operates the General Atomics MQ-9 Reaper.

== Lineage ==
- Organized as the 50th Aero Squadron on 6 August 1917

Redesignated 50th Aero Squadron (Corps Observation) on 8 September 1918
Redesignated 50th Aero Squadron on 1 June 1919
Redesignated 50th Squadron, Observation on 14 March 1921
Redesignated 50th Observation Squadron on 25 January 1923
Inactivated on 1 August 1927

- Organized with reserve personnel on 1 December 1927

Reserve personnel withdrawn on 27 October 1928

- Organized with reserve personnel on 27 May 1929

Reserve personnel withdrawn on 31 October 1930

- Activated on 1 November 1930

Redesignated 50th Reconnaissance Squadron on 25 January 1938
Redesignated 50th Reconnaissance Squadron (Medium Range) on 6 December 1939
Redesignated 50th Reconnaissance Squadron (Heavy) on 20 November 1940
Redesignated 431st Bombardment Squadron (Heavy) on 22 April 1942
Redesignated 431st Bombardment Squadron, Heavy c. 3 August 1944
Redesignated 5th Reconnaissance Squadron, Very Long Range, Photographic on 29 April 1946
Inactivated on 20 October 1947

- Redesignated 50th Airmanship Training Squadron on 30 September 1983

Activated on 1 October 1983
Redesignated 50th Training Squadron on 1 November 1994
Redesignated 50th Education Squadron on 1 January 2001
Inactivated on 1 August 2005
Redesignated as 50th Attack Squadron on 13 Feb 2018.
Activated on 27 Feb 2018

=== Assignments ===
- Post Headquarters, Kelly Field, 6 August 1917
- Aviation Concentration Center, 3 January 1918
- Air Service Headquarters, AEF, British Isles, 24 January 1918 (attached to Royal Flying Corps for training until 3 July 1918)
- Replacement Concentration Center, AEF, 17–27 July 1918
- I Corps Observation Group, 8 September 1918
- 1st Air Depot, 1 April 1919
- Commanding General, Services of Supply, April–May 1919
- Post Headquarters, Mitchel Field, 1 May 1919
- Post Headquarters, Scott Field, 27 May 1919
- Post Headquarters, Langley Field, 1 August 1919
- 2d Wing, September 1919 (attached to First Army Observation Group after c. 1 October 1919)
- First Army Observation Group, 24 May 1920
- Air Service Field Officers' School, 10 February 1921 (attached to 1st Provisional Air Brigade for operations, 6 May – 3 October 1921)
- 2nd Wing, 8 August 1922 (attached to Air Service Field Officers' (later Air Service Tactical School, Air Corps Tactical School))
- Air Corps Training Center, c. 25 June – 1 August 1927
- Regular Army Inactive

Office of the Chief of the Air Corps 1 December 1927
9th Observation Group 13 February 1929
5th Composite Group 8 May 1929

- 5th Composite Group, 1 November 1930
- 18th Wing (Note: This wing is not related to the current 18th Wing, which was established in 1948.) (later 18th Bombardment Wing, 12 October 1938 (attached to 5th Bombardment Group to 1 February 1940, then to 11th Bombardment Group)
- 11th Bombardment Group, 25 February 1942
- US Army Forces, Pacific, 29 April 1946
- 313th Bombardment Wing, 15 June 1946
- 5th Reconnaissance Group, 3 February – 20 October 1947
- 34th Education Group, 1 October 1983 – 1 August 2005
- 432d Operations Group, 27 February 2018 – 2 October 2018
- 25th Attack Group, 2 October 2018 – present

=== Stations ===
- Kelly Field, Texas, 6 August – 28 December 1917
- Romney Rest Camp, Winchester, England, 24 January 1918
- RFC Harlaxton (Grantham), Lincolnshire, England, 4 February 1918
- Winchester, Hampshire, England 3–13 July 1918
- Amanty Airdrome, France, 27 July 1918
- Behonne Air Depot, France, 4 September 1918
- Bicqueley Airdrome, France, 8 September 1918
- Remicourt Aerodrome, France, 24 September 1918
- Parois Airdrome (Clermont-en-Argonne), France, 28 October 1918
- Longeau (Note: Maurer says (p. 531) "Langres, France (operated from Longeau)". Two construction squadrons (482nd and 484th) worked earlier at Longeaux (with an "x"), south of Ligny en Barrois. These may be the same location.) aerodrome, near Langres, France, 6 December 1918

B Flight operated from Parois Airdrome until 18 December 1918, then moved to Clamecy
C Flight operated from Parois Airdrome till 12 December 1918, then moved to Camp de La Valbonne, a military training grounds near Lyon.

- Clamecy, France, 19 January – 19 April 1919
- Mitchel Field, New York, 9 May 1919
- Scott Field, Illinois, 27 May 1919
- Langley Field, Virginia, August 1919
- Brooks Field, Texas, 25 June – 1 August 1927
- Dodd Field, Texas, 1 December 1927
- Mitchel Field, New York, 27 May 1929
- Luke Field, Hawaii, 1 November 1930
- Hickam Field, Hawaii, 9 October 1939
- Nadi Airfield, Viti Levu, Fiji, 24 July 1942 (air echelon operated from Luganville Airfield, Espiritu Santo, New Hebrides, August 1942)
- Luganville Airfield, Espiritu Santo, New Hebrides, 1 November 1942 – 28 March 1943 (forward echelon operated from Henderson Field (Guadalcanal), Solomon Islands, December 1942)
- Hickam Field, Hawaii Territory, 8 April 1943
- Funafuti Airfield, Nanumea, Gilbert Islands, 11 November 1943
- Hawkins Field, Tarawa, Gilbert Islands, 16 January 1944
- Kwajalein Airfield, Marshall Islands, 31 March 1944
- Agana Airfield, Guam, Marianas Islands, 21 October 1944
- Kadena Airfield, Okinawa, 2 July 1945
- Fort William McKinley, Luzon, Philippines, December 1945
- Clark Field, Luzon, Philippines, 15 June 1946 – 20 October 1947
- United States Air Force Academy, Colorado, 1 October 1983 – 1 August 2005
- Shaw Air Force Base, South Carolina, 27 February 2018 – present

=== Aircraft ===
- De Havilland DH-4, 1918–1919; 1919–1927
- Royal Aircraft Factory SE-5, 1919–1927
- Thomas-Morse O-19, 1930–1936
- Martin B-12, 1936–1938
- Curtiss A-3 Falcon, c. 1936–1938
- Boeing P-12, c. 1936–1938
- Douglas B-18 Bolo, 1938–1941
- Boeing B-17 Flying Fortress, 1941–1943
- Consolidated B-24J Liberator, 1943–1945
- Boeing F-13 Superfortress, 1946–1947
- Consolidated F-7A Liberator, 1946–1947
- Boeing F-9B Flying Fortress, 1946–1947
- Boeing T-43 Bobcat, 1983–1997
- General Atomics MQ-9 Reaper, 2018–present

=== Awards and campaigns ===
Award streamer	Award	Dates	Notes
	Distinguished Unit Citation	2 August–October 1942	431st Bombardment Squadron
	Presidential Unit Citation (Navy)	1942	431st Bombardment Squadron
	Air Force Meritorious Unit Award	1 June 2017-31 May 2018	50th Attack Squadron
	Air Force Meritorious Unit Award	1 June 2018-31 May 2020	50th Attack Squadron
	Air Force Outstanding Unit Award	1 October 1985-30 September 1986	50th Airmanship Training Squadron
	Air Force Outstanding Unit Award	1 October 1985-30 September 1986	50th Airmanship Training Squadron
	Air Force Outstanding Unit Award	1 January 1988-31 December 1989	50th Airmanship Training Squadron
	Air Force Outstanding Unit Award	1 January 1990-31 December 1991	50th Airmanship Training Squadron
	Air Force Outstanding Unit Award	1 September 1994-31 October 1995	50th Airmanship Training Squadron (later 50th Training Squadron)
	Air Force Outstanding Unit Award	1 June 1996-31 May 1998	50th Training Squadron
	Air Force Outstanding Unit Award	1 June 1998-31 May 2000	50th Training Squadron
	Air Force Outstanding Unit Award	1 June 2019-31 May 2021	50th Attack Squadron
	Air Force Organizational Excellence Award	1 September 1992-31 August 1994	50th AirmanshipTraining Squadron

Campaign Streamer	Campaign	Dates	Notes
	St Mihiel	12 September 1918 – 16 September 1918	50th Aero Squadron
	Lorraine		50th Aero Squadron
	Meuse-Argonne	26 September 1918 – 11 November 1918	50th Aero Squadron
	Air Combat, Asiatic–Pacific Theater	7 December 1941 – 2 March 1946	50th Reconnaissance Squadron (431st Bombardment Squadron)
	Central Pacific	7 December 1941 – 6 December 1943	50th Reconnaissance Squadron (later 431st Bombardment Squadron)
	Air Offensive, Japan	17 April 1942 – 2 September 1945	431st Bombardment Squadron
	Papua	23 July 1942 – 23 January 1943	431st Bombardment Squadron
	Guadalcanal	7 August 1942 – 21 February 1943	431st Bombardment Squadron
	Eastern Mandates	7 December 1943 – 14 April 1944	431st Bombardment Squadron
	Ryukus	26 March 1945 – 2 July 1945	431st Bombardment Squadron
	Western Pacific	17 April 1945 – 2 September 1945	431st Bombardment Squadron
	China Offensive	5 May 1945 – 2 September 1945	431st Bombardment Squadron

== See also ==
- List of United States Air Force squadrons
- B-17 Flying Fortress units of the United States Army Air Forces
- B-24 Liberator units of the United States Army Air Forces
- List of American Aero Squadrons
- Erwin R. Bleckley
- Harold Ernest Goettler
- Lost Battalion (World War I)
- List of American aero squadrons
- Organization of the Air Service of the American Expeditionary Force
