= Harold Ernest Goettler =

US Army Air Service Medal of Honor recipient (1890–1918)

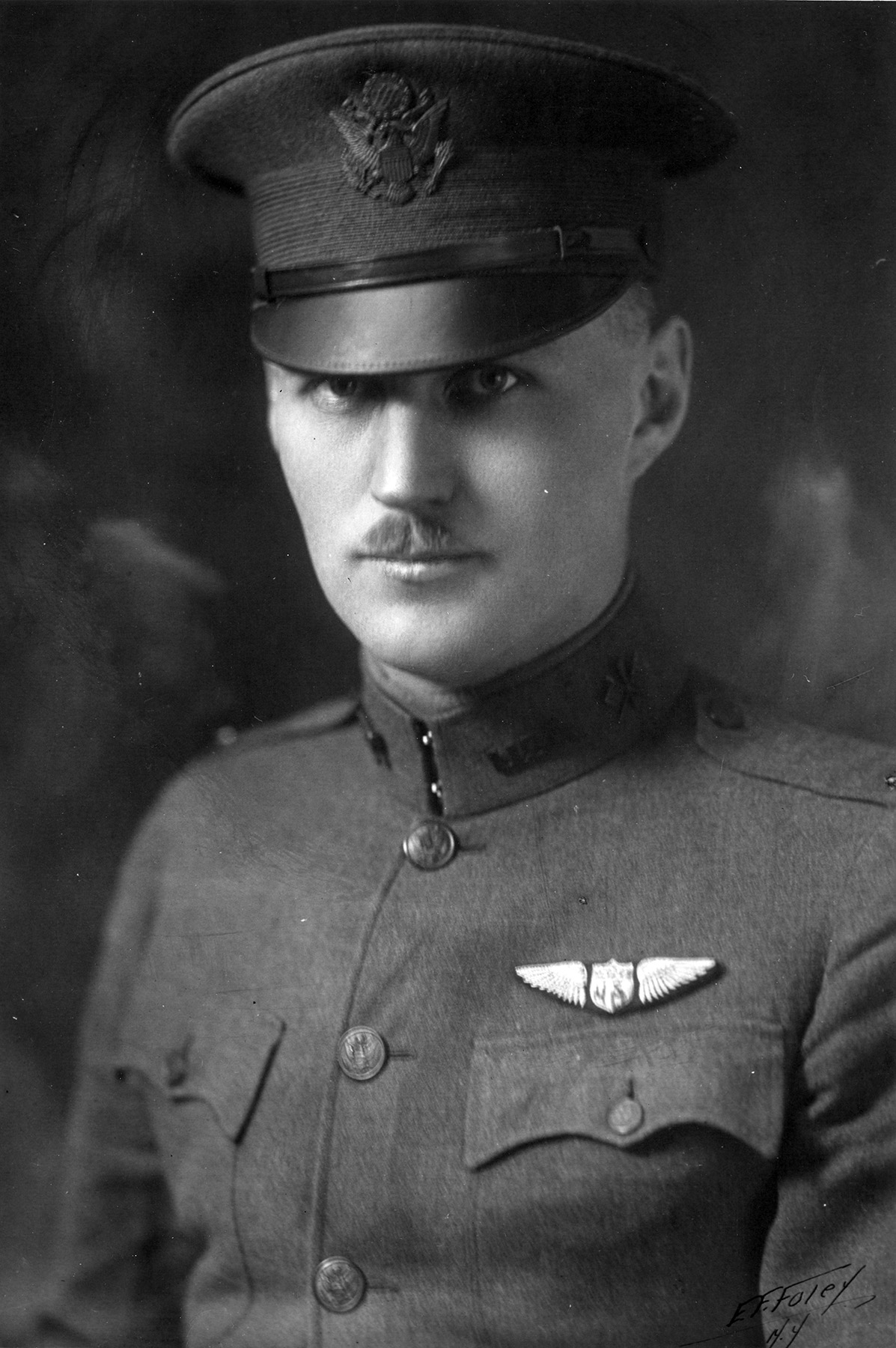
- Medal of Honor recipient Harold E. Goettler
- Born: July 21, 1890; Chicago, Illinois, US
- Died: October 6, 1918 (aged 28); KIA near Binarville, France
- Burial place: Graceland Cemetery, Chicago, Cook County, Illinois
- Military career
- Allegiance: United States of America
- Branch: United States Army Air Service
- Service years: 1917–1918
- Rank: First Lieutenant
- Unit: 50th Aero Squadron
- Conflicts: World War I: The Lost battalion †
- Awards: Medal of Honor

Harold Ernest Goettler (July 21, 1890 – October 6, 1918) was a U.S. Army Air Service aviator killed in action on October 6, 1918, while locating the Lost Battalion of the 77th Division during World War I. He died of wounds resulting from German fire from the ground during the flight. For his actions, he posthumously received the Medal of Honor. He attended the University of Chicago, and the Harold E. Goettler Political Institutions Prize awarded to University of Chicago undergraduates is named in his honor.

== Medal of Honor citation ==
Rank and organization: First Lieutenant, pilot, U.S. Air Service, 50th Aero Squadron, Air Service. Place and date: Near Binarville, France, October 6, 1918. Entered service at: Chicago, Ill. Born: July 21, 1890, Chicago, Ill. G.O. No.: 56, W.D., 1922.

Citation:

1st. Lt. Goettler, with his observer, 2d Lt. Erwin R. Bleckley, 130th Field Artillery, left the airdrome late in the afternoon on their second trip to drop supplies to a battalion of the 77th Division which had been cut off by the enemy in the Argonne Forest. Having been subjected on the first trip to violent fire from the enemy, they attempted on the second trip to come still lower in order to get the packages even more precisely on the designated spot. In the course of this mission the plane was brought down by enemy rifle and machinegun fire from the ground, resulting in the instant death of 1st. Lt. Goettler. In attempting and performing this mission 1st. Lt. Goettler showed the highest possible contempt of personal danger, devotion to duty, courage and valor.

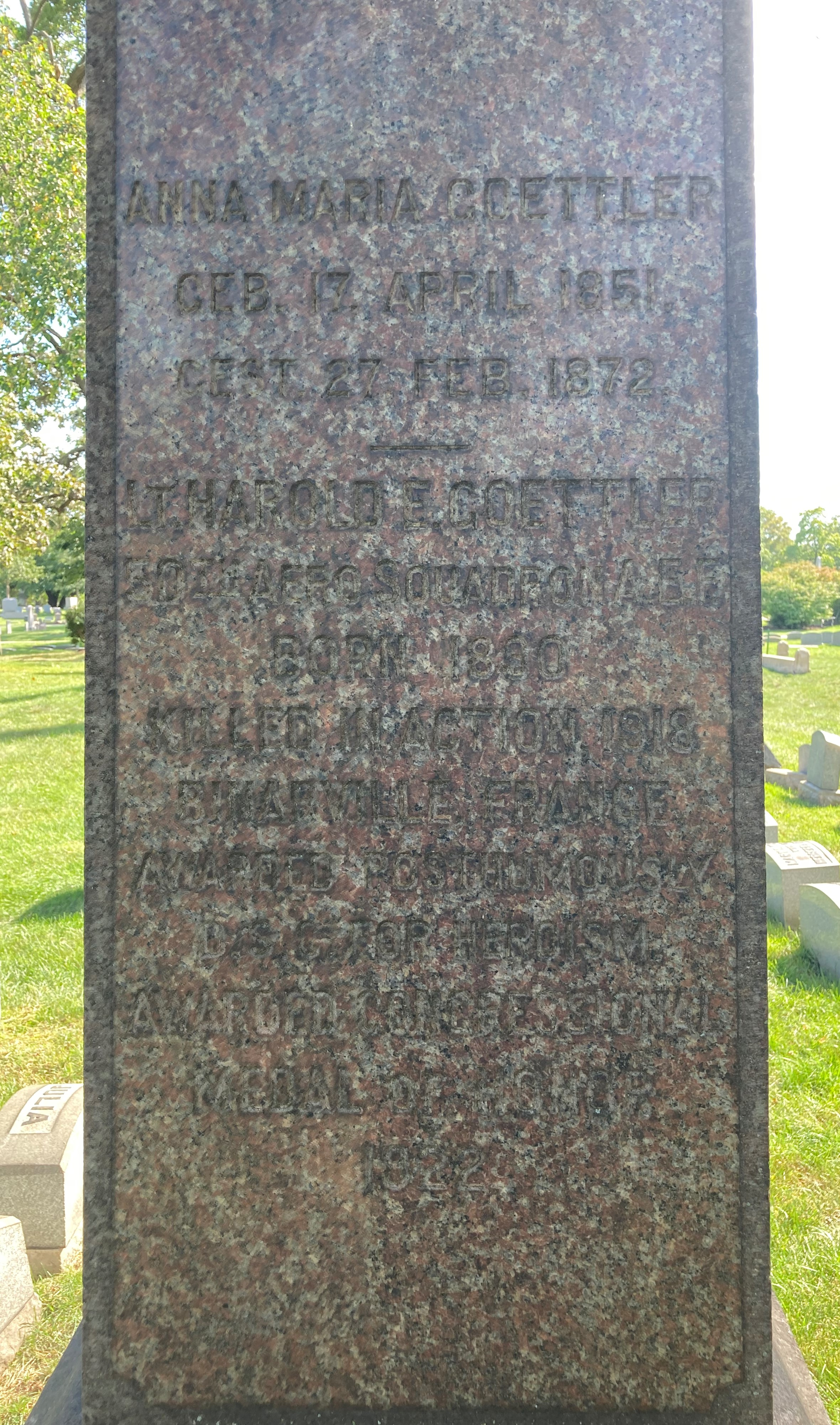
Goettler's grave

== See also ==
- List of Medal of Honor recipients
- List of Medal of Honor recipients for World War I
