= Châtillon-sous-les-Côtes =

- Commune
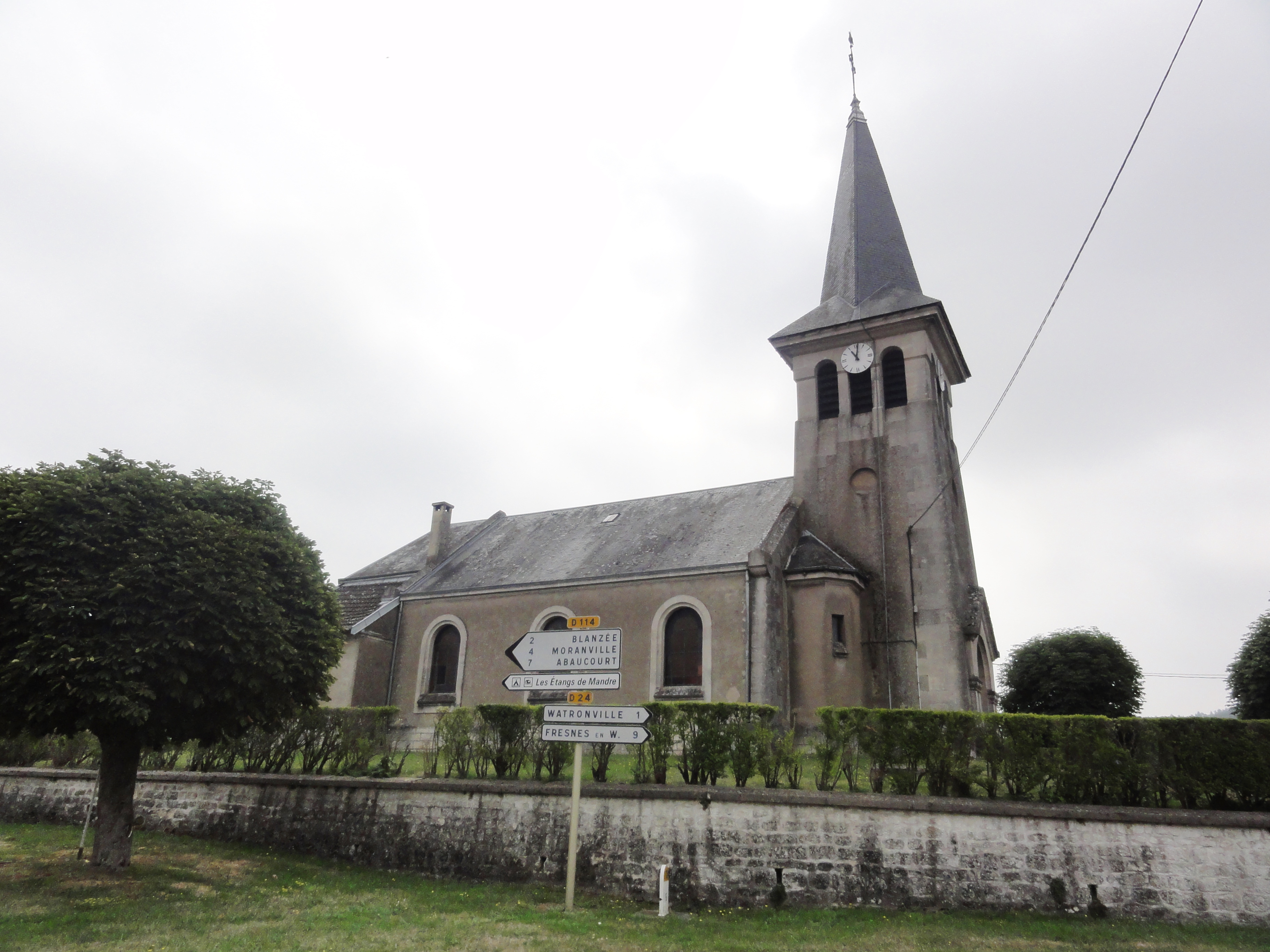
- The church in Châtillon-sous-les-Côtes
- Location of Châtillon-sous-les-Côtes
- Location within France Location within Grand Est
- Coordinates: 49°08′45″N 5°31′29″E
- Country: France
- Region: Grand Est
- Department: Meuse
- Arrondissement: Verdun
- Canton: Belleville-sur-Meuse
- Intercommunality: CC du pays d'Étain

Government
  - Mayor (2020–2026): Chantal Bertrand
- Area^{1}: 10.68 km^{2} (4.12 sq mi)
- Elevation: 245 m (804 ft)
- Highest elevation: 381 m (1,250 ft)
- Lowest elevation: 224 m (735 ft)
- Population (2023): 176
  - Density: 16.5/km^{2} (42.7/sq mi)
- Time zone: UTC+01:00 (CET)
  - Summer (DST): UTC+02:00 (CEST)
- INSEE/Postal code: 55105 /55400
- ^{1} French Land Register data, which excludes lakes, ponds, glaciers > 1 km^{2} (0.386 sq mi or 247 acres) and river estuaries.

Châtillon-sous-les-Côtes (French pronunciation: [ʃatijɔ̃ su le kot]) is a commune in the Meuse department in Grand Est in north-eastern France.

== See also ==
- Communes of the Meuse department
