= Bicqueley =

- Commune
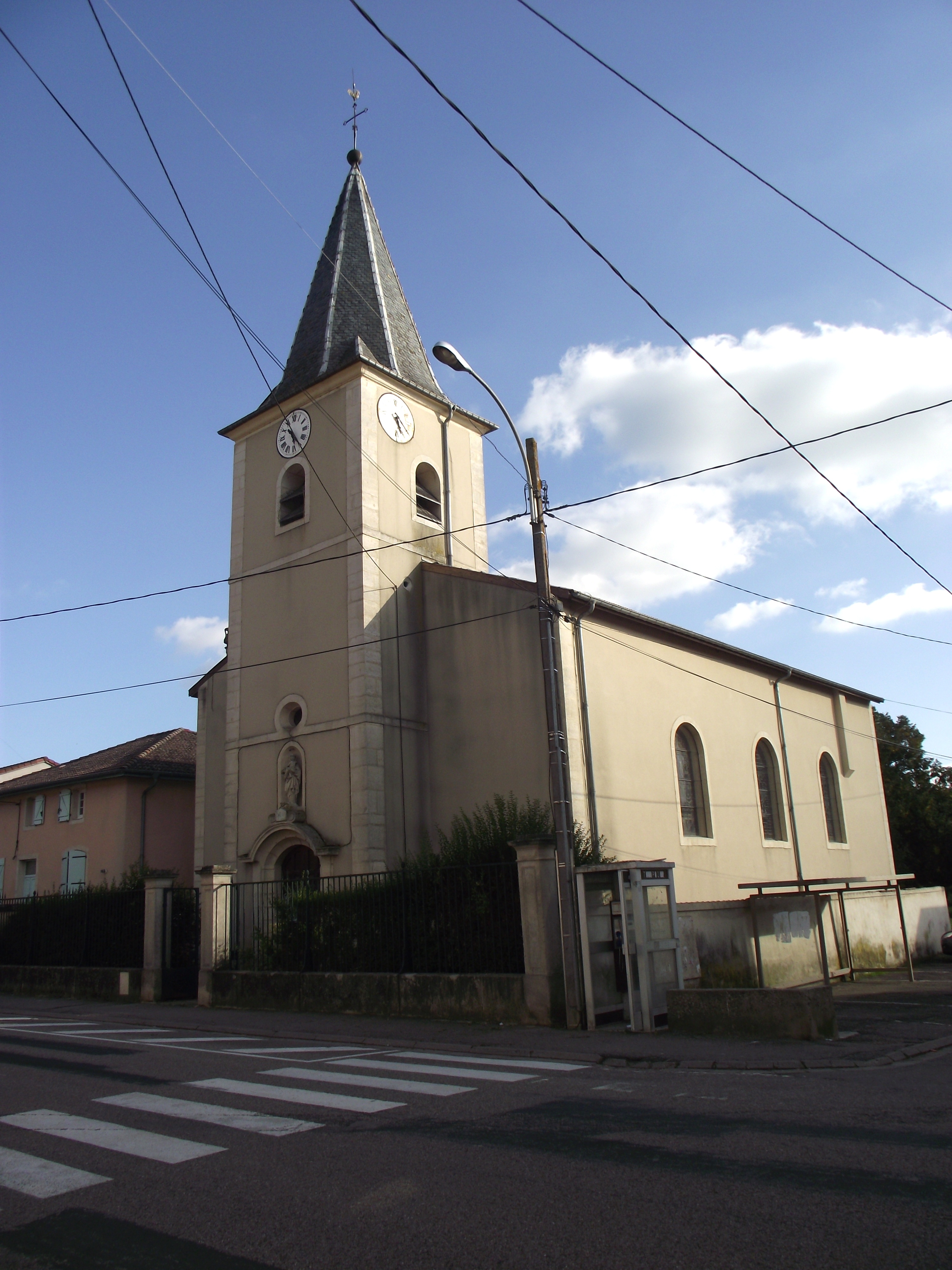
- The church in Bicqueley

- Coat of arms
- Location of Bicqueley
- Location within France Location within Grand Est
- Coordinates: 48°37′38″N 5°54′46″E
- Country: France
- Region: Grand Est
- Department: Meurthe-et-Moselle
- Arrondissement: Toul
- Canton: Toul

Government
  - Mayor (2020–2026): André Fontana
- Area^{1}: 16.82 km^{2} (6.49 sq mi)
- Elevation: 217 m (712 ft)
- Highest elevation: 338 m (1,109 ft)
- Lowest elevation: 207 m (679 ft)
- Population (2023): 925
  - Density: 55.0/km^{2} (142/sq mi)
- Time zone: UTC+01:00 (CET)
  - Summer (DST): UTC+02:00 (CEST)
- INSEE/Postal code: 54073 /54200
- ^{1} French Land Register data, which excludes lakes, ponds, glaciers > 1 km^{2} (0.386 sq mi or 247 acres) and river estuaries.

Bicqueley (French pronunciation: [biklɛ]) is a commune in the Meurthe-et-Moselle department in northeastern France. It is located approximately 5 miles (8.0 km) south of Toul.

== Population ==
Historical population
Year	Pop.	±% p.a.
1968	513	—
1975	542	+0.79%
1982	681	+3.32%
1990	797	+1.99%
1999	792	−0.07%
2007	898	+1.58%
2012	935	+0.81%
2017	902	−0.72%
2023	925	+0.42%
Source: INSEE

== See also ==
- Communes of the Meurthe-et-Moselle department
