= Goussancourt Aerodrome =

- Part of American Expeditionary Forces (AEF)
- Located near: Goussancourt, France
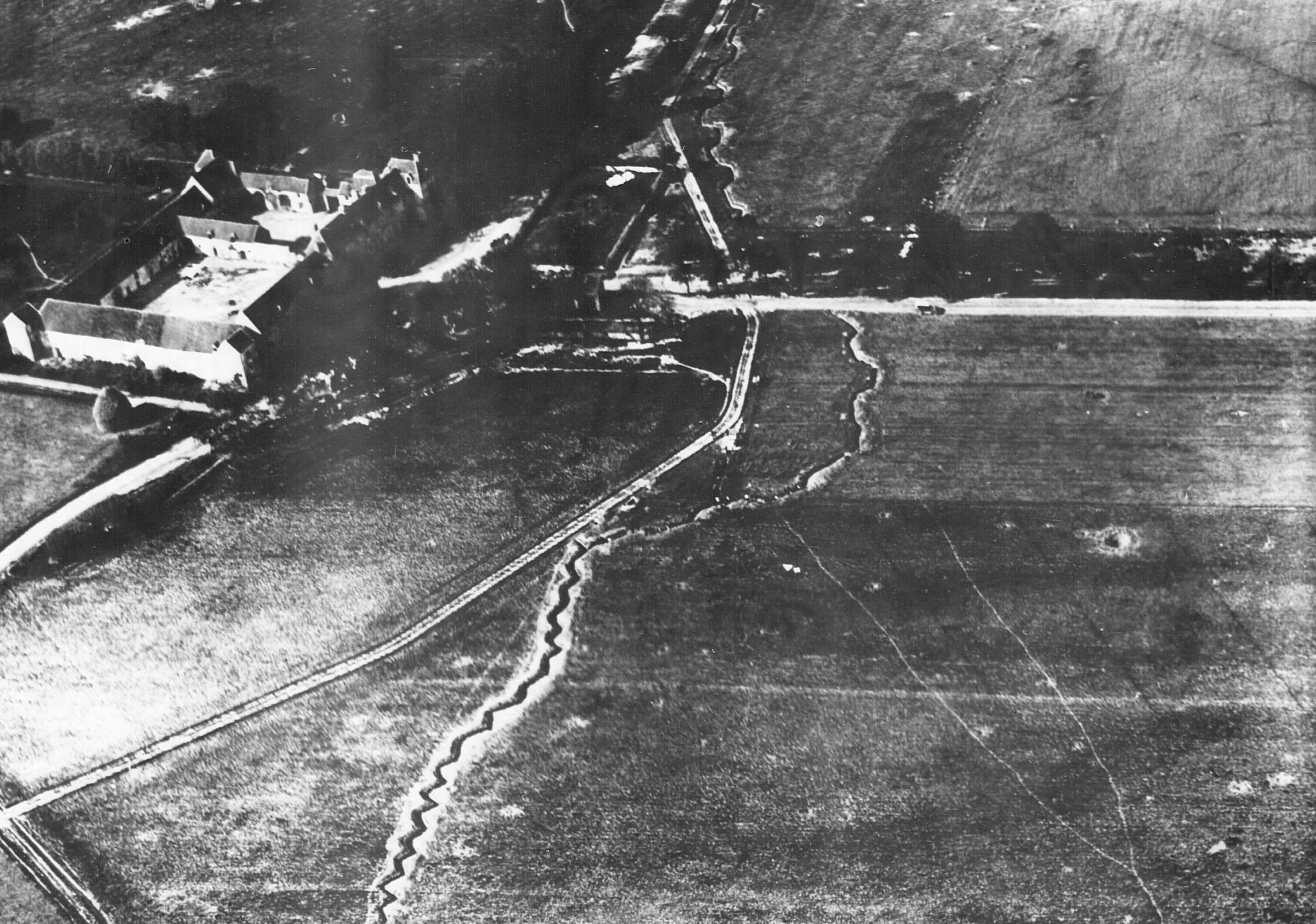
- Front line trenches near Goussancourt, France. Taken by the 88th Aero Squadron flying about 200m, September, 1918

Site information
- Type: Combat Airfield
- Controlled by: Air Service, United States Army
- Condition: Agricultural area

Location
- Coordinates: 49°09′57″N 03°40′10″E; Approximate Location

Site history
- Built: 1918
- In use: 1918–1919
- Battles/wars: World War I

Garrison information
- Garrison: III Corps Observation Group; United States First Army Air Service

Goussancourt Aerodrome, was a temporary World War I airfield in France. It was located near the commune of Goussancourt, in the Aisne department in Picardy in northern France.

== Overview ==
This temporary airfield was organized in early September, 1918, while to Allied armies were pushing back the German forces. It was mainly used by "escadrilles" of the French 5th Army Air Service from 11 September until 3 November 1918, but it first served as a forward operating airfield for the 88th Aero Squadron on 4–9 September, used for battlefield observation/aerial reconnaissance flights over the Vesle Sector for the benefit of the American III Corps, First Army. At Goussancourt, which was located about 10 km from the front line trenches, the enemy had superiority of the air. There were very few American pursuit planes operating and the airfield was attacked on several occasions by German aircraft during the day and bombers were heard at night attacking the trench lines. The squadron moved back to the Ferme des Greves Aerodrome.

The airfield likely consisted of a few tents to support squadron personnel and perhaps a few canvas aircraft hangars when the French units arrived. It had been organized on the southwest side of the Goussancourt village, soon turned back to agriculture after the Armistice. No evidence of its existence remains.

== Known units assigned ==
- 88th Aero Squadron (Observation) 4–9 September 1918

== See also ==
- List of Air Service American Expeditionary Force aerodromes in France
