= Frank Moore =

Frank Moore may refer to:

== Writers and artists ==
- Frank Moore (journalist) (1828–1904), American journalist and compiler
- Frank Moore (performance artist) (1946–2013), American performance artist
- Frank C. Moore (painter) (1953–2002), New York-based painter
- Frank Frankfort Moore (1855–1931), British dramatist, novelist and poet
- Frank Gardner Moore (1865–1955), American Latin scholar
- Frank Montague Moore (1877–1967), painter and the first director of the Honolulu Academy of Arts

== Others ==
- Frank Moore (American actor) (1880–1924), American stage actor; appeared in His Majesty, the Scarecrow of Oz
- Frank Moore (Canadian actor) (born 1946), Canadian film, television and stage actor
- Frank Moore (baseball) (1877–1964), pitcher in Major League Baseball
- Frank Moore (horse racing) (1925–?), Australian jockey
- Frank Moore (rower) (born 1952), Irish Olympic rower
- Sir Frank Moore (tourism advocate) (1930–2024), major figure in tourism development in Australia
- Frank A. Moore (1844–1918), American politician and judge in the state of Oregon
- Frank C. Moore (politician) (1896–1978), American lawyer and politician
- Frank E. Moore (1933–2019), Republican member of the Pennsylvania House of Representatives
- Frank Moore (political activist) (1867–1940), New Zealand political activist
- Frank Murchison Moore (1894–1918), United States Army Air Service officer

== See also ==
- Frank Moore Colby (1865–1925), American educator and writer
- Frank Moore Cross (1921–2012), professor emeritus of the Harvard Divinity School
- Francis Moore (disambiguation)
- Moore (surname)
