= Pretz-en-Argonne Aerodrome =

Former World War I airfield

- Part of American Expeditionary Forces (AEF)
- Located near: Pretz-en-Argonne, France

Site information
- Type: Combat Airfield
- Controlled by: Air Service, United States Army
- Condition: Agricultural area

Location
- Coordinates: 48°57′23″N 005°08′49″E; Approximate Location

Site history
- Built: 1918
- In use: 1918–1919
- Battles/wars: World War I

Garrison information
- Garrison: III Corps Observation Group; United States First Army Air Service

Pretz-en-Argonne Aerodrome, was a temporary World War I airfield in France. It was located near the commune of Pretz-en-Argonne, in the Meuse department in Lorraine in northeastern France.

== Overview ==
The airfield might have been initially built by/for French Air Service as two of its "escadrilles" were stationed in Pretz until 13 September 1918. American 88th Aero Squadron spent a short spell in Pretz, 14–20 September, before go back to Souilly Aerodrome to be part of the newly formed III Corps Observation Group. The next day, a French escadrille BR 236 arrived at PRetz, from where it flew heavy artillery mission for the American First Army until the end of war - it left the field on 25 November. Despite its very short time of use by the American Air Service, le field became known as Bregnet Field. The precise location of the airfield is undetermined, and presumably after the war, the airfield was abandoned and returned to agricultural use.

== Known units assigned ==
- 88th Aero Squadron (Observation) 14–20 September 1918

== See also ==
- List of Air Service American Expeditionary Force aerodromes in France
