= Francis Moore =

Francis Moore is the name of:

- Francis Moore (astrologer) (1657–1715), English physician, astrologer, and publisher of Old Moore's Almanack
- Sir Francis Moore (barrister) (1558–1621), English barrister and Under Steward of Oxford University
- Francis Moore (geographer) (bap. 1708, d. in or after 1756), British travel writer
- Francis Moore (ice hockey) (1900–1976), Canadian ice hockey player and Olympic silver medalist
- Francis Moore (Medal of Honor) (1858–?), American sailor and Medal of Honor recipient
- Francis Daniels Moore (1913–2001), American surgeon
- Francis W. Moore Jr. (1808–1864), second mayor of Houston, Texas
- Francis Moore (cricketer) (1827–1900), English cricketer

== See also ==
- Francis More (by 1525–1575), MP
- Frank Moore (disambiguation)
