= Charles Plummer =

Charles or Charlie Plummer may refer to:

- Charles F. Plummer (1879–1939), American architect
- Charles Plummer (historian) (1851–1927), English historian and cleric
- Charles Plummer (sheriff) (1930–2018), American law enforcement officer
- Charles W. Plummer (1890–1918), American aviator
- Charles L. Plummer, United States Air Force general
- Charlie Plummer (born 1999), American actor
