= 90th Aero Squadron =

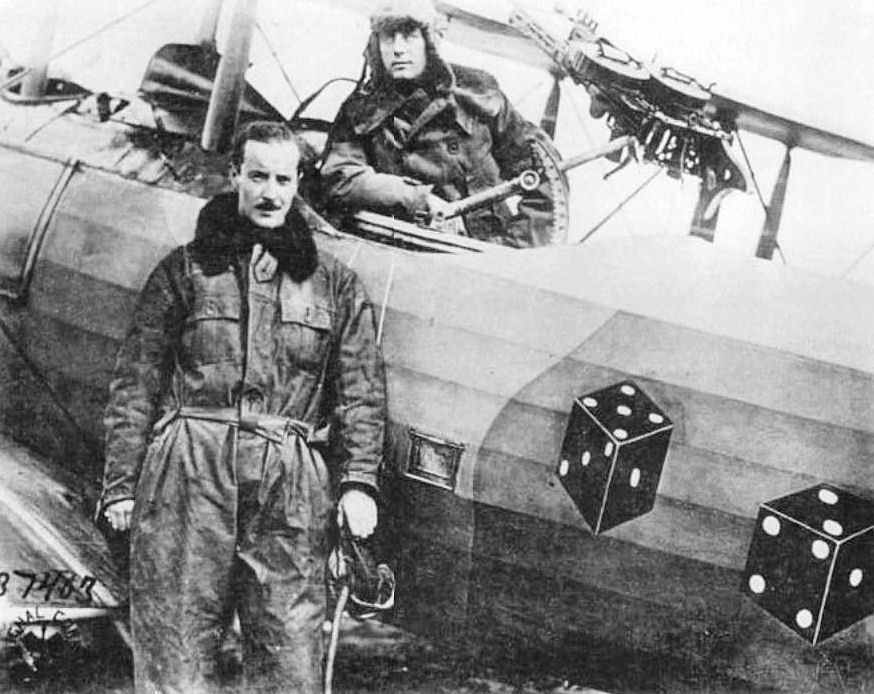
- 90th Aero Squadron – Capt. W. G. Schauffler – Standing Lt. Fred Tillman – Seated in a Salmson 2A2, Bethelainville Aerodrome, France, 11 November 1918
- Active: 20 August 1917 – Present
- Country: United States
- Branch: Air Service, United States Army
- Type: Squadron
- Role: Corps Observation
- Part of: American Expeditionary Forces (AEF)
- Engagements: World War I

Commanders
- Notable commanders: Maj J. L. Dunsworth; Lt William G. Schauffler Jr. Lt H. M. Gallop; Lt Norris E. Pierson

Insignia
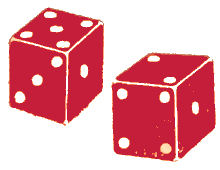
- 90th Aero Squadron Emblem

Aircraft flown
- Fighter: Sopwith 1½ Strutter, 1918; SPAD S.XI, 1918–1919
- Reconnaissance: Salmson 2A2, 1918–1919; Breguet 14 A.2, 1918–1919

Service record
- Operations: III Corps Observation Group; Western Front, France: 11 June-11 November 1918: Combat missions: 256; Enemy combats: 49; Note: Limited amount of statistics available, records from 1 September-11 November 1918 only.
- Victories: Enemy Aircraft shot down: 7; Enemy Balloons shot down: 0; Total Enemy Aircraft Destroyed: 7

The 90th Aero Squadron was an Air Service, United States Army unit that fought on the Western Front during World War I.

The squadron was assigned as a Corps Observation Squadron, performing short-range, tactical reconnaissance over the III Corps, United States First Army sector of the Western Front in France, providing battlefield intelligence. After the 1918 Armistice with Germany, the squadron returned to the United States in May 1919 and became part of the permanent United States Army Air Service in 1921, being re-designated as the 90th Squadron (Surveillance).

The current United States Air Force unit which holds its lineage and history is the 90th Fighter Squadron, assigned to the 3d Operations Group, Joint Base Elmendorf-Richardson, Alaska.

== History ==
=== Origins ===
The 90th Fighter Squadron origins begin with Special Order 104, Headquarters Kelly Field, San Antonio, Texas, on 25 September 1917. The men in it were largely from two detachments; one from Vancouver Barracks, Washington, which arrived at Kelly Field on 18 August; another from Fort Leavenworth, Kansas, which arrived on 25 August. Both of these detachments had been held from the date of their arrival until 25 September under Recruit Camp Headquarters as a Provisional Squadron.

The first few months of its existence were consumed by the necessary training to prepare the men for operations in France during World War I. On 30 September, the squadron left Kelly Field for the Aviation Concentration Center, Camp Mills, Garden City, New York, Long Island, where it arrived five days later. On the night of 5 October the squadron detrained, and early next morning hiked out to Field No. 2 of the Aviation Concentration Center (Hazelhurst Field), where they were quartered with the Headquarters of the First Provisional Wing in Barracks No. 5. Here they stayed for several weeks performing guard duty and fatigue work, and carrying on the work of organization, equipment and preparation for overseas duty.

On 26 October, orders were received to pack up equipment and to prepare for immediate overseas departure. The following day the squadron was moved to Pier 54, New York Harbor, and boarded the SS Orduna. The crossing of the Atlantic was uneventful, and on 10 November the Orduna moved into the dock at Liverpool, England. No stop was made in Liverpool; a train was waiting and the squadron was carried on to Southampton, and then given a march of an hour and a half to a "Rest Camp." On 12 November the squadron crossed the English Channel on the transport "Prince George," arriving in Le Havre early on the 13th, and marched at once to British Rest Camp No. 2. Here they remained several days. On 18 November the 90th entrained for Colombey-les-Belles Airdrome, northeast of Neufchateau and south of Toul. After a long and tiresome trip, the destination was reached during the night of 20 November, and the next morning the men were billetted in lofts scattered through the village.

=== Combat in France ===
==== Staging and training ====
At Colombey, it was announced that the 90th was to do road and barracks construction work for the time being. Naturally this came as a great disappointment to all. However, the experience gained in construction work would be valuable, and the time could be profitably employed in fitting the right men into the right places. It was with these feelings that officers and men set to work on the first job assigned, the construction of roads through what was to become the great American Aviation Field at Colombey. This lasted the rest of the year.

For the first three months of 1918 the squadron, together with the 88th and 89th Aero Squadrons, was to start the construction of the barracks and hangars of the Colombey Field. This was a piece of work of which the squadrons which took part might well be proud, as the buildings were erected with little delay in the very worst part of a particularly severe winter. The period of apprenticeship was now passed and the 90th was designated as a Service (Combat) Squadron.

On 15 April 1918, fifteen British Sopwith 1½ Strutter observation planes arrived from Orly Field, Paris and six pilots were assigned to the squadron. No flying was done for the first few days after the arrival of the Sopwiths, but the mechanics were assigned to their respective planes and spent the time in studying their construction. On 19 April the squadron moved to Amanty Airdrome, north of Neufchateau, and was designated as a Corps Observation squadron. Amanty was where the 1st Observation Group Training Center was located. Here it was engaged in training flights. The flying personnel was changing constantly, pilots and observers being attached for a short time and then transferred to Pursuit or bombing squadrons.

==== St. Mihiel Offensive ====
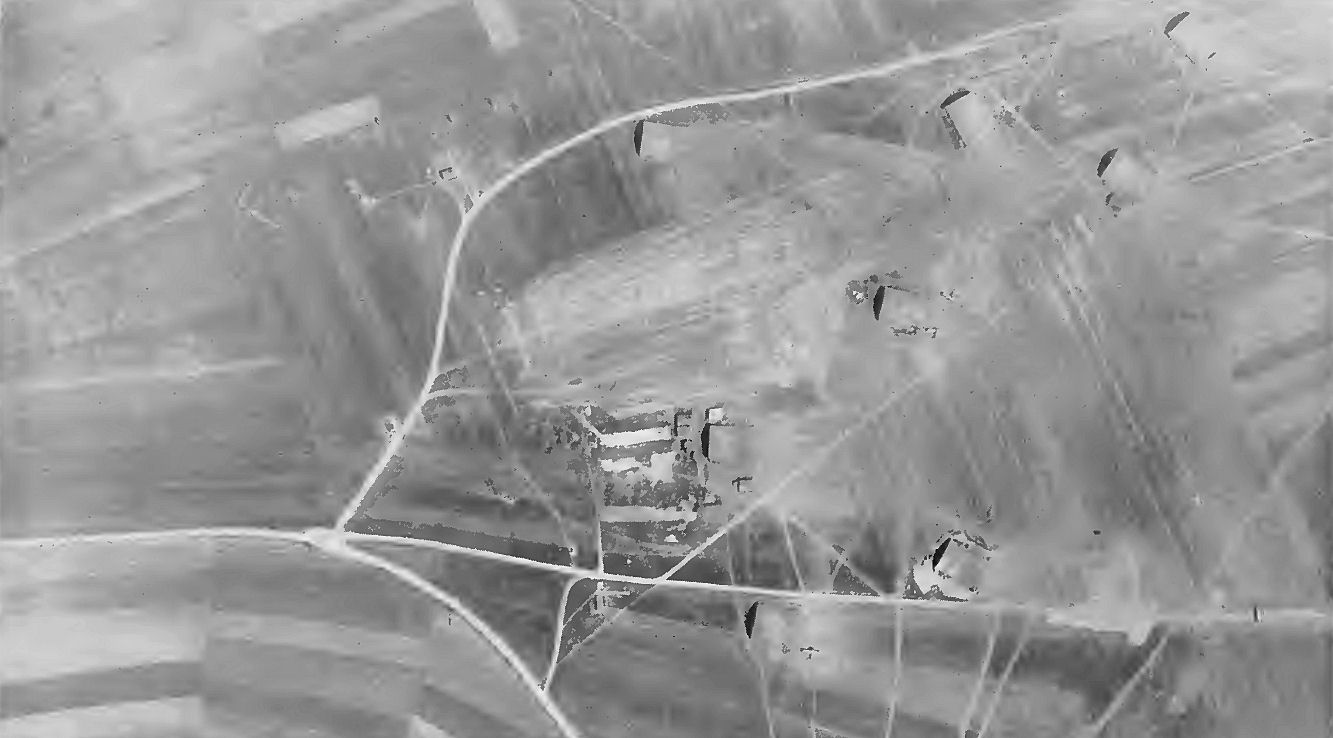
Ourches Aerodrome – France, July 1918

On 13 June the 90th Aero Squadron received its first assignment to combat duty, moving to Ourches Aerodrome, fifteen kilometers due west of Toul, on the Meuse River. Like many divisions of Infantry the squadron was to do its first real work in the famous "American Sector" of the line, which at that time extended from Apremont-la-Forêt, east of Saint-Mihiel, to Limey-Remenauville, west of the Moselle River. The first mission to go over the lines was a general reconnaissance of the sector on 16 June. The reconnaissance covered the sector from Apremont to Xivray-et-Marvoisin; the first compliments of the Germans to the 90th were received in the shape of an Archie (Anti-Aircraft Artillery) barrage.

On 20 June Lieut. William G. Schauffler, took command, Lieutenant Schauffler came to the 90th from the 1st Aero Squadron. With this squadron he had seen service on the Mexican border in 1916 and had the honor of being the first pilot of an American squadron to fly over the front in France the year before. The work during July was the regular aerial work for a Corps Squadron on a quiet sector. Two regular reconnaissance flights were made each day and during good weather photographic missions were carried out. The 90th was alone on the field and took care of all the work assigned to the IV Corps Observation Group.

The British Sopwiths, with which the squadron did all their early work, never proved very satisfactory on the front. They were rather slow, and their elastic construction never inspired a great deal of confidence. Hence it was with great relief that the squadron saw them being replaced with other aircraft, though at first these latter were of several types, and made of the 90th the strangest hybrid Squadron in the AEF. Early in July a few French SPAD S.XIs arrived. On 19 July the first of the Salmson 2A2s arrived. Shortly afterward three Breguet 14 A.2s were assigned to the 90th, so that on 31 July the squadron equipment included sixteen Salmsons, eight Sopwiths, four Spads, and three Breguets.

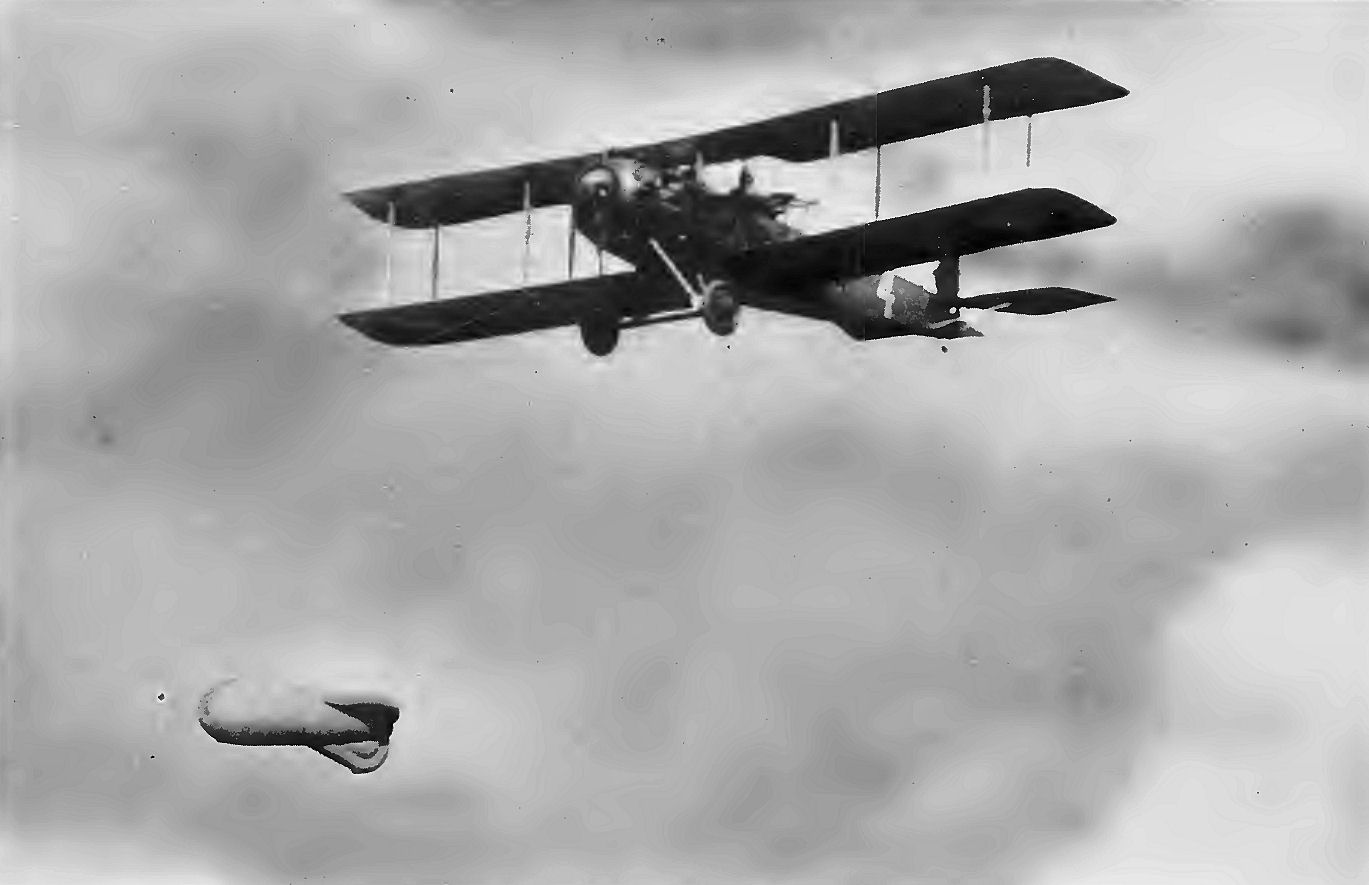
90th Aero Squadron – Salmson 2A2 in Flight.

The object of the Breguets was to give the squadron practice in night flying. This had been attempted in Sopwiths, but had resulted only in the salvaging of numerous machines. After the arrival of the Breguets the experiment was once more undertaken, but without success. The airfield at Ourches was uneven with slopes and valleys.

On the night of 31 July, the 90th was host to a small German bombing raid. The officers and men heard the planes overhead, and identified them as German Gotha G.V bombers by the sound of their motors. They dropped seven small bombs, three of which landed within twenty feet of the hangars; but by great good fortune did no damage beyond a few holes in the field, and these were filled in before daylight. In addition to the regular corps photographic work which the 90th was doing, they carried out a considerable number of Infantry Contact patrols near Chaumont, taking part in exercises with newly arrived divisions. A few adjustments of artillery with French batteries in the woods north of Boucq were also carried out.

The first work of great importance which came to the squadron was its part in the operations which resulted in the Battle of Saint-Mihiel, 12–15 September 1918. The two weeks preceding were spent in much careful preparatory work. A great deal of photographic work was done, among other missions being the photographing of the lines from Apremont to Limy at an altitude of 350 meters.

==== Meuse-Argonne Offensive ====
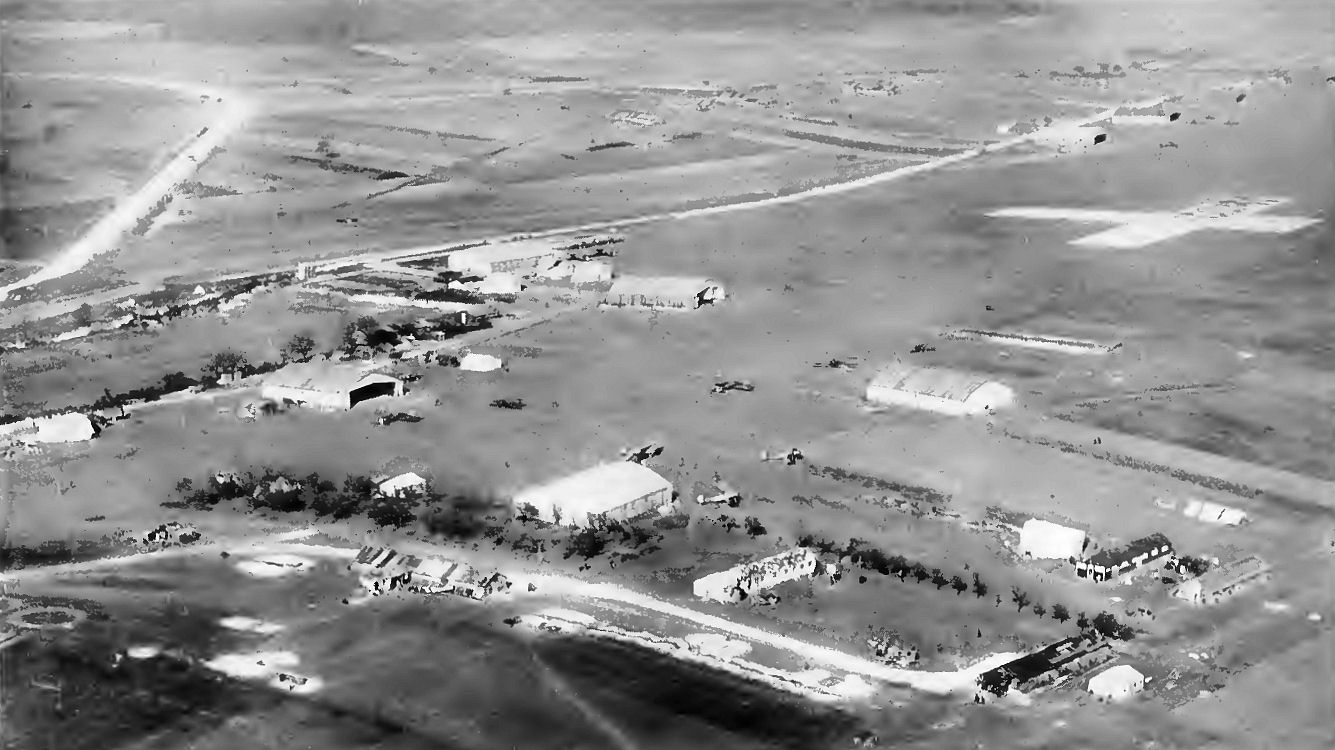
Souilly Aerodrome, France, October 1918

On 20 September the squadron moved from Ourches to Souilly Aerodrome, southwest of Verdun, transferring from the IV Corps to the III Corps Observation Group. With this it was to work during the Meuse-Argonne Offensive, which terminated only with the armistice. In spite of the long distance which the squadron moved, there was no great delay in activity, and in a day or so the squadron was operating on the new sector. From 22 to 26 September the squadron made only short reconnaissance flights back of the American lines to acquaint the flying personnel with the new sector. This was in order that the enemy might not notice increased aerial activity on the sector and foresee the coming attack.

The United States First Army struck the first blow of the Meuse-Argonne Offensive on the morning of 26 September, and offensive operations continued almost without cessation until 11 November. At the start the 90th was operating with two divisions of the III Corps, but on 11 October, one-half of the squadron was assigned to duty with the 17th French Corps on the east bank of the Meuse. The squadron continued to operate from the airdrome at Souilly, under orders of the 3d Observation Group.

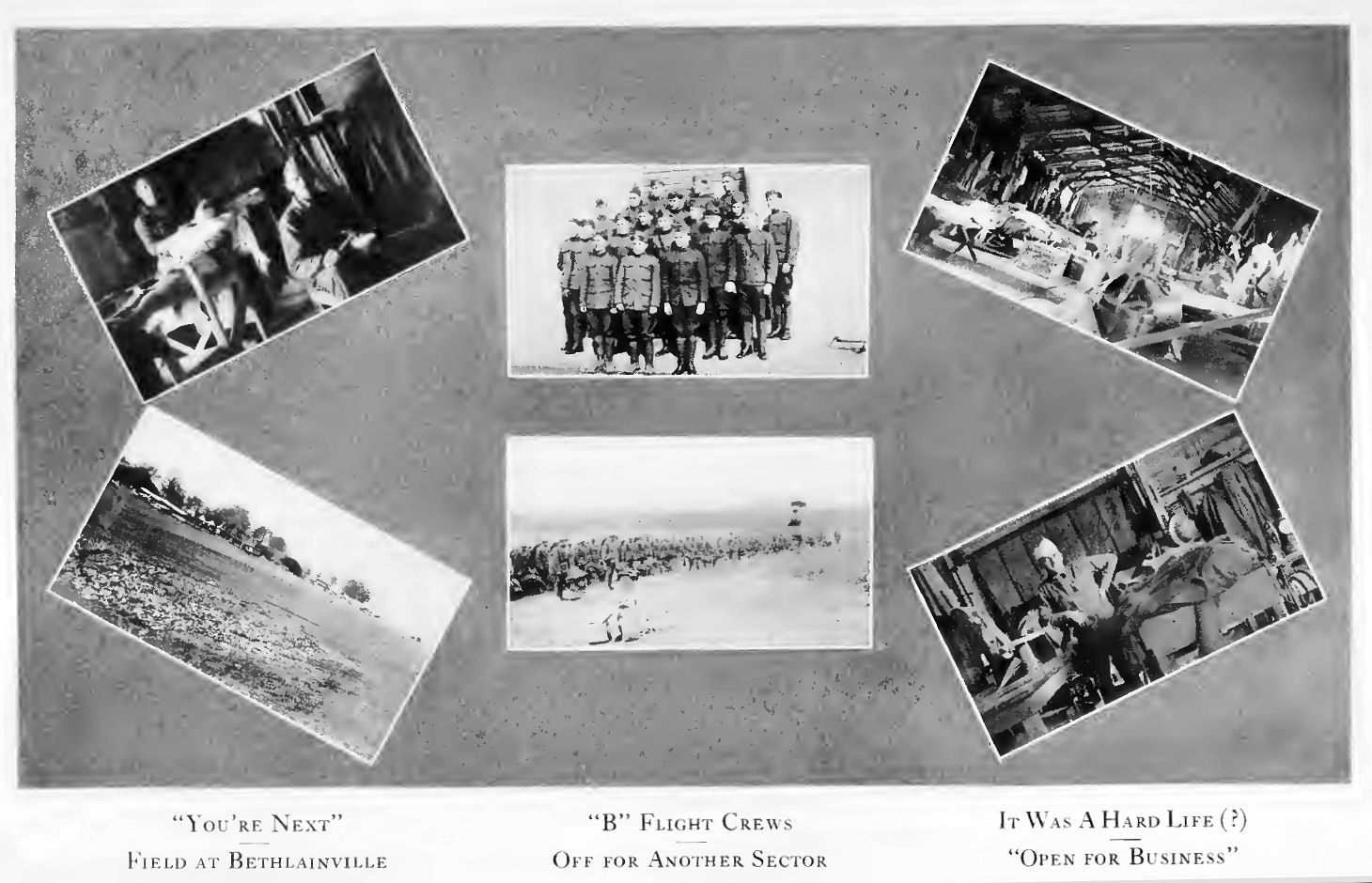
90th Aero Squadron – miscellaneous Photographs.

The squadron worked with the 80th Division from 26 September to 11 October; with the 33d Division from 26 September to 22 October; on the west bank of the Meuse. On 11 October the 5th Division relieved the 80th and the squadron continued our work with It. On 22 October the squadron was attached to the 90th Division, on the west bank of the Meuse, and in the neighborhood of Romagne and eastward. In place of the 5th Division. Till 22 October the squadron worked with the 29th Division on the east bank of the Meuse, until this division was relieved by the 79th Division, with whom work was continued until the cessation of hostilities. The squadron also continued work with the 90th Division until 11 November.

As in the St. Mlhiel operations, the squadron had to contend with very bad weather. Owing to the season of the year and the proximity of the Meuse River Valley, the atmospheric conditions were almost always unfavorable. Heavy clouds and constant rains increased the difficulty of reconnaissances. The ground mists of the mornings, which seldom cleared up before 10 or 11 o'clock, added much to the difficulty. But in spite of the poor visibility which made the average altitude at which the planes could work about 300 meters, several daily reconnaissances were made. Flying at a very low altitude, the squadron planes daily penetrated the hostile lines to a depth of from three to five kilometers, bringing back information as to our own front line, position of hostile troops, batteries in action, fires, explosions, etc., and frequently a collection of bullet holes in the plane.

=== Demobilization ===
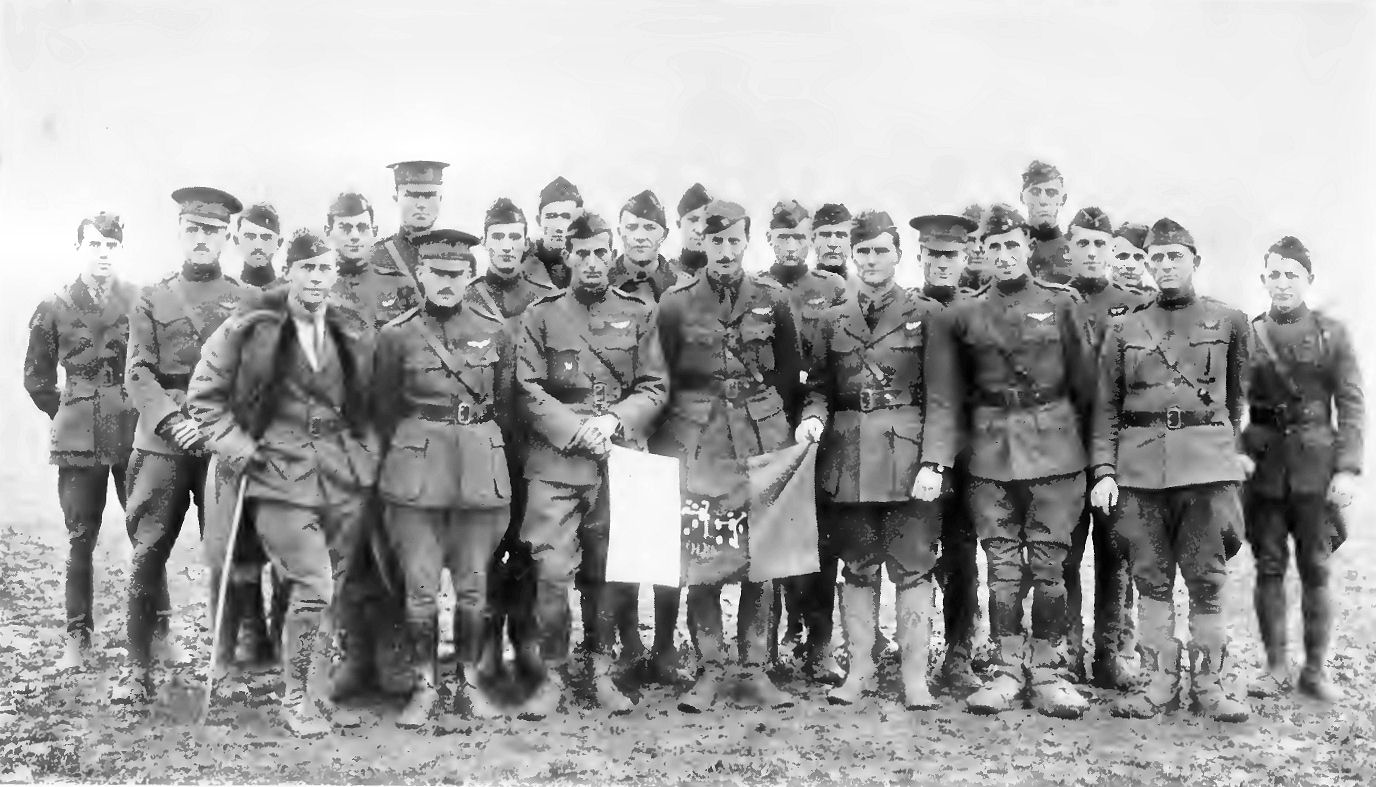
90th Aero Squadron – 11:00am 11 November 1918 Bethelainville Aerodrome, France.

Following the Armistice with Germany on 11 November 1918, little flying was done, most of the pilots and observers being absent on leave or returning to the States. On 15 January 1919 orders were received from First Army for the squadron to report to the 1st Air Depot, Colombey-les-Belles Airdrome to turn in all of its supplies and equipment and was relieved from duty with the AEF. The squadron's Salmson aircraft were delivered to the Air Service American Air Service Acceptance Park No. 1 at Orly Aerodrome to be returned to the French. There practically all of the pilots and observers were detached from the squadron.

At Colombey, very comfortable quarters were assigned and the squadron settled down to await orders to the coast. Personnel were subsequently assigned to the commanding general, services of supply, and ordered to report to the staging camp at St. Denis de Piles, near Libourne, Gironde, and the officers and enlisted personnel occupied excellent billets. There, personnel awaited scheduling to report to one of the base ports in France for transport to the United States.

Orders were received to report to the Base Port at Bordeaux, France, on 10 April, where the squadron boarded USS General G. W. Goethals and USS Susquehanna on 20 April for its transport back to the United States. After returning from France, most of the squadron demobilized at Mitchell Field and returned to civilian life. A small cadre of the unit remained in the Air Service, and were sent back to Kelly Field, Texas. At Kelly, the 90th, along with the 8th, 12th and 13th Aero Squadrons were formed into the Army Surveillance Group on 1 July 1919.

=== Lineage ===
- Organized as 90th Aero Squadron on 20 August 1917

Re-designated as: 90th Aero Squadron (Corps Observation), 19 April 1918
Re-designated as: 90th Aero Squadron, May 1919
Re-designated as: 90th Squadron (Surveillance) on 13 August 1919

=== Assignments ===
- Post Headquarters, Kelly Field, 20 August 1917
- Aviation Concentration Center, 5–26 October 1917
- American Expeditionary Forces, 12 November 1917
- 1st Air Depot, 20 November 1917
- I Corps Observation Group, 19 April 1918
- IV Corps Observation Group, 13 June 1918
- III Corps Observation Group, 21 September 1918
- I Corps Observation Group, 30 November 1918
- 1st Air Depot, 19 January 1919
- Commanding General, Services of Supply, January-19 April 1919
- Post Headquarters, Hazelhurst Field, 5 May 1919
- Post Headquarters, Kelly Field, May 1919

=== Stations ===
- Kelly Field, Texas, 20 August 1917
- Aviation Concentration Center, Garden City, New York, 5–27 October 1917
- Port of Entry, Hoboken, New Jersey

Overseas transport, SS Orduna, 26 October-12 November 1917

- Colombey-les-Belles Airdrome, France, 20 November 1917
- Amanty Airdrome, France, 19 April 1918
- Ourches Aerodrome, France, 13 June 1918
- Souilly Aerodrome, France, 20 September 1918
- Bethelainville Aerodrome, France, 29 October 1918
- Belrain Aerodrome, France, 15 January 1919
- Colombey-les-Belles Airdrome, France, 18 January 1919
- St. Denis-de-Piles staging camp, France, 25 January 1919 (near Libourne)
- Port of Bordeaux, France, 10 April 1919

Return transport, USS General G. W. Goethals and USS Susquehanna, 20 April–3 May 1919

- Hazelhurst Field, New York, 5 May 1919
- Kelly Field, Texas, c. May 1919

=== Combat sectors and campaigns ===
Streamer	Sector/Campaign	Dates	Notes
	Toul Sector	16 June-11 September 1918	
	St. Mihiel Offensive Campaign	12–16 September 1918	
	Meuse-Argonne Offensive Campaign	26 September-11 November 1918	

=== Notable personnel ===
- Lt. Horace Borden, DSC
- Lt. Hugh D. G. Broomfield, DSC, SSC (KIA)
- Lt. Harvey Conover, DSC, Croix de Guerre, Aero Club Medal of Honor
- Lt. Austin T. Foster, SSC
- Lt. Horace A. Lake, DSC, 2 aerial victories
- Lt. William O. Lowe (USMC)*, DSC, Navy Cross, 1 aerial victory
  : * Attached as observer to 90th Aero Squadron
- Lt. Bertrande C. Neidecker, DSC, 1 aerial victory
- Lt. John S. Young, SSC

DSC: Distinguished Service Cross; SSC: Silver Star Citation; KIA: Killed in Action

== See also ==
- List of American aero squadrons
- Organization of the Air Service of the American Expeditionary Force
