= Frank Murchison Moore =

U.S. military officer

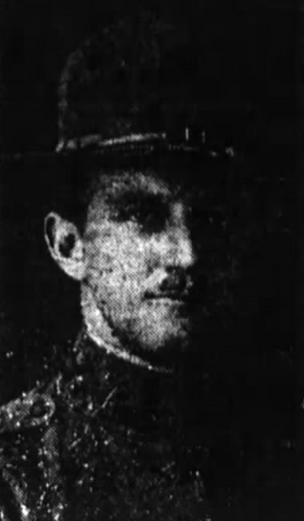
- Born: 4 July 1894; Houston, Texas, US
- Died: 2 September 1918 (aged 24)
- Education: Washington & Lee University
- Occupation: U.S. Army Air Service aviator
- Awards: Citation Star

Second Lieutenant Frank Murchison Moore (4 July 1894 - 2 September 1918) was an officer with the United States Army Air Service during the Great War. He was killed in action in the waning months of that conflict. Moore Air Force Base, northwest of Mission, Texas, was named in his honor.

== Background ==
Moore was a native of Houston, Texas. He attended Washington & Lee University from 1912 to 1916.

== Service ==
Moore joined the Army Air Service in 1917 as part of the Officers Reserve Corps. He served as an artillery observer with 7th Field Artillery, flying with 88th Aero Squadron, under the 26th Division.

Missions assigned the 88th involved: short-range visual reconnaissance, short-range photographic, adjustment of light artillery fire, and infantry contact probes.

== Death ==
Moore was killed in action on 2 September 1918, during the Battle of Fismes and Fismette. While flying from Ferme des Greves Aerodrome, he was shot down during combat with eight German aircraft near Fismes, France, killed in the crash landing. One source says that he shot down three enemy aircraft during that action but no official credit to that fact can be found.

== Honors ==
Moore was posthumously awarded the Citation Star.

The citation:

GENERAL ORDERS:
GHQ, American Expeditionary Forces, Citation Orders No. 9 (August 1, 1920)

CITATION:
By direction of the President, under the provisions of the act of Congress approved July 9, 1918 (Bul. No. 43, W.D., 1918), Second Lieutenant (Air Service) Frank M. Moore, United States Army Air Service, is cited (Posthumously) by the Commanding General, American Expeditionary Forces, for gallantry in action and a silver star may be placed upon the ribbon of the Victory Medals awarded him. Second Lieutenant Moore distinguished himself by gallantry in action while serving with 88th Aero Squadron, American Expeditionary Forces, in action during the Oise-Aisne Offensive, France, while fighting an aerial rear guard action when attacked by the enemy.

== Commemoration ==
Moore Air Force Base was established in September 1941 as Moore Field, a 1,087-acre facility, fourteen miles northwest of Mission, Texas.

The airfield was the home of the 503d, 504th and 506th school squadrons, Army Air Forces Pilot School (Advanced Single Engine), the flying training units. The flying school was redesignated as the 2d Training Group in 1943.

The facility conducted advanced pilot training of 6,000 pilots using BT-13, PT-19, AT-6, P-36 and P-43 aircraft. The school was reorganized as the 2529th Army Air Force Base Unit (Pilot School, Advanced Single Engine) on 1 April 1944. The school and airfield were closed on 31 October 1945.

It was reactivated as a training base 1 April 1955, closing again 1 February 1961. It remained on inactivated status until 15 July 1963, when it closed for good. Part of the installation was sold to private entities and the rest was transferred to the Department of Agriculture.
