= Moore Air Force Base =

Former US base in Hidalgo County, Texas

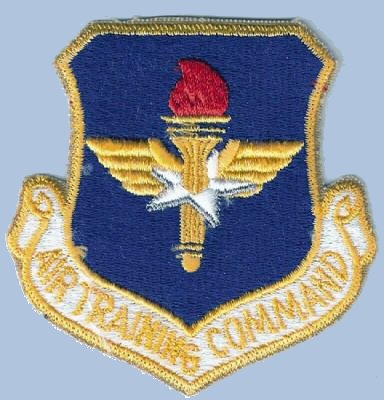
Moore Air Base Moore Field
- Part of Air Training Command (ATC)
- Hidalgo County, near McAllen, Texas
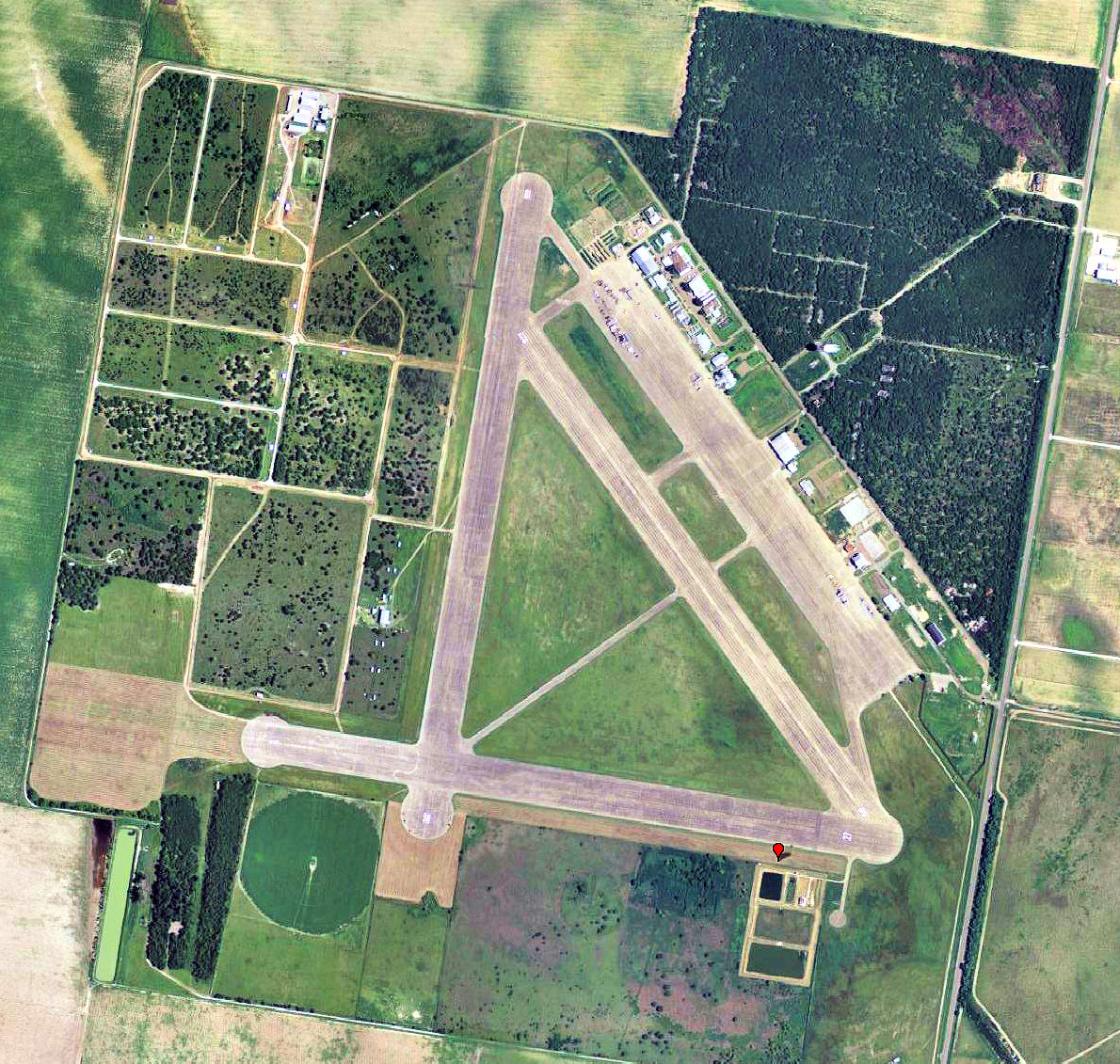
- 2006 USGS Airphoto

Site information
- Type: Air Base
- Controlled by: United States Air Force

Location
- Coordinates: 26°23′01″N 98°20′01″W

Site history
- Built: 1941
- In use: 1941–1961

Garrison information
- Garrison: Air Training Command
- Occupants: 3301st Pilot Training Group (Contract Primary)

Moore Field 1944 Classbook

Moore Air Base is an inactive United States Air Force facility located 14 mi (23 km) northwest of Mission, Texas. It was deactivated on 1 February 1961. The installation was sold to private concerns and partially transferred to the Department of Agriculture on 15 July 1963.

== History ==
=== World War II ===
Moore Field was opened on 20 September 1941 as an Army Air Forces Training Command single-engined aircraft training school. It was named for Second Lt. Frank Murchison Moore, on 22 November. Moore was a native of Houston, who was killed on 2 September 1918, during the Battle of Fismes and Fismette in World War I. The 1,087-acre (4.40 km^{2}) airfield was the home of the 503d, 504th, and 506th school squadrons, Army Air Forces Pilot School (Advanced Single Engine), the flying training units. The flying school was redesignated as the 2d Training Group in 1943.

The facility conducted advanced pilot training of 6,000 pilots using BT-13, PT-19, AT-6, P-36, and P-43 aircraft. The school was reorganized as the 2529th Army Air Force Base Unit (Pilot School, Advanced Single Engine) on 1 April 1944. The school and airfield were closed on 31 October 1945.

=== Postwar use ===
In 1950, part of the field was operating as the Weaver H. Baker Memorial Sanatorium, and part was jointly operated by Mission, McAllen, and Edinburg as Tri-Cities Municipal Airport.

=== Contract flying base ===
In June 1954, after the closing of the sanatorium and as part of the Cold War military expansion by the United States, the United States Air Force announced that Moore Field would be reactivated as a contract pilot training school under the Air Training Command, which had planned to reopen the base in 1954, but delayed the reopening 12 months due to a freeze in military construction budgets.

The 3301st Pilot Training Group (Contract Primary) was reassigned to Moore from Columbus AFB, Mississippi, on 1 April 1955. Training was conducted by California Eastern Airways Incorporated, using T-28s and T-34s. In August 1959, Moore began using jet-powered T-37s in place of the T-28s. With the upgrade to jet trainers, the contractor at the base was changed to Beiser Aviation Corporation.

In 1960, plans were made by Air Training Command to redesign the flight training program, and consolidate its flight schools. As a result of the Consolidated Pilot Training (CPT) program, contractor flying schools were planned to be phased out. All contract primary training ended at Moore in December, but several ground training classes continued at the base until 1 February 1961, when the 3301st was inactivated. Some 4,000 Air Force pilots received their primary flight training and academic instruction by the 3301st at Moore Air Force Base.

=== Closure and current use ===
Although inactivated, Moore Air Force Base remained in Air Force hands until 15 July 1963, when it was finally closed. Part of the installation was sold to private entities, and the rest was transferred to the Department of Agriculture (USDA).

Under control of the USDA, it was used as part of the program to eradicate the screwworm fly. It continues to be known as Moore Air Force Base under this new mission. In 1977, scientists of the Screwworm Research Unit relocated from the laboratory at Moore Air Force Base to the sterile fly production facility near Tuxtla Gutiérrez, Chiapas, Mexico. on June 18, 2025, US Secretary of Agriculture Brooke Rollins announced that the base would be once again used as a location for a U.S.-based sterile-fly dispersal facility as a response to the 2025 resurgence of the screwworm fly in southern Mexico.

Today, Moore Field Airport (FAA Identifier: 7TE7) is still controlled by the USDA as a private airport. It is gated and not open to the public. The buildings on the flightline area are being used and in good condition. The cantonment area is overgrown and abandoned, with remainders of streets in various states of deterioration, and the World War II-era water tower still is standing and being maintained. A few abandoned buildings can be seen in the containment area, inaccessible and surrounded by vegetation. All three runways are in excellent condition, as is the ramp area, with eight aircraft assigned to the field. Permission is required prior to landing aircraft at the facility.

== See also ==
- Texas World War II Army Airfields
- 77th Flying Training Wing (World War II)
