= Béthelainville Aerodrome =

- Part of American Expeditionary Forces (AEF)
- Located near: Béthelainville, France
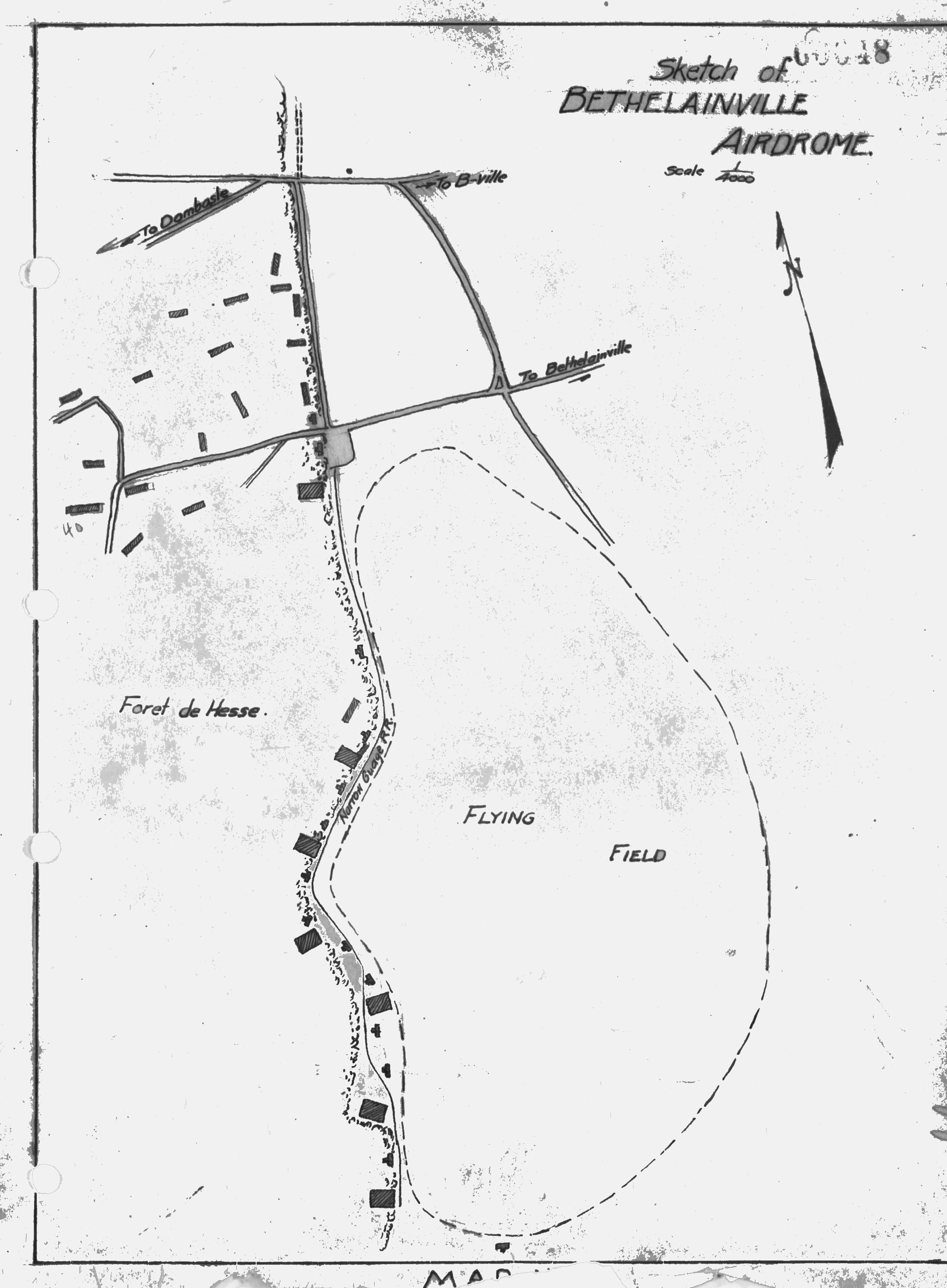

Site information
- Type: Combat Airfield
- Controlled by: Air Service, United States Army
- Condition: Agricultural area

Location
- Coordinates: 49°09′54″N 005°13′18″E

Site history
- Built: 1918
- In use: 1918–1919
- Battles/wars: World War I

Garrison information
- Garrison: III Corps Observation Group; United States First Army Air Service

Béthelainville Aerodrome was a temporary World War I airfield in France, used by squadrons of the Air Service, United States Army. It was located 0.5 miles (0.80 km) southwest of Béthelainville, approximately 8 miles (13 km) west of the city of Verdun, in the Meuse department in the Lorraine region in northeastern France.

== Overview ==
A lease was acquired for the land in early September 1918, and a construction squadron began work on building the airfield initially on 20 September. Seven French "Bessonneau" aircraft hangars were erected, along with 11 American tents and three additional French tents. Béthelainville Aerodrome was designed for short-term use and no telephone or electrical systems were installed.

The airfield was turned over to the First Army Air Service on 12 October, being assigned to the III Corps Observation Group, during the Meuse-Argonne Campaign. It was used as a battlefield reconnaissance airfield during the offensive. Known units assigned to the field were:

- 90th Aero Squadron (Observation) 19 October – 15 January 1919 (Salmson 2A2)
- 88th Aero Squadron (Observation) 4 – 29 November 1918 (Salmson 2A2)

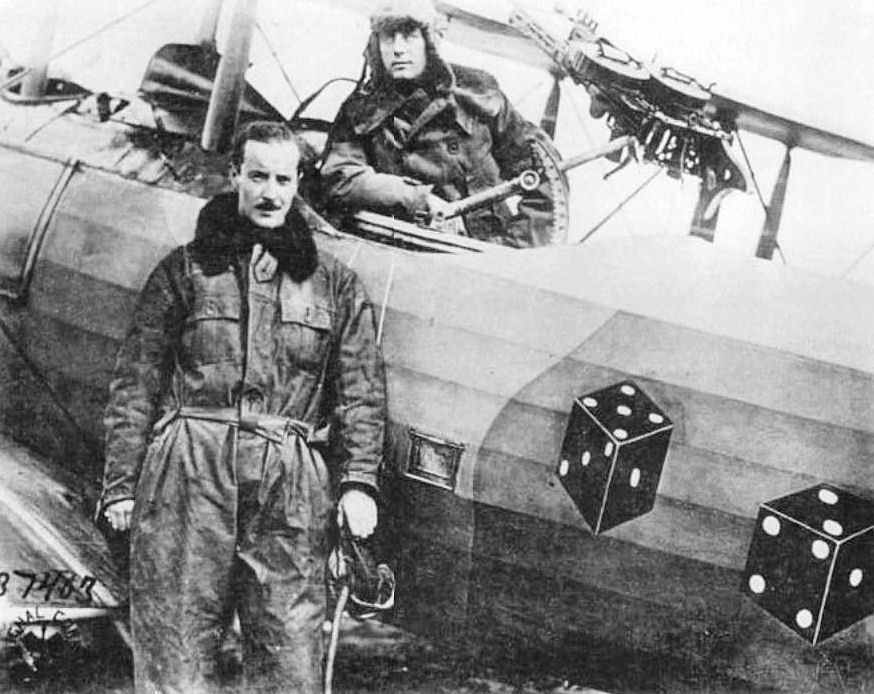
90th Aero Squadron, Salmson 2A2

The 90th Aero Squadron joined the I Corps Observation Group on 30 November 1918 and stayed at Béthelainville until 15 January 1919, then the airfield was turned over to the 1st Air Depot for de-construction. All hangars and other structures were dismantled and all useful supplies and equipment were removed and sent back to the Depot for storage. Upon completion, the land was turned over to the French government.

Eventually the land was returned to agricultural use by the local farmers. Today, what was Béthelainville Aerodrome is a cultivated field located adjacent to a forested area about a half mile west of Béthelainville, with no indications of its wartime use. The wooded area to the west of the Airfield remains a forested area.

== See also ==
- List of Air Service American Expeditionary Force aerodromes in France
