= Francis Moore (cricketer) =

English cricketer

Personal information
- Full name: Francis Moore
- Born: 18 July 1827; Nottingham, Nottinghamshire, England
- Died: 14 January 1900 (aged 72); Nottingham, Nottinghamshire, England
- Batting: Unknown
- Role: Wicket-keeper

Domestic team information
- Years: Team
- 1862: Nottinghamshire

Career statistics
Competition	First-class
Matches	1
Runs scored	12
Batting average	–
100s/50s	–/–
Top score	8*
Balls bowled	–
Wickets	–
Bowling average	–
5 wickets in innings	–
10 wickets in match	–
Best bowling	–
Catches/stumpings	–/1
- Source: Cricinfo, 22 February 2013

Francis Moore (18 July 1827 – 14 January 1900) was an English cricketer. Moore's batting style is unknown, though it is known he played as a wicket-keeper. He was born at Nottingham, Nottinghamshire.

Moore made a single first-class appearance for Nottinghamshire against Surrey at The Oval in 1862. He ended Nottinghamshire's first-innings of 172 all out unbeaten on 8, while in Surrey's first-innings of 108 all out he stumped H. H. Stephenson off the bowling of Cris Tinley. Having batted at number eleven in Nottinghamshire's first-innings, Moore opened the batting in their second-innings, scoring an unbeaten 4 runs before the match was declared a draw. This was his only major appearance for Nottinghamshire.

He died at the city of his birth on 14 January 1900.
