= Goussancourt =

- Commune
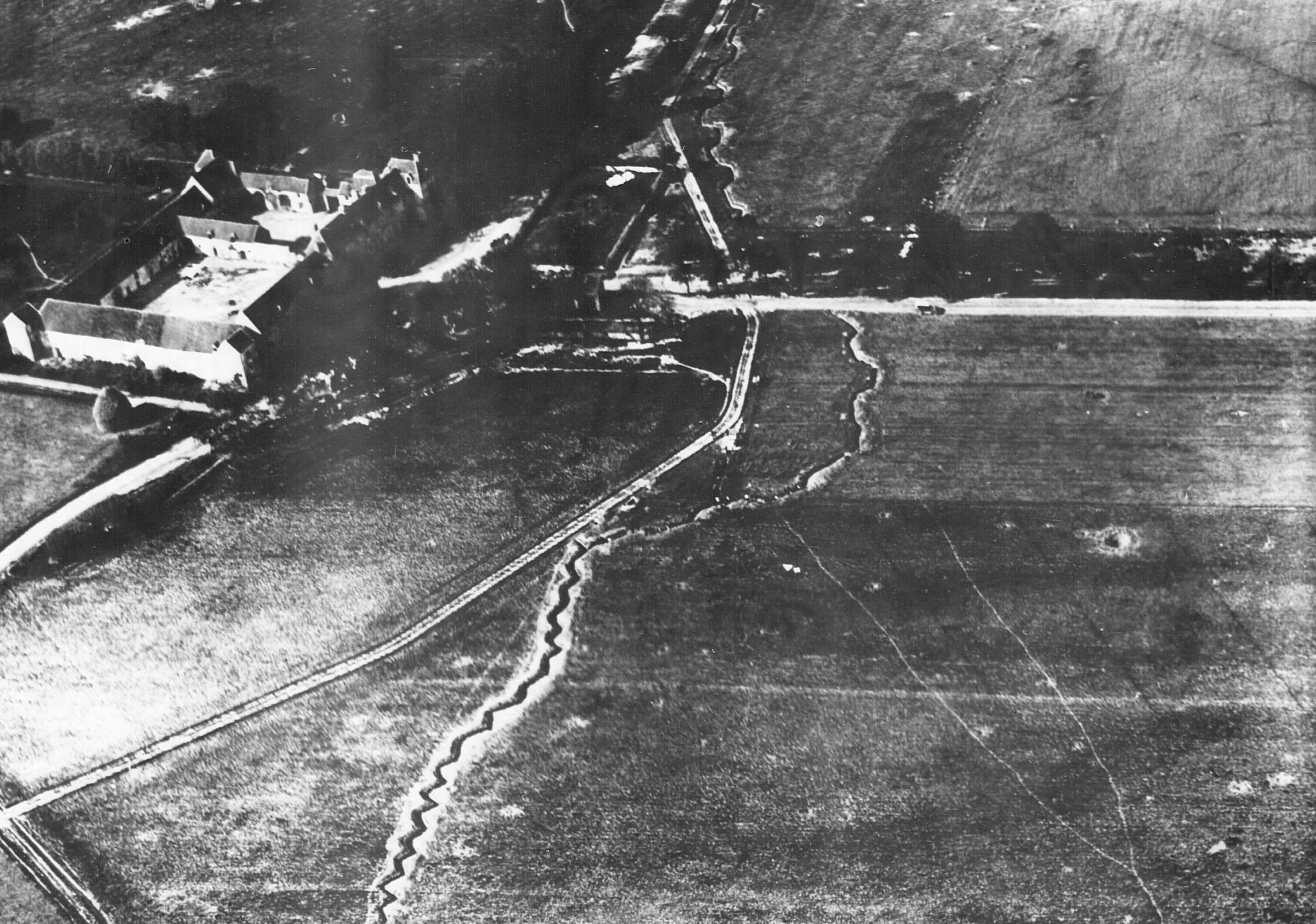
- An aerial view of the trenches near Goussancourt in 1918
- Location of Goussancourt
- Location within France Location within Hauts-de-France
- Coordinates: 49°10′02″N 3°40′05″E
- Country: France
- Region: Hauts-de-France
- Department: Aisne
- Arrondissement: Château-Thierry
- Canton: Fère-en-Tardenois
- Intercommunality: CA Région de Château-Thierry

Government
  - Mayor (2026–32): Pierre Delorme
- Area^{1}: 8.43 km^{2} (3.25 sq mi)
- Elevation: 216 m (709 ft)
- Highest elevation: 229 m (751 ft)
- Lowest elevation: 136 m (446 ft)
- Population (2023): 120
  - Density: 14/km^{2} (37/sq mi)
- Time zone: UTC+01:00 (CET)
  - Summer (DST): UTC+02:00 (CEST)
- INSEE/Postal code: 02351 /02130
- ^{1} French Land Register data, which excludes lakes, ponds, glaciers > 1 km^{2} (0.386 sq mi or 247 acres) and river estuaries.

Goussancourt (French pronunciation: [ɡusɑ̃kuʁ]) is a commune in the Aisne department in Hauts-de-France in northern France.

== Population ==
Historical population
Year	Pop.	±% p.a.
1968	124	—
1975	102	−2.75%
1982	92	−1.46%
1990	78	−2.04%
1999	68	−1.51%
2007	98	+4.67%
2012	117	+3.61%
2017	116	−0.17%
2023	120	+0.57%
Source: INSEE

== See also ==
- Communes of the Aisne department
