= Charles W. Plummer =

U.S. Army Air Service aviator

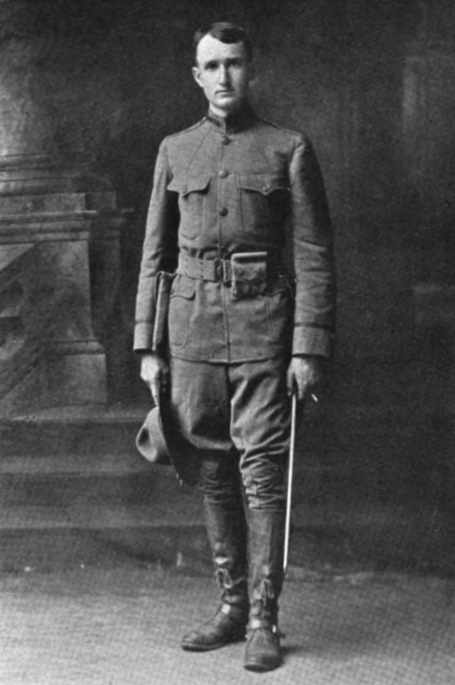
- Born: Charles Warner Plummer; May 25, 1890; New Bedford, Massachusetts
- Died: August 11, 1918 (aged 28); Marne, France
- Occupation: Aviator

Charles Warner Plummer (1890–1918) was a military aviator in the U.S. Army Air Service. Plummer defended the 88th Aero Squadron's aerial reconnaissance mission to photograph the Vesle River sector of France during World War I.

== Early life, education, and military enlistment ==
Plummer was born in New Bedford, Massachusetts, on May 25, 1890 to Henry and Alice Plummer, and he grew up on the farms of Potomska, a village near Dartmouth, Massachusetts. Plummer attended the Powder Point School and then public schools in Sharon, Massachusetts. He graduated from the Morristown School (now Morristown-Beard School) in Morristown, New Jersey, in 1910. Plummer then received his bachelor's degree from Harvard University in Cambridge, Massachusetts, in 1914. He briefly worked for Northwestern Mutual Life Insurance Company before enlisting with Battery A of the 101st Field Artillery Regiment in Massachusetts of the American Expeditionary Forces.

== Military service and recognition ==
On August 11, 1918, Plummer helped drive off more than a dozen biplanes of the German Air Force before five German airplanes shot down his plane near Fismes. These actions helped Plummer's squadron capture 30 critical photographs of German enforcements and earned him the Distinguished Service Cross, the American military's second highest honor. General John J. Pershing awarded Plummer the medal in the name of President Woodrow Wilson in October 1918. In an earlier mission, Plummer received France's Croix de Guerre for defending aviators from his squadron despite receiving 30 bullets in his own airplane. He also received a medal from the Aero Club of America that recognized his aviation achievements.

Plummer and his pilot received burial on a knoll overlooking a valley in Chierry, France. The grave carries a marking of a propeller blade, customary for many aviators killed in World War I. Honoring his son and brother, Henry Plummer named a bridge in Dartmouth, Massachusetts the Plummer Memorial Bridge. Spanning the Little River, the bridge connects Little River Road with Potomska Road.

== Social activities and polo ==
Plummer joined Delta Kappa Epsilon, a fraternity, during his days at Harvard, and he played polo. The book Polo in the United States: A History identified Plummer as one of two notable polo players killed in action during World War I: "American polo players were also killed in the conflict, most notably Maj. Augustus Peabody Gardner, a polo player from Myopia Hunt Club, and Charles W. Plummer, 88th Aero Squad, a Harvard graduate shot down in his plane over the Vesle River in August 1918." After Plummer's death, James F. Clark, a former 101st captain, gave a cup in his honor to Boston's Indoor Polo League. (Clark was a starter for a local polo team.) The winner of the league's annual championship received the Plummer Memorial Cup as its prize.
