= Francis More =

16th-century English politician

Francis More (by 1525 – 1575?) was an English politician. He was a member (MP) of the parliament of England for Newcastle-under-Lyme in April 1554.
