= Ferme des Grèves Aerodrome =

Ferme des Greves Aerodrome
- Part of American Expeditionary Forces (AEF)
- Located near: Château-Thierry, France
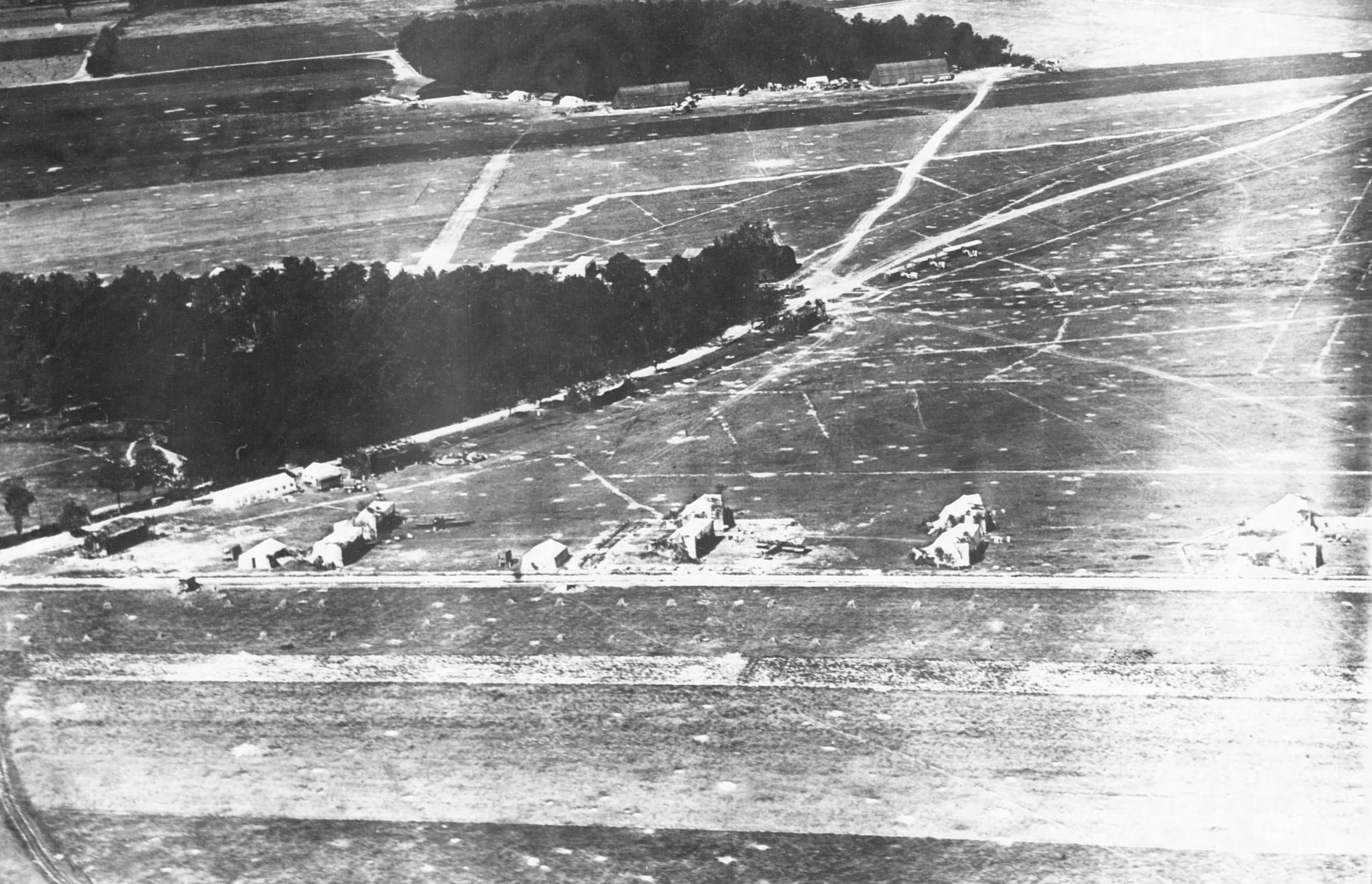
- Oblique photo of Ferme des Greves Aerodrome, taken by the 88th Aero Squadron

Site information
- Type: Combat Airfield
- Controlled by: Air Service, United States Army
- Condition: Agricultural area

Location
- Coordinates: 49°01′11″N 003°29′25″E

Site history
- Built: 1918
- In use: 1918–1919
- Battles/wars: World War I

Garrison information
- Garrison: III Corps Observation Group; United States First Army Air Service

Ferme des Greves Aerodrome was a temporary World War I airfield in France. It was located 4.3 miles (6.9 km) ESE of Château-Thierry, in the Aisne department in Picardy in north-eastern France.

== Overview ==
During the River Vesle Offensive in early August, 1918, the 88th Aero Squadron assigned to the III Corps, United States First Army for observation duties was stationed on the Ferme des Greves Aerodrome 5 August to 4 September, then 9 - 12 September; the airfield was located on the heights overlooking the left bank of the Marne River, about 10 kilometers east from Chateau-Thierry; it has been used by the French Aéronautique Militaire since May. The front lines were roughly 30 kilometers distant. Preparation had been made for reception of the group by the technical services of the French 6th Army. Hangar accommodations, for the most part of the individual tent type. Huts and billets provided ample shelter for the various headquarters and for the commissioned and enlisted personnel. The airdrome had no defenses against air raids other than the regional antiaircraft artillery. Shelter from bombs existed in the form of abandoned trenches and dugouts constructed by the troops which had recently fought over the ground.

The United States Army III Corps was organized for attack with two divisions in the line and one in reserve. The usual complement of artillery supported the forward divisions. In addition, the corps possessed a powerful concentration of heavy artillery, caliber 155. The mission of the corps was to seize a favorable opportunity for forcing the passages of the Vesle and to exploit success as far as the River Aisne.

In the air the friendly situation was weak. One French pursuit group was charged with patrolling the entire front of the 6th Army. The pursuit defense was inadequate. Corps on the right and left of the III Corps had three or more squadrons each, for the accomplishment of observation missions. The aerial observation units at the disposal of the III Corps were adequate. All squadrons were experienced. Opposite the front of the III Corps the enemy was strongly organized for defense along the heights to the north of the Vesle. He was strongly supported by heavy concentrations of artillery and machine guns. It was presumed that he would confine his operations to those of a purely defensive nature. No immediate aggressive action on his part was foreseen.

In the air the enemy was strong. A defense concentration of pursuit squadrons opposite this sector furnished constant patrols from daylight to dark. The personnel of these squadrons was aggressive, experienced, and determined to prevent observation of enemy activity at all costs. The enemy completely dominated the air. His observation effectives were apparently inconsiderable.

== III Corps Observation Group mission ==
The mission of the III Corps Air Service was to establish an effective surveillance of the enemy and report to corps and division all negative and positive observations of his activity, rendering certain the detection of either a retreat or an attack in preparation. In addition, to effect such photographic reconnaissance of enemy defenses opposite the front of the III Corps as the command might from time to time require. To accomplish this was the 88th Aero Squadron (Observation).

== Operations ==
During the first week in August, 1918, III Corps Air Service commenced active operations along the Vesle River. Each day's work was carefully planned by the Chief of Air Service and his assistants on the basis of the tactical situation as communicated by corps and divisional headquarters through the various channels of liaison above outlined.

At no time was an attack on a large scale projected or launched by the troops of the 6th Army. The operations partook of the nature of harassing infantry and artillery assaults upon the enemy's positions with the object of weakening his morale and wearing down his strength and resources. Frequent short advances across the river into his lines were carried out, but until the opening days of September the passage of the Vesle was not permanently affected by troops of the III Corps.

It developed upon the Corps Air Service to maintain a constant watch upon the enemy to detect any preparations for attack or retreat upon his part. To this end morning and evening reconnaissances were established as a matter of daily routine. These reconnaissances covered the entire corps sector. The divisional sectors were, as a rule, closely reconnoitered at least once daily by the divisional squadrons. Too much stress can not be laid upon the importance to the command of the negative information regarding the enemy's activity gathered by these reconnaissances. The command was at all times assured that, unless otherwise advised by the Air Service, no untoward events were impending. Plans for the completion of our own lines of defense and orders for the undertaking of any local aggressive operations could thus be issued with a relative degree of certitude that all contingencies having to do with enemy reaction had been foreseen and guarded against upon the basis of an unchanged situation.

While realizing the importance of the communication of negative information, the Air Service spared no effort to gather as much positive data as the situation permitted. The morning and evening reconnaissances were particularly effective in locating in the half light the flashes of enemy batteries in action. No source was more fertile than the Air Service in information regarding the situation of hostile batteries. A ruse, developed in the 88th Squadron, for trapping enemy guns into exposing their locations is worth noting. The airplane seeking to locate batteries first flew boldly up to the lines and remained at close range for some little time, preserving an altitude of about 700 meters. If, as was usually the case, the enemy guns ceased fire in presence of hostile observation, and no battery flashes were observed, the airplane retreated some 10 kilometers into its own territory and dropped to an altitude of, roughly, 200 meters. After an interval it returned at this altitude to the lines. It was rare that the observer, under these conditions, failed to pick out two, three, or more batteries which had resumed fire upon noting the absence of observation.

Vertical aerial photographs secured by the group were a valuable source of positive information. During the six weeks spent by III Corps group on the Vesle the entire sector opposite the corps front was photographed to a depth of 12 kilometers. This work was accomplished by formations of three or five airplanes. Numerous missions failed because of the active resistance of enemy pursuit, which attacked in vastly superior numbers. The average altitude was 3,000 meters. Upon one or two occasions close pursuit protection was secured from the neighboring French pursuit group 22. Ordinarily, pursuit protection was not available owing to the insufficient effectiveness of group 22, which was responsible alone for the protection of the entire Army front. It was found also that the delays encountered in meeting protecting airplanes were responsible for the failure of missions which started during perfect weather and ran into fog or clouds before the protection could be obtained and the lines reached.

A complete assemblage of oblique views of the Vesle front was secured. These photographs, remarkable for their clearness and sharpness of detail, were taken by the group photographic officer, using a 50-centimeter camera mounted on a support of his own devising which was fixed to the observer's machine-gun turret. They were of great tactical interest in familiarizing the staff and commanders of combatant units with the features of the enemy terrain immediately opposite the corps front.

In view of the expected enemy retreat, to be followed by a corresponding advance of the III Corps units and headquarters, preparations were made for the forward movement of the III Corps Air Service. The forward movement was dictated by the necessity for close liaison. An airdrome was selected at Goussancourt and hangar accommodations for one squadron assured by the technical services of the 6th French Army. It was planned to station the 88th Aero Squadron at Goussancourt immediately upon completion of the field, leaving the two French squadrons of the group temporarily at the Ferme des Greves.

== Post United States use ==
The 88th Aero Squadron was the only American the Air Service squadron to ever use the airfield, which was used by the French air units until November 1918. After the armistice, the airfield was returned to agricultural use; it was located to the NE of the Ferme des Grèves, above the village of Saint-Eugène, with no indications of its wartime use.

== Known units assigned ==
- 88th Aero Squadron (Observation) 4 August-4 September 1918; 9–12 September 1918

== See also ==
- List of Air Service American Expeditionary Force aerodromes in France
