= Pretz-en-Argonne =

- Commune
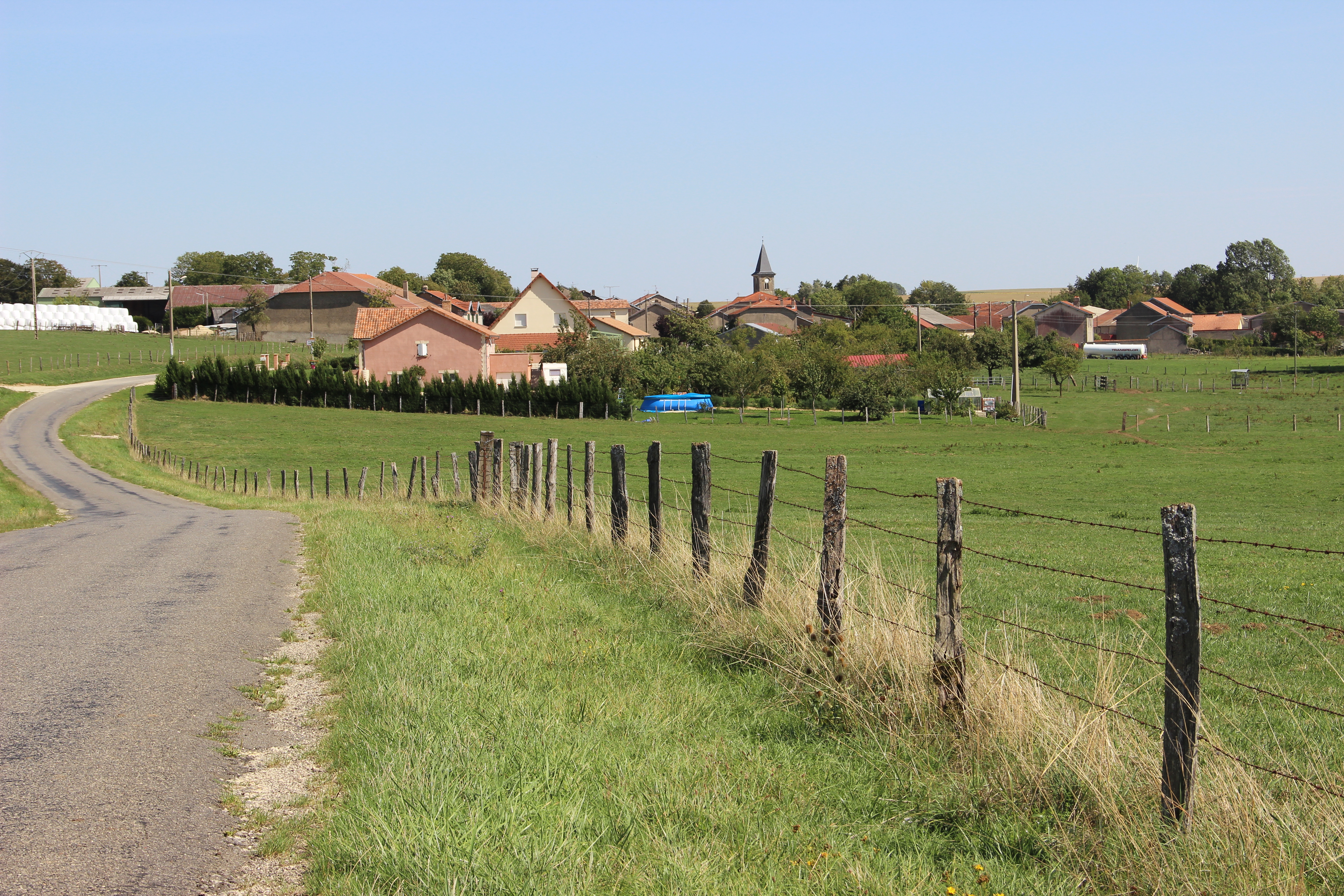
- A general view of Pretz-en-Argonne

- Coat of arms
- Location of Pretz-en-Argonne
- Location within France Location within Grand Est
- Coordinates: 48°57′27″N 5°08′51″E
- Country: France
- Region: Grand Est
- Department: Meuse
- Arrondissement: Bar-le-Duc
- Canton: Dieue-sur-Meuse
- Intercommunality: CC de l'Aire à l'Argonne

Government
  - Mayor (2020–2026): Thierry Ramand
- Area^{1}: 9.89 km^{2} (3.82 sq mi)
- Elevation: 232 m (761 ft)
- Highest elevation: 257 m (843 ft)
- Lowest elevation: 207 m (679 ft)
- Population (2023): 64
  - Density: 6.5/km^{2} (17/sq mi)
- Time zone: UTC+01:00 (CET)
  - Summer (DST): UTC+02:00 (CEST)
- INSEE/Postal code: 55409 /55250
- ^{1} French Land Register data, which excludes lakes, ponds, glaciers > 1 km^{2} (0.386 sq mi or 247 acres) and river estuaries.

Pretz-en-Argonne is a commune in the Meuse department in Grand Est in north-eastern France.

== See also ==
- Communes of the Meuse department
