= Frank Moore (horse racing) =

Australian jockey

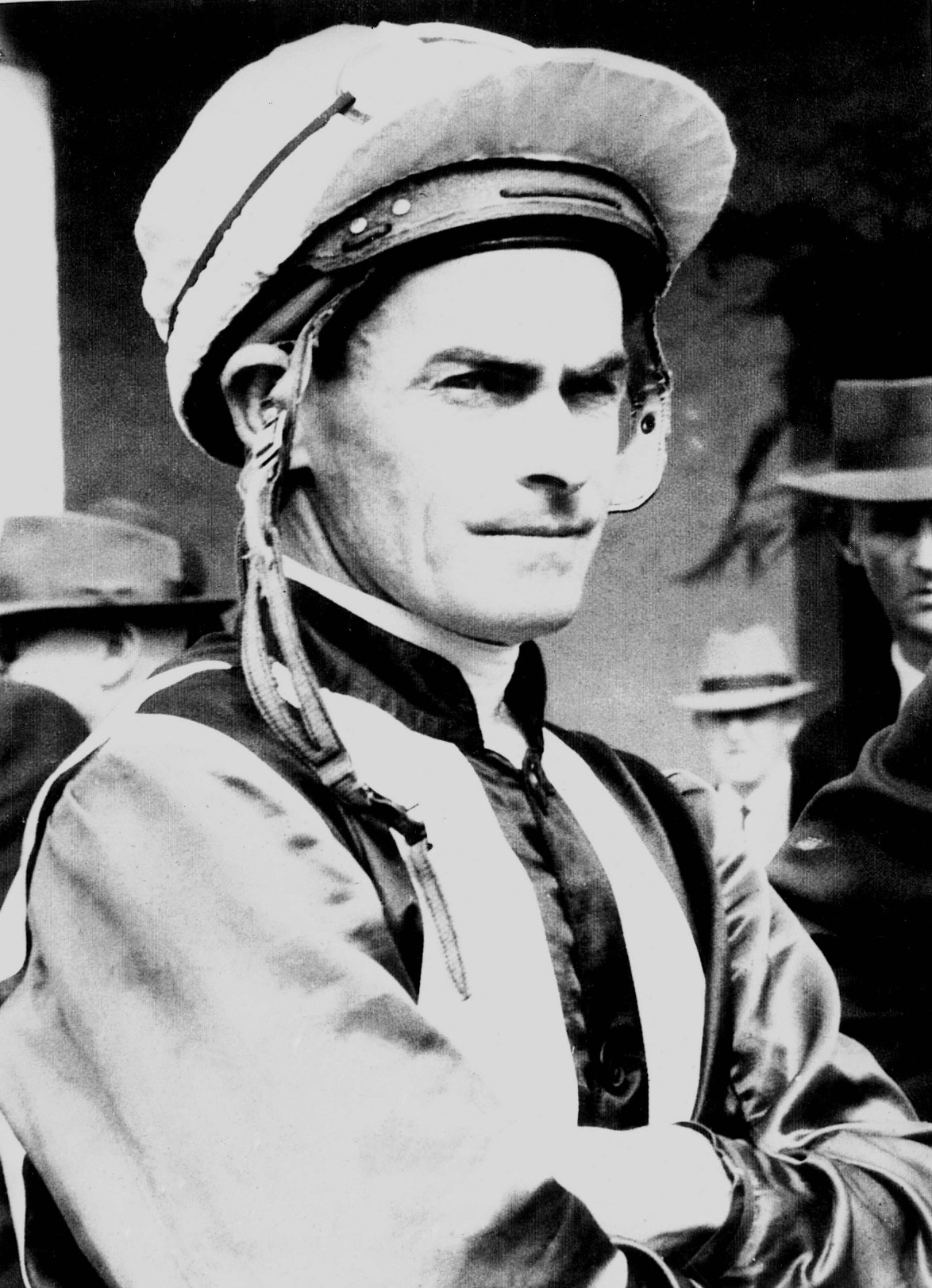

Tiger Moore was a leading jockey for four decades and achieved the rider premiership in Western Australia eight times in his career. He won the W S Cox Plate in 1962 on Aquanita.

His career commenced in the early 1940s and ended abruptly in 1975. Having over 2000 wins to his credit, he had to end his career in 1975 due to problems maintaining a low riding weight. He won seven WA Derbies and eight WA Oaks during his career.
