= 88th Aero Squadron =

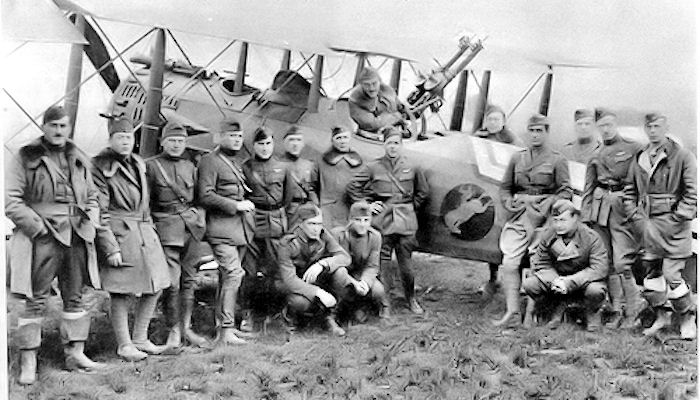
- 88th Aero Squadron members with a squadron Salmson 2A2. Taken at Bethelainville Aerodrome, France, November 1918
- Active: 18 August 1917 – 14 March 1921
- Country: United States
- Branch: Air Service, United States Army
- Type: Squadron
- Role: Corps Observation
- Part of: American Expeditionary Forces (AEF)
- Engagements: World War I Occupation of the Rhineland

Commanders
- Notable commanders: Maj. H. B. Anderson

Insignia
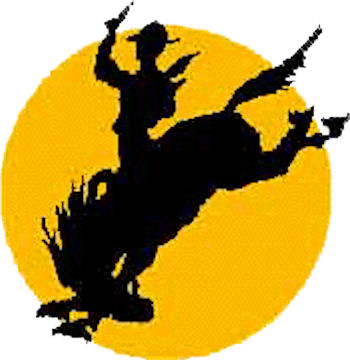
- 88th Aero Squadron Emblem

Aircraft flown
- Fighter: Sopwith 1½ Strutter, 1918
- Reconnaissance: Dorand AR 1 and 2, 1918; Salmson 2A2, 1918–1919

Service record
- Operations: as part of III Corps Observation Group; Western Front, France: 24 May-11 November 1918: Sorties: 1,028; Combat missions: 557; Enemy combats: 13; Killed: 3 pilots, 3 observers; Wounded: 1 pilot, 6 observers; Missing: 3 observers (POW); Aircraft lost: 46
- Victories: Enemy aircraft shot down: 4; Enemy balloons shot down: 0; Total enemy aircraft destroyed: 4

The 88th Aero Squadron was an Air Service, United States Army unit that fought on the Western Front during World War I.

The squadron was assigned as a Corps Observation Squadron, performing short-range, tactical reconnaissance over the III Corps, United States First Army sector of the Western Front in France, providing battlefield intelligence. After the 1918 Armistice with Germany, the squadron was assigned to the United States Third Army as part of the Occupation of the Rhineland in Germany. It returned to the United States in June 1919 and became part of the permanent United States Army Air Service in 1921, being re-designated as the 88th Squadron.

The current United States Air Force unit which holds its lineage and history is the 436th Training Squadron, assigned to the 7th Operations Group, Dyess Air Force Base, Texas.

== History ==
=== Origins ===
The 88th Aero Squadron history begins on 9 August 1917 at Fort Logan, Colorado when the men of both the 88th and 89th Aero Squadrons were inducted into the Army, received numerous vaccinations and began basic indoctrination into the military. On 16 August, the men boarded a troop train and were moved to Kelly Field No. 1, Texas. It was again moved to Kelly Field No. 2 on 24 September. After training and instruction on assembling new aircraft, the 88th Aero Squadron was ordered to move to the Aviation Concentration Center, Camp Mills, Garden City, New York on 6 October.

After several weeks at Camp Mills, awaiting transportation for overseas movement to Europe, the squadron was moved to Hoboken, New Jersey on 27 October where it boarded the British Cunard Liner RMS Orduna for the trans-Atlantic move to England. On the 27th the Orduna formed with a convoy at Halifax, Nova Scotia, arriving at Liverpool, England on 9 November. Taking a train to the south coast at Southampton, the squadron crossed the English Channel and arrived at Le Havre, France on the 11th. After some rest at Le Havre, the squadron then was boarded on a train on 13 November, eventually arriving at the 1st Air Depot, AEF, Colombey-les-Belles Airdrome on 16 November.

=== Training in France ===
Upon arrival at the camp, a billeting officer met the squadron and informed them that they would be assigned to civilian quarters in the town until the squadron could erect some wooden barracks on the station compound. On 5 December, the men had returned to their billets in the town when German Gotha bombers attacked the town, and the squadron received its first taste of war. Fortunately, no one was injured and all that was lost was some sleep.

On 1 February 1918, the 88th Squadron was classified as a Corps Observation squadron and was moved to the 1st Observation Group School at Amanty Airdrome. Here the squadron remained for over two months and was whipped into fighting condition. After a few weeks of training and also performing construction on the Airdrome, on 22d February, the squadron's pilots and observers arrived from training at Issoudun Aerodrome. Embryo observers were sent to the squadron and were trained by being taken up on various "missions", photographic, reconnaissance, liaison. etc. Pilots learned how to work with the observers and to make the plane a fighting unit. The school at Amanty was equipped with some obsolete French Dorand AR-1 aircraft, which were met with almost universal disapproval from the aviators that had trained on Nieuport 28s at Issoudun. Training at the school consisted of taking the observers up on missions over Allied-controlled territory.

In May 1918 the 88th was assigned to the I Corps Observation Group. Its mission was primarily to keep the command informed by visual and photographic reconnaissance of the general situation within and behind enemy lines. To accomplish this task, a routine schedule of operations was prescribed for each day consisting of several close-range reconnaissance missions in the sector and, toward dusk, a reconnaissance for active hostile batteries in action. Special missions were flown as required in addition to the daily routine work.

=== Combat in France ===
On 28 May 1918 the squadron moved to Ourches Aerodrome, France, and the 88th was re-equipped with English Sopwith 1½ Strutter two-seater, Rhone rotary engine, 120-horsepower aircraft. The squadron was attached to the 26th Division and on 30 May started operating over the lines on the sector extending from Xivray-et-Marvoisin to Limey-Remenauville. Hero it received its first training with large bodies of troops. Its main work was reconnaissance. with photography of American battery positions and wireless exercises with the Artillery. About the middle of June the squadron took part in the defense of Xivray still in the Toul sector and here got it first glimpse of actual warfare. At Ourches, the squadron flew reconnaissance missions from daylight until dark without a break. The squadron experienced its first combat attack by German aircraft on 5 July.

==== Chateau-Thierry front ====
The effect or this preliminary work was to make the squadron a fighting unit. From then until the end or the war, its service was constant and constantly growing in importance. This continuous service began with the move of the squadron to a different sector 150 miles to the west. On 7 July it moved to Francheville Aerodrome on the Château-Thierry front, near Belleau Woods where the United States Marine Corps was on the front. The main purpose of operations undertaken was a thorough reconnaissance and surveillance of the enemy opposite the Marne Sector in order to keep the command informed of movements and dispositions.

On the 15th the last German offensive began. It was in repelling this offensive that the Third American Division east of Château-Thierry distinguished themselves. On the 18th began the counter-offensive by Marshal Foch. From now until 30 July the combat flying of the squadron was constant and severe, every pilot being on duty from daylight until dark. The work consisted of contact patrol and low reconnaissance sorties. The squadron was considerably handicapped by the Sopwith Strutters, as they were not suitable for combat operations. The aircraft having engines were second-hand when received.

On 20 July 1918 the English Sopwith airplanes was replaced with the French Salmson 2A2. The Salmsons were exceedingly effective and very satisfactory. They were equipped with wireless accessories. three machine guns and ammunition, two Very pistols, assorted star shells, and several dropping tubes. The 88th continued operations from Francheville while the American infantry advanced northward. On 25 July, the squadron was assigned to the III Corps Observation Group and moved on 4 August to Ferme des Greves Aerodrome, France. The squadron started operating on the day of its arrival, making reconnaissance missions over the Corps front and giving protection to French photographic aircraft. As the infantry was constantly on the offensive, the squadron was constantly flying infantry liaison and artillery adjustments sorties.

==== Vesle Offensive ====
Following this the 88th along with two French squadrons were organized under the 26th Division and flew in the Vesle area. The tactical staff and personnel of the 88th comprised the commanding officer, three pilots, designated as flight commanders; two observers, designated as operations and assistant operations officers; 15 additional pilots, of whom three were deputy flight commanders; and 16 additional observers. The squadron was further divided into three sections or flights of six aircraft each. Missions assigned the 88th involved: short-range visual reconnaissance, short-range photographic, adjustment of light artillery fire, and infantry contact probes.

On 4 September the unit moved temporarily to Goussancourt Airdrome, only a few miles behind the front when the American infantry began their advance across the Vesle. Here need for careful liaison and artillery adjustment flights was continual, with the squadron's service both intensive and strenuous. The squadron moved back to Ferme des Greves on the 9th after being relieved by the French. It had during the entire Vesle Offensive been serving with the III Corps under the Sixth French Army. During its time on the Vesle front, the Germans had superiority in the air and the fighting was continual and fierce.

==== St. Mihiel Offensive ====
Next the 88th moved to Souilly Aerodrome on 12 September and was attached to the V Corps Observation Group. From 12 to 17 September the 88th operated over the lines at Saint-Mihiel. The unit took part in the St. Mihiel Offensive from 10 August to 17 September. It had fourteen planes available for service and stood sixteen pilots and eleven observers ready for duty. The squadron in the St. Mihlel attack served under the 5th Observation Group attached to the 26th Division. In the first day's fighting the division reached its enemy objective and the work of the squadron from then until the end of the offensive consisted of reconnaissance work for the division. in watching and reporting upon the enemy's retreat and counter-attacks. Thus the squadron, just having experienced hard and constant fighting on the Vesle, was able to do its part on the new front to help wipe out the St. Mihiel salient. During this time the squadron conducted photographic, corps visual reconnaissance and command missions. Also, on 14 September, the squadron moved again to the Pretz-en-Argonne Airdrome.

==== Meuse-Argonne Offensive ====
Shortly after the St. Mihiel Offensive, a certain redistribution of units took place between the various corps air units in preparation for the Meuse-Argonne Offensive. The squadron beginning on 17 September, began preparatory missions to support the Argonne-Meuse operation flying from Pretz-en-Argonne. During the operation itself the squadron acted as corps squadron to the III Army Corps and moved successively to Souilly Aerodrome on 20 September and then forward to Bethelainville Aerodrome on 4 November. Its work the attack was intensive and evidently very successful as the general in command sent a field message to the 88th Squadron commander stating that he was "Very much pleased with work of the Squadron". The squadron continued combat operations in the offensive until 11 November.

=== Third Army of Occupation service ===
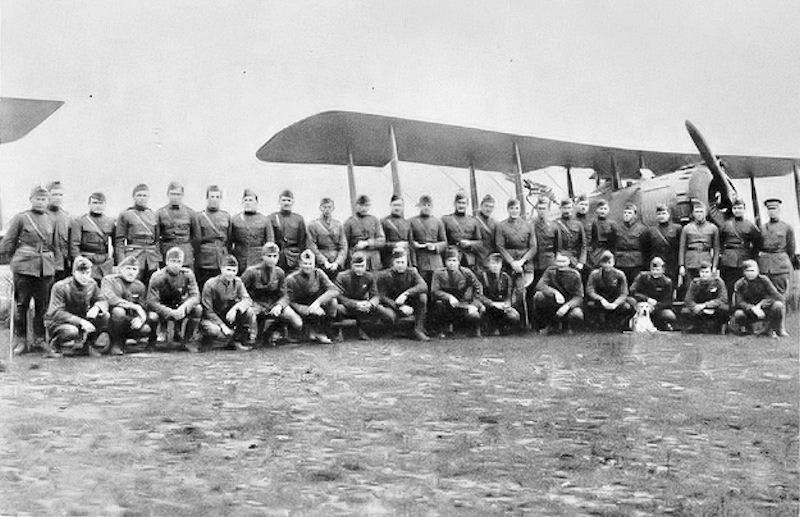
Post-Armistice photo of the 88th Aero Squadron.

For a few days after the Armistice there was a general relaxation or war activities and even the flying ceased. During November the squadron was stationed at various places. The end of the month round it at Villers-la-Chevre Aerodrome, in northern France three miles or so from Longwy. The squadron is transferred to IV Corps Observation Group (Third Army) on 15 November, then on 6 December to the VII Corps Observation Group with the same Army, as part of the occupation force of the Rhineland where the squadron celebrated Christmas. At Trier Airdrome, the squadron was able to perform test flights on surrendered German aircraft. Flights of the Fokker D.VII, Pfalz D.XII, Halberstadts and Rumpler aircraft were made and evaluations were made until May 1919.

=== Demobilization ===
On 12 May 1919, orders were received from Third Army for the 88th to demobilize. It was ordered to report to the 1st Air Depot at Colombey-les-Belles Airdrome, to turn in all of its supplies and equipment and was relieved from duty with the AEF. The squadron's Salmson aircraft were delivered to the Air Service American Air Service Acceptance Park No. 1 at Orly Aerodrome to be returned to the French. There practically all of the pilots and observers were detached from the squadron. Personnel at Colombey were subsequently assigned to the commanding general, services of supply, and ordered to report to the staging camp at Le Mans, France. There, personnel awaited scheduling to report to one of the Base Ports in France for transport to the United States.

It was ordered on 10 June to report to the port of embarkation at Brest where the squadron left France by ship on 11 June and docked in New York City on 25 June 1919.

=== Postwar activities ===
Upon its return to the United States, the 88th moved to Mitchell Field, Long Island, New York and was assigned to the 2d Wing on 27 June 1919. At Mitchell Field the unit was assigned Dayton-Wright DH-4 aircraft and moved to Scott Field Illinois on 11 July 1919. It was inactivated on 7 August 1919 at Scott Field.

Less than a month later, on 5 September 1919 the unit was reorganized at Langley Field, Virginia. Once again it was assigned to the 2d Wing which had moved to Langley from Mitchell Field, New York. On 28 October the 88th was attached to the newly arrived 1st Army Observation Group at Langley. The squadron was assigned to the 1st Army Group on 24 March 1920. While at Langley, the 88th flew the DH-4s and the Douglas O-2. On 10 February 1921, the 88th was reassigned at Langley to the Air Service Field Officers' School. Following this the squadron was re-designated the 88th Squadron on 14 March 1921.

=== Lineage ===
- Organized: 88th Aero Squadron 18 August 1917

Re-designated: 88th Aero Squadron (Corps Observation), 28 May 1918
Re-designated: 88th Aero Squadron, 27 June 1919
Re-designated: 88th Squadron 14 March 1921

=== Assignments ===
- Post Headquarters, Kelly Field, 18 August-11 October 1917
- Aviation Concentration Center, 11–27 October 1917
- American Expeditionary Forces, 9–16 November 1917
- 1st Air Depot, 16 November 1917
- 1st Observation Group School, 1 February-28 May 1918
- I Corps Observation Group, 28 May 1918
- III Corps Observation Group, 25 July 1918

Attached to V Corps Observation Group, 12–17 September 1918

- IV Corps Observation Group, 15 November 1918
- VII Corps Observation Group, c. 6 December 1918
- 1st Air Depot, 18 May 1919
- Commanding General, Services of Supply, 25 May 1919
- Post Headquarters, Mitchell Field, 27 June 1919
- Post Headquarters, Scott Field, 11 July 1919
- 2d Wing, 5 September 1919

Attached to 1st Army Observation Group, October 1919

- lst Army Observation Group (later, 7th Bomb Group), 24 March 1920 – 9 February 1921
- Air Service Field Officer's School, 10 February 1921 – 14 October 1921

School attached to 1st Provisional Air Brigade for operations, 6 May – 3 October 1921

=== Stations ===
- Kelly Field, Texas, 18 August 1917
- Aviation Concentration Center, Garden City, New York, 11 October 1917
- Port of Entry, Hoboken, New Jersey

Overseas transport: RMS Orduna, 27 October-11 November 1917

- Colombey-les-Belles Airdrome, France, 16 November 1917
- Amanty Airdrome, France, 1 February 1918
- Ourches Aerodrome, France, 28 May 1918
- Francheville Aerodrome, France, 7 July 1918
- Ferme des Greves Aerodrome, France, 4 August 1918
- Goussancourt Airdrome, France, 4 September 1918
- Ferme des Greves Aerodrome, France, 9 September 1918
- Souilly Aerodrome, France, 12 September 1918
- Pretz-en-Argonne Airdrome, France, 14 September 1918
- Souilly Aerodrome, France, 20 September 1918
- Bethelainville Aerodrome, France, 4 November 1918
- Villers-la-Chevre Aerodrome, France, 29 November 1918
- Trier Airdrome, Germany, 5 December 1919
- Le Mans, France, 1–10 June 1919
- Mitchel Field, New York, 27 June 1919
- Scott Field, Illinois, 1 July 1919

=== Combat sectors and campaigns ===
Campaigns
Streamer	Sector/Campaign	Dates
	Toul Sector	30 May-5 July 1918
	Aisne-Marne Sector	7–14 July 1918
	Champagne-Marne Defensive Campaign	15–18 July 1918
	Aisne-Marne Offensive Campaign	18–30 July 1918
	Vesle Sector	7 August-8 September 1918
	St. Mihiel Offensive Campaign	12–16 September 1918
	Meuse-Argonne Offensive Campaign	26 September-11 November 1918

=== Notable personnel ===
- Lt. Philip R. Babcock, DSC, SSC, 2 aerial victories
- Lt. Ralph B. Bagby, DSC, SSC, 1 aerial victory
- Lt. Louis G. Bernheimer, DSC (2x), SSC
- Lt. Theodore E. Boyd, DSC, SSC
- Lt. James S. D. Burns, DSC (KIA)
- Lt. Pitt F. Carl, Jr., Croix de Guerre, 1 aerial victory
- Lt. Francis B. Foster, SSC
- Lt. Sidney B. Grant, SSC
- Lt. Lewis V. Heilbrunn, SSC
- Lt. Roger W. Hitchcock, DSC (KIA)
- Lt. John W. Jordan, DSC
- Maj. Kenneth P. Littauer, DSC, SSC (2x)
- Lt. Joel H. McClendon, DSC (KIA)
- Lt. Fletcher L. McCordie, SSC
- Capt. Peter H. McNulty, SSC
- Lt. Frank M. Moore, SSC
- Lt. Joseph M. Murphy, SSC (2x)
- Capt. Richard C. M. Page, DSC, 2 aerial victories
- Lt. Joseph A. Palmer, DSC
- Lt. Charles W. Plummer, DSC (KIA)
- Lt. Leo F. Powers, SSC
- Lt. John I. Rancourt, DSC, 1 aerial victory
- Lt. John W. Signer, SSC
- Lt. Albert William Stevens
- Capt. Charles T. Trickey, SSC
- Lt. Curtis Wheeler, SSC

DSC: Distinguished Service Cross; SSC: Silver Star Citation; KIA: Killed in Action

== See also ==
- List of American aero squadrons
- Organization of the Air Service of the American Expeditionary Force
