= III Corps Observation Group =

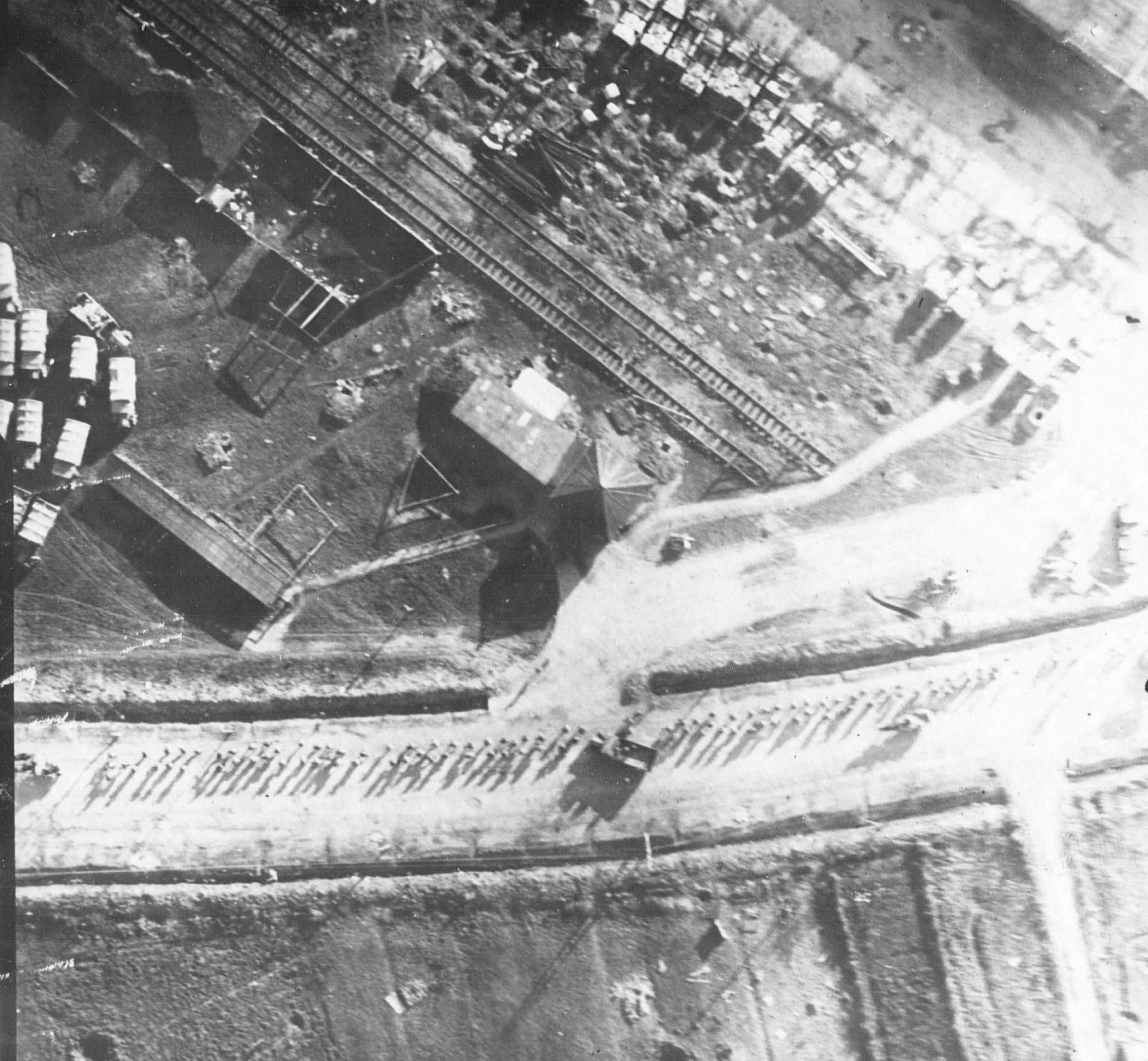
- Aerial photo of a column of American III Corps infantry passing through Dun-sur-Meuse, Lorainne, France, after 11 November 1918, taken by the 90th Aero Squadron
- Active: 20 September 1918 – 12 May 1919
- Country: United States
- Branch: United States Army Air Service
- Type: Group
- Role: Command and Control
- Part of: American Expeditionary Forces (AEF)
- Engagements: World War I: Champagne-Mame Defensive Campaign; 8t. Mihiel Offensive Campaign; Meuse-Argonne Offensive Campaign; Occupation of the Rhineland

Insignia
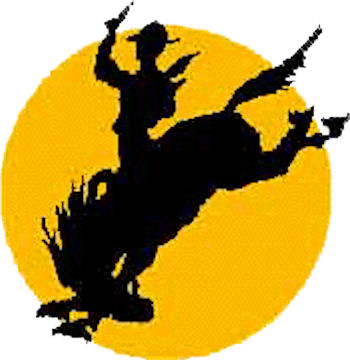
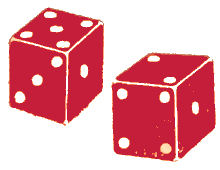
- Identification symbol: 88th Aero Squadron 90th Aero Squadron

The III Corps Observation Group was a United States Army Air Service unit that fought on the Western Front during World War I as part of the Air Service, First United States Army. It was demobilized on 12 May 1919. There is no modern United States Air Force unit that shares its lineage and history.

== History ==
=== First Army Air Service ===
The III Corps Observation Group was organized on 20 September 1918 by the First Army Air Service at Souilly Aerodrome, France. It was formed after the St. Mihiel Offensive and for the purpose of operations in the forthcoming Meuse-Argonne Offensive. Its units consisted of a Headquarters Squadron, the 90th Aero Squadron, the 88th Aero Squadron, the Aéronautique Militaire N.284 Escadrille, the N.205 Escadrille, Detachment 10/13/18, and the 199th Park Squadron for logistics and transportation support.

The first efforts of the Group were directed towards organization and preparation for combat operations in the coming offensive. To this end, the 88th and 90th were designated as Corps Observation Squadrons whose duty it would be to make artillery adjustments, to perform photographic missions of the Corps front, to make long distance reconnaissances and support the 90th and 28th French Infantry together with Divisional work. The 205th French Squadron did all Corps artillery adjustments requested. The divisions the Group for which work was done in the Meuse-Argonne Offensive were the 33d, 80th, 5th, 90th, 29th and 75th of First Army. The 88th was assigned to Corps Headquarters, the 90th for the Right and Left Divisions, with the French units being assigned to Corps Artillery and the Center division in the offensive.

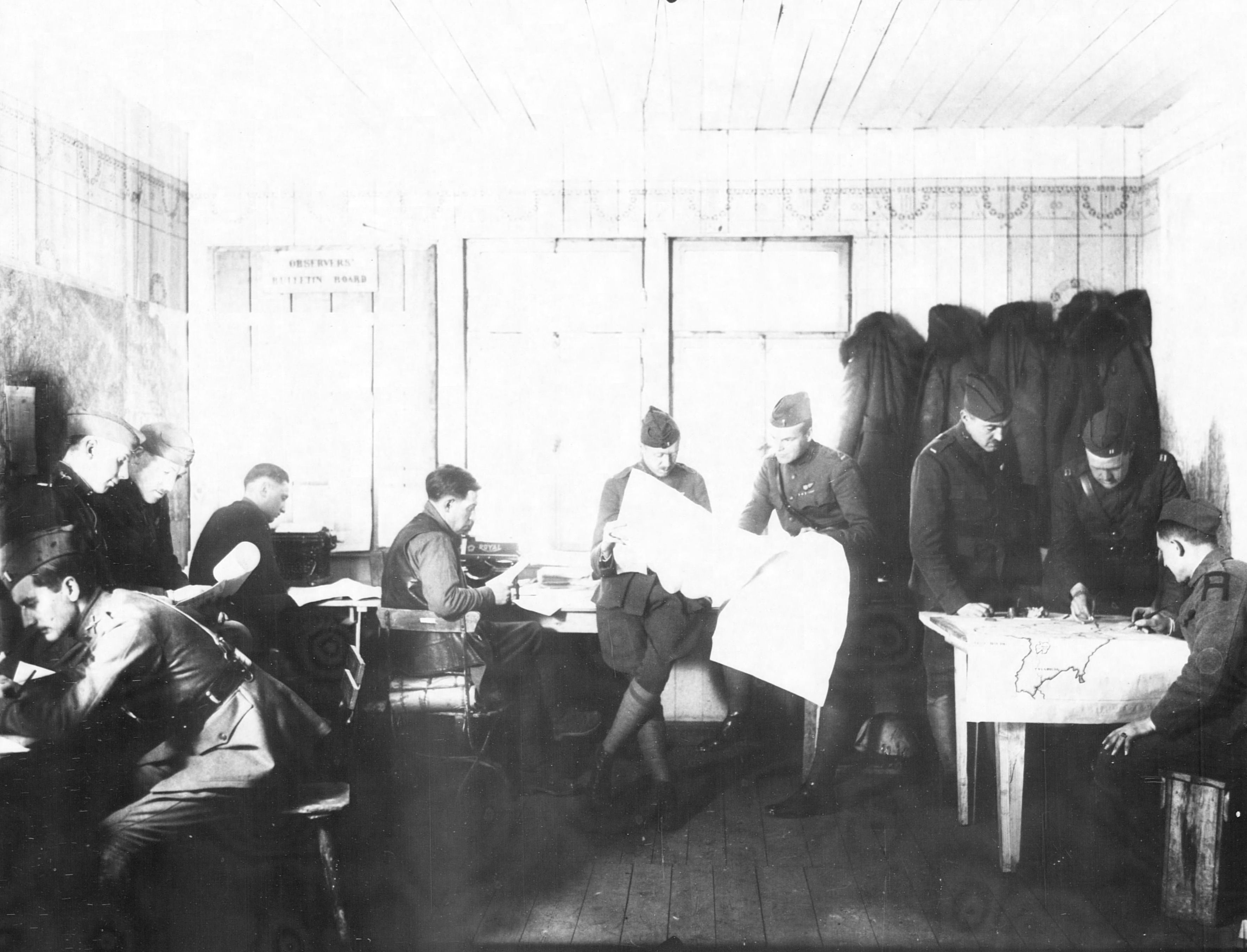
III Corps Observation Group - Staff during the Meuse-Argonne Offensive, Souilly Aerodrome, France, October 1918

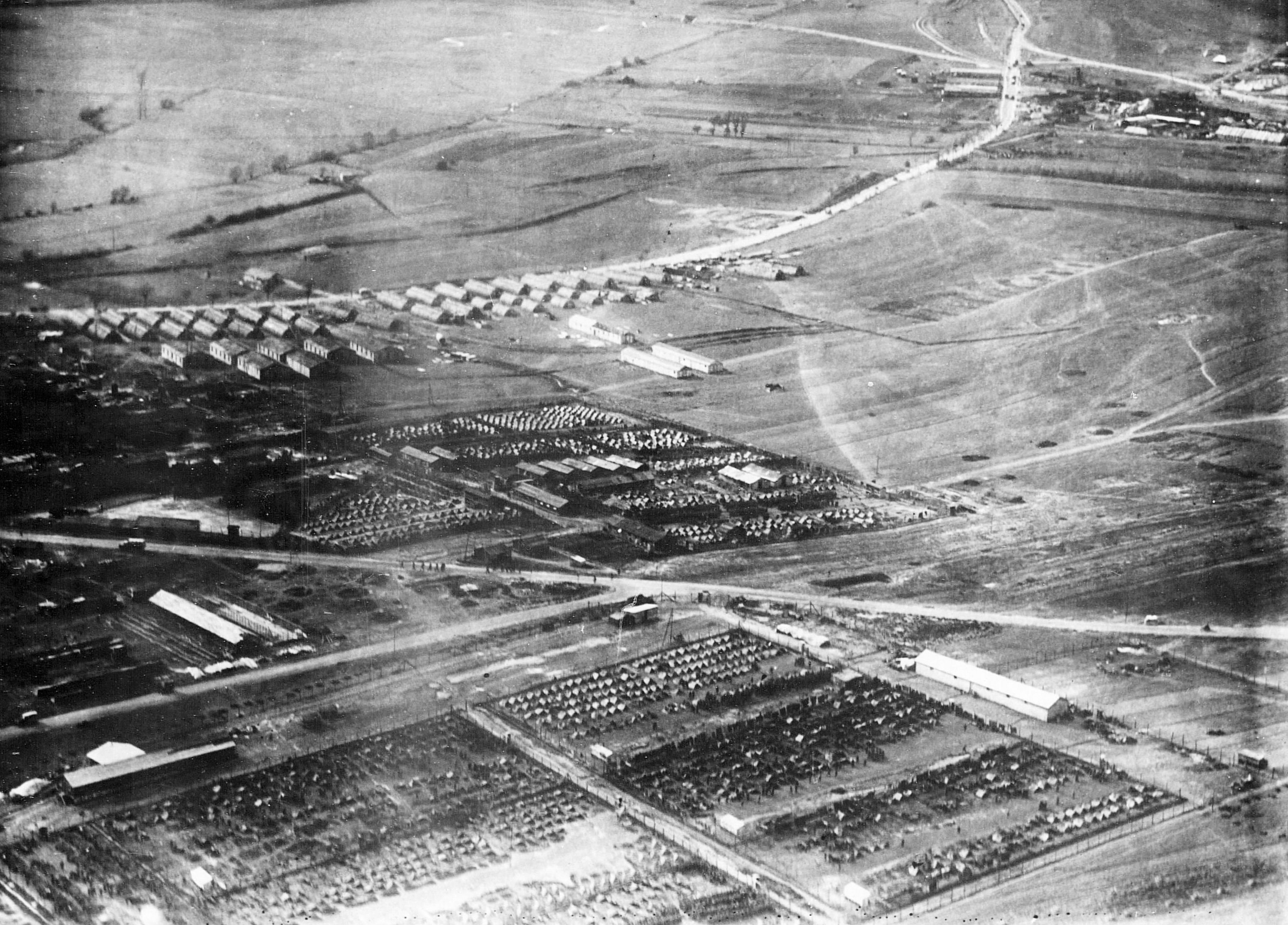
Souilly Aerodrome - France

The 88th was required to keep an airplane constantly on reconnaissance patrol from dawn to dusk each day. This plane reported to the III Corps Commander, keeping him informed by wireless messages, and weighted messages from time to time with respect to the road movement of the enemy, general aspect of the sector, information on friendly and enemy troops, artillery and machine gun activity on each side and other important information for his attention. Also, information of particular interest to divisions would be reported to them.

The mission of the 90th was to principally keep the divisional commander informed of the location of his own troops. The aircraft were also, when deemed appropriate communicate directly with Brigade Commanders, with the brigades establishing suitable message dropping locations along their line of march. The greatest attention by the Brigades were the manipulation of panels so the air service could render effective aid when called for. Also, the squadron was tasked to work with divisional artillery through squadron liaison officers.

During the Meuse-Argonne Offensive, the Group Headquarters worked night and day directing the operations, coordinating the work, and suggesting and sending out missions carried out by the squadrons, which returned with valuable and complete information. The progress of the attack was followed the line taken at intervals during each day of the attack.

In the first phase of the Offensive, in the Argonne-Meuse sector took place at Souilly, beginning the night of 26 October and continuing until 29 October when Headquarters and the squadrons moved to Bethelainville Aerodrome. The Group was well equipped at the beginning of operations with excellent and capable Salmson 2A2 aircraft and outstanding personnel. Many of the planes were damaged during the attack due to enemy fire and the engines were constantly overworked. Towards the end of the offensive, the activity and aggressiveness of enemy aviation increased. A squadron with the planes painted red came into the sector on 15 October. This squadron was most aggressive and was said to be Richtofen's "Old Circus".

While engaged in combat operations, the Group also operated Infantry liaison schools without interference with work over the lines while at Souilly. Two infantry different detachments of 500 men, with about 50 non-commissioned officers and thirty-two commissioned officers came to the airfield, and were given a 5-day course in work with airplanes.

The III Corps Observation Group continued operations at Bethelainville until 11 November, at which time hostilities were suspended The Group had 53 days of combat operations, with a total of 1,146 sorties and a total of 1,111 combat hours and 3 minutes. The 90th Aero Squadron shot down 7 enemy aircraft and the 88th three. Twenty-five successful artillery adjustments were made by the observations performed by the group. Also Thousands of sheets of leaflets were dropped on enemy forces.

=== Third Army Air Service ===
During the weeks following the signing of the Armistice, the III Corps Observation Group would be the advance corps in the Third Army's march to the Rhine River and the Occupation of the Rhineland. The Group was re-organized, being relieved from First Army and transferred to the Third Army Air Service on 21 November 1918. The 88th Squadron which had been active in combat during the Meuse-Argonne Offensive was relieved and transferred to the Third Army VII Corps Observation Group. The 90th was transferred to the I Corps Observation Group, and remained in France for demobilization, along with a number of Headquarters personnel.

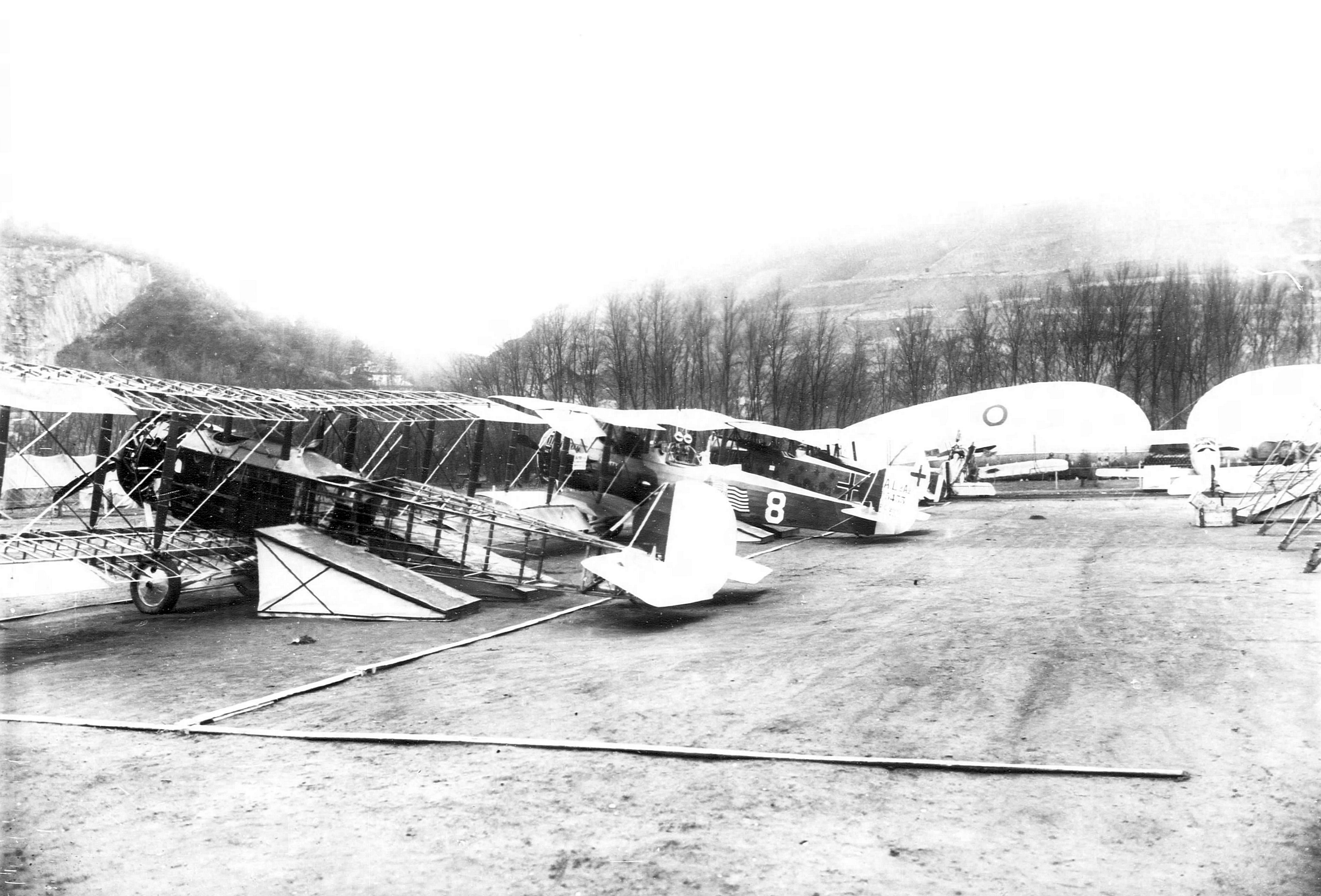
1st Aero Squadron Salmson 2A2 aircraft on display at the Coblenz Air Show, 23–27 April 1919

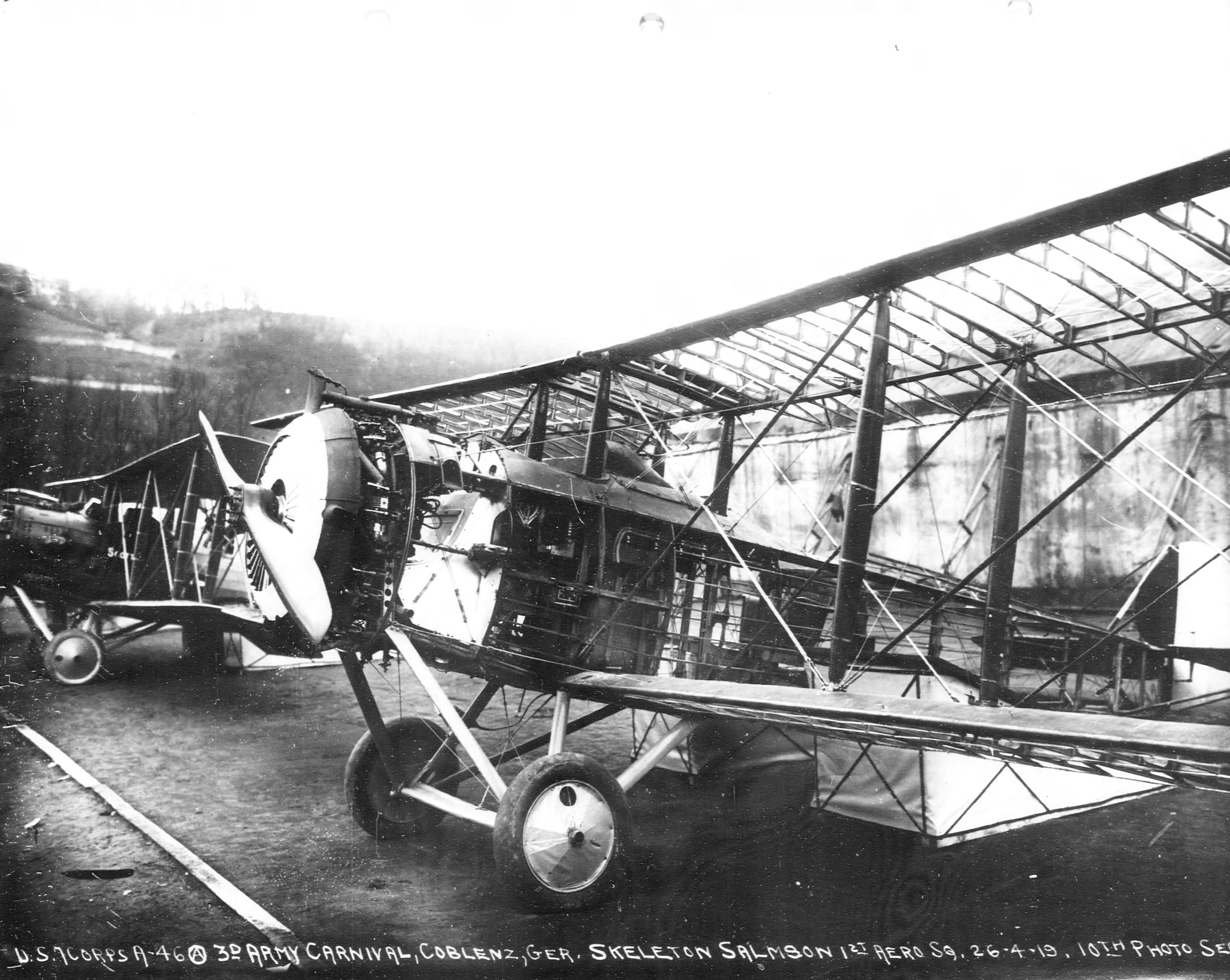
Salmson observation plane of the 1st Aero Squadron stripped of its canvas showing its methods of construction at the Coblenz Air Show

The 1st Aero Squadron, the senior squadron in the American Air Service, was assigned to the Group for its operations with Third Army on the Rhine. Corps Air Service Headquarters was moved along with III Corps to the Rhine beginning on 11 November. It crossed from France into Luxembourg on 21 November, and into the German Rhineland on 1 December. It arrived at its assigned station, the former Deutsche Luftstreitkräfte (German Air Force) Weißenthurm Airdrome, on 21 December 1918.

During its period on the Rhine, the Group participated in all maneuvers of Divisions in the III Corps, and a school for infantry and artillery liaison was established. An extensive training program was organized in Aerial photography, infantry liaison, artillery adjustments, machine guns, infantry drill regulations, map reading and the study of photographs, lectures on the cooperation of aviation with the other branches of the Army. Practice flights included long-distance cross country, photographic missions, formation flying and also, the flying of German aircraft obtained and evaluation of their capabilities and other aspects of their construction.

On 15 April 1919, four additional squadrons were assigned to the Group from the demobilized First and Second Air services in France. These were the 24th, 168th and 256th. With these additional units, the aerodrome at Weißenthurm was expanded. Also plans were made by Third Army AS to place a main Supply Depot adjacent to the airfield at Weißenthurm.

Between 23 and 27 April, the Group participated in the Third Army Horse-Motor and Aviation Show at Coblenz. The 1st Aero Squadron placed a Salmson 2A2 observation plane on display equipped for duty over the lines as well as an airplane stripped of its canvas showing its methods of construction. The 1st also won the Airplane photographic race competition, in which in 31 minutes the squadron took areal photos of a specified area and dropped developed and printed photos. The flight time from Coblenz to Weißenthurm was 31 minutes. The 1st also won honors in a message dropping contest, making a ground drop of written observation from an aircraft at 500m altitude 10 yards from a panel. It also displayed its Radio Section which showed the methods of liaison from ground to air and air to ground employed by the Air Service during the War.

On 12 May 1919 orders were received from Third Army for all squadrons of the Group to report to the Services of Supply 1st Air Depot, at Colombey-les-Belles Airdrome to demobilize for immediate return to the United States. Personnel were subsequently assigned to the Commanding General, Services of Supply and ordered to report to a staging camp in France. There, personnel awaited scheduling to report to one of the Base Ports in France for transport to the United States and subsequent demobilization. The men of the III Corps Observation Group arrived in New York Harbor in mid July 1919. There most of the men were demobilized and returned to civilian life.

=== Lineage ===
- Organized in France as: III Corps Observation Group, 20 September 1918

Demobilized on 12 May 1919.

=== Assignments ===
- First Army Air Service, 20 September 1918
- Third Army Air Service, 21 November 1918 – 12 May 1919

=== Components ===
- 88th Aero Squadron (Corps Observation), 20 September-15 November 1918
- 90th Aero Squadron (Corps Observation), 20 September-15 November 1918
- N.284 & N.205 Escadrille, Aéronautique Militaire, 20 September-11 November 1918
- 1st Aero Squadron (Corps Observation), 18 November 1918 – 12 May 1919
- 24th Aero Squadron (Corps Observation), 15 April 1919 – 12 May 1919
- 168th Aero Squadron (Corps Observation), 15 April 1919 – 12 May 1919
- 258th Aero Squadron (Corps Observation), 15 April 1919 – 12 May 1919

=== Stations ===
- Souilly Aerodrome, France, 20 September 1918
- Bethelainville Aerodrome, France, 29 October-11 November 1918
- Weißenthurm Airdrome**, Germany, 21 December 1918 – 12 May 1919

** Intermediate locations of Group headquarters while in transit from France to Germany were: Dun-sur-Meuse (11–17 November); Longuyon (18–19 November) and Longwy (20 November) in France; Mamer (21 November); Junglinster (22–30 November), and Echternach (1–2 December) in Luxembourg; Kyllburg (3–6 December); Daun (7–9 December); Polch (10–14 December), and Neuwied (15–21 December) in Germany.

== See also ==
- Organization of the Air Service of the American Expeditionary Force
