= List of Air Service American Expeditionary Force aerodromes in France =

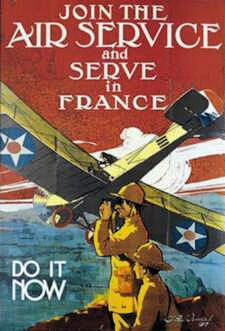
Air Service recruiting poster, 1917–1918

see also: Organization of the Air Service of the American Expeditionary Force

When the United States entered World War I on 6 April 1917, the Air Service of the United States Army existed only as a branch of the Signal Corps, and was known by the name of Aviation Section, U.S. Signal Corps. It consisted of 1,120 personnel, of which 65 were officers. The Army was not ready for the deployment of aviation forces to Europe, and it became necessary to prepare after President Woodrow Wilson's declaration of war.

== Overview ==
Aerial Gunnery and Armament School Newspaper Saint-Jean-de-Monts The Fly Paper - 18 November 1918

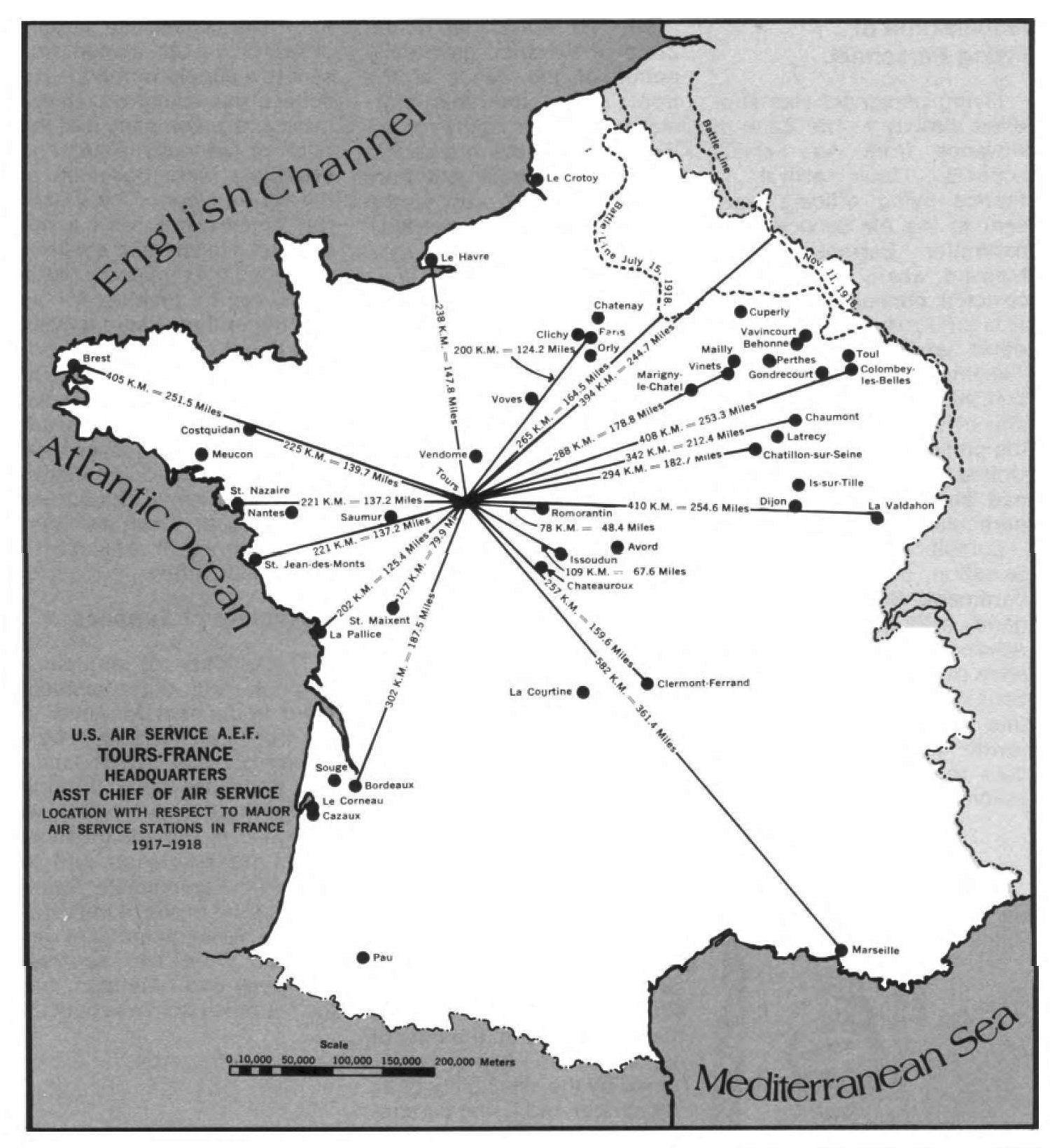
Locations of major Air Service, United States Army stations in France, 1918

As part of the buildup of US forces, aviation units were formed into aero squadrons primarily at Kelly Field, San Antonio, Texas, with additional units being formed at Rockwell Field, San Diego, California. Once formed, and prior to their deployment to Europe, Camp Taliaferro, north of Fort Worth, Texas, and several airfields near Toronto, Ontario, Canada were used by the British Royal Flying Corps (RFC) to perform flight training for the new aero squadrons. Camp Hancock, near Augusta, Georgia, was used for training service squadrons of aircraft mechanics as well as flight training.

When ordered to deploy, units departed though Garden City, New York, which was the primary port of embarkment. Units there were loaded onto transport ships for the trans-Atlantic crossing. Upon arrival in Europe, Liverpool, England, and Brest, France, were the primary ports of disembarkation, although other ports were also used. Some aero squadrons arriving in England received additional training from the Royal Flying Corps, and later the Royal Air Force (RAF) once it was established, and were then attached to British squadrons, deploying with them to France. Others received further training and were sent to Winchester, Hampshire, where they awaited their cross-channel transfer to France, using the port of Southampton.

After deployment to France, Air Service Replacement Concentration Barracks in St. Maixent was the primary reception center for new aero squadrons assigned to the American Expeditionary Force (AEF). There, units were classified as pursuit, bombardment or as observation units. Once processed, units were sent to one of several Air Instructional Centers (AIC) where they received additional training, then/or to the First Corps Observation Group School on Amanty Aerodrome or to the First Pursuit Organization and Training Center on Villeneuve-les-Vertus Aerodrome.

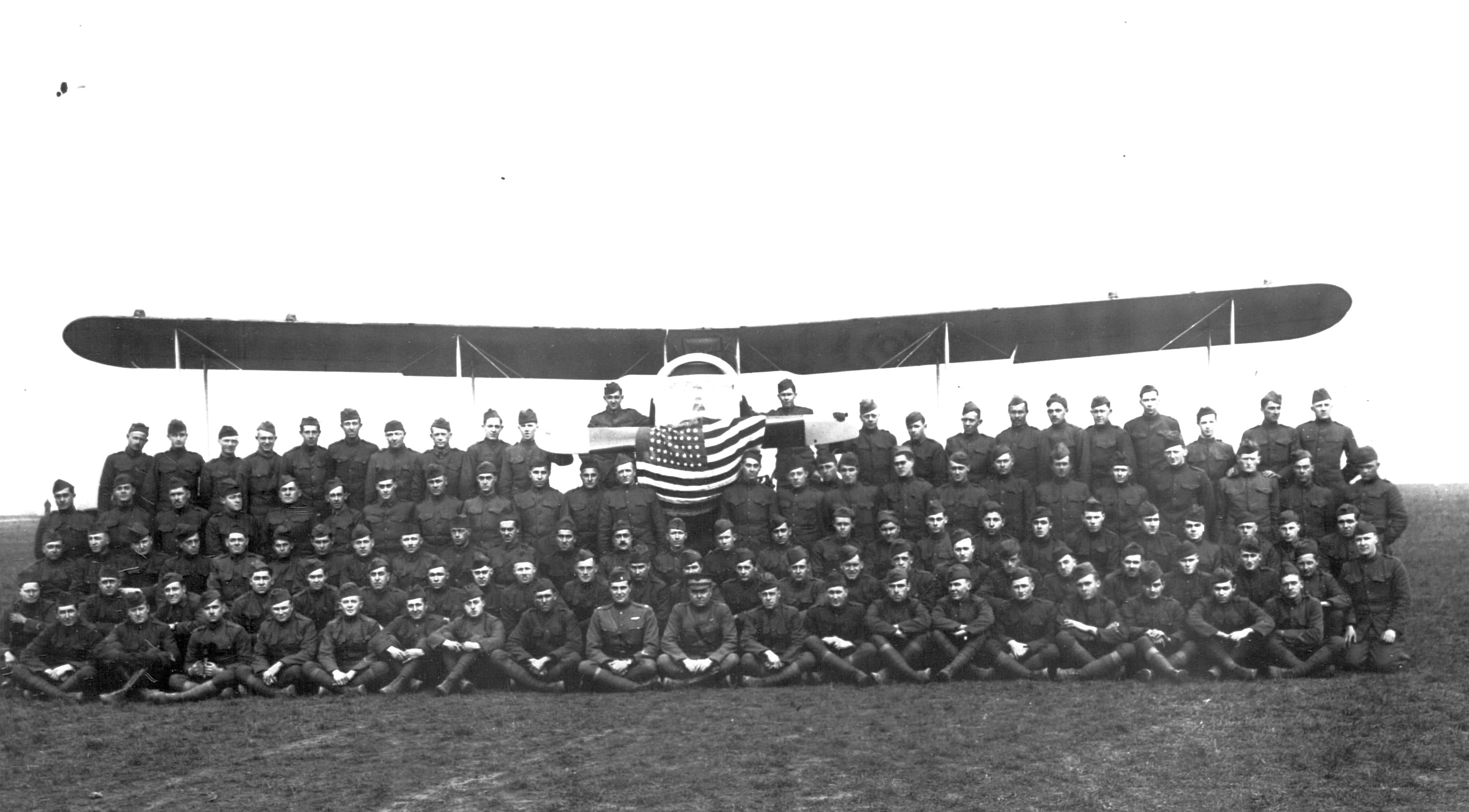
8th Aero Squadron (Observation), Saizerais Aerodrome, France, 11 November 1918

After assignment, the Air Service's deployed units operated from grass aerodromes, at first using airfields already built by the French "Aéronautique Militaire", then from new aerodromes purposely built for the American forces. The exact location of many of these aerodromes is no longer certain as many archives have since disappeared, and as the facilities were only temporary, most of the traces have long vanished through ploughing.

After the Armistice came into effect in November 1918, the wartime Air Service was demobilized. This process was completed within a year and the National Defense Act of 1920 then established the United States Army Air Service on a permanent basis, with several new units being formed. Later, some of the temporary wartime units were consolidated to retain the lineage and honors of their wartime service with the AEF.

== Stations ==
Below is a list of the barracks and aerodromes used by the American Expeditionary Force that were sent to France during World War I. Most of the headquarters and command services used barracks or requisitioned properties not linked with flying grounds, yet some were installed on airfields as in Souilly, Saizerais or in Toul, where the "Gengoult" barracks had been built by the French "Aeronautique Militaire" on the northern edge of the Croix de Metz airfields (misspelt for "Gengault").

=== American sector ===
==== Command and control ====
- Headquarters, Air Service, AEF, Chaumont, Champagne-Ardenne
- First Army Air Service

Organized at: La Ferté-sous-Jouarre, Île-de-France, 10 August 1918
Moved to: Ligny-en-Barrois, Lorraine, 25 August 1918
Moved to: Souilly, Lorraine, 21 September – 11 November 1918

- Second Army Air Service

Organized at: Toul, Lorraine, 12 October – 11 November 1918

- Third Army Air Service

Organized at: Ligny-en-Barrois, Lorraine, 14 November 1918
Moved to: Longuyon, Lorraine, 22 November 1918
Moved to Germany.

- I Corps, Air Service, First Army

Organized at: Neufchâteau, Lorraine, 10 February 1918
Moved to: La Ferté-sous-Jouarre, Île-de-France, 1 July 1918
Moved to: Coincy, Picardy, 10 August 1918
Moved to: Toul, Lorraine, 16 August 1918
Moved to: Saizerais, Lorraine, 2 September 1918
Moved to: Rarécourt, Lorraine, 12 September 1918
Moved to: Chéhéry, Champagne-Ardenne, 2–11 November 1918

- III Corps, Air Service, First Army

Organized at: Château-Thierry, Picardy, 2 August 1918
Moved to: Goussancourt, Picardy, 1 September 1918
Moved to: Malancourt, Lorraine, 24 October 1918
Moved to: Dun-sur-Meuse, Lorraine, 10–11 November 1918

- V Corps, Air Service, First Army

Organized at: Luxeuil-les-Bains, Franche-Comté, 7 August 1918
Moved to: Souilly, Lorraine, 7 September 1918
Moved to: Fauconcourt, Lorraine, 20 September 1918
Moved to: Ville-sur-Cousances, Lorraine, 22 September 1918
Moved to: Cheppy, Lorraine, 31 October – 11 November 1918

- VI Corps, Air Service, First Army

Located at: Saizerais, Lorraine, 23 October – 11 November 1918

==== Combat aerodromes ====
- Amanty Aerodrome 48°31′37″N 05°35′54″E

Located 0.9 miles (1.4 km) NW of Amanty, Meuse
French, then American Air Service training and operational airfield

I Corps Observation Group School
Headquarters, I Corps Observation Group, 2 February-3 May 1918
Headquarters, 1st Day Bombardment Group, 10–25 September 1918
1st Aero Squadron (training), 19 October 1917 – 4 April 1918
91st Aero Squadron (training), 14 December 1917 – 24 May 1918
88th Aero Squadron (training), 1 February – 28 May 1918
12th Aero Squadron (training, then observation), 2 February – 3 May 1918
90th Aero Squadron (training), 19 April – 13 June 1918
99th Aero Squadron (Observation School), 31 May – 1 July 1918
135th Aero Squadron (training), 19–30 July 1918
8th Aero Squadron (training), 31 July – 31 August 1918
50th Aero Squadron (training), 27 July – 4 September 1918
104th Aero Squadron (training), 1–4 August 1918
9th Aero Squadron (Night Army Observation) 28 August – 21 September 1918
96th Aero Squadron (Day Bombardment), 18 May – 23 September 1918
20th Aero Squadron (Day Bombardment), 7–23 September 1918
11th Aero Squadron (Day Bombardment), 6–24 September 1918
166th Aero Squadron (Day Bombardment), 21–25 September 1918

- Autreville Aerodrome 48°27′39″N 05°49′41″E

Located 1.9 miles (3.1 km) SSW of Autreville, Vosges
RAF operational, then American Air Service training and operational airfield

168th Aero Squadron (training) 2 Sept 1918 - 5 Oct 1918
186th Aero Squadron (training), 18 Sept 1918 – 29 Oct 1918
354th Aero Squadron (training, then Corps Observation), 30 Sept 1918 – 25 Oct 1918
278th Aero Squadron (Corps Observation), 1 Oct 1918 – 10 Nov 1918

- Badonvilliers Aerodrome 48°32′59″N 05°35′12″E

Unknown exact location, Badonvilliers, Meurthe-et-Moselle
Built by 477th Aero Sqn (Construct.) 1–22 August 1918
Apparently never used

- Belrain Aerodrome 48°51′10″N 05°18′17″E

Located 1 mile (1.6 km) SSW of Belrain, Meuse
French, then American Air Service airfield

Headquarters, 2d Pursuit Group, 23 September – 11 December 1918
13th Aero Squadron (Pursuit) 23 September – 6 November 1918
49th Aero Squadron (Pursuit) 23 September – 6 November 1918
139th Aero Squadron (Pursuit) 24 September – 7 November 1918
22d Aero Squadron (Pursuit) 22 September – 7 November 1918
104th Aero Squadron (Corps Observation) 30 November 1918 – 14 January 1919
99th Aero Squadron (Corps Observation) 31 November – 13 December 1918
90th Aero Squadron (Corps Observation) 15 – 18 January 1918

- Bethelainville Aerodrome 49°09′41″N 05°13′34″E

Located 0.1 miles (0.16 km) WNW of Béthelainville, Meuse
French and American Air Service airfield
Headquarters, III Corps Observation Group, 29 October – 11 November 1918

90th Aero Squadron (Corps Observation) 19 October – 15 January 1919
88th Aero Squadron (Corps Observation) 4–29 November 1918

- Bicqueley Aerodrome 48°37′34″N 05°54′46″E

Undetermined location near Bicqueley, Meurthe-et-Moselle
French and American Air Service operational airfield

50th Aero Squadron (Corps Observation) 8–24 September 1918

- Bonne Maison Aerodrome 49°16′34″N 003°43′09″E

Located 2.5 miles (4.0 km) ESE of Fismes, Marne
French 6th Army Air Service airfield from January 1917 (previously 5th Army)

103d Aero Squadron (Pursuit), 10 April – 2 May 1918

- Chailly-en-Brie Aerodrome 48°47′42″N 03°09′05″E

Located 1.3 miles (2.1 km) E of Chailly-en-Brie, Seine et Marne
French and American Air Service airfield
Headquarters, I Corps Observation Group, 12–22 August 1918

1st Aero Squadron (Corps Observation) 13–22 August 1918
12th Aero Squadron (Corps Observation) 12–22 August 1918

- Chaumont-Hill 402 48°06′04″N 05°12′51″E

Located 3.9 miles (6.3 km) ESE of Chaumont, Haute-Marne
Headquarters, Second Army Observation Group, 25 Oct 1918 - 4 Nov 1918
Headquarters, 1st Pursuit Wing, 24 Sept 1918 – 11 Nov 1918
Air Service HQ and operational airfield

91st Aero Squadron (ground training) 15 Nov 1917 – 14 Dec 1917
12th Aero Squadron (ground training) 16 Jan 1918 – 2 Feb 1918
85th Aero Squadron (Observation, Second Army), 30 Sept 1918 – 4 Nov 1918
99th Aero Squadron (General Duties) 13 Dec 1918 – 19 Feb 1919

- Coincy Aerodrome 49°09′30″N 003°23′54″E

Located 1.0 mile (1.6 km) W of Coincy, Aisne
French and American Air Service airfield

94th Aero Squadron (Pursuit, advanced airfield) August 1918

Headquarters, I Corps Observation Group, 10–12 August 1918

1st Aero Squadron (Corps Observation) 10–13 August 1918
12th Aero Squadron (Corps Observation) 10–12 August 1918

- Croix-de-Metz Aerodrome (Toul) 48°41′53″N 05°55′02″E

Located 1.3 miles (2.1 km) NE of Toul, Meurthe et Moselle
French and American Air Service airfield
Headquarters, 1st Pursuit Wing, 6 July 1918 – c. 24 September 1918
Headquarters, 1st Pursuit Group, 5 May 1918 – 28 June 1918
Headquarters, 2d Pursuit Group, 29 June 1918 – 23 September 1918
Headquarters, 4th Pursuit Group, 26 October 1918 – 15 April 1919
Headquarters, I Corps Observation Group, 22 August 1918 – 19 September 1918
1st Pursuit Organization and Training Center, then 1st Pursuit Group from 5 May (First Army)

94th Aero Squadron (Pursuit), 7 April 1918 – 29 June 1918
95th Aero Squadron (Pursuit), 4 May 1918 – 28 June 1918
27th Aero Squadron (Pursuit), 1 – 26 June 1918
147th Aero Squadron (Pursuit), 1 – 28 June 1918

2nd Pursuit Group (First Army, part of the 1st Pursuit Wing from 6 July)

13th Aero Squadron (Pursuit), 28 June 1918 – 23 September 1918
139th Aero Squadron (Pursuit) 30 June 1918 – 24 September 1918
103d Aero Squadron (Pursuit), 4 July 1918 – 7 August 1918
49th Aero Squadron (Pursuit), 2 August 1918 – 23 September 1918
22d Aero Squadron (Pursuit), 16 August 1918 – 22 September 1918

28th Aero Squadron (3rd Pursuit Group, First Army) 15–16 July 1918 (transfer from Orly to Vaucouleurs).
I Corps Observation Group (First Army)

1st Aero Squadron (Observ.), 22 August 1918 – 21 September 1918
12th Aero Squadron (Observ.), 22 August 1918 – 20 September 1918

IV Corps Observation Group (First Army, then Second Army from 14 October - HQ in Remicourt then Julvécourt)

8th Aero Squadron (Observ.), 29 September 1918 – 23 October 1918
135th Aero Squadron (Observ.), 30 Sept 1918 – 21 November 1918
168th Aero Squadron (Observ.), 5 October 1918 – 21 November 1918
85th Aero Squadron (Observ.), 10–24 November 1918

4th Pursuit Group

822nd Aero Squadron, then 6th Air Park Oct 1918 - April 1919

141st Aero Squadron (Pursuit), 19 October 1918 – 19 April 1919
25th Aero Squadron (Pursuit), 24 October 1918 – 15 April 1919
17th Aero Squadron (Pursuit), 4 November 1918 – 12 December 1918
148th Aero Squadron (Pursuit), 4 November 1918 – 11 December 1918

278th Aero Squadron (VII Corps Obs. Group/First Army, 14 Nov to Second Army) 14 November 1918 - 15 April 1919

- Delouze Aerodrome 48°34′18″N 05°32′03″E

Located 0.8 miles (1.3 km) NE of Deouze, Meuse
American Air Service airfield

166th Aero Squadron (Day Bomb.), 26 August – 1 September 1918; 7–12 September 1918
11th Aero Squadron (Day Bomb.), 26 August – 6 September 1918
20th Aero Squadron (Day Bomb.), 26 August – 7 September 1918
100th Aero Squadron (Day Bomb.), 26 August – 26 October 1918
163d Aero Squadron (Day Bomb.), 30 September – 1 November 1918

- Epiez Aerodrome 48°32′43″N 05°37′10″E

Located 0.9 miles (1.4 km) W of Epiez-sur-Meuse, Meuse
American, then French Air Service airfield

27th Aero Squadron (Pursuit, training) 24 April – 1 June 1918
94th Aero Squadron (Pursuit, training) 1–7 April 1918
95th Aero Squadron (Pursuit, training) 1 April – 4 May 1918
147th Aero Squadron (Pursuit, training) 22 April – 1 June 1918
104th Aero Squadron (Observation, on transit) 4–8 August 1918

- Flin Aerodrome 48°29′52″N 06°39′18″E

Undetermined location near Flin, SE of Chenevières OTAN/USAFE airfield, Meurthe-et-Moselle
American Air Service airfield
Headquarters, I Corps Observation Group, 13 – 29 June 1918

12th Aero Squadron (Observation) 13 – 29 June 1918

- Foucaucourt Aerodrome 48°59′45″N 05°07′17″E

Located 1.0 mile (1.6 km) ESE of Foucaucourt, Meuse
French and American Air Service airfield
Headquarters, V Corps Observation Group, 20 Sept 1918 – 4 Feb 1919

99th Aero Squadron (Observation), 20 Sept – 4 Nov 1918
104th Aero Squadron (Observation), 20 Sept – 4 Nov 1918

Headquarters, 3d Pursuit Group, 6 Nov 1918 – 31 Dec 1918

28th Aero Squadron (Pursuit), 6 November 1918 – 15 February 1919
93d Aero Squadron (Pursuit), 6 November – 15 December 1918
103d Aero Squadron (Pursuit), 6 November 1918 – 5 January 1919
213th Aero Squadron (Pursuit), 6 November – 29 January 1919

- Francheville Aerodrome 48°51′10″N 03°02′32″E

Located 1.9 miles (3.1 km) N of Mouroux, Seine et Marne
French and American Air Service airfield
Headquarters, I Corps Observation Group, 6–30 July 1918

1st Aero Squadron (Observation) 6–22 July 1918
12th Aero Squadron (Observation) 6–22 July 1918
88th Aero Squadron (Observation) 7 July-4 August 1918

- Gondreville-sur-Moselle Aerodrome 48°41′02″N 05°57′56″E

Located 0.7 miles (1.1 km) S of Gondreville, Meurthe et Moselle
American, then French (after Armistice) Air Service airfield
Headquarters, 1st Army Observation Group, 6–22 September 1918

91st Aero Squadron (Observation) 24 May – 21 September 1918
24th Aero Squadron, (Observation) 22 August – 22 September 1918

- Goussancourt Aerodrome 49°09′57″N 03°40′10″E

Located on the SW side of Goussancourt, Aisne.
French Air Service airfield

88th Aero Squadron (Observation) 4–9 September 1918

- Les Grèves (ferme) Aerodrome 49°01′11″N 03°29′25″E

Located 4.3 miles (6.9 km) ESE of Château-Thierry, Picardy
French Air Service airfield

88th Aero Squadron (Obs) 4 Aug – 4 Sept 1918; 9 – 12 Sept 1918

- Julvécourt Aerodrome 49°03′49″N 05°10′49″E

Located 0.4 miles (0.64 km) W of Julvécourt, Lorraine
French then American Air Service airfield.
Headquarters, I Corps Observation Group, 5 November 1918 – 15 April 1919

1st Aero Squadron (Observation) 5–21 November 1918
12th Aero Squadron (Observation) 3–21 November 1918

- La Noblette Aerodrome 49°06′57″N 04°23′27″E

Located 1.6 miles (2.6 km) SE of Mourmelon le Grand, Marne
French Air Service airfield.

103d Aero Squadron (Pursuit), 18 February – 10 April 1918

- Lay-Saint-Remy Aerodrome 48°41′09″N 05°44′55″E

Located 0.7 miles (1.1 km) WNW of Lay-Saint-Remy, Lorraine
American Air Service airfield.
Headquarters 5th Pursuit Group 15 Nov 1918 – 15 April 1919

41st Aero Squadron (Pursuit) 15 Nov 1918 – 15 April 1919
138th Aero Squadron (Pursuit), 5 Nov 1918 – 15 April 1919
638th Aero Squadron (Pursuit), 14 Nov 1918 – 15 April 1919

- Lemmes Aerodrome 49°04′11″N 05°16′19″E

Located 0.6 miles (0.97 km) N of Lemmes, Meuse
French Air Service airfield.

186th Aero Squadron, (Observation) 7–24 November 1918

- Lisle-en-Barrois Aerodrome 48°54′05″N 05°08′11″E

Located 1.0 mile (1.6 km) N of Lisle-en-Barrois, Meuse.
French then American Air Service airfield.
Headquarters, 3d Pursuit Group, 20 September – 6 November 1918

28th Aero Squadron (Pursuit), 20 September – 6 November 1918
93d Aero Squadron (Pursuit), 21 September – 5 November 1918
103d Aero Squadron (Pursuit), 20 September – 6 November 1918
213th Aero Squadron (Pursuit), 20 September – 5 November 1918

- Longuyon area 49°26′47″N 05°36′03″E

Five former German wartime airfields used by American Aero Squadrons before entering Germany in December 1918
Noërs Aerodrome located 1 mile (1.6 km) SW of Longuyon.

94th Aero Squadron (observation) 20 Nov - 31 Dec 1918

Joppécourt Aerodrome 10 miles (16 km) SE of Longuyon.

166th Aero Squadron (observation) 21 Nov - 5 Dec 1918

Mercy le Bas located 8 miles (13 km) SE of Longuyon.

1st Aero Squadron (observation) 21 Nov - 6 Dec 1918

Mercy le Haut located 11 miles (18 km) SE of Longuyon

462nd Aero Squadron (Construct.) 20 Nov - 2 Dec 1918
IV Corps Observation Group HQ 21 Nov - 4 Dec 1918
12th Aero Squadron (observation) 21 Nov - 6 Dec 1918

Preutin Aerodrome located 10 miles (16 km) SE of Longuyon

9th Aero Squadron (comm. duties) 21 Nov - 5 Dec 1918
91st Aero Squadron (observation) 21 Nov - 2 Dec 1918

- Luxeuil-les-Bains Aerodrome 47°47′26″N 06°22′21″E

Located 1.7 miles (2.7 km) SSW of Luxeuil-les-Bains, Franche-Comté
French (from 1916) and American Air Services airfield.
V Corps Infantry Liaison School

99th Aero Squadron (Observation) 1 July – 7 September 1918

Flight operated from Corcieux Aerodrome, 19–24 July 1918
Flight operated from Dogneville Aerodrome, 24 July – 26 August 1918

Headquarters, V Corps Observation Group, formation 1 – 7 Sept 1918
104th Aero Squadron (Observation for V Corps) 8 Aug – 8 Sept 1918
Now: Luxeuil Air Base (BA 116)

- Manonville Aerodrome

Located south of Thiaucourt, near Toul, it is only a possible airfield, where 85th Aero Squadron stayed 4–10 November 1918.

- Maulan Aerodrome 48°38′23″N 05°13′39″E

Located 2.5 miles (4.0 km) SSW of Maulan, Lorraine.
(French) and American Air Services airfield.
Headquarters, 1st Day Bombardment Group, 25 Sept – 17 Jan 1919

11th Aero Squadron (Day Bomb.), 24 Sept 1918 – 17 Jan 1919
20th Aero Squadron (Day Bomb.), 23 Sept 1918 – 16 Jan 1919
96th Aero Squadron (Day Bomb.), 23 Sept 1918 – 10 Jan 1919
166th Aero Squadron (Day Bomb.), 25 Sept – 22 Nov 1918

- May-en-Multien Aerodrome 49°04′25″N 03°01′39″E

Located 0.5 miles (0.80 km) south of May-en-Multien, Île-de-France, along the D 405, towards Meaux.
French and American Air Services airfield.
Headquarters, I Corps Observation Group, 5–10 August 1918

1st Aero Squadron 5–10 August 1918
12th Aero Squadron (Observation) 3–10 August 1918

- Ferme de Moras Aerodrome 48°56′32″N 03°10′19″E

Located 2 miles (3.2 km) E of La Ferté-sous-Jouarre, Île-de-France
French and (temporary) American Air Services airfield.
Headquarters, I Corps Observation Group, 30 July - 5 August 1918

1st Aero Squadron (Observation) 22 July – 5 August 1918
12th Aero Squadron (Observation) 22 July – 3 August 1918

- Ourches Aerodrome 48°39′47″N 05°41′12″E

Located 0.7 miles (1.1 km) WNW of Ourches-sur-Meuse, Lorraine
American Air Services airfield.
Headquarters, I Corps Observation Group, 1 April – 29 June 1918

1st Aero Squadron (Observation) 4 April – 29 June 1918
12th Aero Squadron (Observation) 3 May – 13 June 1918
88th Aero Squadron (Observation) 28 May – 7 July 1918

Headquarters, IV Corps Observation Group, 1 July – 29 September 1918

90th Aero Squadron (Observation) 13 June – 20 September 1918
135th Aero Squadron (Observation) 30 July – 30 September 1918
24th Aero Squadron, (Observation) 6–22 August 1918
8th Aero Squadron (Observation), 31 August – 29 September 1918

Headquarters, 2d Day Bombardment Group, 1–11 November 1918

100th Aero Squadron (Day Bombardment), 30 Oct – 11 Nov 1918
163d Aero Squadron (Day Bombardment), 1–11 Nov 1918

- Parois Aerodrome 49°08′18″N 05°07′02″E

Undetermined location near Aubréville, Lorraine
American Air Services airfield.

50th Aero Squadron (Observation) 28 Oct - 6 Nov 1918

Headquarters, V Corps Observation Group, 4–11 November 1918

99th Aero Squadron (Observation) 4–31 November 1918
104th Aero Squadron (Observation) 4–30 November 1918

- Pretz-en-Argonne Aerodrome (Bregnet Field) 48°57′23″N 05°08′49″E

Undetermined location near Pretz-en-Argonne, Lorraine
French and American Air Services airfield.

88th Aero Squadron (Observation) 14–20 September 1918

- Rembercourt Aerodrome 48°55′08″N 05°12′46″E

Located 1.6 miles (2.6 km) ENE of Rembercourt aux Pots, now part of Rembercourt-Sommaisne, Lorraine
French then American Air Services airfield.
Headquarters, 1st Pursuit Group, 1 September – 11 November 1918

27th Aero Squadron (Pursuit) 3 September – 12 December 1918
94th Aero Squadron (Pursuit) 1 September – 20 November 1918
95th Aero Squadron (Pursuit) 2 September – 11 December 1918
Flight Operated from: Verdun Aerodrome, 7 Nov 1918 – unknown
147th Aero Squadron (Pursuit) 1 September – 12 December 1918

Flight operated from: Verdun Aerodrome, 25 Sept 1918 – unknown

185th Aero Squadron, (Night Pursuit)) 7 October – 11 November 1918

- Remicourt Aerodrome 48°57′03″N 04°50′57″E

Located 1.2 miles (1.9 km) W of Remicourt, Champagne-Ardenne
French then American Air Service airfield.
Headquarters, VII Corps Observation Group, 30 Aug – 23 Nov 1918
Headquarters, I Corps Observation Group, 21 Sept – 5 Nov 1918

1st Aero Squadron (Observation) 21 September – 5 November 1918
12th Aero Squadron (Observation) 20 September – 3 November 1918
50th Aero Squadron (Observation) 24 September – 28 October 1918

- Saints Aerodrome 48°46′04″N 03°03′33″E

Located 0.7 miles (1.1 km) N of Saints, Île-de-France
French and American Air Service airfield.
Headquarters, 1st Pursuit Group, 9 July – 1 September 1918

1st Aero Squadron (Observation) 29 June – 6 July 1918
12th Aero Squadron (Observation) 29 June – 6 July 1918

Headquarters, I Corps Observation Group, 29 June – 6 July 1918

27th Aero Squadron (Pursuit) 9 July – 3 September 1918
94th Aero Squadron (Pursuit) 9 July – 1 September 1918
95th Aero Squadron (Pursuit) 9 July – 2 September 1918
147th Aero Squadron (Pursuit) 9 July – 1 September 1918

- Saizerais Aerodrome 48°47′46″N 06°01′25″E

Located 1 mile (1.6 km) SW of Saizerais, Lorraine
French then American Air Service airfield.
Headquarters, VI Corps Observation Group, 25 Oct 1918 – 15 April 1919

8th Aero Squadron (Observation), 22 Oct – 21 Nov 1918
354th Aero Squadron (Observation), 25 October – 15 April 1919

- Souilly Aerodrome 49°02′06″N 05°17′45″E

Located 0.5 miles (0.80 km) N of Souilly, Lorraine
French and American Air Service airfield
Headquarters, V Corps Observation Group, 7–20 Sept 1918

99th Aero Squadron (Observation) 7–20 September 1918
104th Aero Squadron (Observation) 8–20 September 1918

Headquarters, III Corps Observation Group, 20 Sept – 29 Oct 1918

88th Aero Squadron (Observation) 12–14 Sept 1918; 20 Sept – 4 Nov 1918
90th Aero Squadron (Observation) 20 Sept – 29 Oct 1918

13th Aero Squadron (Pursuit) 23 September – 16 December 1918
49th Aero Squadron (Pursuit) 7 November 1918 – 7 December 1919
22d Aero Squadron (Pursuit) 7 November 1918 – 29 January 1919
139th Aero Squadron (Pursuit) 7 November 1918 – late January 1919
Det. of 24th Aero Squadron (Obs), 9–18 Oct 1918, 27 Oct – 6 Nov 1918
Det. of 91st Aero Squadron (Obs), 16 Oct 1918 – Nov 1918
186th Aero Squadron (Observation), 29 Oct 1918 – 15 April 1919

- Touquin Aerodrome 48°43′43″N 02°59′17″E

Located 1.2 miles (1.9 km) WSW of Touquin, Île-de-France
French and American Air Service airfield.
Headquarters, 1st Pursuit Group, 28 June – 9 July 1918

27th Aero Squadron (Pursuit) 28 June – 9 July 1918
94th Aero Squadron (Pursuit) 30 June – 9 July 1918
95th Aero Squadron (Pursuit) 28 June – 9 July 1918
147th Aero Squadron (Pursuit) 28 June – 9 July 1918

- Vaucouleurs Aerodrome 48°37′47″N 05°38′57″E

Two airfields (French and American Air Services): first built 2.1 miles (3.4 km) NNW of Vaucouleurs, Lorraine, then second field 0.5 miles (0.80 km) west of the city, on the "Plateau de Bussy".
Headquarters, 3d Pursuit Group, 30 July – 20 September 1918

28th Aero Squadron (Pursuit), 16 July –20 September 1918
49th Aero Squadron (Pursuit), 28 July – 2 August 1918
93d Aero Squadron (Pursuit), 28 July – 24 September 1918
103d Aero Squadron (Pursuit), 7 August –20 September 1918
213th Aero Squadron (Pursuit), 26 July – 24 September 1918
139th Aero Squadron (Pursuit), 28 May – 30 June 1918

- Vavincourt Aerodrome 48°48′56″N 05°12′44″E

Located 0.6 miles (0.97 km) SSE of Vavincourt, Lorraine
American Air Service airfield and depot
Headquarters, 1st Army Observation Group, 22 September – 11 November 1918

24th Aero Squadron (Obs) 22 September 1918 – 15 April 1919
91st Aero Squadron (Obs) 21 September 1918 – 21 November 1918

Det. operated from Souilly, 9–18 Oct 1918, 27 Oct-6 Nov 1918

9th Aero Squadron (Night Observation) 21 Sept – 21 Nov 1918

- Verdun area 49°09′33″N 05°24′47″E

Allied airfields at undetermined locations around Verdun, Lorraine

Detachment of 27th Aero Squadron (Pursuit) 25 Sep – 12 Dec 1918
Detachment of 95th Aero Squadron (Pursuit) 7 -11 Nov 1918

- Villeneuve-les-Vertus Aerodrome 48°56′14″N 04°03′30″E

Located 3.4 miles (5.5 km) NE of Vertus, Champagne-Ardenne
French Air Service airfield
1st Pursuit Organization and Training Center January 1918 – 5 May 1918

94th Aero Squadron (Pursuit) 5 March – 1 April 1918
95th Aero Squadron (Pursuit) 18 February – 1 April 1918

==== Support aerodromes and depots ====
- Colombey-les-Belles Aerodrome

Headquarters, Commanding General, Services of Supply
1st Air Depot. : Two airfields: Main depot, with flying ground in its northern part 48°31′51″N 05°53′02″E, and a new airfield built in April 1918 east of Colombey: 48°31′28″N 05°54′28″E
Initial supply and equipment depot for new units. Army personnel/medical center. In charge of demobilizing American Air Service units after Armistice.
Located 0.6 miles (0.97 km) WNW of Colombey-les-Belles, Lorraine

Advance Air Depots at Behonne Aerodrome, 1 mile (1.6 km) north of Bar-le-Duc, and at Vavincourt Aerodrome, a further 2 miles (3.2 km) in the same direction.

- Courban Aerodrome and Depot 47°54′30″N 04°44′10″E,

3rd Aircraft Depot/3rd Aeroplane supply Depot (?) from May 1918 to March 1918, replaced by a French "Depot de Matérial Aéronautique No 3", in charge of demobilizing French units. The depot was built on both sides of the railway station of Courban, with surprisingly traces still visible today.

- Grand Aerodrome

Located 6.0 miles (9.7 km) west of Neufchâteau, Vosges.
Airfield: 48°22′18″N 05°27′48″E
Airfield built during summer 1918; it did not see any operational use. 258th Aero Squadron arrived on 18 November 1918, followed in early 1919 by a few other squadrons bound for demobilization at Colombey-les-Belles. All were gone by mid April, then the airfield was turned back to agriculture.

- Latrecey Depot 47°58′50″N 04°52′42″E

2d Air Depot, located 6.0 miles (9.7 km) south of the village, along the railway line. Nearing completion by the day of the Armistice, it was never fully operational.

- Orly Aerodrome and Depot, Paris 48°43′39″N 02°22′07″E

Air Service Acceptance Park No. 1
Now: Orly Airport (IATA: ORY, ICAO: LFPO)

- Ravennefontaines Depot 48°02′08″N 005°36′16″E

6th Air Depot, operational late October 1918 - June 1919.

- Romorantin Aerodrome 47°21′31″N 01°44′50″E

Air Service Production Center No. 2.
Receiving point for all Liberty DH-4 planes shipped from the United States as well as a salvage area for wrecked airplanes.
Located near Romorantin-Lanthenay, Centre

- St. Maixent Replacement Barracks 46°24′52″N 00°12′38″W

Air Service Replacement Concentration Center
Primary reception and classification center for new units assigned to AEF.
Located in Saint-Maixent-l'École, Poitou-Charentes

- Vinets Aerodrome 48°31′41″N 004°13′32″E

5th Air Depot
Undetermined location near Vinets, Champagne-Ardenne

- Châtenay sur Seine 48°25′08″N 003°05′43″E

Air Service Spare Depot

==== Training schools ====
Aviation Instruction Centers

- 1st Aviation Instructional Center (1st AIC)

Reuilly Barracks, Paris (Headquarters)
Mechanics Training School, with troops dispatched to the following factories:

Hispano-Suiza Factory
Renault Factory
Breguet Factory
Brasier Factory
Nieuport Factory
Bleriot Factory

- 2d Aviation Instructional Center (2d AIC)

Tours Aerodrome 47°25′50″N 00°43′08″E
French pilot school from October 1915, control transferred to American Air Service on 1 November 1917.
Preliminary observation, radio, photography and gunnery school
Located near: Tours, Centre
Now: Tours Val de Loire Airport

- 3d Aviation Instruction Center (3d AIC)

Issoudun Aerodrome
46°57′16″N 01°59′18″E
Advanced pursuit and observation school
Located near: Issoudun, Centre

- 4th Aviation Instruction Center (4th AIC)

Avord Aerodrome
47°03′14″N 02°37′59″E
Largest French Air Service flying school for advance training and night flying; effective operation of 4th AIC to be confirmed...
Location: 1.7 miles (2.7 km) NW of Avord, Centre
Now: Avord Air Base (BA 102)

- 5th Aviation Instruction Center (5th AIC)

Bron Aerodrome (Rhône), near Lyon, France
45°43′46″N 04°56′20″E
Mechanics training school (closed late 1917)*

- 6th Aviation Instruction Center (6th AIC)
- Numerous advance flying schools organized by French Air Service from 1915 on several airfields (one field was former Wright brothers' airfield of 1909), near Pau (Pyrenees Atlantiques), France. Effective operation of 6th AIC to be confirmed...
- 7th Aviation Instruction Center (7th AIC)

Aulnat Aerodrome, east of Clermont-Ferrand, Auvergne.
45°47′08″N 03°09′45″E
Bombardment training school with French Air Service bombardment school.
Now: Clermont-Ferrand Airport

- 8th Aviation Instruction Center (8th AIC)

Foggia Aerodrome
41°26′17″N 15°32′38″E
Foggia, Italy

* The 5th Aviation Instruction Center at Bron (now Lyon–Bron Airport) was located at the French Air Service Mechanics School. The first Americans were sent to the school in mid-September, 1917. The school was overcrowded and was lacking in proper quarters and mess facilities for the Americans. Also, a lack of English-speaking instructors led to the decision to withdraw the Americans from the school. Students were sent to the 3d AIC at Issodun, with the last departing on 4 December 1917.

Artillery Aerial Observation Schools

- 1st Artillery Aerial Observation School (1st AAOS)

47°56′43″N 002°09′00″W
Coetquidan training range near Guer, in Brittany, France

- 2d Artillery Aerial Observation School (2d AAOS)

44°49′42″N 000°42′56″W
Souge training range, near Bordeaux, France
Now: Former Army training grounds (airfield closed), northwest of Bordeaux–Mérignac Airport

- 3d Artillery Aerial Observation School (3d AAOS)

Mailly-le-Camp (Mailly training range), Aube. 48°39′21″N 004°13′46″E
Aircraft of attached 99th Aero Squadron (11 March to 31 May 1918) were stationed at Haussimont Aerodrome 48°44′05″N 04°09′10″E, 1 km south of Haussimont, Marne.

- 4th Artillery Aerial Observation School (4th AAOS)

47°45′43″N 02°46′56″W
Locmaria-Grand-Champ Aerodrome, near the Meucon training range, north of Vannes, in Brittany, France

- 5th Artillery Aerial Observation School (5th AAOS)

47°09′21″N 06°17′38″W
Le Valdahon training range, 20 km east of Besançon, France

- Artillery Officers School (Aviation Detachment)

47°11′27″N 00°03′11″W
Saint-Cyr-en-Bourg Aerodrome, on the Saumur Artillery School training grounds, south of Saumur, France
Observation School for Artillery Officers

Miscellaneous AEF Schools

- Cazaux Aviation Instruction Center

44°32′01″N 01°07′34″W
French aerial and anti-aircraft gunnery school created in 1915 on Cazaux Aerodrome, France; detachment of the American 2nd Aviation Instruction Center (Tours).
Now: Cazaux Air Base (BA 120)

- Saint-Jean-de-Monts Aerial Gunnery School

46°45′53″N 02°02′09″W
Saint-Jean-de-Monts Aerodrome, France

- I Corps Aeronautical School**

Gondrecourt-le-Château, France

- II Corps Aeronautical School

47°50′54″N 04°34′50″E
Chatillon-Sur-Seine Aerodrome, France

** The I Corps Aeronautical School was a temporary school, located at the French Air Service machine-gun training school at Gondrecourt-le-Château. About 225 men were sent to the school during March and April, 1918.

=== British sector ===
- Allonville Aerodrome 49°56′47″N 02°22′24″E

Approximate location:0.5 miles (0.80 km) NE of Allonville, Picardy

148th Aero Squadron (Pursuit),11–18 August 1918

Squadron attached to British 4th Army, operated as part of the RFC/RAF

- Auxi-le-Château Aerodrome 50°13′54″N 02°06′46″E

Undetermined location near Auxi-le-Château, Nord-Pas-de-Calais

17th Aero Squadron (Pursuit), 19 August – 20 September 1918

Detachment operated from Beugnatre Aerodrome, 10–20 September 1918
Attached to several squadrons of the British RFC

- Baizieux Aerodrome 49°27′29″N 03°16′45″E

Undetermined location near Baizieux, Picardy

148th Aero Squadron (Pursuit), 20 September –15 October 1918

Squadron attached to British 4th Army, operated as part of the RFC/RAF

- Bray-Dunes Aerodrome 51°04′15″N 02°31′29″E

Undetermined location near Bray-Dunes, Nord-Pas-de-Calais

103d Aero Squadron (Pursuit), 2–5 May 1918

- Cappelle Aerodrome 50°59′56″N 02°21′50″E

Undetermined location near Cappelle-la-Grande, Nord-Pas-de-Calais

148th Aero Squadron (Pursuit), 30 June – 22 July 1918

Squadron attached to British 3d Army, operated as part of the RFC/RAF

- Petite Synthe Aerodrome 51°01′15″N 02°20′39″E

Undetermined location near Petite-Synthe, Nord-Pas-de-Calais

17th Aero Squadron (Pursuit), 20 June – 19 August 1918

Attached to several squadrons of the British RFC

- Remaisnil Aerodrome 50°12′02″N 02°14′45″E

Undetermined location near Remaisnil, Picardy

148th Aero Squadron (Pursuit), 18 August – 20 September 1918

Squadron attached to British 4th Army, operated as part of the RFC/RAF

- Beugnâtre Aerodrome 50°07′49″N 02°52′35″E

Located 0.4 miles (0.64 km) W of Beugnâtre, Nord-Pas-de-Calais

Detachment of 17th Aero Squadron (Pursuit), 10–20 September 1918

- Crochte Aerodrome 50°56′04″N 02°23′14″E

Undetermined location near Crochte, Nord-Pas-de-Calais

103d Aero Squadron (Pursuit), 8 June – 4 July 1918

- Guinness Aerodrome 50°52′06″N 01°52′13″E

Undetermined location near Guînes, Nord-Pas-de-Calais

22d Aero Squadron (Observation) 24–26 June 1918

- Saint-Omer Aerodrome 50°45′00″N 02°15′07″E

Undetermined location near Saint-Omer, Nord-Pas-de-Calais

28th Aero Squadron (Pursuit), 24–27 June 1918

- Leffrinckoucke Aerodrome 51°03′03″N 02°26′18″E

Undetermined location near Leffrinckoucke, Nord-Pas-de-Calais

103d Aero Squadron (Pursuit), 5 May – 18 June 1918

- Sonchamp Aerodrome 48°34′34″N 01°52′35″E

Undetermined location near Sonchamp, Île-de-France

17th Aero Squadron (Pursuit), 20 September – 4 November 1918
