= Canton of Gondrecourt-le-Château =

Former canton in Meuse, France

Coordinates: 48°29′33″N 5°24′56″E

- Former canton
- Location of the canton in the arrondissement of Commercy
- Country: France
- Region: Grand Est
- Department: Meuse
- No. of communes: {{{nbcomm}}}
- Disbanded: 2014

Government
  - Representatives: Daniel Lhuillier
- Area: 341.27 km^{2} (131.77 sq mi)
- Population (2012): 4,627
  - Density: 13.56/km^{2} (35.12/sq mi)

The canton of Gondrecourt-le-Château (French: Canton de Gondrecourt-le-Château) is a former French canton located in the department of Meuse in the Lorraine region (now part of Grand Est). This canton was organized around Gondrecourt-le-Château in the arrondissement of Commercy. It is now part of the canton of Ligny-en-Barrois.

The last general councillor from this canton was Daniel Lhuillier (PS), elected in 1998.

== History ==
The canton of Gondrecourt was part of the district of Gondrecourt, created by the decree of 30 January 1790.

After the abolition of the districts in 1795, the canton became part of the arrondissement of Commercy when it was created in 1801.

In 1924, following the renaming of the main town of Gondrecourt to Gondrecourt-le-Château, the canton also changed its name to become the canton of Gondrecourt-le-Château.

Following the cantonal reorganization of 2014, the canton was abolished. All the municipalities were integrated into the canton of Ligny-en-Barrois.

== Composition ==
The canton of Gondrecourt-le-Château grouped together 19 municipalities and had 4,627 inhabitants (2012 census without double counts).

1. Abainville
2. Amanty
3. Badonvilliers-Gérauvilliers
4. Baudignécourt
5. Bonnet
6. Chassey-Beaupré
7. Dainville-Bertheléville
8. Delouze-Rosières
9. Demange-aux-Eaux
10. Gondrecourt-le-Château
11. Horville-en-Ornois
12. Houdelaincourt
13. Mauvages
14. Les Roises
15. Saint-Joire
16. Tréveray
17. Vaudeville-le-Haut
18. Vouthon-Bas
19. Vouthon-Haut
