= Coincy =

Coincy is a French surname and a place name. It may refer to:

== People ==
- Gautier de Coincy (1177–1236), French abbot, poet, and musical arranger
- Jean-Baptiste de Coincy (1709-1797), Lieutenant-General of the French Royal Armies, Commander of the Royal and Military Order of Saint Louis.
- Auguste-Henri de Coincy (1837–1903), French botanist, whose name is commemorated by the Coincya genus and the "Prix de Coincy".

== Places ==
- Coincy Aerodrome, French World War I airfield near Aisne
- Coincy, Aisne, French commune in the department of Aisne
- Coincy, Moselle, French commune in the department of Moselle
