= La Noblette Aerodrome =

Temporary airfield in France

- Part of American Expeditionary Forces (AEF)
- Located near: Mourmelon-le-Grand, France
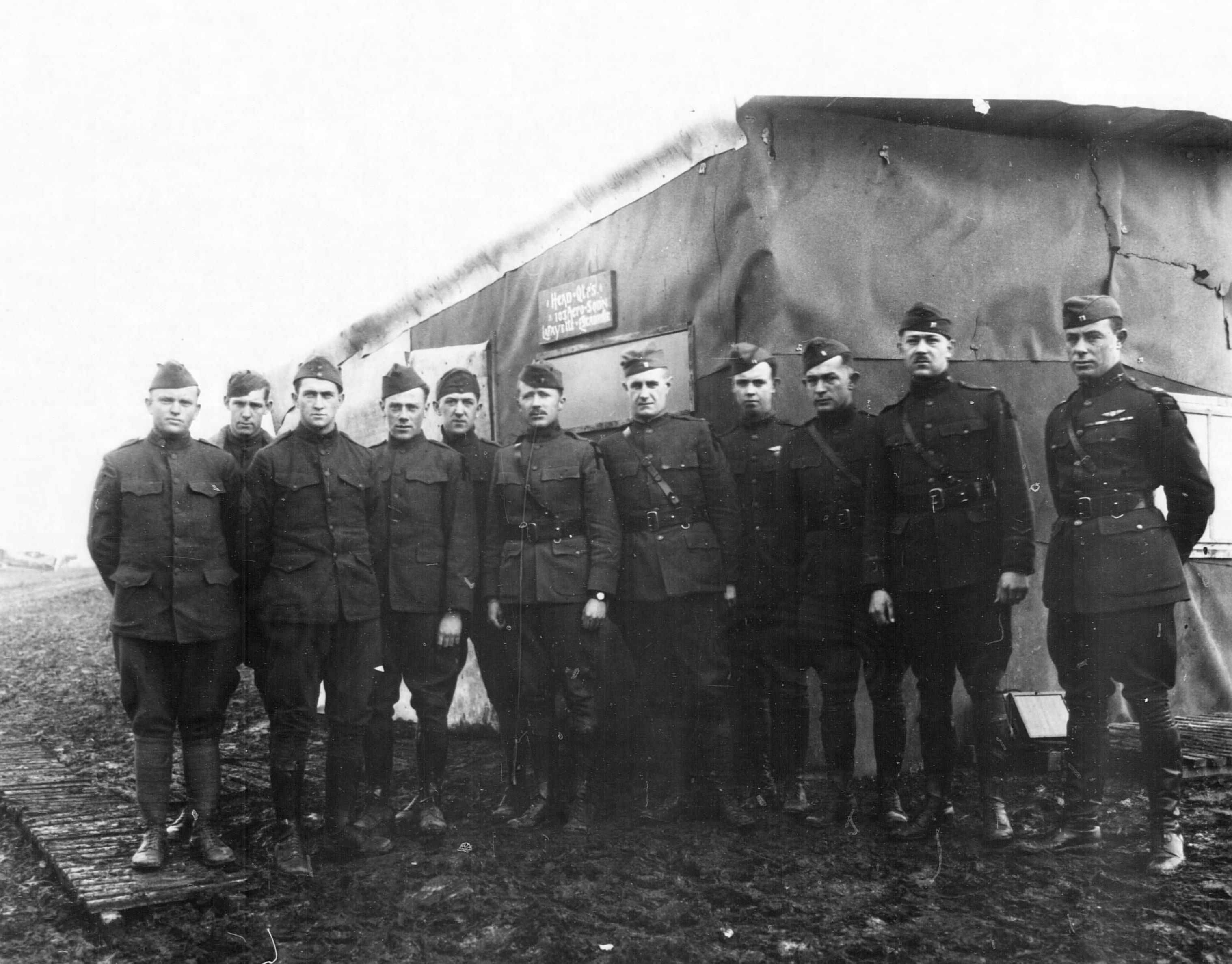
- Operations staff, 103d Aero Squadron at La Noblette Aerodrome, early 1918

Site information
- Type: Combat Airfield
- Controlled by: Air Service, United States Army
- Condition: Agricultural area

Location
- Coordinates: 49°06′57″N 004°23′27″E

Site history
- Built: 1918
- In use: 1918–1919
- Battles/wars: World War I

Garrison information
- Garrison: 3d Pursuit Group; United States First Army Air Service

La Noblette Aerodrome, was a temporary World War I airfield in France. It was located 1.6 miles (2.6 km) Southeast of the commune of Mourmelon-le-Grand, in the Marne department in north-eastern France.

== Overview ==
The airfield of La Noblette was used by the French Air Services since summer 1915, on the northeast side of the village.

At the end of 1917, the French SPA 124 escadrille which had hosted the American volunteer pilots since April 1916, was part of the "Groupe de Combat no 13", working for the French fourth army, in the Champagne area. It became "Escadrille Lafayette", while a new SPA 124 with French pilots was created, but was soon disbanded sometime in February 1918 and its pilots joined the 103rd Aero Squadron arriving at La Noblette on 13 February after its ground troops had been at Issoudun Aerodrome where they had arrived on Christmas Eve, 1917. The 103rd was incorporated in the French "Groupe de Combat no 21", still working for the French fourth army, until 10 April, when it moved further west at La Bonne Maison Aerodrome near Fismes, this time flying missions for the French sixth army.

La Noblette was used by the French Air Services until March 1919, then returned to agricultural use. Today it is a series of cultivated fields located southeast of Mourmelon-le-Grand, with no indications of its wartime use.

== See also ==
- List of Air Service American Expeditionary Force aerodromes in France
