= Mercy-le-Bas Aerodrome =

Longuyon area aerodromes
- Part of American Expeditionary Forces (AEF)
- Located near: Longuyon, France
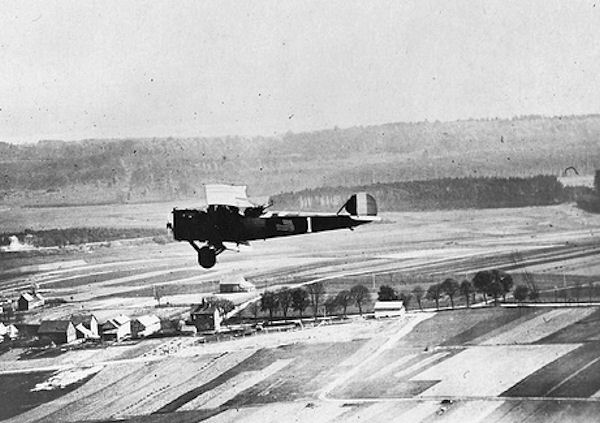
- 1st Aero Squadron – Salmson 2A2 in flight

Site information
- Type: Airfield
- Controlled by: Air Service, United States Army
- Condition: Agricultural area

Location
- Coordinates: 49°26′47″N 005°36′03″E

Site history
- Built: 1918
- In use: 1918–1919
- Battles/wars: World War I

Garrison information
- Garrison: I Corps Observation Group; United States First Army Air Service

After the Armistice was signed on 11 November 1918, American Aero Squadrons moved ahead to former German airfields located in previously occupied France, waiting for permission to enter Germany's Rhineland on 1 December with the Third Army of Occupation (granted on 1 December). Among those airfields, quite a few were located near the city of Longuyon, in the Meurthe-et-Moselle department in north-eastern France, near the German border.

== Overview ==
Noërs Aerodrome, on a plateau 1 mile (1.6 km) southwest of the city of Longuyon. It was used by 94th Aero Squadron from 20 November 1918, flying to Germany on 31 December.

A cluster of airfields were set about 7 miles (11 km) on the southeast of Longuyon:

Joppécourt Aerodrome, position unknown. Used by 166th Aero Squadron 21 November – 5 December 1918, then flew to Trier, in Germany.

Mercy-le-Bas Aerodrome, located 0.1 miles (0.16 km) North of the commune of Mercy-le-Bas, with 1st Aero Squadron from 21 November to 6 December 1918, then to Germany.

Mercy le Haut Aerodrome, position unknown. 462nd Aero Squadron (Construct.) stayed 20 November – 2 December 1918, doing some construction works as IV Corps Observation Group HQ arrived on 21 November 1918 with 12th Aero Squadron. All those units would have been gone by 6 December.

Preutin Aerodrome, position unknown. 9th and 91st Aero Squadrons arrived on 21 November 1918, gone to Germany by 5 December.

Once the American squadrons had departed, the airfields were most probably quickly returned to agricultural use, today with no indications of their wartime use.

== See also ==
- List of Air Service American Expeditionary Force aerodromes in France
