= Coincy Aerodrome =

- Part of American Expeditionary Forces (AEF)
- Located near: Coincy, France
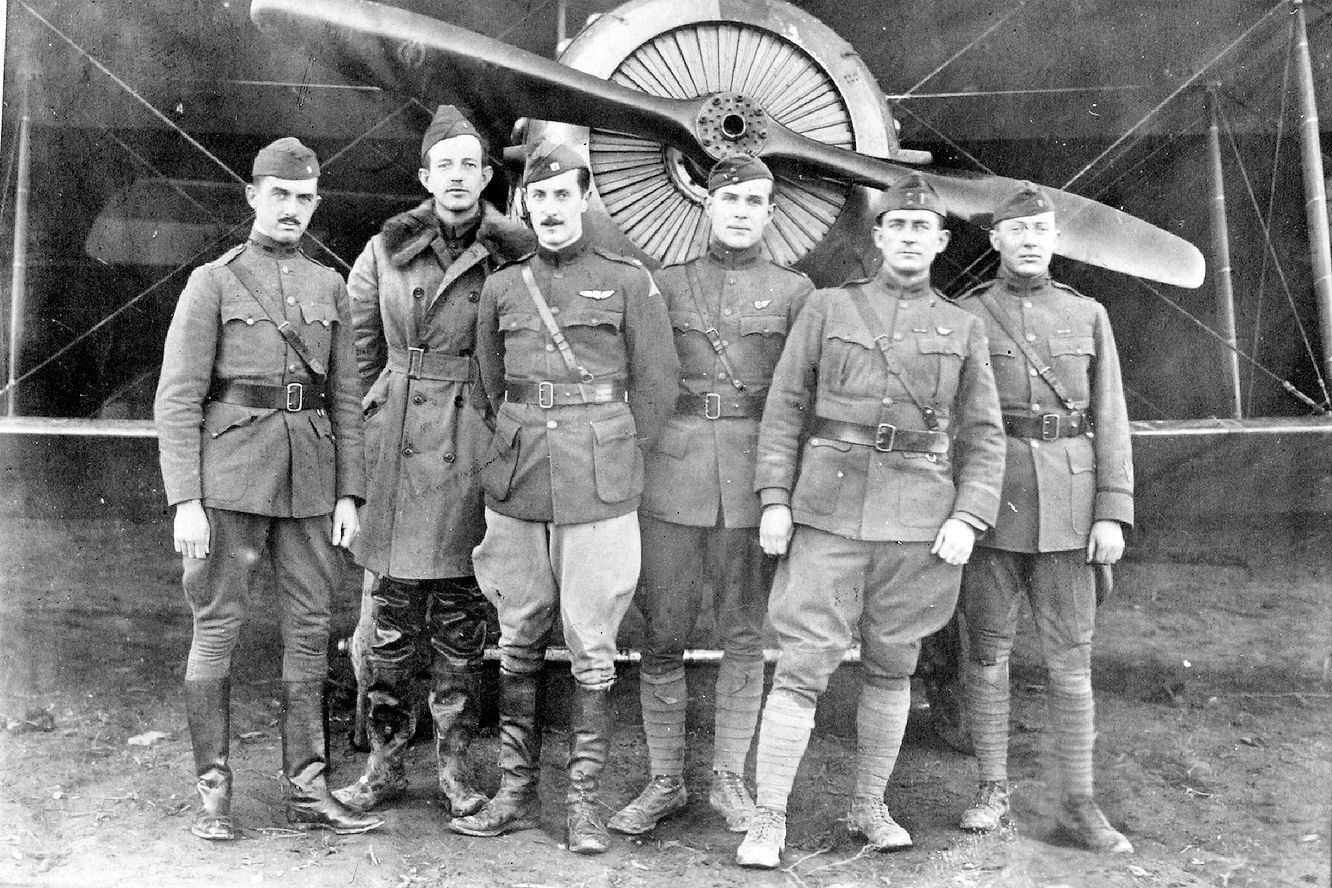
- 1st Aero Squadron pilots standing in front of a Salmson 2A2

Site information
- Type: Combat Airfield
- Controlled by: Air Service, United States Army
- Condition: Agricultural area

Location
- Coordinates: 49°09′30″N 003°23′54″E

Site history
- Built: 1918
- In use: 1918–1919
- Battles/wars: World War I

Garrison information
- Garrison: I Corps Observation Group; United States First Army Air Service

Coincy Aerodrome was a temporary World War I airfield in France. In its short history it was used by French, German, and American squadrons (at different times). It was located 1.0 mile (1.6 km) west of Coincy, in the Aisne department in north-eastern France, approximately 35 miles (56 km) west of Reims.

== Overview ==
The airfield was established by the French "Aéronautique Militaire" in early 1918 and used by its escadrilles until it had to be evacuated in May 1918 before the German push towards Paris. It was then used by the German Jastas until the Allied counter-offensive liberated the area in the first days of August 1918.

Once cleared, the airfield was first used as an advanced landing ground by the 94th Aero Squadron (1st Pursuit Group), then for a very short period by the I Corps Observation Group for its HQ, 1st Aero Squadron and 12th Aero Squadron (10-13 August 1918).

After this very brief use, many French units were stationed here until the last days of October 1918. Today it is a series of cultivated fields located west of Coincy, on the north side of the D 310, between Coincy and Rocourt, with no indications of its wartime use.

== See also ==
- List of Air Service American Expeditionary Force aerodromes in France
