= Demange-Baudignécourt =

- Commune
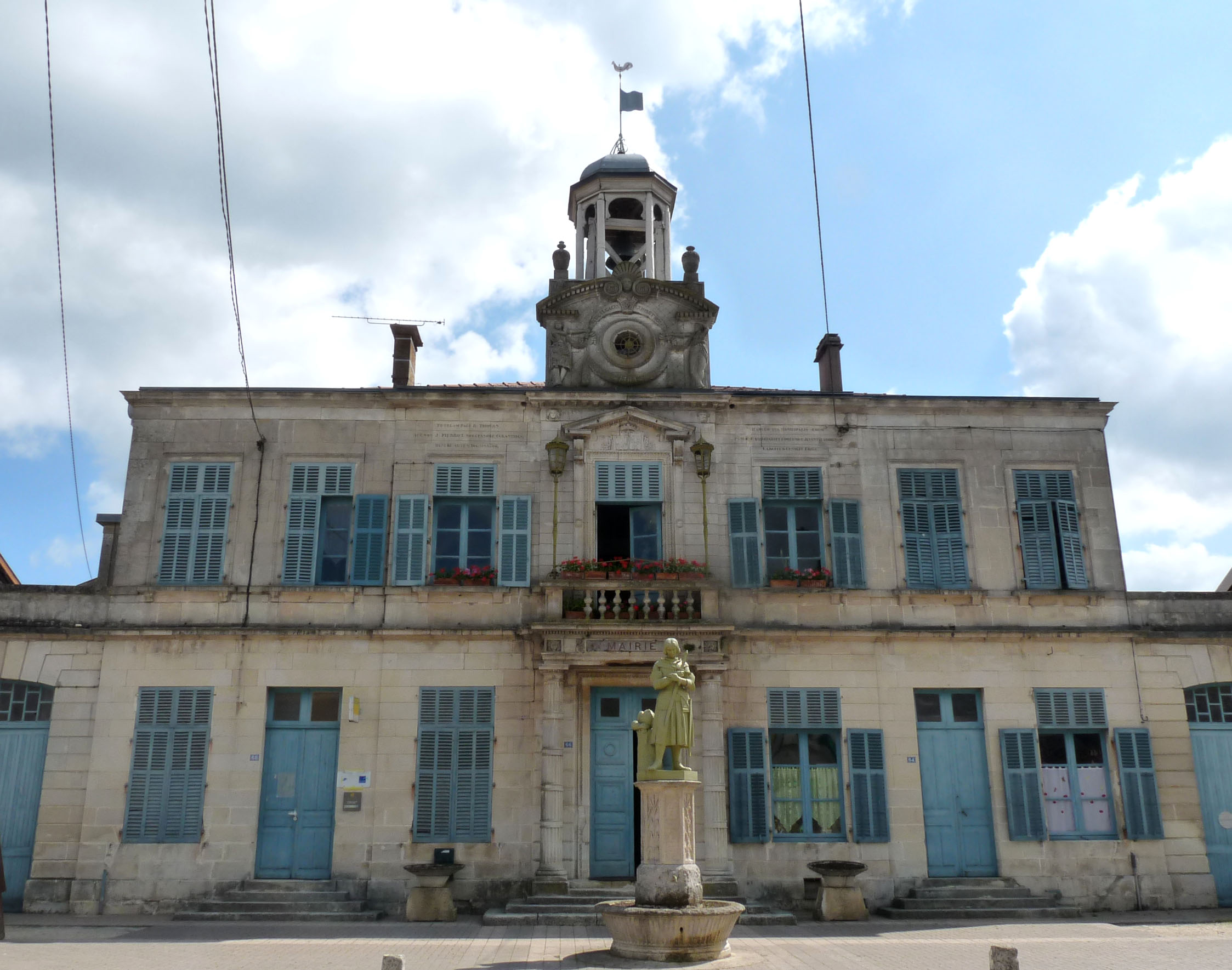
- The town hall in Demange-aux-Eaux
- Location of Demange-Baudignécourt
- Location within France Location within Grand Est
- Coordinates: 48°34′57″N 5°27′36″E
- Country: France
- Region: Grand Est
- Department: Meuse
- Arrondissement: Commercy
- Canton: Ligny-en-Barrois
- Intercommunality: Portes de Meuse

Government
  - Mayor (2020–2026): Jean-Claude Andre
- Area^{1}: 31.14 km^{2} (12.02 sq mi)
- Highest elevation: 396 m (1,299 ft)
- Lowest elevation: 267 m (876 ft)
- Population (2023): 508
  - Density: 16.3/km^{2} (42.3/sq mi)
- Time zone: UTC+01:00 (CET)
  - Summer (DST): UTC+02:00 (CEST)
- INSEE/Postal code: 55150 /55130
- ^{1} French Land Register data, which excludes lakes, ponds, glaciers > 1 km^{2} (0.386 sq mi or 247 acres) and river estuaries.

Demange-Baudignécourt (French pronunciation: [dəmɑ̃ʒ bodiɲekuʁ]) is a commune in the Meuse department in Grand Est in north-eastern France. It was established on 1 January 2019 by merger of the former communes of Demange-aux-Eaux (the seat) and Baudignécourt.

== See also ==
- Communes of the Meuse department
