= Verdun Aerodrome =

- Part of American Expeditionary Forces (AEF)
- Located near: Verdun, France

Site information
- Type: Combat Airfield
- Controlled by: Air Service, United States Army
- Condition: Agricultural area

Location
- Coordinates: 49°09′33″N 005°24′47″E

Site history
- Built: 1918
- In use: 1918–1919
- Battles/wars: World War I

Garrison information
- Garrison: 1st Pursuit Group (Elements); United States First Army Air Service

Verdun, in the Meuse department, is a small city on the river Meuse, which was heavily fortified before WWI. A military airfield was created in 1912 out of the eastern part of the city, in a place called "Faubourg Pavé" (Paved Suburb). Navigation charts did not show the airfield.

From the beginning of the war until the outbreak of the Battle of Verdun, in February 1916, the Faubourg Pavé airfield was widely used by the French Air Service. As the battle developed, many airfields were built further away from the front line and "Faubourg Pavé" had to be abandoned.

In 1918, many American Air Service squadrons flew from airfields around Verdun, as Julvécourt, Souilly, Lemmes or Béthelainville. Sources also mention temporary detachment of the 95th Aero Squadron to a "Verdun" airfield, without any further details.

== Known units assigned ==
- Detachment of 27th Aero Squadron (Pursuit) 25 September - 12 December 1918.
- Detachment of 95th Aero Squadron (Pursuit) 7–11 November 1918.

== See also ==
- List of Air Service American Expeditionary Force aerodromes in France
