= Baudignécourt =

Commune in Meuse, France

- Part of Demange-Baudignécourt
- Coat of arms
- Location of Baudignécourt
- Location within France Location within Grand Est
- Coordinates: 48°34′14″N 5°27′45″E
- Country: France
- Region: Grand Est
- Department: Meuse
- Arrondissement: Commercy
- Canton: Ligny-en-Barrois
- Commune: Demange-Baudignécourt
- Area^{1}: 6.28 km^{2} (2.42 sq mi)
- Elevation: 279 m (915 ft)
- Highest elevation: 393 m (1,289 ft)
- Lowest elevation: 273 m (896 ft)
- Population (2023): 66
  - Density: 11/km^{2} (27/sq mi)
- Time zone: UTC+01:00 (CET)
  - Summer (DST): UTC+02:00 (CEST)
- Postal code: 55130
- ^{1} French Land Register data, which excludes lakes, ponds, glaciers > 1 km^{2} (0.386 sq mi or 247 acres) and river estuaries.

Baudignécourt (French pronunciation: [bodiɲekuʁ]) is a former commune in the Meuse department in the Grand Est region in northeastern France. On 1 January 2019, it was merged into the new commune Demange-Baudignécourt.

== See also ==
- Communes of the Meuse department
