= Souilly =

- Commune
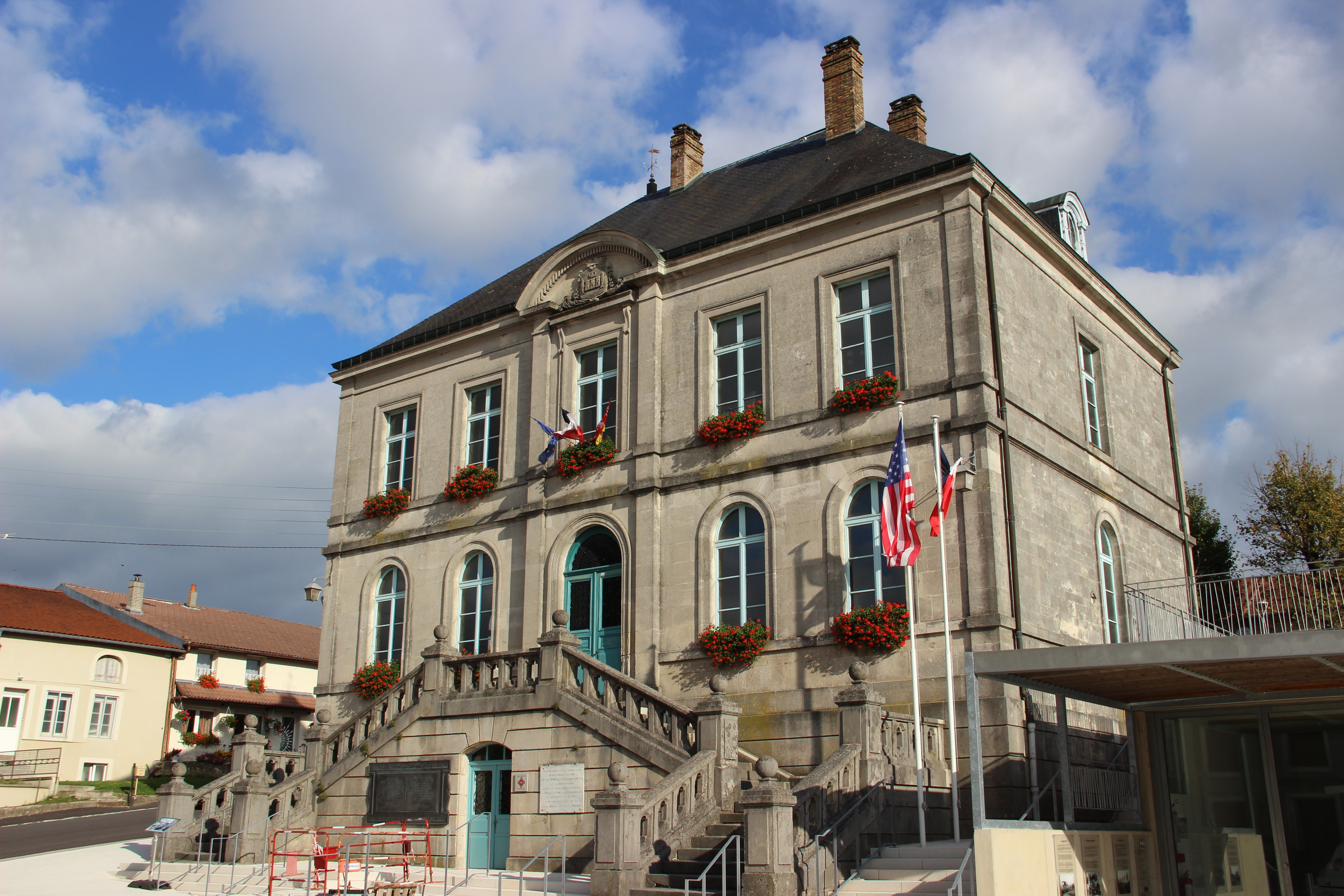
- The town hall in Souilly

- Coat of arms
- Location of Souilly
- Location within France Location within Grand Est
- Coordinates: 49°01′43″N 5°17′14″E
- Country: France
- Region: Grand Est
- Department: Meuse
- Arrondissement: Verdun
- Canton: Dieue-sur-Meuse
- Intercommunality: Val de Meuse - Voie Sacrée

Government
  - Mayor (2020–2026): Armel Lantreibecq
- Area^{1}: 26.59 km^{2} (10.27 sq mi)
- Elevation: 350 m (1,150 ft)
- Highest elevation: 344 m (1,129 ft)
- Lowest elevation: 242 m (794 ft)
- Population (2023): 426
  - Density: 16.0/km^{2} (41.5/sq mi)
- Time zone: UTC+01:00 (CET)
  - Summer (DST): UTC+02:00 (CEST)
- INSEE/Postal code: 55498 /55220
- ^{1} French Land Register data, which excludes lakes, ponds, glaciers > 1 km^{2} (0.386 sq mi or 247 acres) and river estuaries.

Souilly (French pronunciation: [suji]) is a commune in the Meuse department in Grand Est in north-eastern France.

The Town Hall, fronting on the Voie Sacrée, served as headquarters for general Pétain and, later, general Nivelle during the Battle of Verdun in 1916. In 1918, it served as headquarters for general Pershing during the Meuse-Argonne Offensive.
