= Ville-sur-Cousances =

- Commune
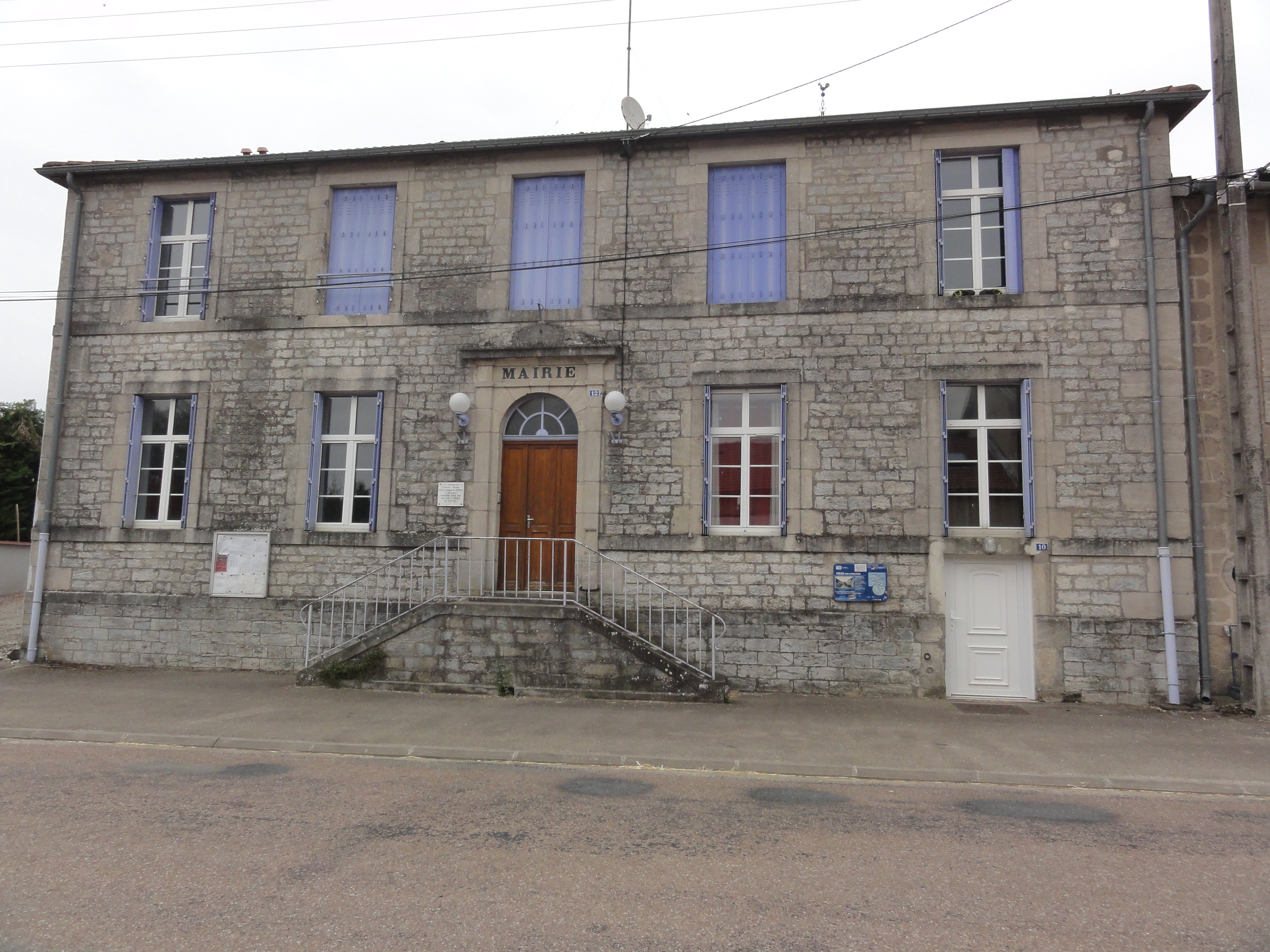
- The town hall in Ville-sur-Cousances
- Location of Ville-sur-Cousances
- Location within France Location within Grand Est
- Coordinates: 49°04′59″N 5°10′35″E
- Country: France
- Region: Grand Est
- Department: Meuse
- Arrondissement: Verdun
- Canton: Dieue-sur-Meuse
- Intercommunality: Val de Meuse - Voie Sacrée

Government
  - Mayor (2020–2026): Christian Maurer
- Area^{1}: 9.59 km^{2} (3.70 sq mi)
- Elevation: 231 m (758 ft)
- Highest elevation: 297 m (974 ft)
- Lowest elevation: 219 m (719 ft)
- Population (2023): 126
  - Density: 13.1/km^{2} (34.0/sq mi)
- Time zone: UTC+01:00 (CET)
  - Summer (DST): UTC+02:00 (CEST)
- INSEE/Postal code: 55567 /55120
- ^{1} French Land Register data, which excludes lakes, ponds, glaciers > 1 km^{2} (0.386 sq mi or 247 acres) and river estuaries.

Ville-sur-Cousances is a commune in the Meuse department in Grand Est in north-eastern France.

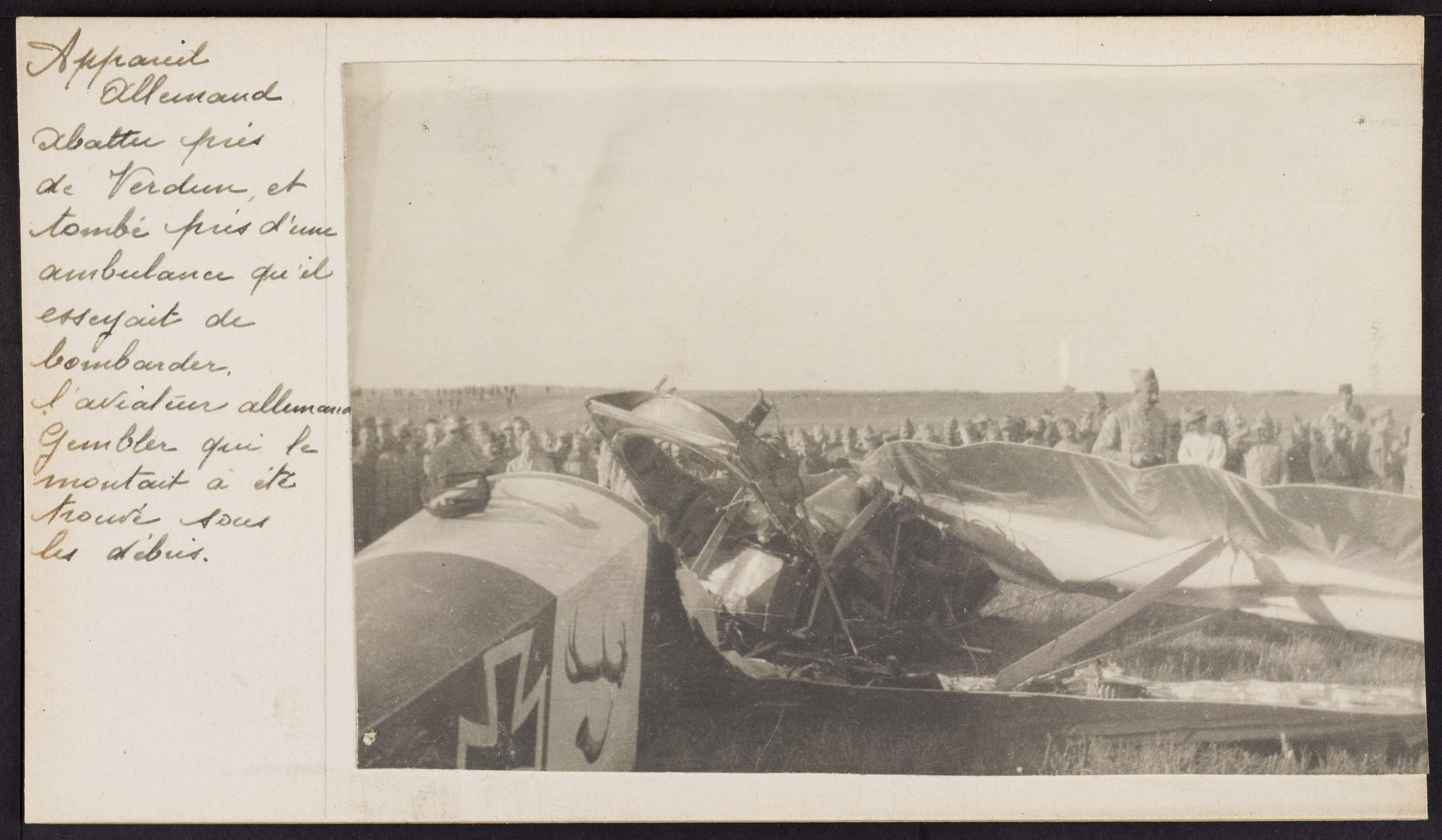
Crashed German AEG J.I aeroplane at Verdun France; 7-10-1917 Albrecht Gembler & Fritz Sagner FA(A) 254 downed near Ville-sur- Cousances by Sgt. (Felix) Gohier (Escadrille N. 85).

== See also ==
- Communes of the Meuse department
