= Saizerais =

- Commune
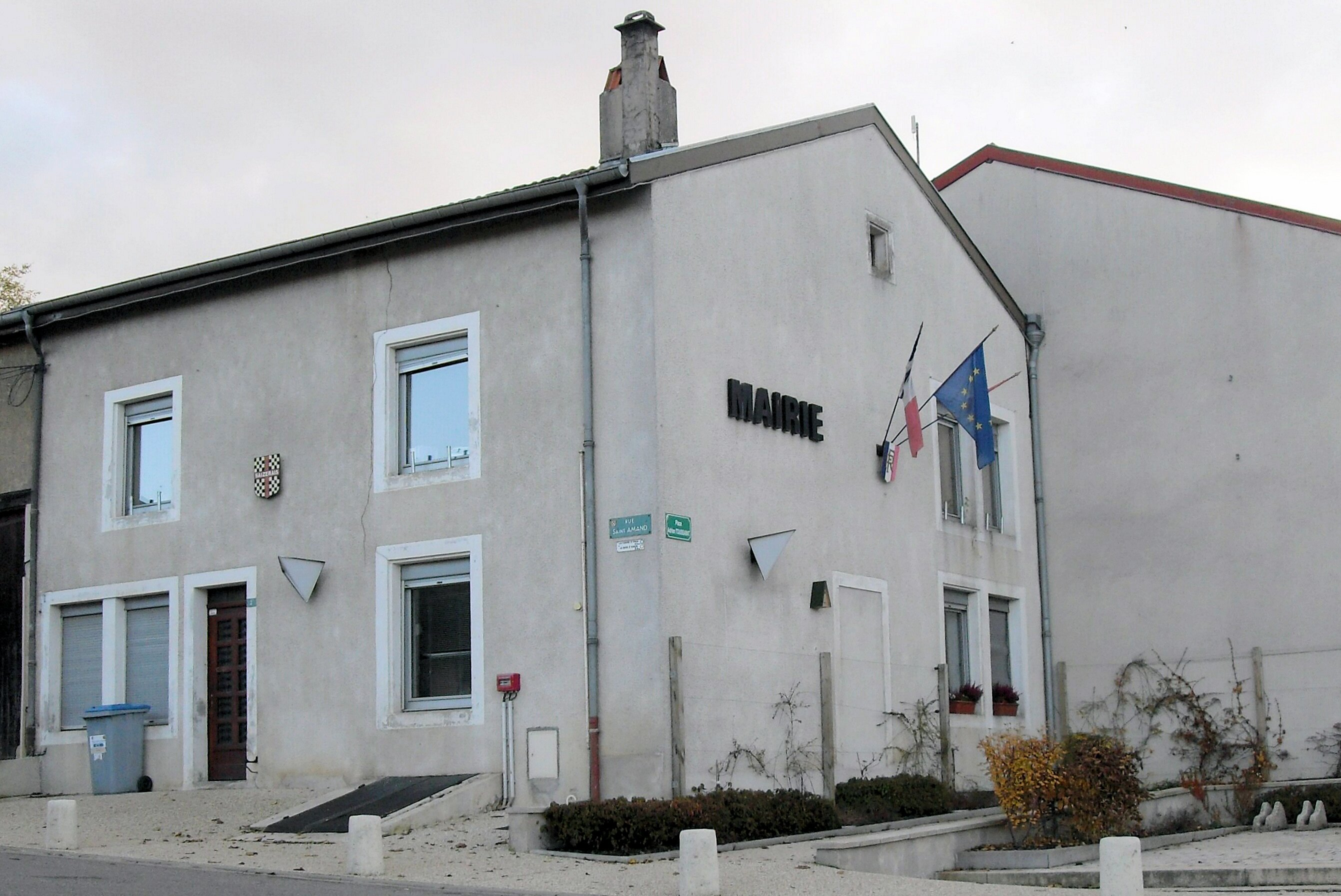
- The town hall in Saizerais

- Coat of arms
- Location of Saizerais
- Location within France Location within Grand Est
- Coordinates: 48°47′28″N 6°02′41″E
- Country: France
- Region: Grand Est
- Department: Meurthe-et-Moselle
- Arrondissement: Nancy
- Canton: Le Nord-Toulois
- Intercommunality: CC Bassin de Pompey

Government
  - Mayor (2020–2026): Ludovic Leggeri
- Area^{1}: 14.44 km^{2} (5.58 sq mi)
- Elevation: 250 m (820 ft)
- Highest elevation: 301 m (988 ft)
- Lowest elevation: 203 m (666 ft)
- Population (2023): 1,453
  - Density: 100.6/km^{2} (260.6/sq mi)
- Time zone: UTC+01:00 (CET)
  - Summer (DST): UTC+02:00 (CEST)
- INSEE/Postal code: 54490 /54380
- ^{1} French Land Register data, which excludes lakes, ponds, glaciers > 1 km^{2} (0.386 sq mi or 247 acres) and river estuaries.

Saizerais (French pronunciation: [sɛzʁɛ]) is a commune in the Meurthe-et-Moselle department in north-eastern France.

== See also ==
- Communes of the Meurthe-et-Moselle department
- Parc naturel régional de Lorraine
