= Bonne Maison Aerodrome =

World War I airfield in France

- Part of American Expeditionary Forces (AEF)
- Located near: Fismes, France
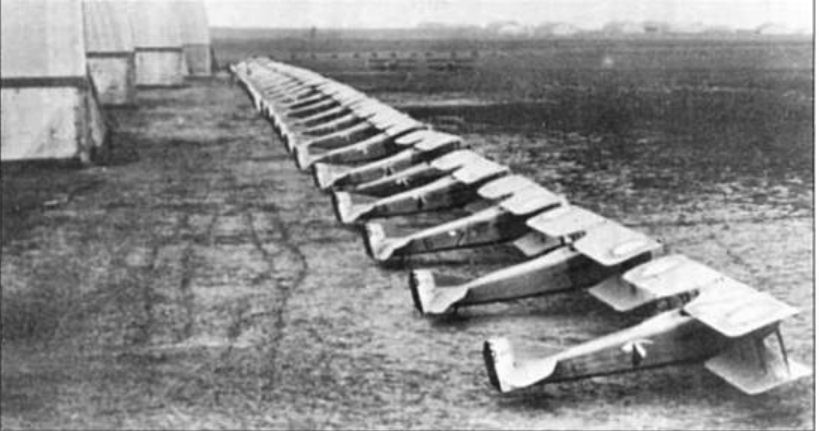
- SPAD S.VII aircraft of SPA.3 and SPA.73, La Bonne Maison Aerodrome, France, July 1917

Site information
- Type: Combat Airfield
- Controlled by: Air Service, United States Army
- Condition: Agricultural area

Location
- Coordinates: 49°16′34″N 003°43′09″E; Exact location

Site history
- Built: 1918
- In use: 1918
- Battles/wars: World War I

Garrison information
- Garrison: 3d Pursuit Group; United States First Army Air Service

La Bonne Maison Aerodrome was a temporary World War I airfield in France, used both by French units and by squadrons of the Air Service, United States Army. It was located near the city of Fismes, in the Marne department, on the plateau above the village of Courville, east of the farm "La Bonne Maison".

It was built some time in early 1917, with the "Groupe de Combat no 12" arriving on 26 March, in support of the French 6th Army. It saw activity until spring 1918, and the last unit to be stationed here was Air Service 103rd Aero Squadron, 10 to 30 April. Earlier in February, the squadron had arrived from training with 3rd AIC on Issoudun Aerodrome at "La Noblette" aerodrome where the American pilots of the "Escadrille Lafayette" joined it, operating as part of the "Groupe de Combat no 21" in support of the French 4th Army.

After the start of the German Spring offensives, 103rd Aero Squadron left GC no 21 and flew to La Bonne Maison, with the French 6th Army, then moved to Flanders on 30 April with French "Détachement d'Armée du Nord" during the Battle of the Lys.

== Operations (103rd Aero Squadron) ==
On 11 April, the squadron flew a patrol of two aircraft. During the patrol, Lt. Baer attacked a German biplane, firing 50 rounds. The enemy aircraft spun out of control and was lost in the clouds near Bouvancourt.

On 12 April, the squadron carried out four patrols, During the first patrol, Capt. Biddle attacked a German aircraft, firing about 100 rounds, causing the aircraft to spew white smoke as it fell out of the sky about 500 meters southeast of Forbury. Combat was made twice more during the day, causing the Germans to turn back to their own lines.

Due to rain, no patrols were flown until 20 April when four patrols were carried out, one of which shot down an enemy observation balloon about 18:00. Two German aircraft were also shot down during the day. Again, poor flying conditions were encountered and no patrols were flown for the next ten days.

On 30 April, with the battle ended, the squadron again moved by train to Bray-Dunes aerodrome, near Dunkerque for operations in the Flanders area with the French "Détachement d'Armée du Nord".

== Subsequent use ==
The airfield was perhaps used by the Germans during their drive towards the river Marne in late Spring 1918, as the nearby aerodrome of "La Cense" was until the end of July, then no use is known, as the battle front quickly moved towards NE, making the airfield redundant. With the end of the war, its buildings were dismantled and the fields returned to the local farmers for agricultural use. Today not any traces of it remain.

== See also ==
- List of Air Service American Expeditionary Force aerodromes in France
