= Demange-aux-Eaux =

- Part of Demange-Baudignécourt
- Coat of arms
- Location of Demange-aux-Eaux
- Location within France Location within Grand Est
- Coordinates: 48°34′57″N 5°27′36″E
- Country: France
- Region: Grand Est
- Department: Meuse
- Arrondissement: Commercy
- Canton: Ligny-en-Barrois
- Commune: Demange-Baudignécourt
- Area^{1}: 24.86 km^{2} (9.60 sq mi)
- Elevation: 285 m (935 ft)
- Highest elevation: 396 m (1,299 ft)
- Lowest elevation: 267 m (876 ft)
- Population (2016): 505
  - Density: 20.3/km^{2} (52.6/sq mi)
- Time zone: UTC+01:00 (CET)
  - Summer (DST): UTC+02:00 (CEST)
- Postal code: 55130
- ^{1} French Land Register data, which excludes lakes, ponds, glaciers > 1 km^{2} (0.386 sq mi or 247 acres) and river estuaries.

Demange-aux-Eaux (French pronunciation: [dəmɑ̃ʒ o.z‿o]) is a former commune in the Meuse department in Grand Est in north-eastern France. On 1 January 2019, it was merged into the new commune Demange-Baudignécourt.

== See also ==
- Communes of the Meuse department
