= Delouze-Rosières =

- Commune
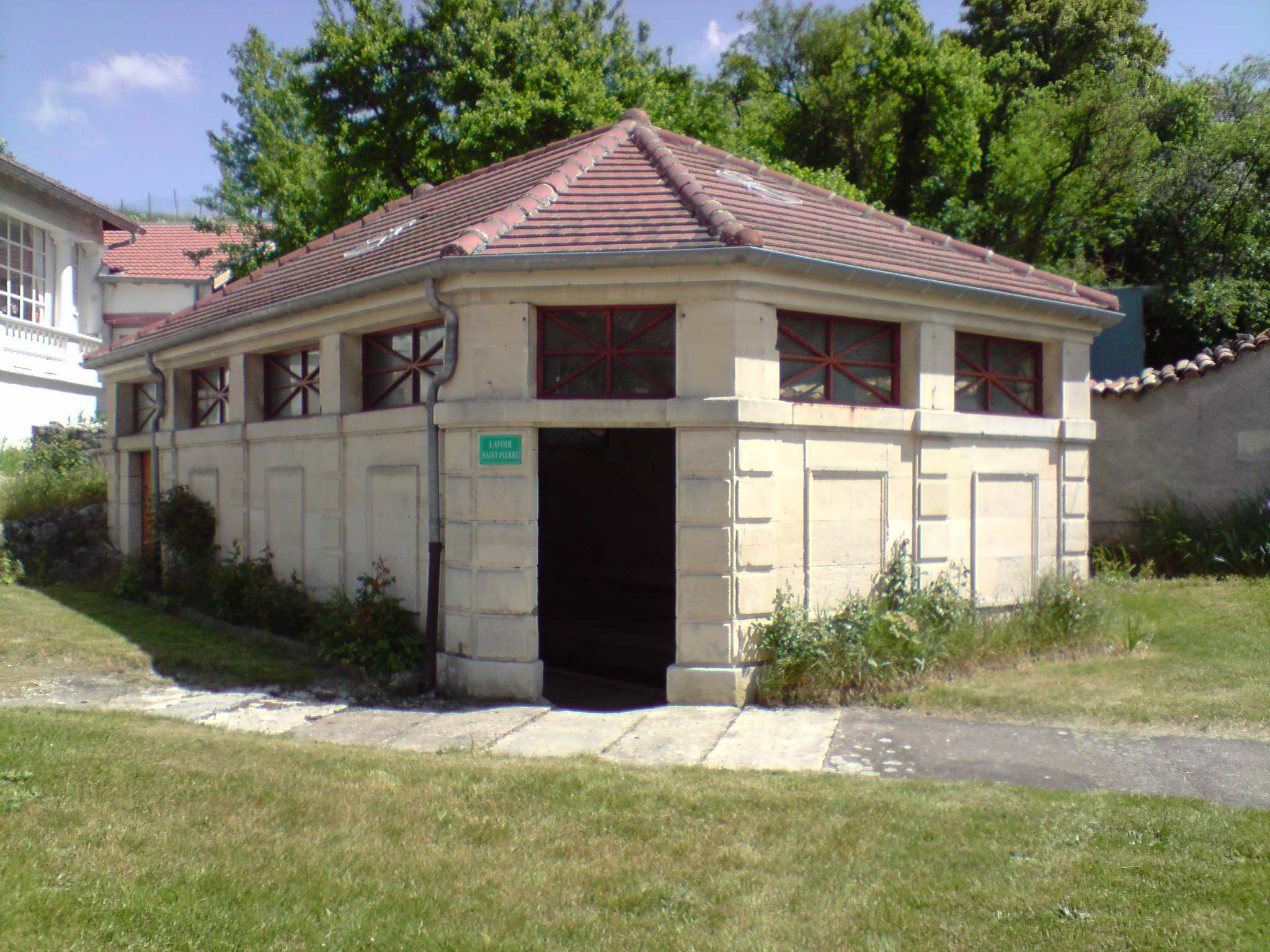
- The wash house in Delouze

- Coat of arms
- Location of Delouze-Rosières
- Location within France Location within Grand Est
- Coordinates: 48°33′52″N 5°31′21″E
- Country: France
- Region: Grand Est
- Department: Meuse
- Arrondissement: Commercy
- Canton: Ligny-en-Barrois

Government
  - Mayor (2020–2026): François-Xavier Carre
- Area^{1}: 15.08 km^{2} (5.82 sq mi)
- Elevation: 280 m (920 ft)
- Highest elevation: 405 m (1,329 ft)
- Lowest elevation: 295 m (968 ft)
- Population (2023): 121
  - Density: 8.02/km^{2} (20.8/sq mi)
- Time zone: UTC+01:00 (CET)
  - Summer (DST): UTC+02:00 (CEST)
- INSEE/Postal code: 55148 /55130
- ^{1} French Land Register data, which excludes lakes, ponds, glaciers > 1 km^{2} (0.386 sq mi or 247 acres) and river estuaries.

Delouze-Rosières (French pronunciation: [dəluz ʁozjɛʁ]) is a commune in the Meuse department in Grand Est in north-eastern France. It was created in 1973 by the merger of two former communes: Delouze and Rosières-en-Blois. It is approximately 25 miles (40 km) west-southwest of Toul.

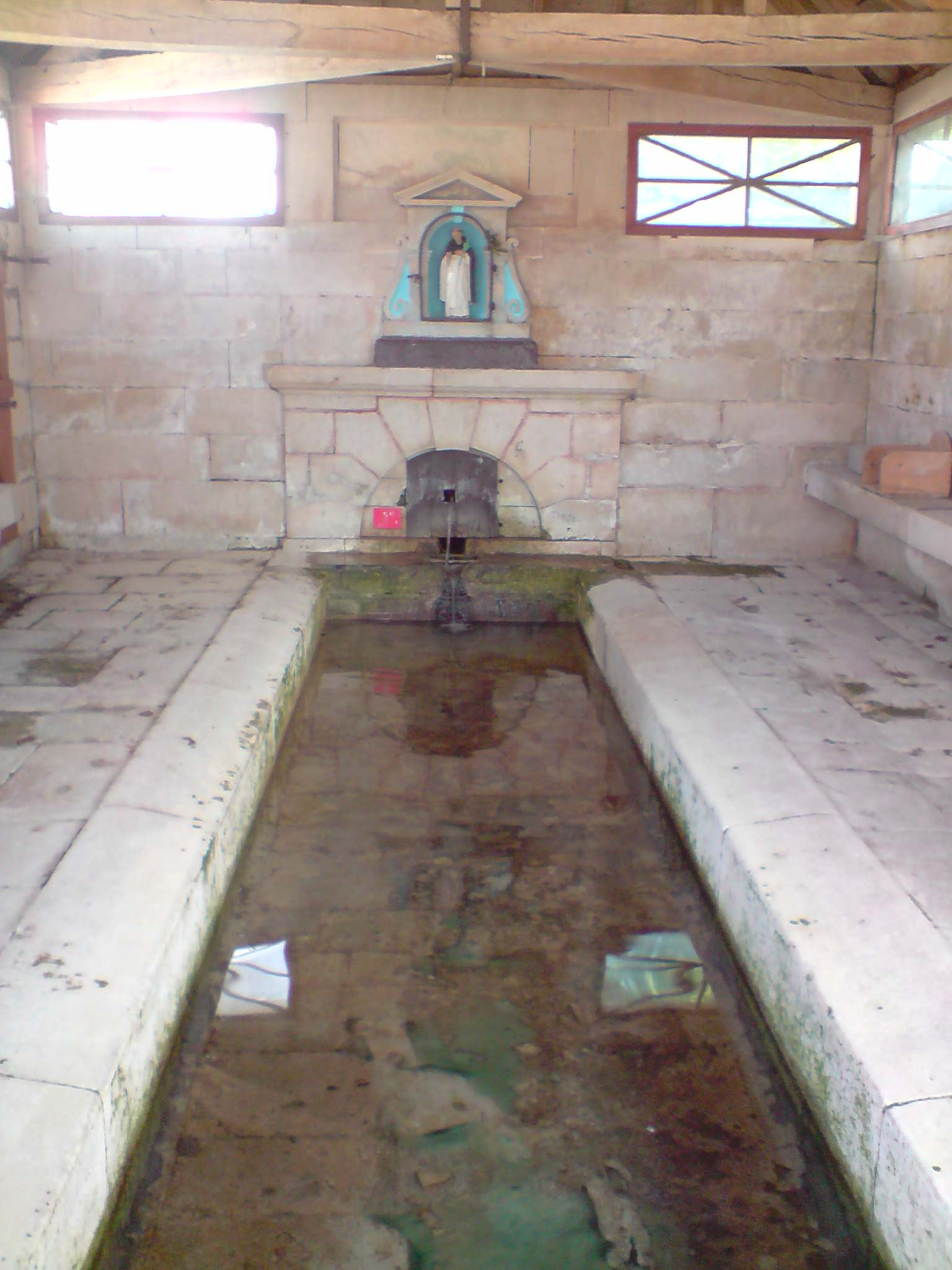

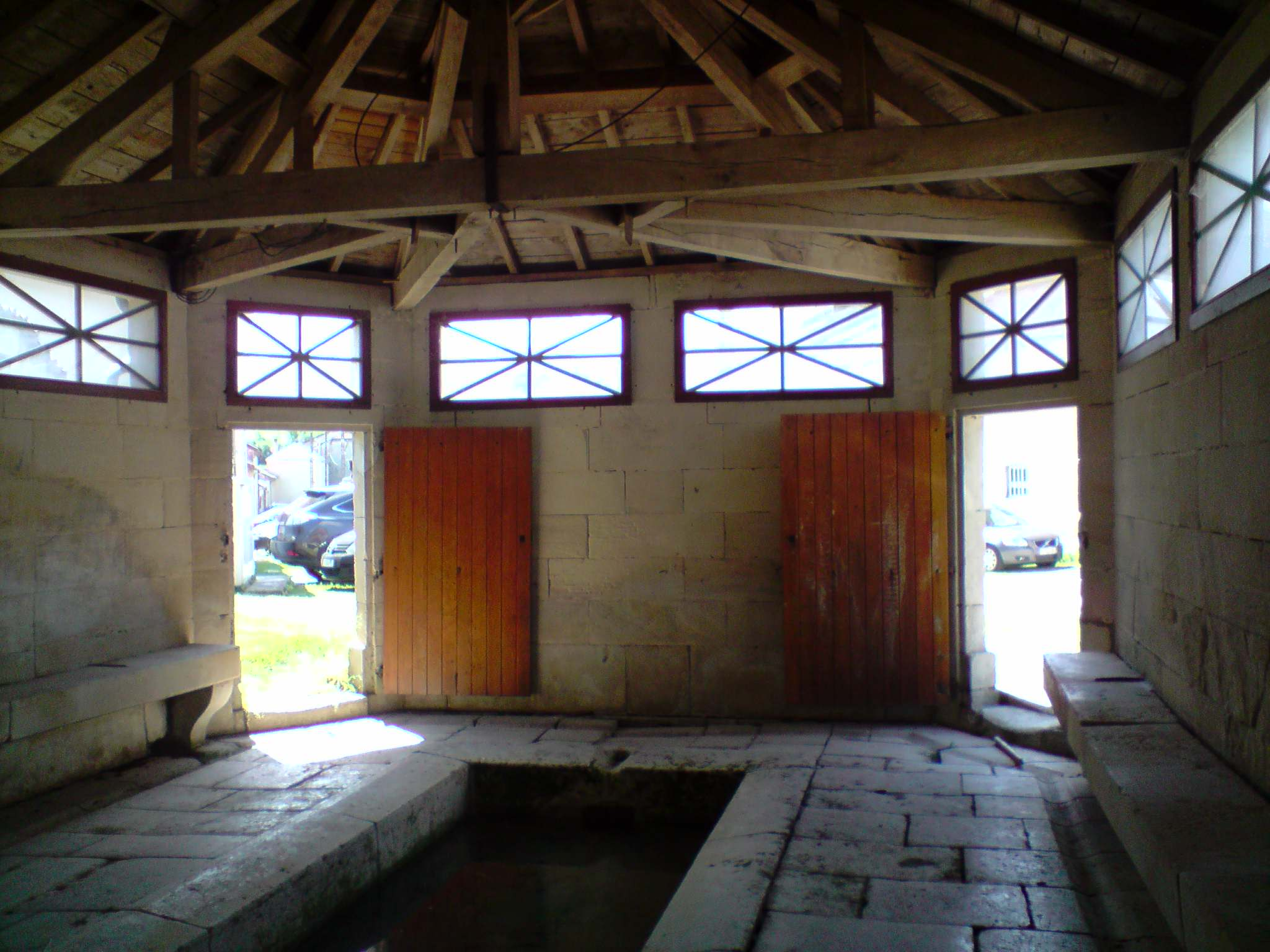

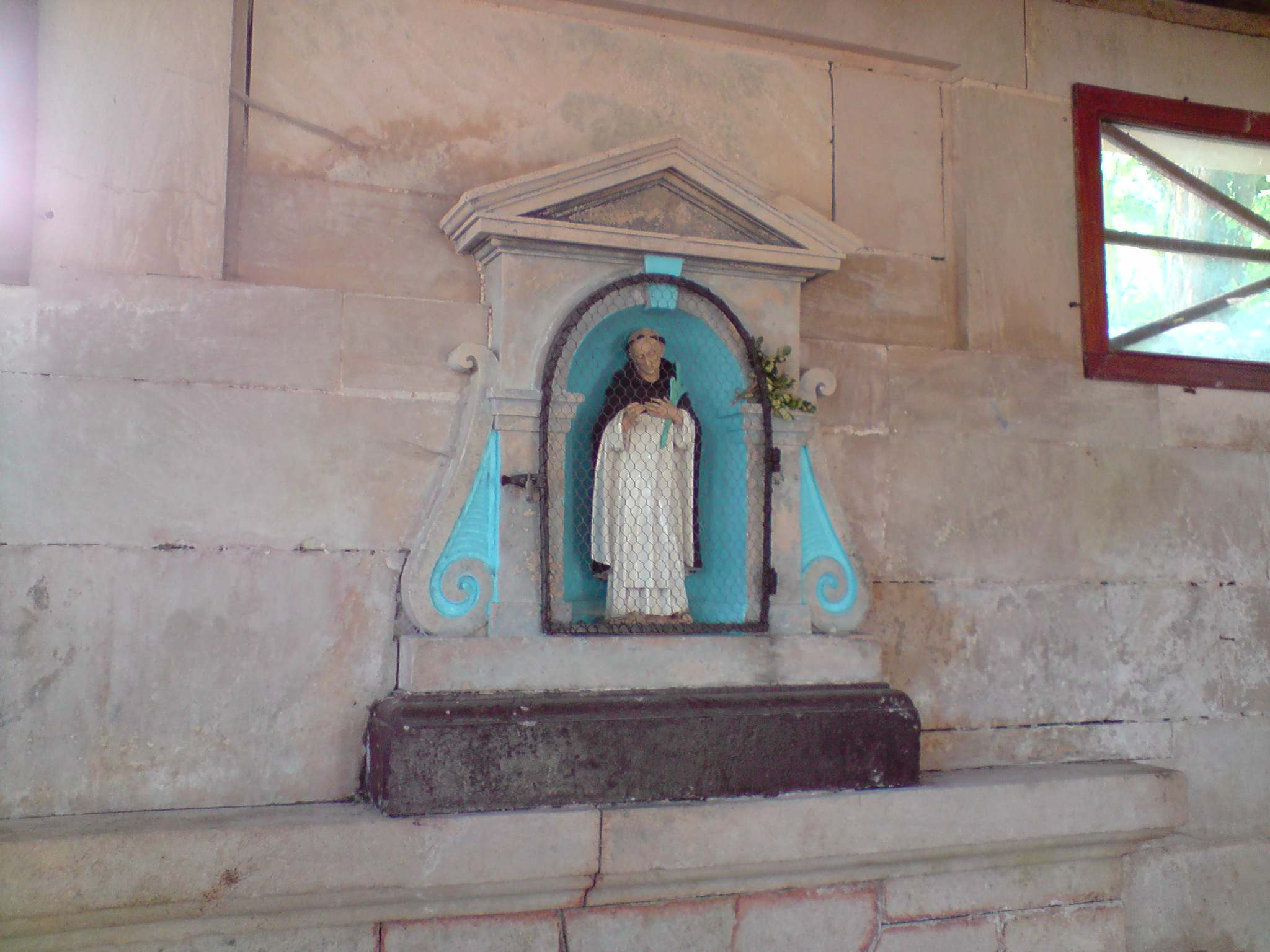

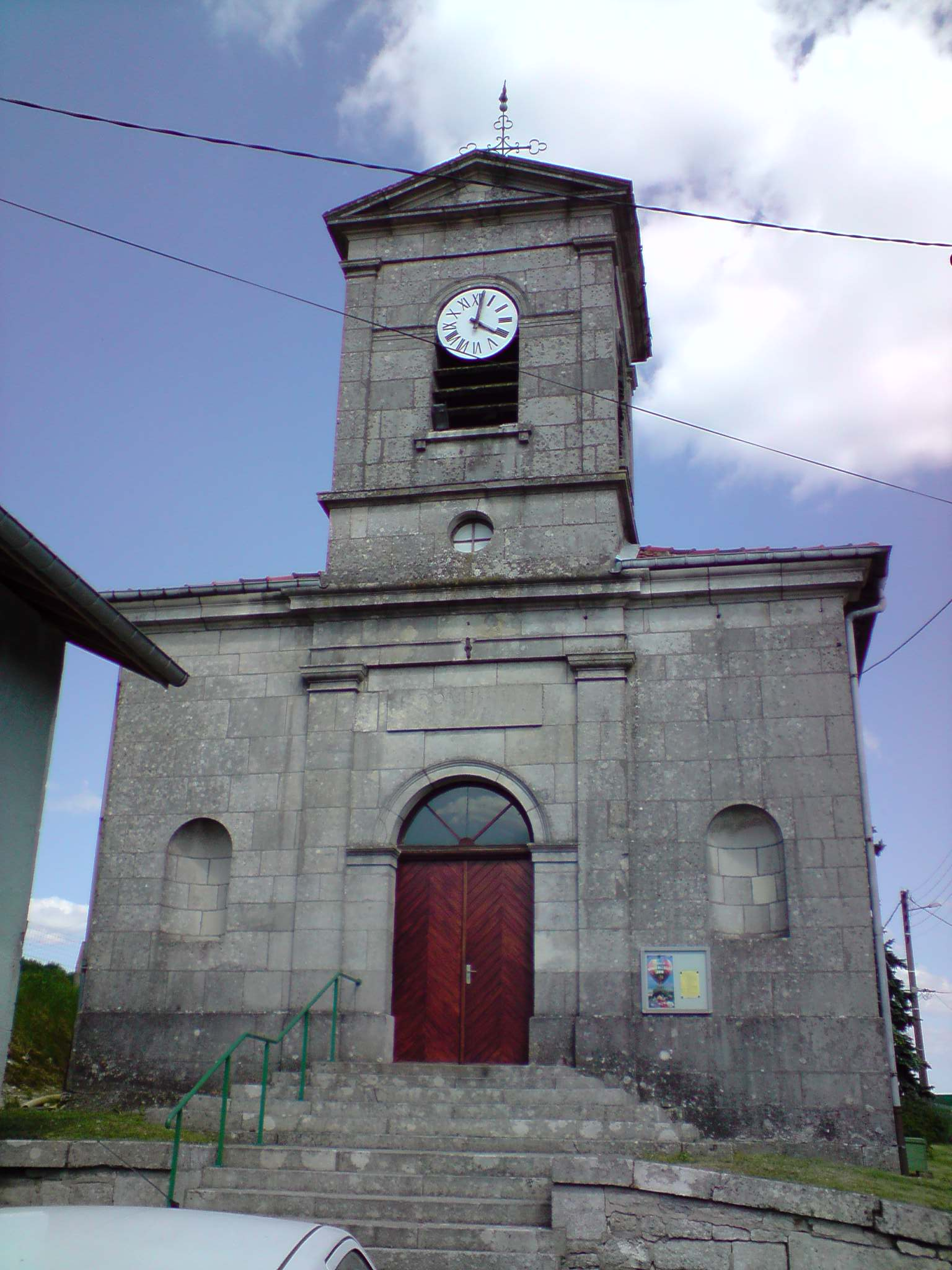

== See also ==
- Communes of the Meuse department
