= Longuyon =

- Commune
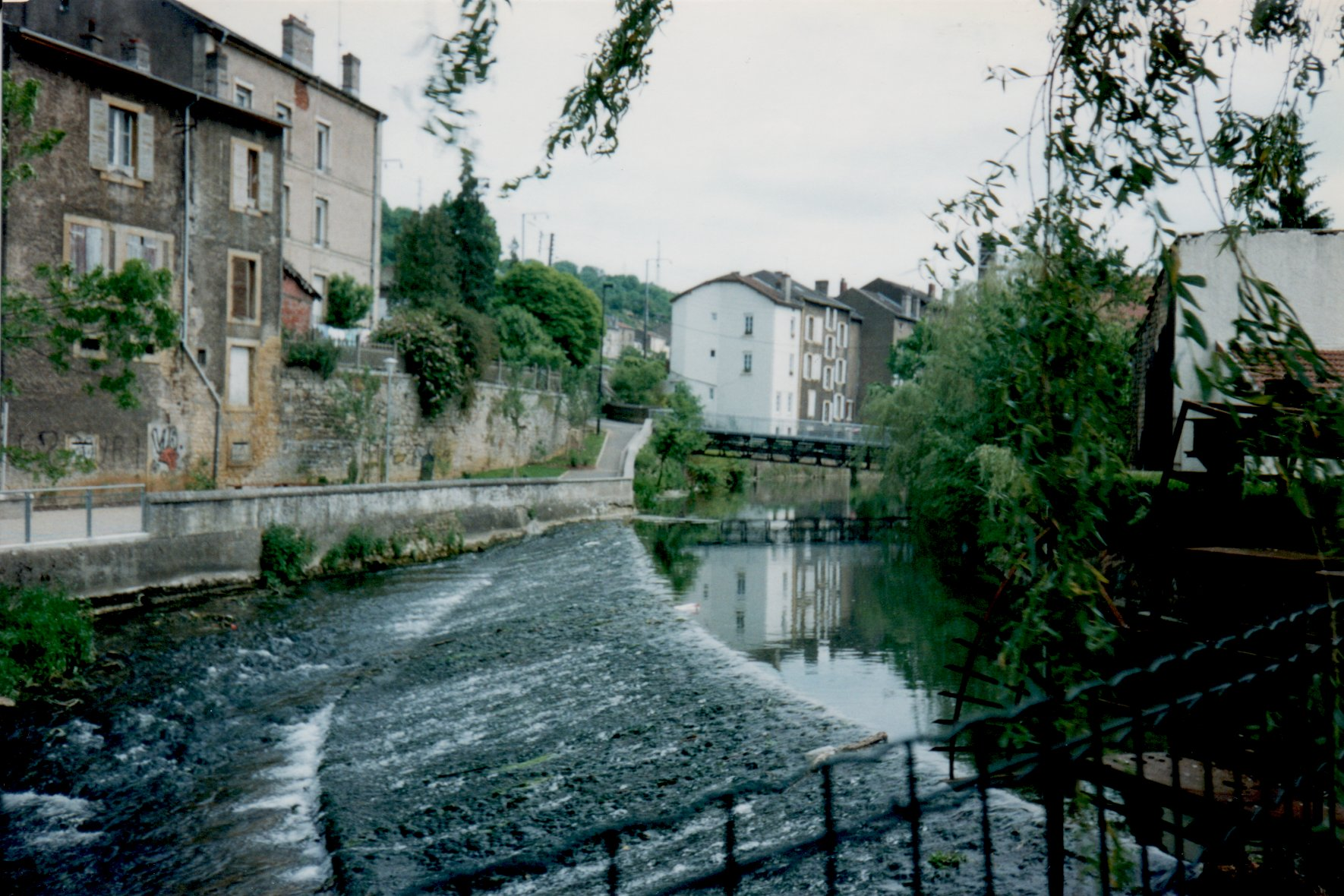
- Crusnes River in Longuyon

- Coat of arms
- Location of Longuyon
- Location within France Location within Grand Est
- Coordinates: 49°26′52″N 5°36′05″E
- Country: France
- Region: Grand Est
- Department: Meurthe-et-Moselle
- Arrondissement: Val-de-Briey
- Canton: Mont-Saint-Martin

Government
  - Mayor (2020–2026): Jean-Pierre Jacque
- Area^{1}: 29.7 km^{2} (11.5 sq mi)
- Elevation: 218 m (715 ft)
- Highest elevation: 389 m (1,276 ft)
- Lowest elevation: 203 m (666 ft)
- Population (2023): 5,134
  - Density: 173/km^{2} (448/sq mi)
- Time zone: UTC+01:00 (CET)
  - Summer (DST): UTC+02:00 (CEST)
- INSEE/Postal code: 54322 /54260
- Website: longuyon.fr
- ^{1} French Land Register data, which excludes lakes, ponds, glaciers > 1 km^{2} (0.386 sq mi or 247 acres) and river estuaries.

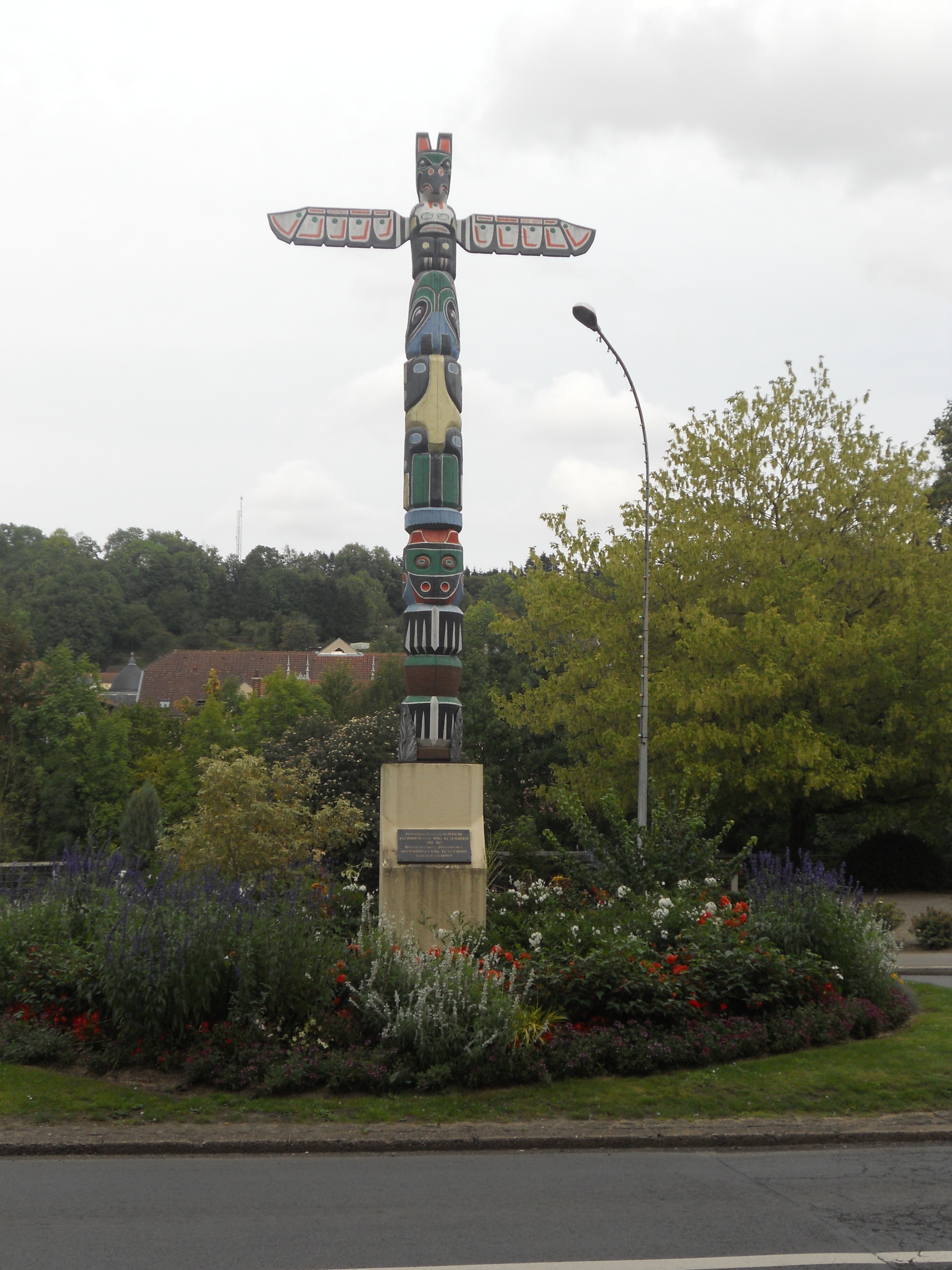
Canadian First Nations totem pole in Longuyon

Longuyon (French pronunciation: [lɔ̃ɡɥijɔ̃]) is a commune in the Meurthe-et-Moselle department in the Grand Est region of north-eastern France. The inhabitants are called Longuyonnais.

== Geography ==
Longuyon is located at the confluence of the rivers Chiers and Crusnes, 18 kilometres (11 mi) southwest of the commune of Longwy. It is bordered on the north by the Belgian province of Luxembourg, and just south of the Belgian village of Grandcourt.

== History ==
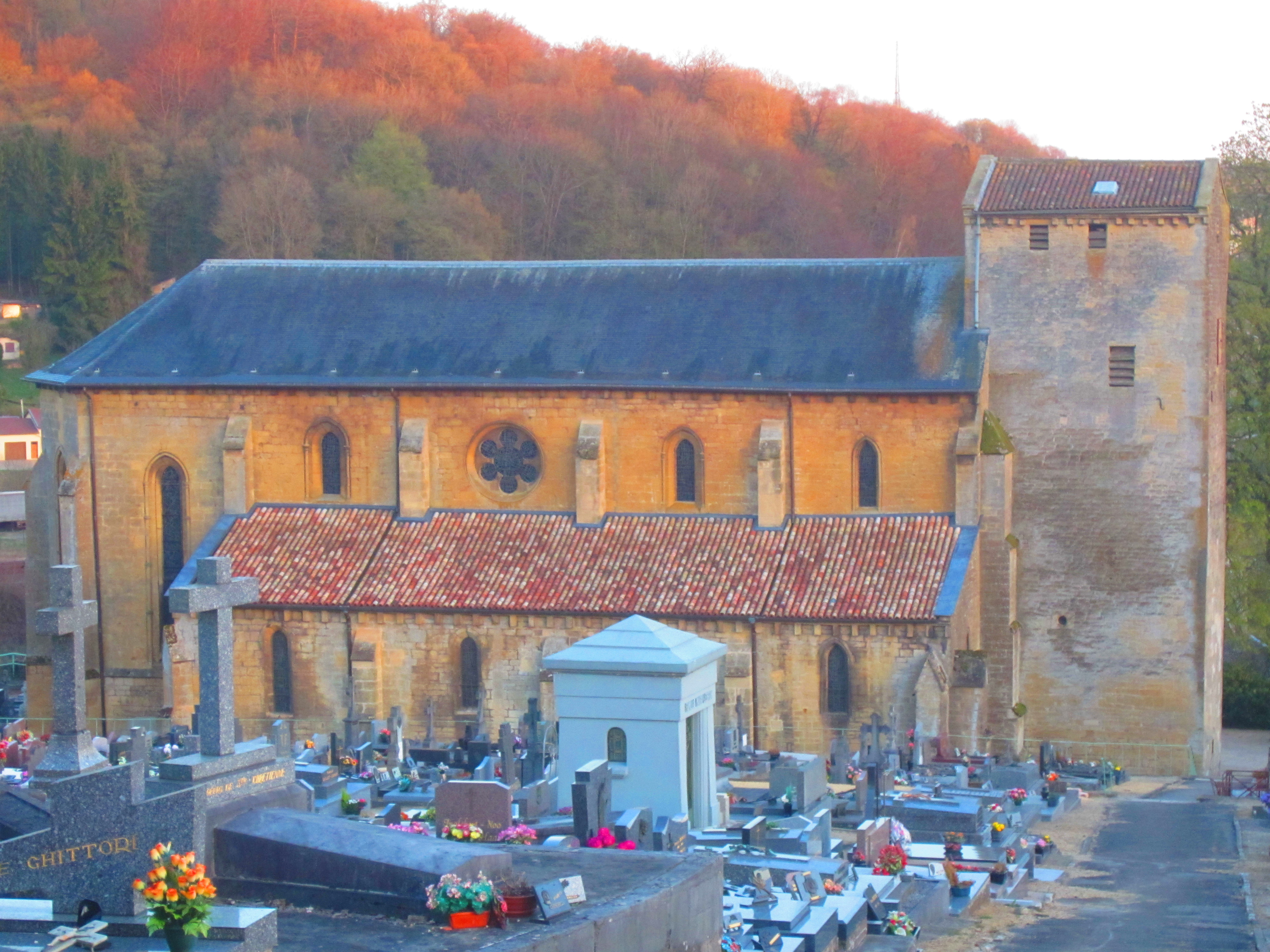
Saint Agatha's Church and cemetery

The town is named after a "long ford" (from the Latin longa guada) that allowed crossing of the Chiers in Roman times. It was known as Longagio (634), Longio (973), Longione (973), monasterri longagionis (10th century), Longion (1030), Longuion (1209), Longuio (1756).

Several Gallo-Roman sites were excavated in 1934; they contained the remains of substructures and fragments of painted plaster. A necropolis of the later Roman Empire was excavated in 1843 in Magé.

The first mention of Longuyon (as Longagio) dates from 634. At that time there was already a chapel dedicated to Saint Agatha. It was designated as a collegiate church in 1120. In the seventeenth century, it served as a barracks for French soldiers in 1636.

The castle of Mussy, first mentioned in 1144, was razed in 1670 by French occupation troops by order of Louis XIV.

Longuyon was a capital of the Bailiwick of Longuyon from June 1751 to 1789. It was designated as the capital of the Canton of Longuyon until March 2015.

In 1914 the town had 2,300 inhabitants. It was devastated on August 23–24 of that year by the invasion of Prussian infantry during the Great War. Some 86 inhabitants: men, women, and children, were executed by firing squad.

Longuyon has long been an important railroad crossroads. It is located between the iron ore of the Briey basin and the coal mining area of the North.

The apartment blocks on the southwestern edge of town, still called "La Cité Canadienne", were home to Royal Canadian Air Force staff and their families in the 1950s and 1960s, when the RCAF had an airbase at nearby Marville. The streets were named after Canadian cities, such as Toronto, Montreal, etc. A traditional First Nations totem pole was erected as a monument to the Canadian presence in Longuyon.

== Population ==
Historical population
Year	Pop.	±% p.a.
1968	6,460	—
1975	7,404	+1.97%
1982	6,993	−0.81%
1990	6,064	−1.77%
1999	5,876	−0.35%
2007	5,711	−0.36%
2012	5,523	−0.67%
2017	5,320	−0.75%
2023	5,134	−0.59%
Source: INSEE

== Attractions ==
The prominent buildings in Longuyon include the Collegiate Church of St. Agatha from the 13th century. The church was mentioned for the first time in 634 in the will of the deacon Adalgisel Grimo. The St. Agatha monastery was converted to a collegiate church in 973 by the Archbishop of Trier, then into a Benedictine priory in the late twelfth century. It was permanently restored as a collegiate church in the early thirteenth century. The current building was built in the late twelfth and early thirteenth centuries; the base of the tower appears to be slightly earlier. The church was fortified in the sixteenth century with a gatehouse above the western portal and defensive elements. Since the French Revolution and suppression of power of the church, St. Agatha has served as a parish church.

== See also ==
- Jacques de Longuyon
- Communes of the Meurthe-et-Moselle department
