= Coincy, Aisne =

Coincy
- Commune
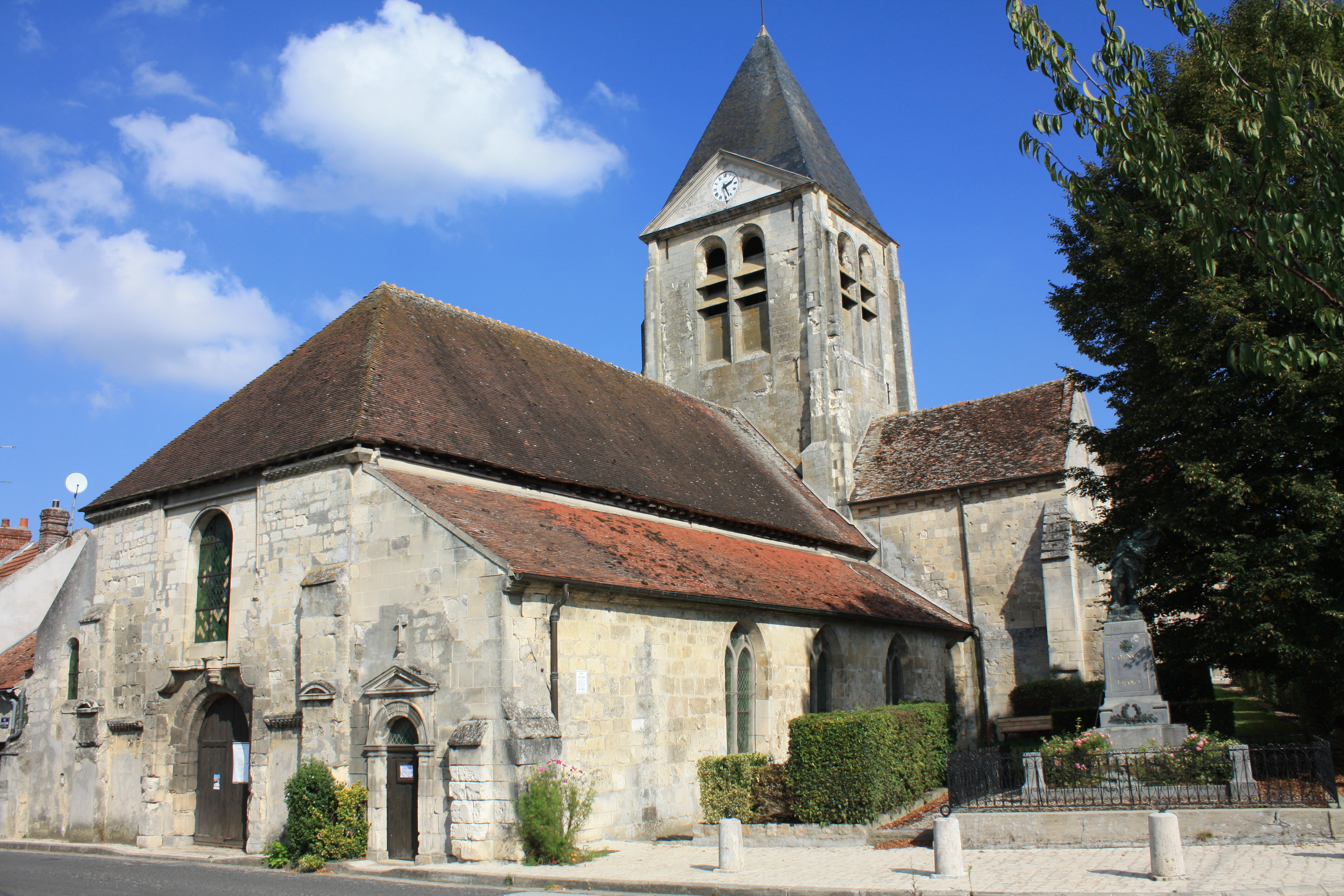
- The church of Coincy

- Coat of arms
- Location of Coincy
- Location within France Location within Hauts-de-France
- Coordinates: 49°09′42″N 3°25′21″E
- Country: France
- Region: Hauts-de-France
- Department: Aisne
- Arrondissement: Château-Thierry
- Canton: Château-Thierry
- Intercommunality: CA Région de Château-Thierry

Government
  - Mayor (2026–32): Alain Arnefaux
- Area^{1}: 17.24 km^{2} (6.66 sq mi)
- Elevation: 102 m (335 ft)
- Highest elevation: 218 m (715 ft)
- Lowest elevation: 91 m (299 ft)
- Population (2023): 1,308
  - Density: 75.87/km^{2} (196.5/sq mi)
- Time zone: UTC+01:00 (CET)
  - Summer (DST): UTC+02:00 (CEST)
- INSEE/Postal code: 02203 /02210
- ^{1} French Land Register data, which excludes lakes, ponds, glaciers > 1 km^{2} (0.386 sq mi or 247 acres) and river estuaries.

Coincy (French pronunciation: [kwɛ̃si]) is a commune in the Aisne department in Hauts-de-France in northern France. It is located approximately 35 miles (56 km) west of Reims (in Marne, Grand-Est).

== Population ==
Historical population
Year	Pop.	±% p.a.
1968	752	—
1975	840	+1.59%
1982	946	+1.71%
1990	1,039	+1.18%
1999	1,156	+1.19%
2007	1,242	+0.90%
2012	1,314	+1.13%
2017	1,310	−0.06%
2023	1,308	−0.03%
Source: INSEE

== See also ==
- Communes of the Aisne department
