= IV Corps Observation Group =

Unit of the Air Service, United States Army

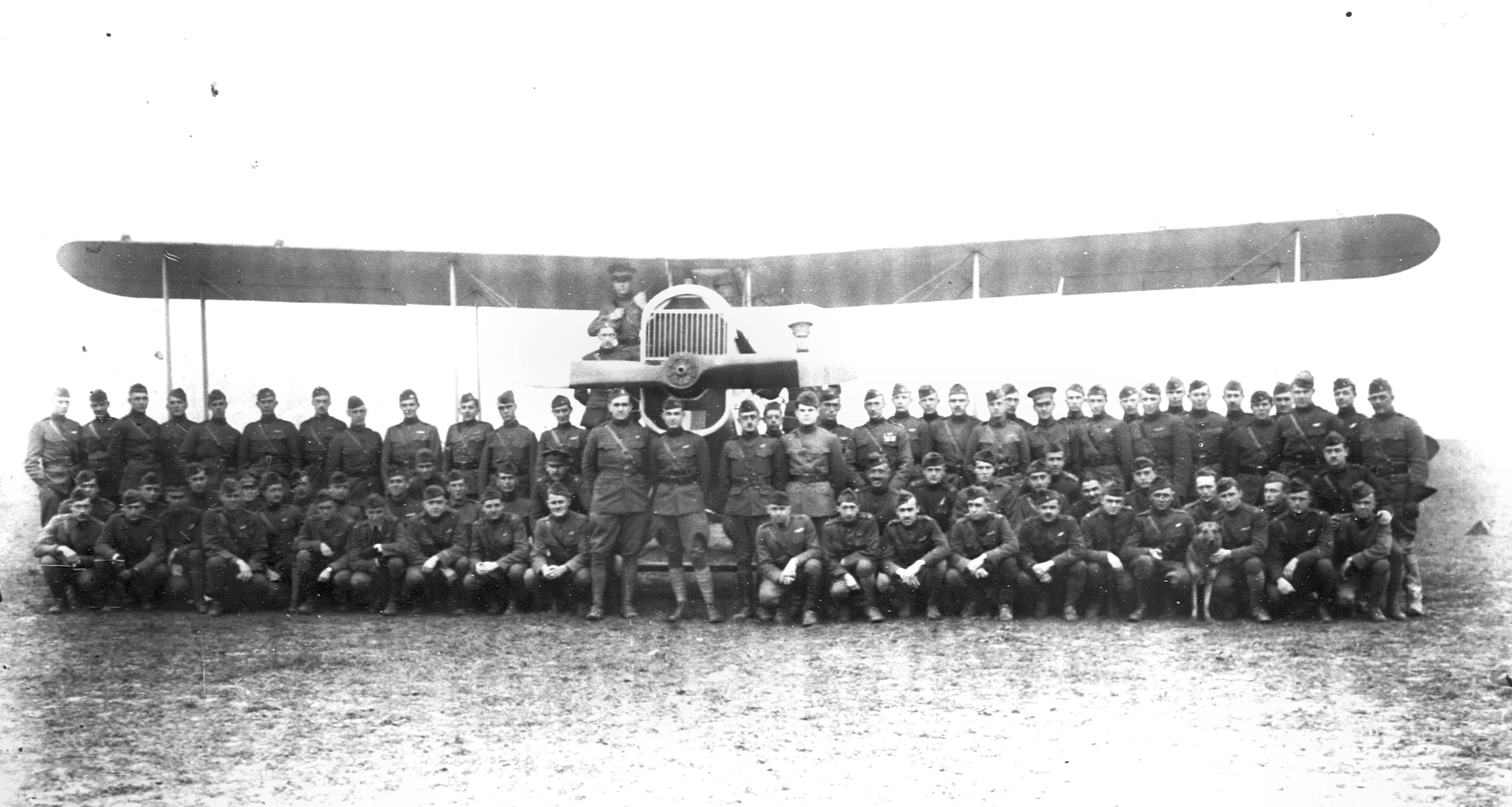
- Officers and men of the 135th Aero Squadron, November 1918, Croix de Metz Aerodrome (Toul), France
- Active: 1 July 1918 – 12 May 1919
- Country: United States
- Branch: Air Service, United States Army
- Type: Group
- Role: Command and Control
- Part of: American Expeditionary Forces (AEF)
- Engagements: World War I: St. Mihiel Offensive Campaign; Occupation of the Rhineland

Insignia
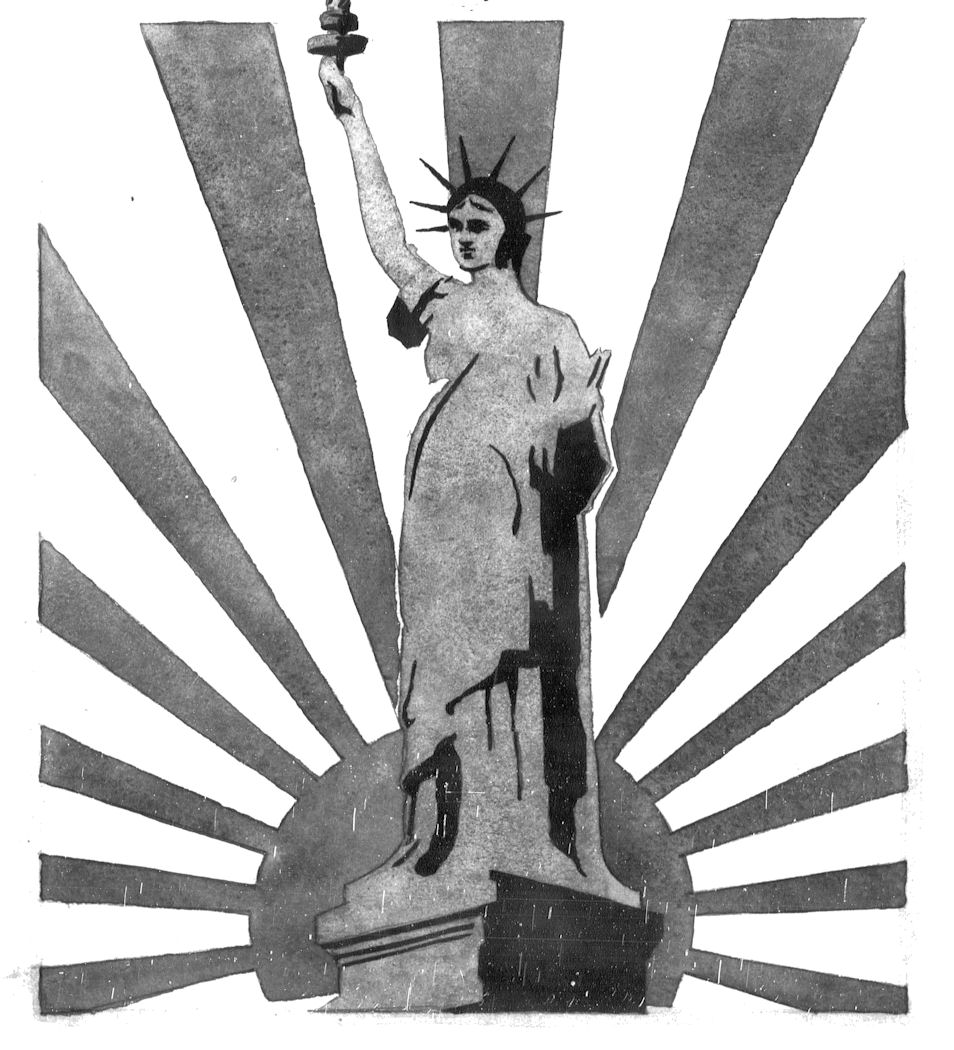
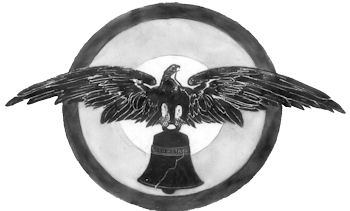
- Identification symbol: 135th Aero Squadron 8th Aero Squadron

The IV Corps Observation Group was an Air Service, United States Army unit that fought on the Western Front during World War I. It was demobilized on 12 May 1919. There is no modern United States Air Force unit that shares its lineage and history.

== History ==
=== First Army Air Service ===
The IV Corps Observation Group was formally organized on 1 July 1918 by the First Army Air Service at Ourches Aerodrome, France, although its first personnel were organized on 27 June. It was formed for the purpose of operations in the forthcoming American offensives of First Army. Its units consisted of a Headquarters Squadron, the 135th Aero Squadron, arriving at Ourches on 30 July. A second squadron, the 8th Aero Squadron, was assigned to the group on 31 August. Both squadrons were assigned to the Group from the 1st Observation Group School at Amanty Aerodrome.

The first efforts of the Group were directed towards organization and preparation for combat operations in the coming St. Mihiel Offensive. To this end, the 8th and 135th were designated as Corps Observation Squadrons whose duty it would be to make artillery adjustments, to perform photographic missions of the Corps front, and to make long distance reconnaissances together with Divisional work.

On 11 September, the day before the attack, Group headquarters moved to Ménil-la-Tour along with First Army AS Headquarters and IV Corps HQ. Throughout the attack, direct telephone communications were maintained constantly with the flying squadrons at Ourches. The group flew day observation flights over the St. Mihiel Sailent throughout the initial defensive action, then crossing the line and performing reconnaissance patrols over enemy infantry, roads and railroads while the First Army infantry was advancing. It flew observation missions over the enemy lines, taking photographic strip photos over the entire front. One of the main missions was to photograph the entire corps line front to a depth of 10 km inside enemy territory, about 600 square km.

=== Second Army Air Service ===
Headquarters remained at Ménil-la-Tour until 10 October when it moved along with IV Corps HQ to Bocq along the Belgian-French border. On 12 October, the 168th Aero Squadron, located at Croix-de-Metz Aerodrome, Toul, was assigned to the group. It was a newly organized unit and had just arrived at the front.

On 14 October 1918, the Group was relieved from First Army and transferred to the newly organized Second Army Air Service. This was to give Second Army some experienced units in preparation for the upcoming Meuse-Argonne offensive.

By this time, the front of the IV Army Corps had moved from Lake Lachaunssee to Éply. The 135th Aero Squadron was assigned to support the 28th Division and the left group of the Corps Artillery. The 8th Squadron was assigned to the right group of Corps Artillery, the 7th and 92d Divisions. The 168th was assigned to training missions in the rear to familiarize its pilots and observers with the sector. When, in the discretion of the Group Commander, they became more experienced in flying over the front, the 168th was assigned morning and evening reconnaissance patrols and was assigned to the 7th Division. It carried out artillery adjustments and destruction, special reconnaissance and photographic missions.

Each of the three squadrons also had an infantry liaison officer, who arranged for all artillery adjustments and submitted a daily report for all planned patrols by his division. He also coordinated all technical matters between and Squadron and assigned Division. During the Meuse-Argonne offensive, Group aircraft began to be equipped with bomb racks, and, along with photographic missions, began attacking enemy traffic centers, dropping leaflets, and machine-gunning enemy infantry formations.

From time to time, pilots and observers would be sent to infantry units on the line and spend two days in the trenches. A liaison school was maintained in which personnel on the line would be trained and be demonstrated contact with airplanes, and ended with an all day infantry liaison exercise, along with a battle order. The men were taught how to signal aircraft, use of flares and fireworks, and manipulation of ground panels.

Upon the formation of the VI Corps Observation Group, the 8th Aero was transferred along with the 92d Division on 23 October. On 4 November, the 85th Aero Squadron was assigned to the Group. It was initially assigned to the Manonville Aerodrome, but was moved back to Toul on 10 November. Newly organized, it flew only two missions over the line prior to the Armistice. On 10 November, the 258th Aero Squadron was assigned and moved to Manonville; however, the Armistice was announced the next day and it flew no combat missions with the Group.

=== Third Army Air Service ===
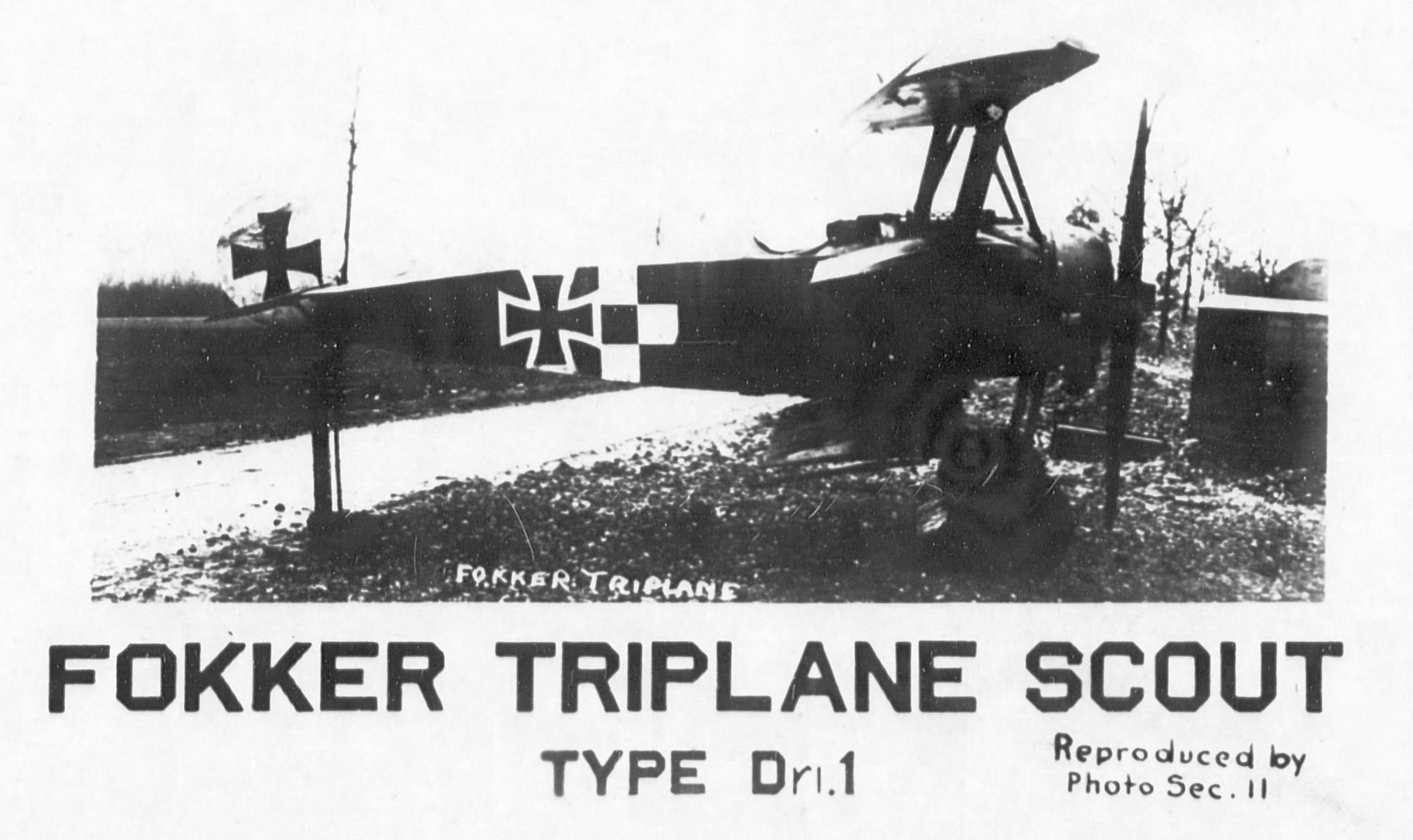
Captured Fokker Dr.I fighter at Coblenz Airfield

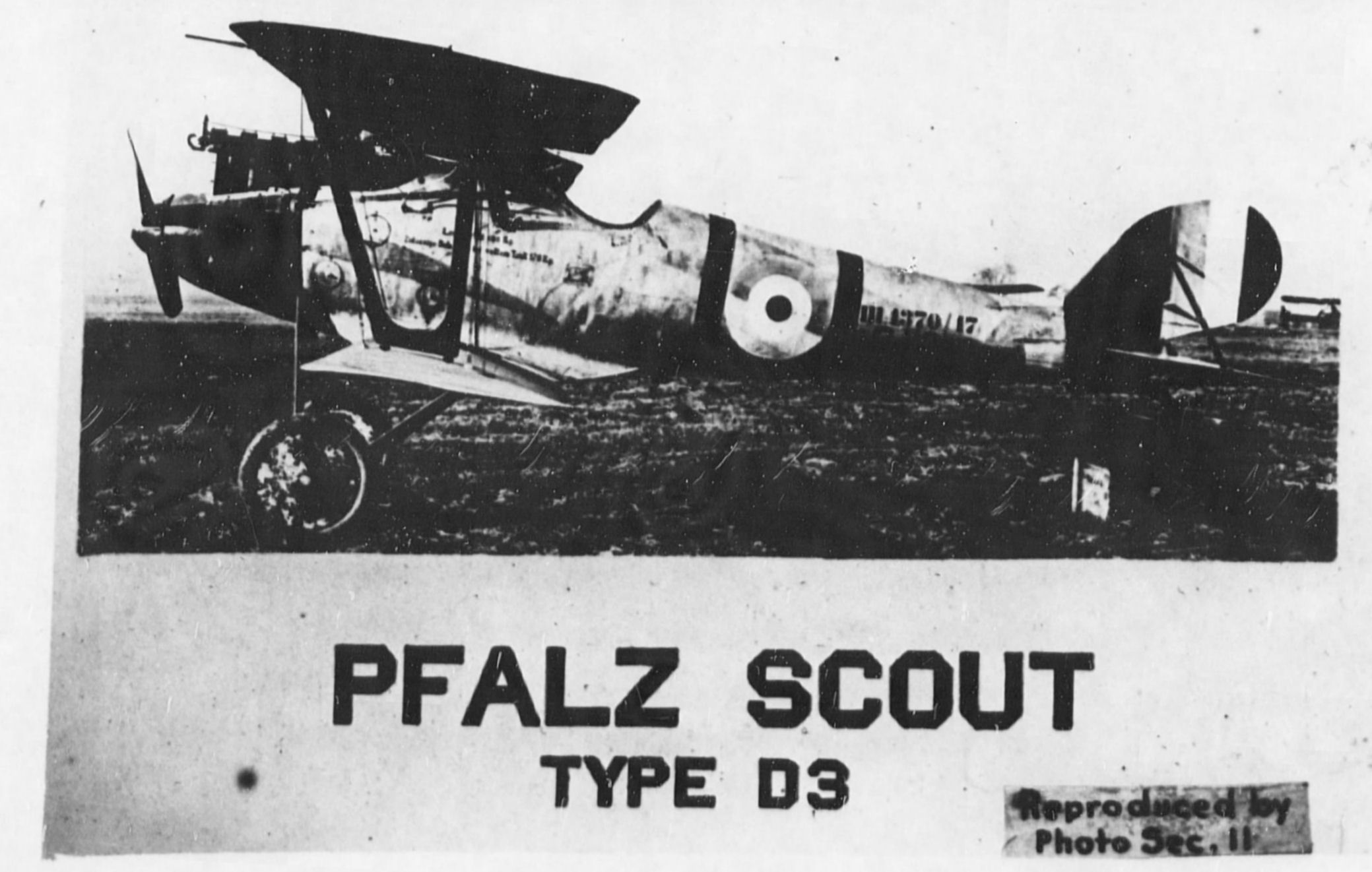
Captured Pfalz D.III fighter

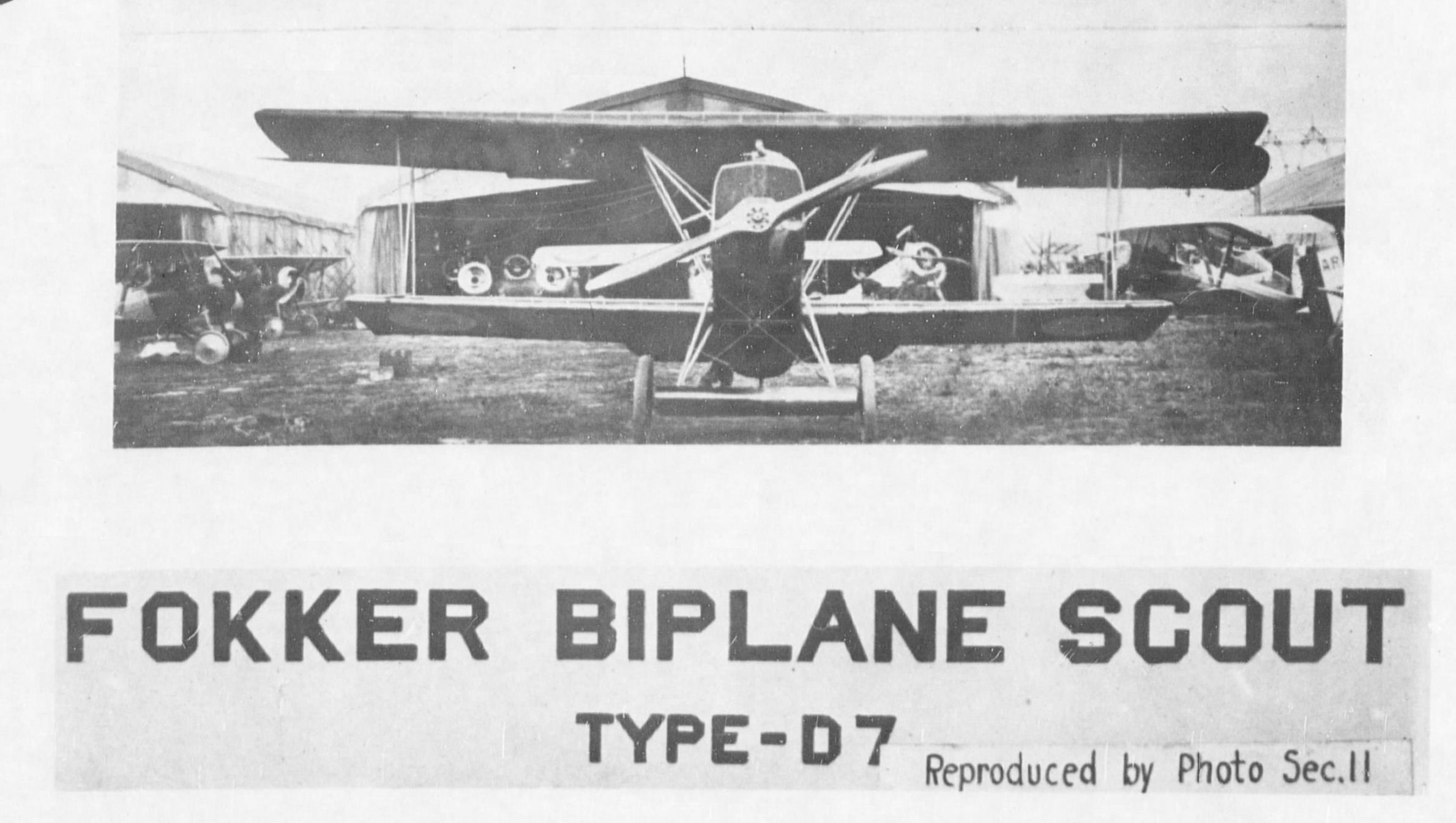
Captured Fokker D.VII fighter

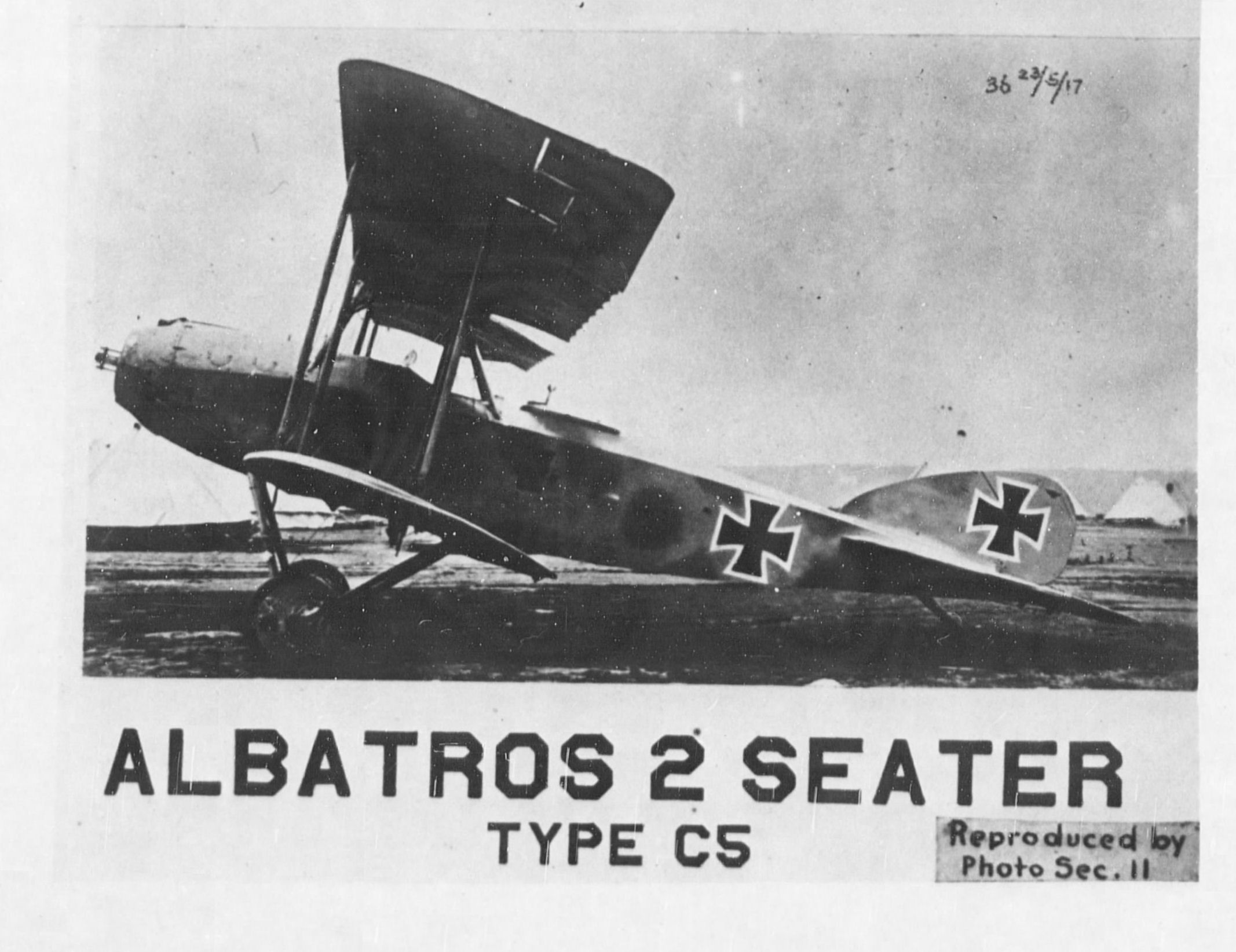
Captured Albatros C.V reconnaissance aircraft

After the Armistice with Germany and the conclusion of the war, squadron flying continued on a limited basis to keep the pilots proficient in their skills. However, the main endeavors of the Group was Army administrative paperwork. During the weeks following the signing of the Armistice, the IV Corps Observation Group was relieved from Second Army on 21 November 1918 and transferred to the new Third Army Air Service, which was assigned to the Third Army's march to the Rhine River and the Occupation of the Rhineland.

The Group was re-organized with all of its Aero squadrons being transferred to the 2d Air Instructional Center at Tours Aerodrome on 24 November. The 12th Aero Squadron was assigned to the Group for duty in Germany on 21 November. On 20 November, Corps Headquarters began the move to Germany, moving to Mercy-le-Haut, France. This town had been held for years by the Germans. On 4 December, Headquarters moved to Euren, near Trier, Germany. Corps Headquarters moved still further into Germany when orders were received to move to Coblenz on 27 December. Upon arrival, the Headquarters was assigned to Fort Kaiser Alexander for billeting and vehicle garaging, which was formerly used by the German Garrison. Offices were set up in Third Army Headquarters Building. Upon the command's arrival in Germany, an airfield was constructed on the former parade ground of Fort Kaiser Alexander for aircraft squadrons being assigned to Coblenz.

At Coblenz, the Group co-occupied the airfield with several squadrons assigned directly to Third Army Air Service. IV Corps Observation Group consisted of the Headquarters Squadron, 12th Aero Squadron, and the 4th Photo Section. The 2d Balloon Company was located remotely at Euren. The group established an infantry liaison school at Coblenz in January 1919. The mission of the school was to train infantry units in displaying panels by the front line troops, the use of pyrotechnics as employed to signal from the ground to aircraft and from the aircraft to the ground. Artillery units were trained in the use of aircraft for adjusting barrages. As many officers and non-commissioned officers as possible were taken up in airplanes to view the exercises. Radio officers were taken up to perform duties in actual exercises.

In addition, another important mission at Coblenz was the testing and evaluation of captured German aircraft. The intelligence and engineering departments analyzed their design and construction, as well as disassembling of German aircraft for evaluation. Pilots of the various squadrons at Coblenz, especially those with a background in aeronautical engineering, along with the 12th flew these aircraft and evaluated their flight characteristics and tested them for performance for strengths and weaknesses.

On 15 April 1919 the Third Air Service Squadrons at Coblenz were ordered demobilized, and the IV Corps Observation Group was ordered moved to Sinzig Aerodrome, a new base set up by Third Army. At Sinzing the Group received replacement squadrons which were transferred from Toul, those being the 85th, 278th and 354th, the 85th formerly being assigned to the Group in France. After a considerable amount of work, training re-commenced at Sinzing on 5 May 1919.

A week later, the entire Third Army Air Service, excepting that of the III Corps 138th Aero Squadron, one air park, and one construction squadron, were relieved from further duty with the Third Army on 12 May 1919, and ordered to proceed to the Services of Supply 1st Air Depot at Colombey, France, for demobilization.

Headquarters personnel were subsequently assigned to the Commanding General, Services of Supply and ordered to report to one of several staging camps in France. There, personnel awaited scheduling to report to one of the Base Ports in France for transport to the United States and subsequent demobilization and return to civilian life.

=== Lineage ===
- Organized in France as: IV Corps Observation Group, 1 July 1918

Demobilized in France on 12 May 1919

=== Assignments ===
- First Army Air Service, 1 July 1918
- Second Army Air Service, 14 October 1918
- Third Army Air Service, 21 November 1918 – 12 May 1919

=== Components ===
First Army Air Service

- 135th Aero Squadron (Corps Observation), 30 July – 14 October 1918
- 24th Aero Squadron (Corps Observation), 6–22 August 1918
- 8th Aero Squadron (Corps Observation), 31 July – 14 October 1918
- 168th Aero Squadron (Corps Observation), 12–14 October 1918

Second Army Air Service

- 135th Aero Squadron (Corps Observation), 14 October – 21 November 1918
- 8th Aero Squadron (Corps Observation), 14–23 October 1918
- 168th Aero Squadron (Corps Observation), 14 October 1918 – 21 November 1918
- 85th Aero Squadron (Corps Observation), 4–21 November 1918
- 258th Aero Squadron (Corps Observation), 10–21 November 1918
- 88th Aero Squadron (Corps Observation), 15–21 November 1918

Third Army Air Service

- 12th Aero Squadron (Corps Observation), 21 November 1918 – 15 April 1919
- 88th Aero Squadron (Corps Observation), 21 November 1918 – c. 6 December 1918
- 85th Aero Squadron (Corps Observation), 15 April 1919 – 12 May 1919
- 278th Aero Squadron (Corps Observation), 15 April 1919 – 12 May 1919
- 354th Aero Squadron (Corps Observation), 15 April 1919 – 12 May 1919

=== Stations ===
- Ourches Aerodrome, France, 1 July 1918
- Ménil-la-Tour, France, 11 September 1918
- Bocq, Belgium, 10 October 1918
- Éply, France, 14 October 1918
- Mercy-le-Haut, France, 21 November 1918
- Euren, Germany, 4 December 1918
- Coblenz Aerodrome, Fort Kaiser Alexander, Germany, 27 December 1918
- Sinzig Aerodrome, Germany, 15 April – 12 May 1919

== See also ==
- Organization of the Air Service of the American Expeditionary Force
