= Jack Currie =

Jack Currie may refer to:

- Jack Currie (Australian footballer) (1915–1974), Australian rules footballer
- Jack Currie (English footballer) (born 2001)
- Jack Currie (RAF officer) (1921–1996), officer in the Royal Air Force
- John Allister Currie (1868–1931), Ontario author, journalist and political figure

== See also ==
- John Currie (disambiguation)
