= 85th Aero Squadron =

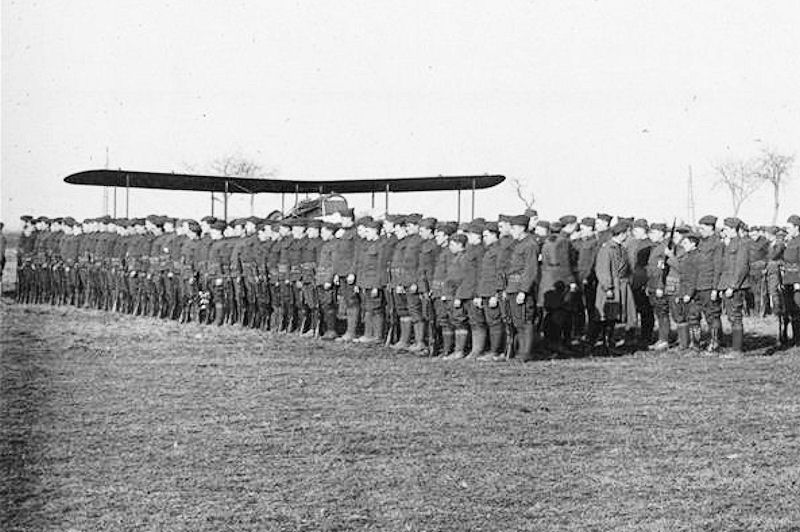
- : IV Corps Observation Group, 2d United States Army review - Croix de Metz Aerodrome (Toul), France, November 1918
- Active: 17 August 1917 – April 1919
- Country: United States
- Branch: Air Service, United States Army
- Type: Squadron
- Role: Observation
- Part of: American Expeditionary Forces (AEF)
- Engagements: World War I Occupation of the Rhineland

Commanders
- Notable commanders: Capt. Herbert A. Shaffner

Insignia
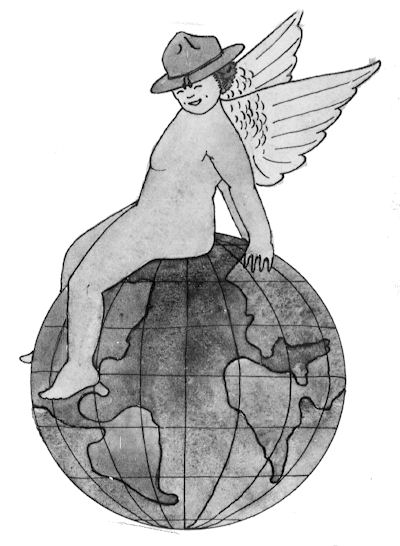
- 85th Aero Squadron Emblem

Aircraft flown
- Reconnaissance: De Haviland DH-4

Service record
- Operations: Second Army Observation Group; IV Corps Observation Group; Western Front, France: 25 October – 11 November 1918: Sorties: 4; Combat missions: 1 (10 November 1918); Personnel loss: 1

The 85th Aero Squadron was an Air Service, United States Army unit that fought on the Western Front during World War I.

Initially assigned as an Army Observation Squadron to perform long-range strategic reconnaissance behind enemy lines, it was instead designated as a Corps Observation Squadron, performing short-range, tactical reconnaissance over the VI Corps, United States Second Army sector of the Western Front in France.

The squadron saw limited combat, and with Second Army's planned offensive drive on Metz cancelled due to the 1918 Armistice with Germany, the squadron was assigned to the United States Third Army as part of the Occupation of the Rhineland in Germany. It returned to the United States in July, 1919.

There is no modern United States Air Force unit that shares its lineage and history.

== History ==
=== Origins ===
The 85th Aero Squadron was organized on 17 August 1917 at Kelly Field, San Antonio, Texas. The squadron was organized from 150 recruits, which entered the Army at Angel Island, San Francisco, California. Practically all of the recruits were from Northern California. After being processed, the squadron was transferred to Scott Field, Belleville, Illinois on 21 September. During its stay at Scott Field, the men received indoctrination training for soldiering and received initial training as aircraft mechanics.

The squadron left Scott Field on 2 February 1918, proceeding to Garden City, Long Island, New York where it was assigned to the Aviation Concentration Camp awaiting transport for overseas duty. The overseas movement to Europe was made from New York Harbor, Pier 54, with the squadron being assigned to the RMS Olympic. The ship embarked on 25 February unescorted, its speed protecting it from submarine attacks. Two German submarines were sighted but no attacks were made. The ship reached Liverpool, England, on 5 March 1918.

=== Training in England ===
The 85th disembarked the ship the next day and marched to the Liverpool railway station where a train took them to Winchester, Hampshire, on the south coast of England. Winchester was reached that evening and the squadron detrained and marched to "Winnal Down Rest Camp". A week later the squadron was moved to the "Romsey Rest Camp". On 16 March 1918, the squadron arrived at Harlaxton Aerodrome, Grantham, Lincolnshire, England for training by the Royal Flying Corps. During a stay of more than five months, the mechanics were trained in the hangars, machine shops, transport, gunnery and photography sections. Two flights of the RFC 53d Training Squadron were operated solely by the mechanics of the 85th Squadron. The record made by the squadron during its stay.

The squadron departed Harlaxton on 1 September 1918, and traveled to the Southampton docks and loaded on a boat and an uncomfortable English Channel crossing was made to Cherbourg Harbour, Lower Normandy, France, arriving on 9 September. It then proceeded to Air Service Replacement Concentration Barracks in St. Maixent, where the squadron spent two weeks, being equipped for combat on the front. The squadron arrived at Chaumont Aerodrome on 30 September for duty. At Chaumont, the squadron was assigned to the 2d Army on 25 October.

=== Combat on the Western Front ===
Orders were received to move to Croix de Metz Aerodrome, Toul, on 4 November. There, the squadron received its aircraft, four de Havilland DH-4 with Liberty engines. On 10 November 1918, the squadron made its only patrol across enemy lines, flying to the railway yards at Conflans-en-Jarnisy for visual reconnaissance. Following the armistice, the squadron suffered its only casualty, when 2d Lieutenant Richard Prod was killed in airplane crash.

==== Third Army of occupation ====
With the end of hostilities, the squadron first moved to the 2d Air Instructional Center at Tours Aerodrome on 24 November, where the squadron was called upon to cover 45 sq. miles of the Hindenburg Line with aerial photography. The squadron photographed 8 of the 11 Metz forts & photographed everything on the surface of the ground.

After the Hindenburg line was photographed, the 85th remained at Tours until the Second Army Air Service was demobilized on 15 April 1919. It then was assigned to Sinzig Airdrome, Germany to serve as part of the occupation force of the Rhineland under the Third Army Air Service, IV Corps Observation Group. One of its duties was to fly over Cologne and other parts of the Rhineland occupied by Third Army. In addition, the squadron was able to perform test flights on surrendered German aircraft. Flights of the Fokker D.VII, Pfalz D.XII, Halberstadts and Rumpler aircraft were made and evaluations were made.

==== Demobilization ====
On 13 June 1919 orders were received from Third Army for the squadron to report to the 1st Air Depot, Colombey-les-Belles Airdrome to turn in all of its supplies and equipment and was relieved from duty with the AEF. The squadron's DH-4 aircraft were delivered to the Air Service Production Center No. 2. at Romorantin Aerodrome, and there, practically all of the pilots and observers were detached from the squadron.

Personnel at Colombey were subsequently assigned to the commanding general, services of supply, and ordered to report to the staging camp at Nantes, France. There, personnel awaited scheduling to report to one of the base ports in France for transport to the United States. Upon return to the US, most squadron personnel were demobilized at Camp Mills, New York in late July 1919.

=== Lineage ===
- Organized as 85th Aero Squadron on 17 August 1917

Re-designated: 85th Aero Squadron (Observation), October 1918
Demobilized, 31 July 1919

=== Assignments ===
- Post Headquarters, Kelly Field, Texas, 17 August – 21 September 1917
- Post Headquarters, Scott Field, Illinois, 21 September 1917 – 2 February 1918
- Aviation Concentration Center, 2 February – 5 March 1918
- Air Service Headquarters, AEF, British Isles, 5 March – 9 September 1918

Attached to the Royal Flying Corps for training, 5 March – 1 September 1918

- Replacement Concentration Center, AEF, 11–30 September 1918
- Headquarters Air Service, Zone of Advance, 30 September 1918
- Second Army Observation Group, 25 October 1918
- IV Corps Observation Group, 4 November 1918
- 2d Air Instructional Center, 24 November 1918
- IV Corps Observation Group, 15 April 1919
- 1st Air Depot, 13 May 1919
- Commanding General, Services of Supply, June 1919
- Eastern Department, 20–31 July 1919.

=== Stations ===
- Kelly Field, Texas, 17 August 1917
- Scott Field, Illinois, 21 September 1917
- Aviation Concentration Center, Garden City, New York, 2 February 1918
- Port of Entry, Hoboken, New Jersey

Trans-Atlantic crossing: RMS Olympic (HMS 527), 25 February – 4 March 1918

- Liverpool, England, 5 March 1918
- Winnal Down RC, Winchester, England, 6 March 1918
- Romsey RC, Winchester, England, 13 March 1918
- Harlaxton Aerodrome, Grantham, England, 16 March 1918 – 1 September 1918
- Southampton, England, 2–8 September 1918
- Cherbourg-en-Cotentin, France, 9 September
- St. Maixent Replacement Barracks, France, 11 September 1918
- Chaumont Hill 402 Aerodrome, France, 30 September 1918
- Croix de Metz Aerodrome (Toul), France, 4 November 1918
- Tours Aerodrome, France, 24 November 1918
- Sinzig Aerodrome, Germany, 15 April 1919
- Colombey-les-Belles Airdrome, France, 13 May 1919
- Nantes, France, June, 1919
- Camp Mills, Garden City, New York, c. 20–31 July 1919

=== Enemy aircraft flown for evaluation ===
- Evaluated Fokker D.VII, Pfalz D.XII, Halberstadt and Rumpler aircraft, 1919

== See also ==
- Organization of the Air Service of the American Expeditionary Force
- List of American Aero Squadrons
