= 135th Aero Squadron =

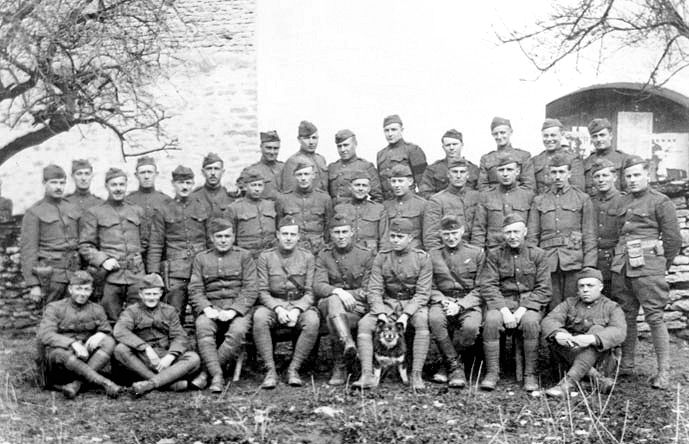
- Group photo of the 135th Aero Squadron with their famous mascot "Rin Tin Tin", Croix de Metz Aerodrome, Toul, France, November 1918
- Active: 16 June 1917 – 14 March 1921
- Country: United States
- Branch: United States Army Air Service
- Role: Corps Observation
- Size: Squadron
- Part of: American Expeditionary Forces (AEF)
- Nickname: "Liberty Squadron"
- Engagements: World War I

Commanders
- Notable commanders: Capt. Ray C Bridgeman; Lt. George W. Lindsay; Lt Henry K. Davis

Insignia
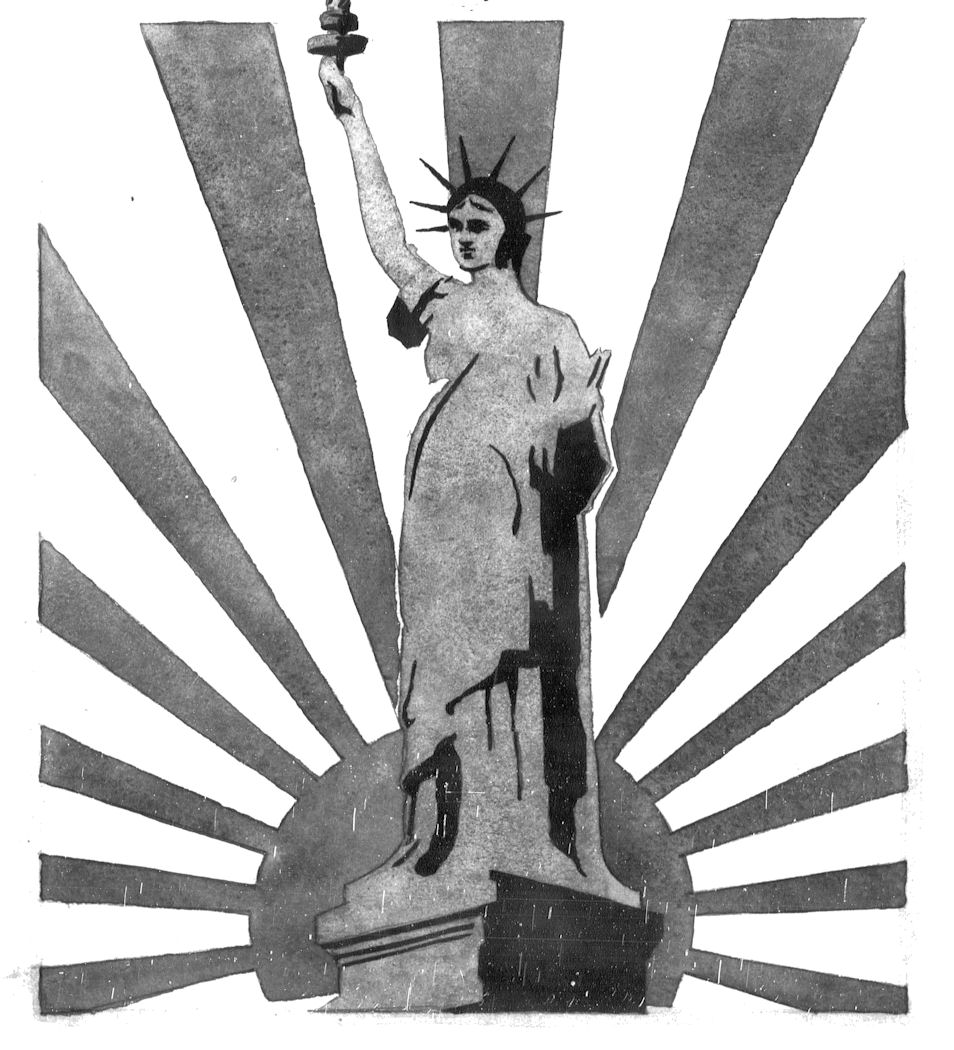
- 135th Aero Squadron Emblem

Aircraft flown
- Reconnaissance: Dayton-Wright DH-4, 1918–1919
- Trainer: Wright-Martin Model V, 1917; Curtiss Model J, 1917

Service record
- Operations: IV Corps Observation Group; Western Front, France: 28 July-11 November 1918

The 135th Aero Squadron was a United States Army Air Service unit that fought on the Western Front during World War I.

The squadron was assigned as a Corps Observation Squadron, performing short-range, tactical reconnaissance over the IV Corps, United States First Army sector of the Western Front in France, providing battlefield intelligence. In combat, the 135th was the first Air Service unit equipped with the all American made Dayton-Wright DH-4 aircraft.

IV Corps was transferred to the United States Second Army in October 1918 for a planned offensive drive on Metz which was cancelled due to the 1918 Armistice with Germany on 11 November. The squadron returned to the United States in June 1919 and became part of the permanent United States Army Air Service in 1921, being re-designated as the 22d Squadron (Observation).

The current United States Air Force unit which holds its lineage and history is the 22d Intelligence Squadron, assigned to the 707th Intelligence, Surveillance and Reconnaissance Group, Fort George G. Meade, Maryland.

== History ==
=== Origins ===
The 135th Aero Squadron was organized at Rockwell Field, near San Diego, California on 1 August 1917. It was formed from personnel transferred from the 14th and 18th Aero Squadrons, being originality designated as "Company A, 1st Aviation School, Rockwell Field". The men of the squadron began their training as aircraft mechanics on the first planes used by the United States Army. Fourteen Wright-Martin Model V and Curtiss Model J "Tractors" were used to train the first men as pilots in the Army. In fact, the first eighty-seven officers to be trained for flying were trained at Rockwell Field.

Towards the end of their training at Rockwell Field, the 135th was alerted for overseas service. After a short period, orders were received on 25 November and the squadron boarded a train bound for the Aviation Concentration Center, Long Island, New York. The squadron arrived on 1 December and was sent to Hazelhurtst Field (#2). The men, almost all being from southern California, were not used to the cold, damp weather and several became sick. On 16 December, the squadron boarded the RMS Orduna and after a delay, left for England. The overseas voyage was uneventful with the exception that the ship was diverted to arrive in Glasgow, Scotland, arriving on 31 December. Upon arrival, the squadron was sent by train south to Winchester, England, arriving on 1 January 1918.

=== Training in England ===
At the Rest Camp at Winchester (Morn Hill), the squadron was attached to the Royal Flying Corps for additional training and divided up into Flights. Flights were sent to RFC stations at Waddington, Scampton and South Carlton, the last arriving on 8 January. Training with the RFC continued until the end of June, and the squadron was re-assembled at Winchester on the 24th. Movement was made to France, arriving at Le Havre on 28 June. From the staging area at Le Havre, the squadron boarded French railway cars and moved south to the American 3d Aviation Instruction Center at Issoudun Aerodrome. However, at the 3d AIC, the squadron was assigned to petty menial tasks, until further orders were received to proceed to Amanty Airdrome, where, upon arrival the squadron was again assigned to customary Camp detail duties. On 30 July, orders were again received to move to Ourches Aerodrome where the 135th was designated as a Corps Observation squadron, assigned to the IV Corps Observation Group.

At Ourches, the squadron was equipped with American-made de Havilland DH-4s, built by Dayton-Wright and using Liberty L-12 engines. The aircraft were flown in by the pilots assigned to the squadron from the 1st Air Depot at Colombey-les-Belles Airdrome. By the end of the first week of August, the squadron received its full complement of 24 aircraft, along with the observers and pilots.

=== Combat in France ===
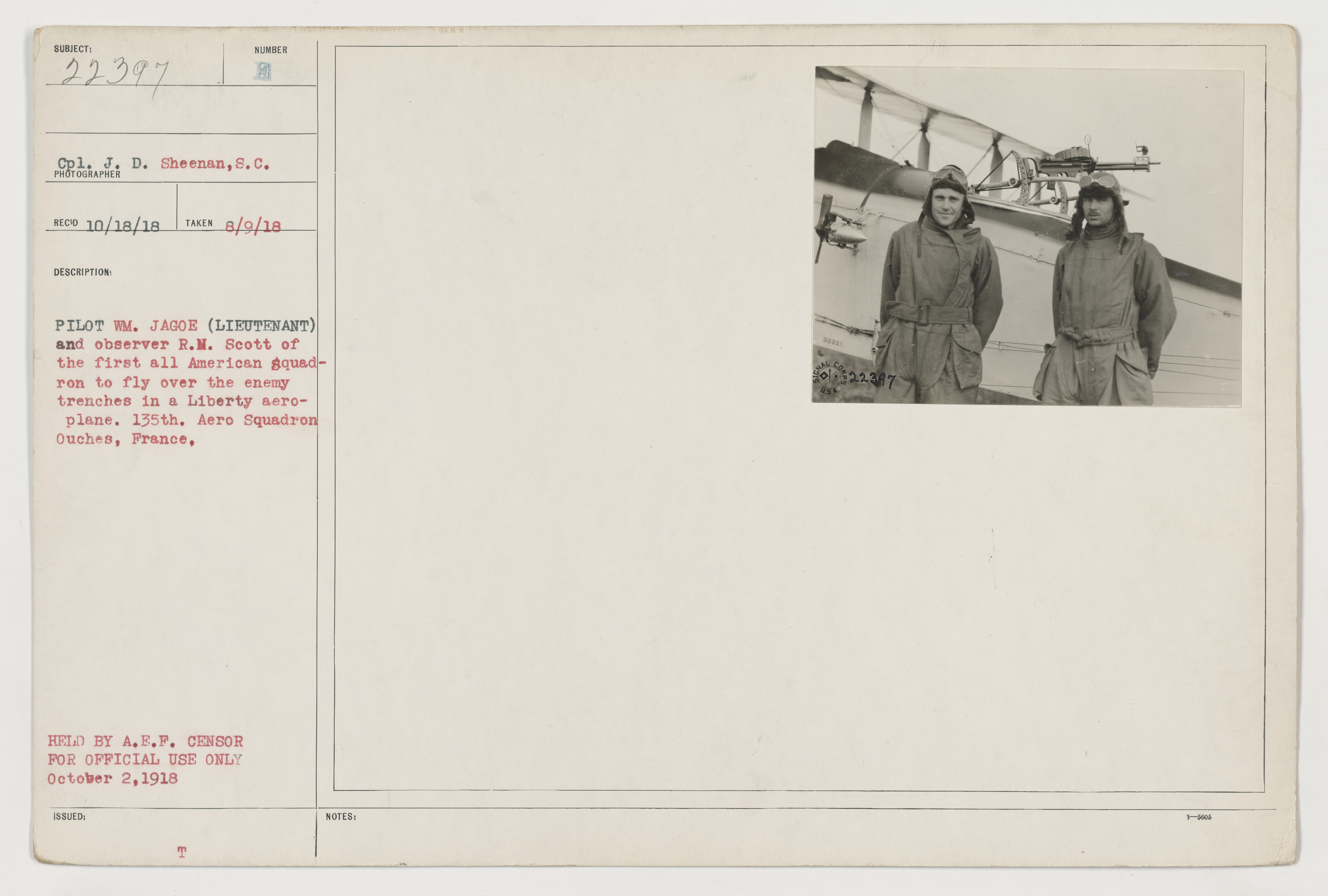
135th Aero Squadron crew Lt Pilot Wm Jagoe and observer R.M. Scott first american crew to fly over enemy trenches

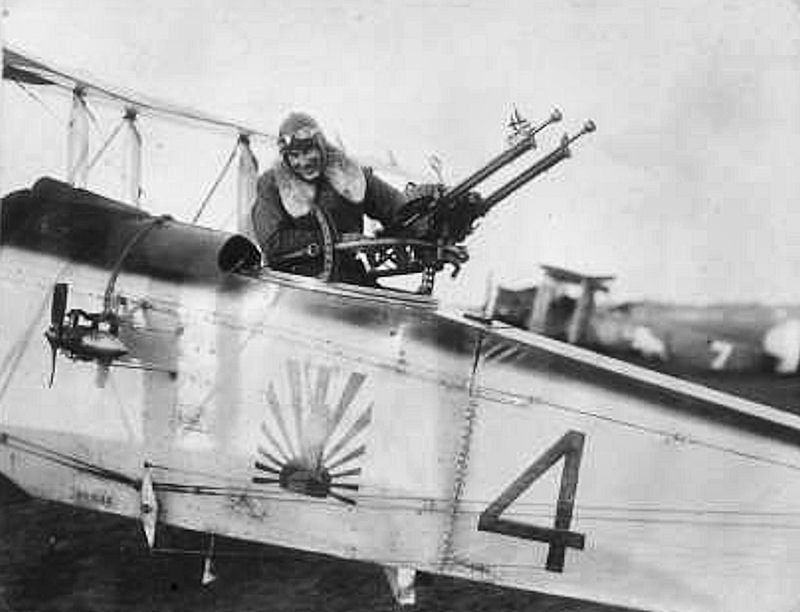
135th Aero Squadron Dayton-Wright DH-4 No 4

On 7 August, the 135th Aero Squadron flew its first mission of the war. The first sortie was quite an affair with Brigadier General Benjamin Foulois, then Chief of the Air Service, Zone of Advance, leading the formation of squadron aircraft. A motion picture operator was present to record the event. Motion pictures were taken of the 18 American planes lined up in front of the hangars. The sortie, however did not cross the line into enemy territory, for the planes flew only as far as Nancy. After about an hour, all planes returned to Amanty without any problems. For the next week or so the squadron performed subsequent missions, with no enemy aircraft being engaged, although German Anti-Aircraft Artillery hitting the planes with shrapnel.

The first combat with enemy aircraft took place on 16 August during a photographic mission across the lines. While the observer was taking photographs, the plane was attacked by a German aircraft. In the combat that ensued, the pilot was wounded three times in the leg and the aircraft fuel line was severed by a bullet causing the engine to stall. It was only the skillful piloting of the wounded pilot who managed to make an un-powered glide back across the lines. For his actions, the pilot was awarded a Distinguished Service Cross, he was taken to a hospital but re-joined the squadron later.

Initially the 135th was assigned to monitor and photograph the sector from Bouconville to Pont-à-Mousson. Just before the Battle of Saint-Mihiel attack on 12 September, the squadron was reassigned to the front of the 89th Division as well as the IV Corps Artillery, providing adjustments to the artillery as required. On the day of the attack, rain was falling and the clouds were unusually low. However operations commenced with 2d Lieutenant Bowyer as pilot and 1st Lieutenant Johnson as the observer. Due to the aircraft having to fly very low, and through the American artillery barrage, one shell struck their aircraft. The plane was instantly demolished in the air, killing both men. Subsequently, both officers were recommended for the Distinguished Service Medal.

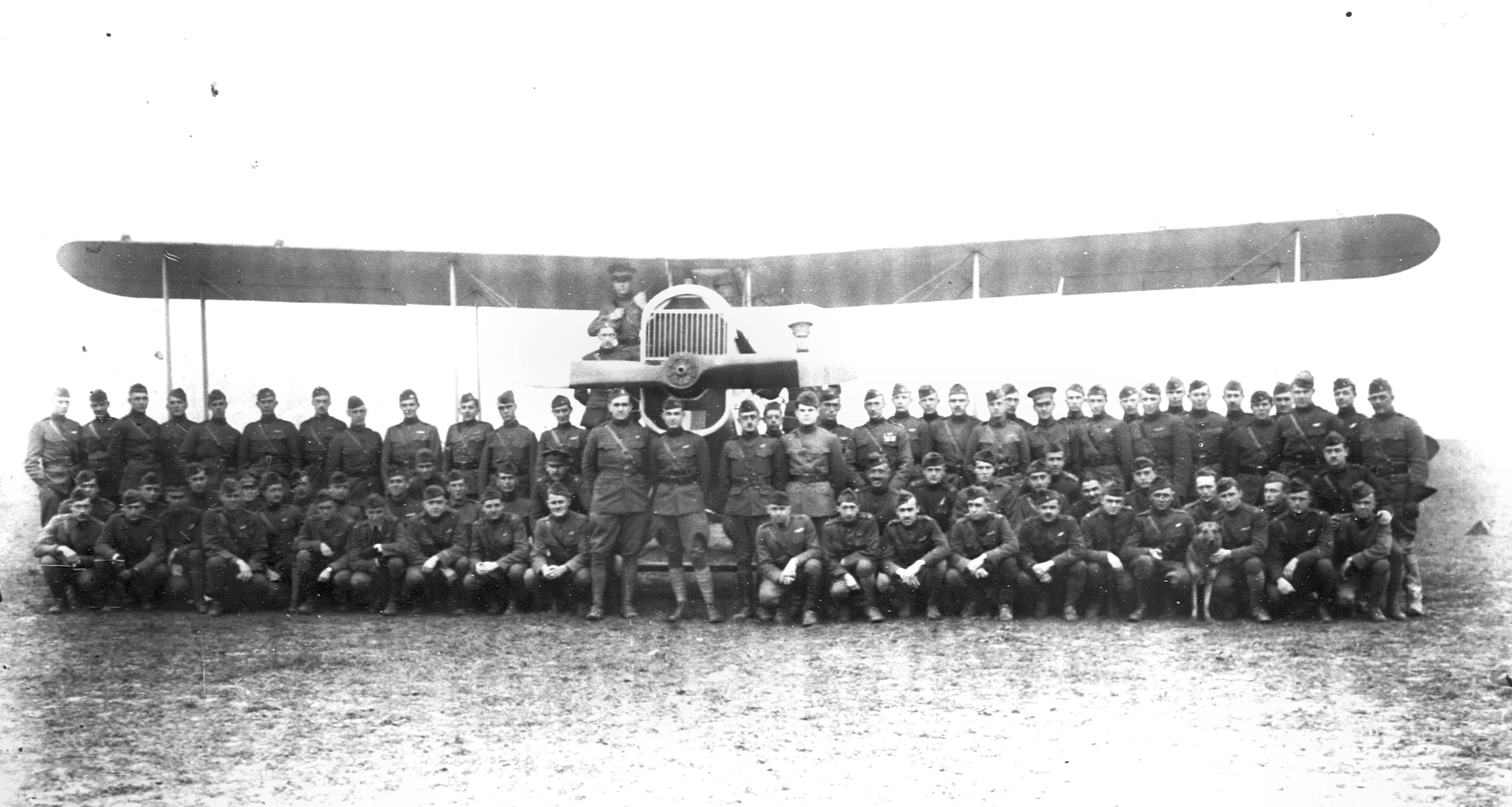
Squadron photograph after the Armistice, November 1918, Gengault Aerodrome (Toul), France

Numerous sorties and combats occurred throughout the month of September, with the squadron being shifted from one division to another, providing the commanders operational intelligence and reconnaissance photography. On 30 September, the squadron, along with the IV Corps Observation Group, moved to Croix de Metz Aerodrome, near Toul.

From Toul, mission of the most perilous nature were undertaken under difficult circumstances; however, the pilots and observers of the squadron continued to provide excellent results. Besides the work of observation and photography, the 135th made a number of bombing missions, carrying twenty pound bombs which were dropped on objectives in enemy territory. On 26 October 1918 a 135th Squadron DH-4 {observar John F. Curry} was shot down by anti-aircraft fire; Curry and his pilot escaped capture. On 3 November, the squadron flew in formation on a bombing mission over Chambley and bombed enemy targets in the town.; the same day the plane carrying Observer Curry-along with a 168th Aero Squadron aeroplane- brought down a German observation balloon.

By the time of the Armistice on 11 November, the squadron made 1,016 sorties and lost five officers in combat; two pilots and three observers. The squadron was also credited with the destruction of eight enemy aircraft in combat.

=== Demobilization ===
After the armistice, the AEF was very slow in returning its forces to the United States. The squadron remained at Toul with IV Corps Observation Group until this one was assigned to Third Army in Germany, 135 Squadron leaving for Tours, with 2nd Aviation Instruction Center. It stayed in Tours until 10 February 1919 when orders were received to report to the 1st Air Depot, Colombey-les-Belles Airdrome to turn in all of its supplies and equipment and was relieved from duty with the AEF. The squadron's DH-4 aircraft were delivered to the Air Service Production Center No. 2. at Romorantin Aerodrome, and there, practically all of the pilots and observers were detached from the squadron.

Personnel at Colombey were subsequently assigned to the commanding general, services of supply, and ordered to report to a staging camp at Tresses, France, where it remained until 18 April. There, personnel awaited scheduling to report to one of the base ports in France for transport to the United States. It then moved to the port of embarkation at Bordeaux, where it boarded a transport ship which returned them to the United States, arriving at the port of New York about 6 May.

After returning from France, most of the 135th Aero Squadron demobilized at Hazelhurst Field, Long Island, and returned to civilian life. A small cadre of the unit remained in the Air Service, and were assigned to Post Field, Oklahoma, and attached as an observation squadron, supplying aircraft for the United States Army Field Artillery School at Fort Sill and supported Army units at Fort Leavenworth, Kansas.

The 135th Aero Squadron became part of the permanent United States Army Air Service in 1921, being re-designated as the 22d Squadron (Observation).

=== Rin Tin Tin ===
Following the advances made by American troops during the Battle of Saint-Mihiel in 1918, Corporal Lee Duncan, a DH-4 gunner in the 135th A.S., was sent forward from Ourches on 15 September to the small French village of Flirey to see if it was suitable for a flying field. There Duncan found a severely damaged kennel which had once supplied the German Army with German Shepherd dogs. The only dogs left alive in the kennel were a starving mother with a litter of five nursing puppies, their eyes still shut because they were less than a week old. Duncan rescued the dogs and brought them back to the 135th Aero Squadron. He kept a male and a female. He felt that these two dogs were symbols of his good luck. He called them Rin Tin Tin and Nanette after a pair of good luck charms called Rintintin and Nénette that French children often gave to the American soldiers.

Smuggling back the dogs aboard a ship taking him back to the US at the end of the war, eventually Rin Tin Tin was discovered by Hollywood filmmakers by his ability to leap great heights at a dog show. When he died in 1932, Lee Duncan took Rin Tin Tin's body back to France, where he had him buried in a Paris cemetery, the country of his birth.

=== Lineage ===
- Organized as 135th Aero Squadron on 1 August 1917

Re-designated as: 135th Aero Squadron (Corps Observation), 19 July 1918
Re-designated as: 135th Aero Squadron, 29 May 1919
Re-designated as: 22d Squadron (Observation), 14 March 1921

=== Assignments ===
- Post Headquarters, Rockwell Field, 1 August-25 November 1917
- Aviation Concentration Center, 1–18 December 1918
- Air Service Headquarters, AEF, British Isles, 1 January 1918

Attached to the Royal Flying Corps for training, 8 January-24 June 1918

- 3d Aviation Instruction Center, 2 July 1918
- IV Corps Observation Group, 30 July 1918
- 2d Aviation Instruction Center, 21 November 1918
- 1st Air Depot, 10 February 1919
- Commanding General, Services of Supply, 23 February–April 1919
- Post Headquarters, Hazelhurst Field, 7 May 1919
- Southern Department, 29 May 1919

Attached to Field Artillery School

- VIII Corps Area, 20 August 1920

Remained attached to Field Artillery School until 30 November 1921

=== Stations ===
- Rockwell Field, California, 1 August-25 November 1917
- Aviation Concentration Center, Garden City, New York, 1–18 December 1917
- Port of Entry, Hoboken, New Jersey

Overseas Transport: RMS Orduna, 18–31 December 1917

- Glasgow, Scotland, 31 December 1917
- Winchester, England, 1 January 1918

Unit divided into flights which operated from various stations in England, including Waddington, Scampton, and South Carlton

- Winchester, England, 24 June 1918
- Le Havre, France, 28 June 1918
- Issoudun Aerodrome, France, 2 July 1918
- Amanty Airdrome, France, 19 July 1918
- Ourches Aerodrome, France, 30 July 1918
- Croix de Metz Aerodrome, Toul, France, 30 September 1918
- Tours Aerodrome, France, 21 November 1918
- Colombey-les-Belles Airdrome, France, 10 February 1919
- Tresses, France, 23 February 1919
- Bordeaux, France, 18–25 Apr 1919
- Hazelhurst Field, New York, c. 7 May 1919
- Post Field, Oklahoma, 29 May 1919

Flight at Sherman Army Airfield, Kansas, 30 Apr – 30 Jun 6 Sep-3 Nov 1920
Detachment at Maxwell Field, Alabama, after 4 November 1921

=== Combat sectors and campaigns ===
Streamer	Sector/Campaign	Dates	Notes
	Toul Sector	9 August-11 September 1918	
	St. Mihiel Offensive Campaign	12–16 September 1918	
	Toul Sector	17 September-11 November 1918	

=== Notable personnel ===
- Lt. Perry H. Aldrich, DSC, 1 aerial victory (KIA)
- Lt. William Belzer, DSC
- Lt. Otto E. Benell, DSC, 1 aerial victory
- Lt. Donald B. Cole, SSC
- Lt. Wallace Coleman, DSC, 2 aerial victories
- Chief of Staff/2nd Army Air Ser/Obs. John F. Curry, 1 aerial victory
- Lt. John J. Curtin, SSC, 1 aerial victory
- Lt. Percival G. Hart, DSC, SSC, 1 aerial victory
- Lt. Ray W. Krout, SSC
- Lt. Guy E. Morse, DSC, (KIA)
- Lt. Richard M. Scott Jr., SSC, 2 aerial victories
- Lt. Leo A. Smith, Silver Star *
  :* Award issued retroactively after 19 July 1932 when Silver Star Citation discontinued.
- Lt. Wilbur C. Suiter, DSC, SSC, (KIA)
- Rin Tin Tin

DSC: Distinguished Service Cross; SSC: Silver Star Citation; KIA: Killed in Action

== See also ==
- List of American aero squadrons
- Organization of the Air Service of the American Expeditionary Force
