= 168th Aero Squadron =

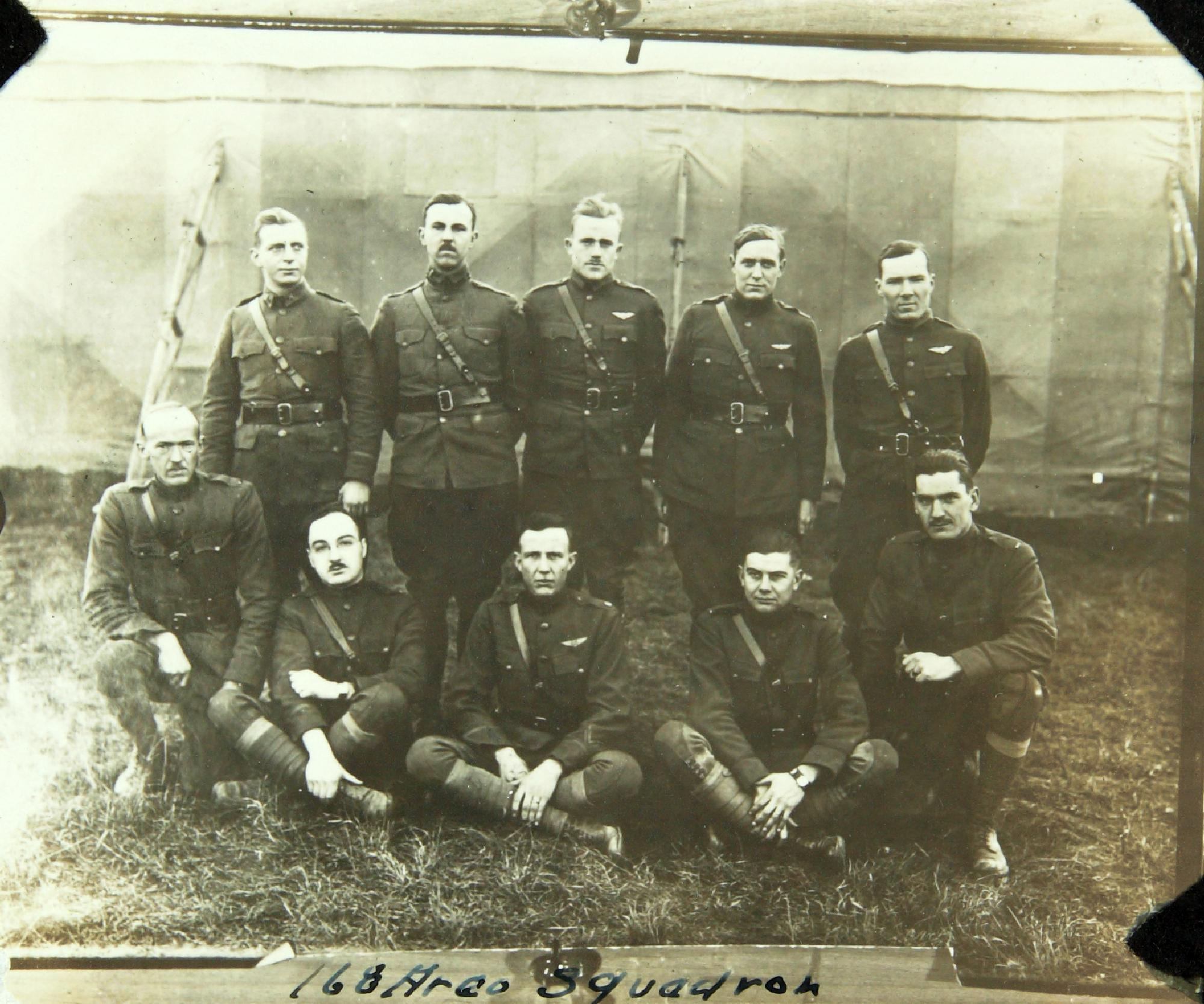
- Pilots of the 168th Aero Squadron, Croix de Metz Aerodrome (Toul), France, November 1918
- Active: 19 December 1917 – 22 July 1919
- Country: United States
- Branch: United States Army Air Service
- Type: Squadron
- Role: Corps Observation
- Part of: American Expeditionary Forces (AEF)
- Engagements: World War I Occupation of the Rhineland

Commanders
- Notable commanders: Captain Harry A. Miller Lt Frederick L. Kopff

Insignia
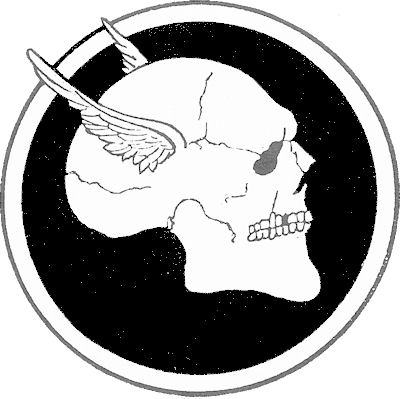
- 168th Aero Squadron Emblem

Aircraft flown
- Reconnaissance: Dayton-Wright DH-4, 1918–1919

Service record
- Operations: IV Corps Observation Group; Western Front, France: 30 September-11 November 1918: Flew first combat mission on 5 October 1918, flew one to five missions each day. First combat with enemy forces on 30 October, one enemy aircraft shot down (Lt. Myers), three other combats reported. 1 enemy balloon shot down on 3 November. Another combat reported on 5 November, Lt Myers shot down one enemy aircraft. Enemy combat again on 5 November 2 DSC's awarded.

The 168th Aero Squadron was a United States Army Air Service unit that fought on the Western Front during World War I.

The squadron was assigned as a Corps Observation Squadron, performing short-range, tactical reconnaissance over the IV Corps, United States Second Army sector of the Western Front in France, providing battlefield intelligence.

The squadron saw limited combat, and with Second Army's planned offensive drive on Metz cancelled due to the 1918 Armistice with Germany, the squadron was assigned to the United States Third Army as part of the Occupation of the Rhineland in Germany. The squadron returned to the United States in July 1919 and was demobilized.

The squadron was never reactivated and there is no current United States Air Force or Air National Guard successor unit.

== History ==
=== Origins ===
The 168th Aero Squadron was organized on 12 December 1917 at Kelly Field, Texas, with 154 recruits being assigned to the squadron on the 19th. The squadron began a program of drill and indoctrination into the Air Service. On 18 December, the squadron was ordered to report to the Aviation Concentration Center, Hazelhurst Field, Long Island, and arrived on 26 December for overseas duty. There, about 60 members of the squadron were placed in training schools for three weeks while the remainder performed guard duty and camp maintenance duty.

On 31 January 1918, the squadron was ordered to report to the United States Port of Entry, Hoboken, New Jersey and boarded HMS Adriatic. The crossing of the Atlantic was uneventful, Adriatic being in a convoy of 14 ships, arriving at Liverpool, England on 16 Funerary. From Liverpool, the squadron traveled by train to the Ramsey Rest Camp, Winchester.

=== Training in England ===
After spending 11 days at Ramsey, the 168th was assigned to the Royal Flying Corps (RFC) for training. The squadron was divided into four flights, A, B, C, and D. A and B Flights were sent to RFC Tedcester in Yorkshire and C and D Flights were sent to RFC Doncester, also in Yorkshire to be trained by the British in aircraft assembly, engine repair, motor vehicles and other aspects of operating a combat squadron on the front. After five months of training, the squadron was re-assembled at Flower Down Rest Camp, Winchester on 7 August 1918. A final inspection there was made, and preparations were made for the squadron to be sent into combat in France.

On 11 August, orders were received for the 168th to proceed to the Air Service Replacement Concentration Center, St. Maixent Replacement Barracks in France. The squadron first went to Southampton for the cross-channel trip to Le Havre, reaching St. Maixent on 14 August where the 168th was classified as a Corps Observation squadron. From there, the squadron proceeded to the Air Service Production Center No. 2., Romorantin Aerodrome, on 19 August where the squadron received Dayton-Wright DH-4 aircraft. The next stop on the journey to the front lines was to the 1st Air Depot at Colombey-les-Belles Airdrome on 26 August where the men of the squadron were fully equipped and given gas mask training. Next, on 2 September, a move was made to Autreville Airdrome where for the next five weeks, the squadron trained on the DH-4s and performed camp duties.

=== Toul Sector ===
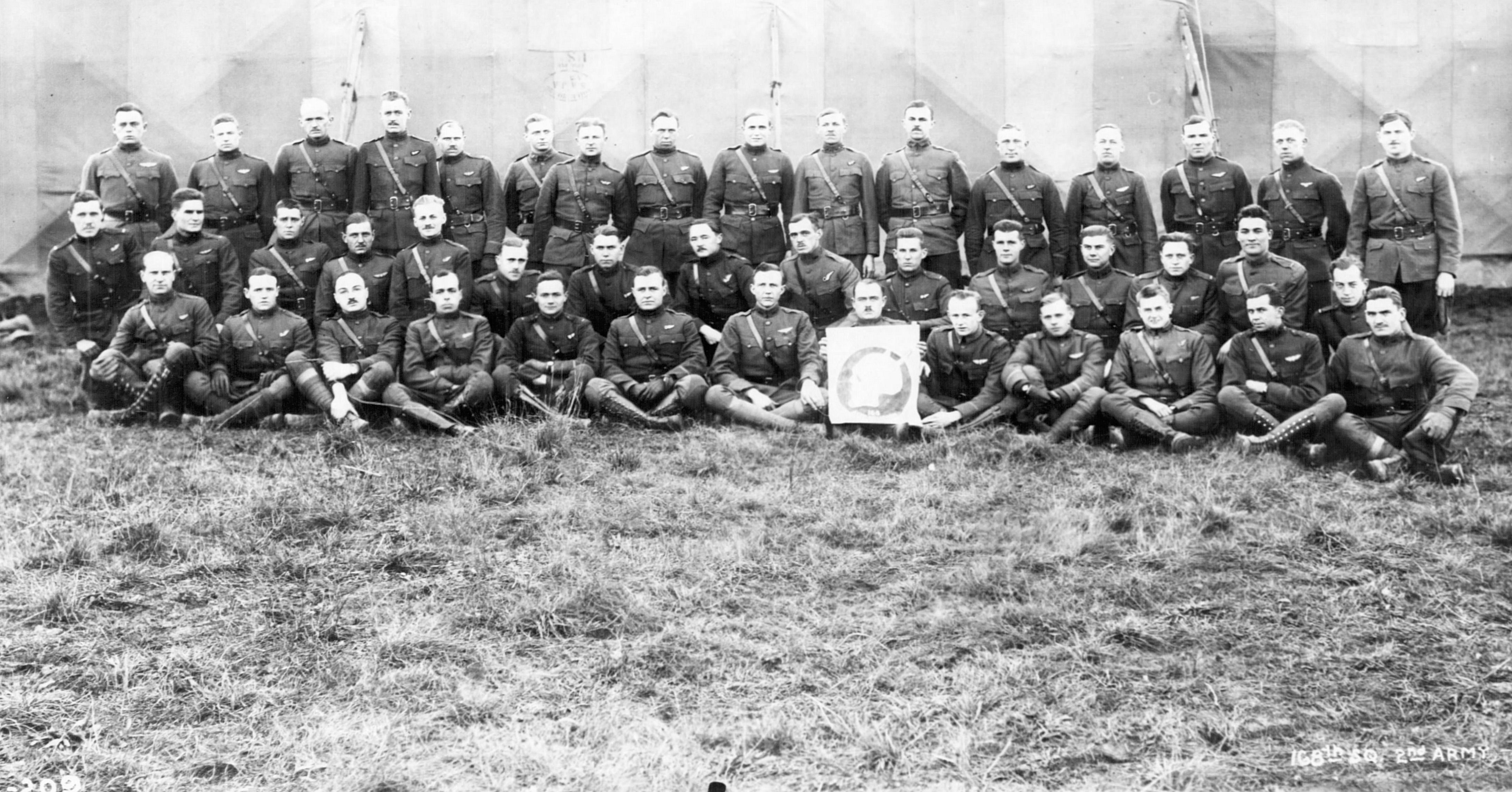
Pilots of the 168th Aero Squadron at Toul, November 1918

Finally, on 5 October, the 168th moved to Croix de Metz Aerodrome, near Toul, where the squadron was assigned to the IV Corps Observation Group, Second Army and immediately began preparations for active combat service. Initially, the squadron flew patrols with the 8th Aero Squadron, acting as protection for their planes and also enabling the pilots to acquaint themselves with the Toul Sector. Beginning on 12 October, the 168th formally took over the observation area for the 7th Infantry Division and began flying combat observation missions. The squadron flew about ten sorties per day, with a few exceptions when weather limited operations.

During the first few days of active flying, the squadron did not encounter any enemy aircraft. However, by 30 October, the sky was full of enemy Fokkers, generally found in groups of five to seven. On that day, Lieutenants Myers and McCollough with Lieutenants White and Bruett as protection were attacked by a group of five enemy aircraft. One of the enemy aircraft managed to get on the tail of one of the protection aircraft but Lt. Myers placed his aircraft in a position which enabled Lt. McCollough to shoot it down. On the same day, three other combats were reported. After that day, each mission was met and attacked by Enemy Aircraft.

On 3 November, a squadron plane on a photo-reconnaissance mission passed near an enemy observation balloon and fired on it. As luck would have it, the squadron had just received a supply of incendiary bullets which had been loaded in the aircraft's machine guns. By good shooting the balloon was hit and set on fire. A shared credit of the downing of this ballon was with a 135th Aero Squadron plane {Observer John F. Curry}

Up until the Armistice on 11 November, the squadron flew observation, artillery adjustment and photo-reconnaissance missions to support the 7th Division as they advanced. During the combat the squadron was engaged in, two Distinguished Service Crosses, were awarded to Lieutenant Pandell and Lieutenant Armstrong, both on 4 November for flying extremely hazardous missions over enemy territory.

=== Third Army of Occupation ===
With the end of hostilities, the squadron first moved to the 2d Air Instructional Center at Tours Aerodrome on 24 November, where the squadron was called upon to cover 45 sq. miles of the Hindenburg Line with aerial photography. The squadron photographed 8 of the 11 Metz forts & photographed everything on the surface of the ground.

After the Hindenburg line was photographed, the 168th was then assigned to Weißenthurm Airdrome, Germany to serve as part of the occupation force of the Rhineland under the Third Army Air Service, III Corps Observation Group. There, the squadron was able to perform test flights on surrendered German aircraft. Flights of the Fokker D.VII, Pfalz D.XII, Halberstadts and Rumpler aircraft were made and evaluations were made.

=== Demobilization ===
On 18 June 1919, orders were received from Third Army for the squadron to report to the 1st Air Depot, Colombey-les-Belles Airdrome to turn in all of its supplies and equipment and was relieved from duty with the AEF. The squadron's planes were delivered to the Air Service Production Center No. 2. at Romorantin Aerodrome, and there, practically all of the pilots and observers were detached from the squadron.

Personnel were subsequently assigned to the commanding general, services of supply, and ordered to report to one of several staging camps in France. There, personnel awaited scheduling to report to one of the base ports in France for transport to the United States. The squadron arrived at Camp Mills, New York in late July 1919. There most of the men returned to civilian life, being discharged from Army service.

=== Lineage ===
- Organized as 168th Aero Squadron, on 12 December 1917

Re-designated: 168th Aero Squadron (Corps Observation), on 14 August 1918
Demobilized on 22 July 1919

=== Assignments ===
- Post Headquarters, Kelly Field, 12 December 1917
- Aviation Concentration Center, 26 December 1917
- Air Service Headquarters, AEF, British Isles

Attached to the Royal Flying Corps for training, 16 February – 11 August 1918

- Air Service Replacement Concentration Center, 14 August 1918
- Air Service Production Center No. 2., 19 August 1918
- 1st Air Depot, 26 August 1918
- IV Corps Observation Group, 12 October 1918
- 2d Air Instructional Center, 24 November 1918
- III Corps Observation Group, 15 April 1919
- 1st Air Depot, 12 May 1919
- Commanding General, Services of Supply, May–June 1919
- Eastern Department, July 1919

=== Stations ===
- Kelly Field, Texas, 12 December 1917
- Aviation Concentration Center, Garden City, New York, 26 December 1917
- Port of Entry, Hoboken, New Jersey

Overseas transport: RMS Adriatic, 31 January – 16 February 1918

- Liverpool, England, 16 February
- Ramsey Rest Camp, Winchester, England, 17 February 1918

Squadron divided into flights for training:

A&B Flight to RFC Tedcester; C&D Flight to RFC Doncester

- Flower Down Rest Camp, Winchester, England, 7 August 1918
- St. Maixent Replacement Barracks, France, 14 August 1918
- Romorantin Aerodrome, France, 19 August 1918
- Colombey-les-Belles Airdrome, France, 26 August 1918
- Autreville Airdrome, France, 2 September 1918
- Croix de Metz Aerodrome, Toul, France, 5 October 1918
- Tours Aerodrome, France, 24 November 1918
- Weißenthurm Airdrome, Germany, 15 April 1919
- Colombey-les-Belles Airdrome, France, 12 May 1919
- France, May–July 1919
- Camp Mills, New York, c 15–22 July 1919

=== Enemy aircraft flown for evaluation ===
- Evaluated Fokker D.VII, Pfalz D.XII, Halberstadt and Rumpler aircraft, 1919

=== Combat sectors and campaigns ===
Streamer	Sector/Campaign	Dates	Notes
	Toul Sector	12 October – 11 November 1918	

=== Notable personnel ===
- Lt. Rodney M. Armstrong, DSC
- Lt. Elmer Pendell, DSC
- 2nd Lt Barney M. Giles

DSC: Distinguished Service Cross

== See also ==
- List of American aero squadrons
- Organization of the Air Service of the American Expeditionary Force
