= John Curry (disambiguation) =

John Curry (1949–1994) was a British figure skater.

John Curry may also refer to:

- John Curry (American football) (born 2005), American football player
- John Curry (historian) (died 1780), Irish physician
- John Curry (ice hockey) (born 1984), American ice hockey goaltender
- John Curry (tennis administrator) (1938–2024), British tennis administrator and businessman
- John A. Curry (1934–2023), president of Northeastern University, Boston, 1989–1996
- John F. Curry (1886–1973), U.S. Army Air Corps major-general
- John Steuart Curry (1897–1946), American painter
- John W. Curry (died 1899), first African-American letter carrier in the United States Post Office

== See also ==
- John Currie (disambiguation)
- John Currey (1814–1912), judge
- Jack Curry (born 1964), American sportswriter
