= John Currie =

John Currie may refer to:

- John Currie (Scottish architect) (1839–1922), Scottish architect
- John Currie (New Zealand architect) (c. 1851–1921), New Zealand architect
- John Currie (artist) (c. 1884–1914), English artist
- John Currie (cross-country skier) (1910–1989), Canadian Olympic skier
- John Currie (footballer, born 1921) (1921–1984), English football player
- John Currie (footballer, born 1939) (1939–2005), Scottish football player
- John Currie (soccer), American soccer player
- John Currie (Australian footballer) (1931–1997), Australian rules footballer
- John Currie (sportsman) (1932–1990), British rugby union player and cricketer
- John Allister Currie (1862–1931), Canadian author, journalist and political figure
- John Cecil Currie (1898–1944), British Army officer during World War II
- John Lang Currie (1818–1898), Australian pastoralist
- John S. Currie (1877–1956), Canadian politician and journalist
- John Currie Gunn (1916–2002), Scottish scientist
- John Currie (athletic director) (born 1971), athletic director at Wake Forest University
- John Currie (minister) (c.1670–1720), Church of Scotland minister

== See also ==
- John Curry (disambiguation)
