= John F. Curry =

United States Army Air Forces general

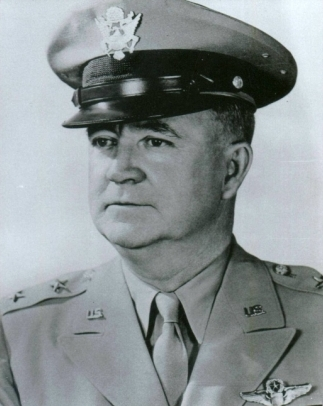
- Born: John Francis Curry; April 22, 1886; New York City, New York
- Died: March 4, 1973 (aged 86); Colorado
- Burial place: Fort Logan National Cemetery
- Military career
- Allegiance: United States
- Branch: United States Army Air Forces
- Service years: 1904–1945
- Rank: Major General
- Service number: 0-2353
- Commands: Ellington Field Bombing School, Commandant, Air Corps Tactical School, Maxwell Field, Al, Commanding Officer of Hamilton Field, Ca, Commanding General, Northwest Air District and Second Air Force, Spokane, Wash
- Conflicts: Pancho Villa Expedition; World War I World War II
- Awards: Distinguished Service Medal; Legion of Merit; Legion of Honor; Ordre de l'Étoile Noire
- Other work: National Commander, Civil Air Patrol

Major General John Francis Curry (April 22, 1886 – March 4, 1973) was the first national commander of the Civil Air Patrol, the United States Air Force Auxiliary. He was also a major general in the United States Army Air Corps.

== Biography ==
Curry, a 1908 West Point graduate, had learned to fly in time to accompany General John J. Pershing's expedition to Mexico. Later, during World War I, he served as Chief of Staff of the Air Service of the Second Army in France, under Col. Frank P. Lahm. On October 26, 1918, while serving as an observer in a 135th Aero Squadron airplane, the DH-4 was shot down by the anti-aircraft fire; he and his pilot escaped capture. On November 3, 1918, while still serving as an observer, his plane-along with an aircraft of the 168th Aero Squadron-destroyed a German observation balloon. Curry served as the fourth and final commander of Air Force Life Cycle Management Center predecessor, the Army Air Service Engineering Division at McCook Field in Dayton, Ohio, from 1924 to 1927.

In late 1941, civilian pilots were interested in assisting the U.S. military. However, in Washington, D.C., those in authority scoffed at the idea that a group of non-military aviators could provide such assistance. Despite these misgivings, the Civil Air Patrol was formed as a part of the United States' home defense needs. Curry, an Army Air Corps officer, was selected as its first national commander. As such, he was the nation's only acting general in command of a civilian army. He served in this capacity from December 1941 to March 1942.

Founded as a volunteer organization, the Civil Air Patrol conducted patrols over coastal waters in search of enemy submarines and naval activity. As it was not a government-sponsored plan to provide free flight training, each individual had to pay for their own flying time.

Part of the reason for the founding of the Civil Air Patrol was to keep aviation from being put aside entirely during the war. As Gen. Curry stated, "Without such a plan [as Civil Air Patrol], there might be no private aviation for the duration of the war; with such a plan, there is a chance that private flying may continue and develop." Under Curry's guidance, wings were formed in every state. He helped mobilize 100,000 private pilots for non-combatant service; thus freeing military pilots for wartime duty.

There was no discrimination because of one's gender. Individual ability, experience, and records were the main criteria for selection. In Curry's words, "There must be no doubt in the minds of our gallant women fliers that they are needed and, in my opinion, indispensable to the complete success of the Civil Air Patrol organization. A great part of the progress made in organizing civilian aviation under Civil Air Patrol has been due to the volunteer help given by women flyers." Although he only served a few months as national commander, Gen. Curry's organizational skills were influential in determining the future growth of the Civil Air Patrol.

Originally, the Civil Air Patrol was allowed to prove itself for a 90-day test period. Success in deterring German U-boat attacks on merchant's vessels encouraged the USAAF and USN to support the Civil Air Patrol's coastal patrol mission, among others. After the end of World War II, the Civil Air Patrol continued to serve the nation in the performance of dangerous missions. The Colorado Wing, Civil Air Patrol, and Colorado State Director of Aeronautics headed now by retired Maj. Gen. John F. Curry conducted light plane surveys through rugged Colorado Rocky Mountains. Where more than 50 peaks have an elevation of greater than 14,000 feet (4,300 m), scores of flying individuals lost their lives due to unpredictable winds. As a result of Curry's direction, maps of safe flying routes were developed by Colorado Civil Air Patrol personnel.

The first Civil Air Patrol cadet achievement, the General J. F. Curry Achievement, is named in his honor.

== Decorations ==

USAF Command Pilot wings
1st Row	Army Distinguished Service Medal	Legion of Merit	Cuban Pacification Medal (Army)	Mexican Service Medal
2nd Row	World War I Victory Medal	Army of Occupation of Germany Medal	American Defense Service Medal	American Campaign Medal
3rd Row	Asiatic-Pacific Campaign Medal with one service star	World War II Victory Medal	Officier of the Legion of Honor (France)	Officer of the Ordre de l'Étoile Noire (France)

== Sources ==
- Leadership: 2000 and Beyond. Vol. I (Second ed.). Civil Air Patrol. June 2004.
- John F. Curry at Generals.dk
