= Jack Currie (Australian footballer) =

Australian rules footballer, born 1915

Personal information
- Full name: John Francis Currie
- Born: 22 December 1915; Richmond, Victoria
- Died: 11 July 1974 (aged 58); Kensington, Victoria
- Original team: Richmond All Blacks
- Height: 175 cm (5 ft 9 in)
- Weight: 71 kg (157 lb)

Playing career^{1}
Years	Club	Games (Goals)
1939	Richmond	6 (0)
- ^{1} Playing statistics correct to the end of 1939.

John Francis Currie (22 December 1915 – 11 July 1974) was an Australian rules footballer who played with Richmond in the Victorian Football League (VFL).
