= Ménil-la-Tour =

- Commune
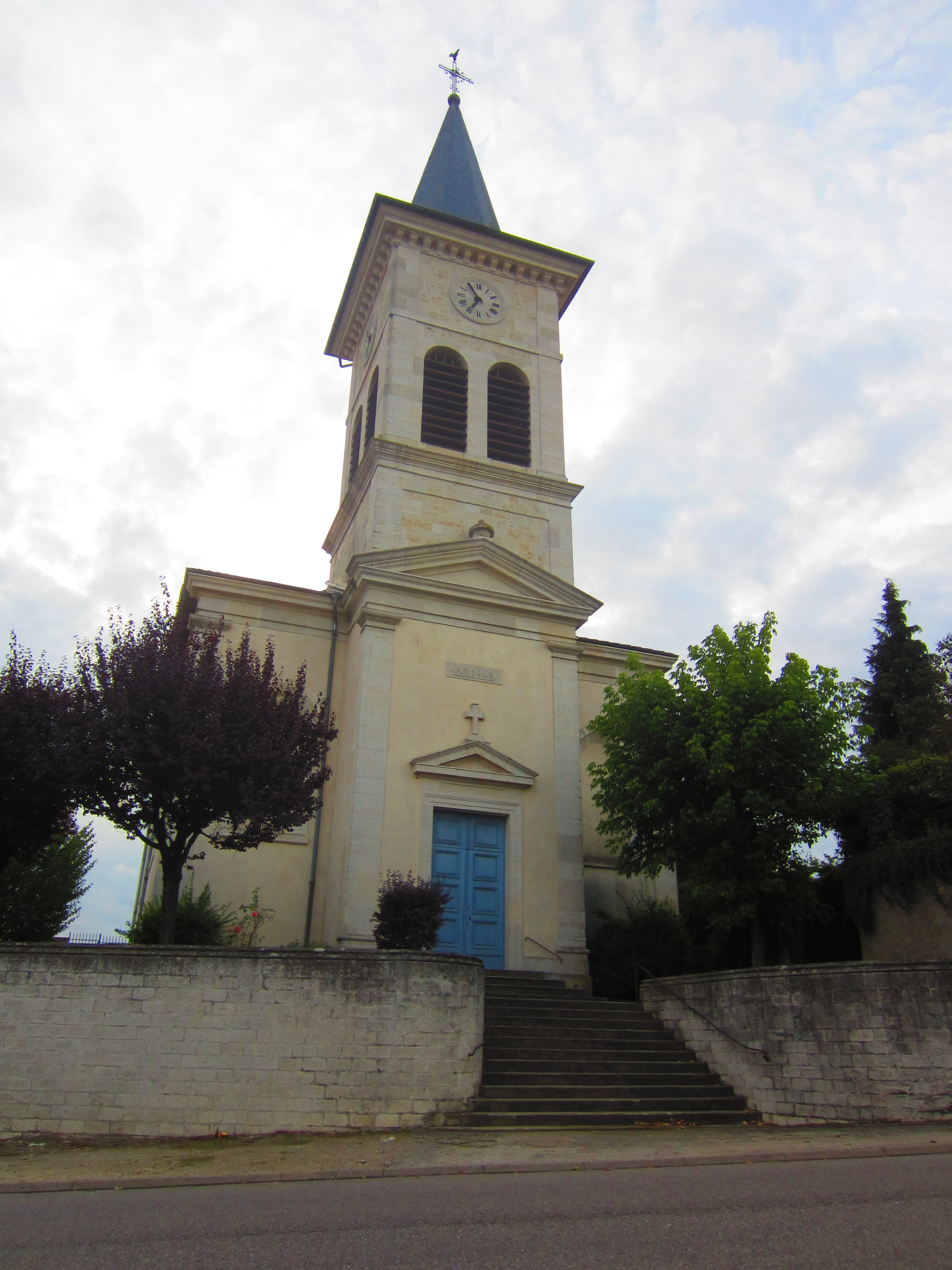
- The church in Ménil-la-Tour

- Coat of arms
- Location of Ménil-la-Tour
- Location within France Location within Grand Est
- Coordinates: 48°46′00″N 5°51′51″E
- Country: France
- Region: Grand Est
- Department: Meurthe-et-Moselle
- Arrondissement: Toul
- Canton: Le Nord-Toulois
- Intercommunality: Terres Touloises

Government
  - Mayor (2020–2026): Bernard Depaillat
- Area^{1}: 8.82 km^{2} (3.41 sq mi)
- Elevation: 225 m (738 ft)
- Highest elevation: 252 m (827 ft)
- Lowest elevation: 221 m (725 ft)
- Population (2023): 342
  - Density: 38.8/km^{2} (100/sq mi)
- Time zone: UTC+01:00 (CET)
  - Summer (DST): UTC+02:00 (CEST)
- INSEE/Postal code: 54360 /54200
- ^{1} French Land Register data, which excludes lakes, ponds, glaciers > 1 km^{2} (0.386 sq mi or 247 acres) and river estuaries.

Ménil-la-Tour (French pronunciation: [menil la tuʁ]) is a commune in the Meurthe-et-Moselle department in north-eastern France.

== See also ==
- Communes of the Meurthe-et-Moselle department
- Parc naturel régional de Lorraine
