= John Currie (soccer) =

American soccer player

International career
Years	Team	Apps	(Gls)
1937	United States MNT	2	(0)

John Currie was a U.S. soccer player who earned two caps with the U.S. national team in 1937. His first game with the national team in a 7–2 loss to Mexico on September 12, 1937. His second game was two weeks later, a 7–3 loss to Mexico.
