= Toul-Croix de Metz Airfield =

Former French military airfield

Toul-Croix De Metz Airfield Advanced Landing Ground (ALG) A-90 Gengoult Aerodrome
- Lorraine Region, France
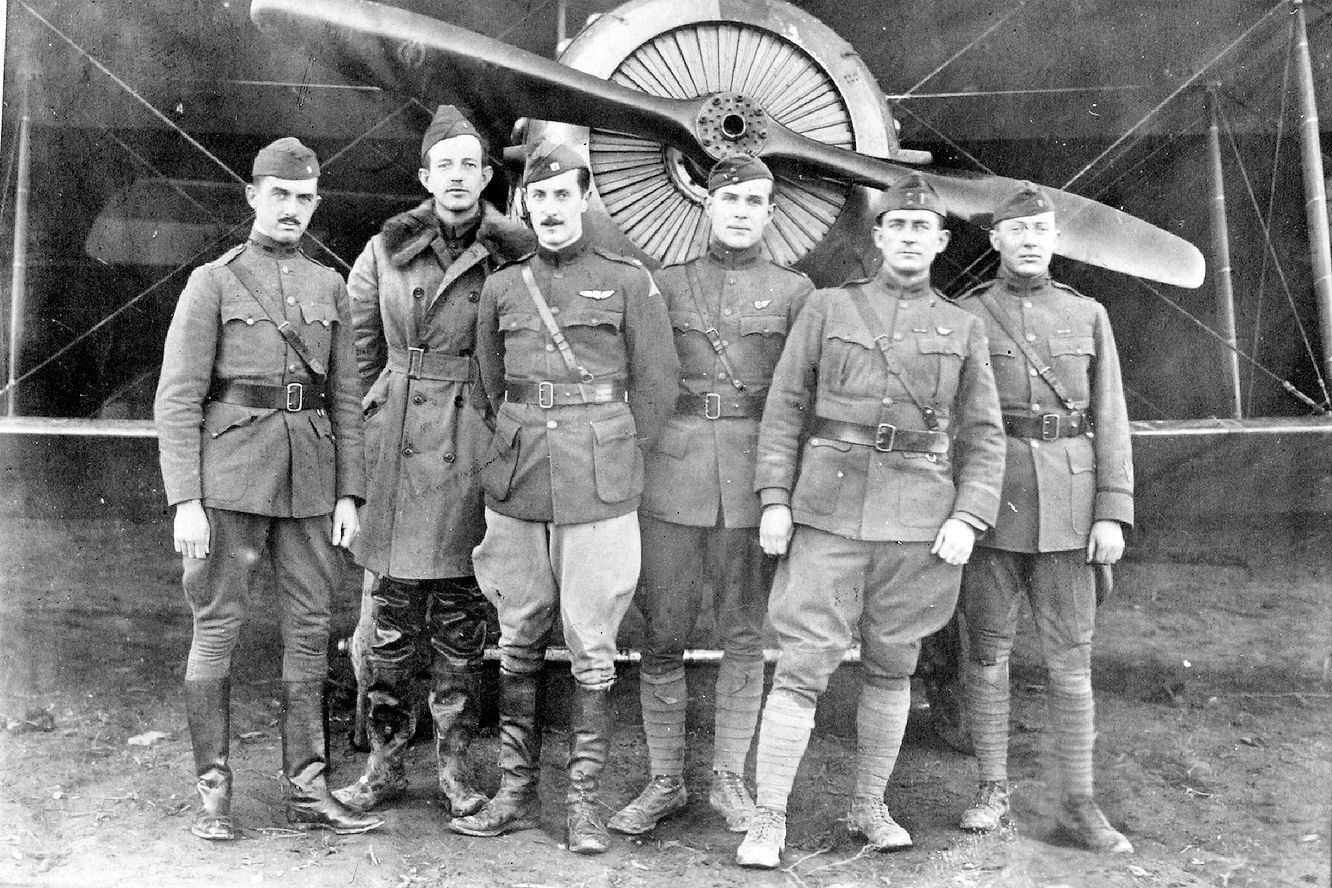
- Members of the 1st Aero Squadron, standing in front of a Salmson 2A2 reconnaissance aircraft at Croix de Metz Aerodrome in 1918 during World War I

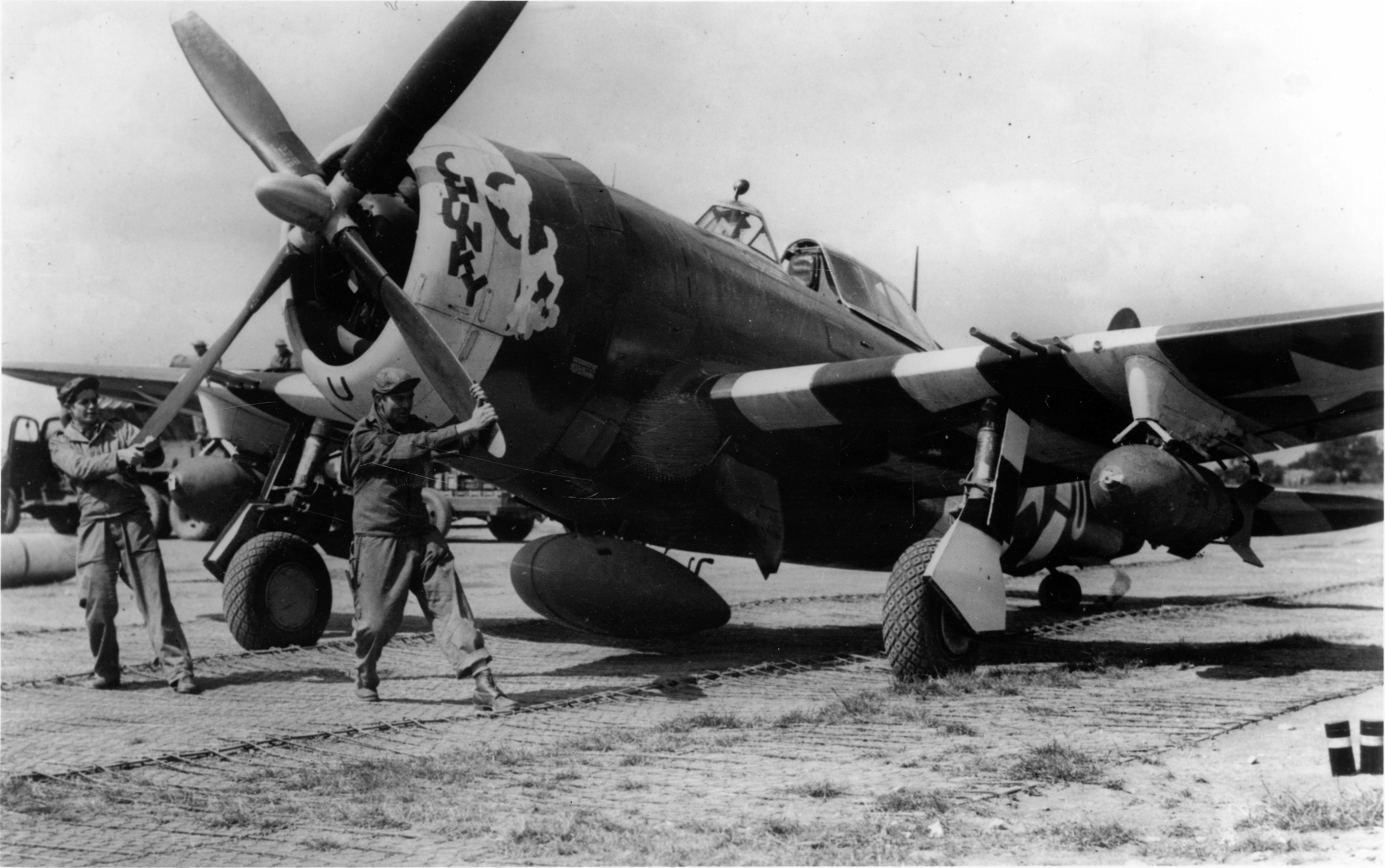
- Ground personnel of the 358th Fighter Group prepare to start the engine of a P-47 Thunderbolt nicknamed "Chunky" at ALG A-90, Toul-Croix De Metz Airfield in 1944 during World War II

Site information
- Type: Military airfield
- Controlled by: Armée de l'Air; United States Army Air Service; United States Army Air Forces
- Condition: Industrial Estate

Location
- Coordinates: 48°41′53.25″N 005°55′02.23″E

Site history
- Built: 1916 (Approximately)
- In use: 1916-1945
- Battles/wars: World War I World War II

Toul-Croix De Metz Airfield is a former military airfield which is located approximately one mile (1.6 km) northeast of Toul (Département de Meurthe-et-Moselle, Lorraine); 160 miles (260 km) east of Paris.

The airfield had its probable origins as early as 1912, as an Aéronautique Militaire airfield, later being extensively used by the United States Army Air Service. It became a permanent airfield between the wars and during the Phony War with Nazi Germany (1939–1940) was the home of G.C. II/5 (The French Air Force descendant of the World War I Lafayette Escadrille) equipped with American Curtis Hawk 75A fighters. Seized in the Battle of France, it became a Luftwaffe airfield until being captured by the United States Third Army in September 1944. It then became a United States Army Air Forces combat airfield until the end of the war.

After the war, the airfield was redeveloped into a private industrial estate.

== History ==
=== World War I ===
Archives concerning the origins of the Toul-Croix de Metz airfield are rather scarce. Some documents show that the area was turned to the Army as soon as 1912, but the "Aero-Guide" of 1913 and the "Guide Michelin pour les Pilotes Militaires" of 1914 mention only two usable airfields around Toul: one at Dommartin, 1 mi. east of town - with a hangar for airships, and military grounds 1.5 mi. west of town. However, the airfield of Croix de Metz is heavily used by the Aéronautique Militaire as early as August 1914. Two barracks were built each side of the airfield at some time between 1912 and 1916: "Caserne Ferber" on the south side, and "Caserne Gengoult" on the north side, which was later used by the Americans forces, which explain why the Croix de Metz airfield was sometimes called Gengoult Aerodrome. Airships flown from Toul probably departed from Dommartin.

In April 1918 it was turned over to the American Expeditionary Force (AEF). When first deployed to France, the first few Aero Squadrons of the AEF were dispersed under various army commands, among other reasons to completed their training. When ready for action and numerous enough, to obtain coordination of aerial activities, some higher organization was required: the United States Army Air Service fighter and bomber Aero Squadrons were thus organized in one Bombardment Group and four Pursuit Groups, meanwhile the observation and reconnaissance Aero Squadrons joined Corps and Army Observation Groups Known American units at Toul were:.

In the first days of September 1918, a detachment of 484th sqn (Construct.) arrived to perform some 1-11/9/18 [préparation offensive Saint Mihiel; retour > Lay St Remy].

==== American units at Toul during World War I ====
Headquarters The buildings of the "Caserne Gengoult" were used the house many headquarters:

- 1st Pursuit Group, 5 May 1918 – 28 June 1918 (formed from 1st Pursuit Organization and Training Center)
- 2d Pursuit Group, 29 June 1918 – 23 September 1918
- 1st Pursuit Wing, 6 July 1918 – c. 24 September 1918
- Air Service, IV Corps, August 1918 – unknown
- Corps Observation Wing, c. 12 August 1918 – September 1918
- I Corps Observation Group, 22 August 1918 –19 September 1918
- Air Service, Second Army, 12 October 1918 – 15 April 1919
- 4th Pursuit Group, 26 October 1918 – 15 April 1919

Squadrons

- 1st Pursuit Organization and Training Center, then 1st Pursuit Group from 5 May (First Army)
  - 94th Aero Squadron (Pursuit), 7 April 1918 – 29 June 1918
  - 95th Aero Squadron (Pursuit), 4 May 1918 – 28 June 1918
  - 27th Aero Squadron (Pursuit), 1 – 26 June 1918
  - 147th Aero Squadron (Pursuit), 1 – 28 June 1918
- 2nd Pursuit Group (First Army, part of the 1st Pursuit Wing from 6 July)
  - 13th Aero Squadron (Pursuit), 28 June 1918 – 23 September 1918
  - 139th Aero Squadron (Pursuit) 30 June 1918 – 24 September 1918
  - 103d Aero Squadron (Pursuit), 4 July 1918 – 7 August 1918
  - 49th Aero Squadron (Pursuit), 2 August 1918 – 23 September 1918
  - 22d Aero Squadron (Pursuit), 16 August 1918 – 22 September 1918
- 28th Aero Squadron (3rd Pursuit Group, First Army) 15 – 16 July 1918 (transfer from Orly to Vaucouleurs).
- I Corps Observation Group (First Army)
  - 1st Aero Squadron (Observation), 22 August 1918 – 21 September 1918
  - 12th Aero Squadron (Observation), 22 August 1918 – 20 September 1918
- IV Corps Observation Group (First Army, then Second Army from 14 October – HQ in Remicourt then Julvécourt)
  - 8th Aero Squadron (Observation), 29 September 1918 – 23 October 1918
  - 135th Aero Squadron (Observation), 30 September 1918 – 21 November 1918
  - 168th Aero Squadron (Observation), 5 October 1918 – 21 November 1918
  - 85th Aero Squadron (Observation), 10 – 24 November 1918
- 4th Pursuit Group
  - 822nd Aero Squadron, becoming 6th Air Park October 1918 – April 1919
  - 141st Aero Squadron (Pursuit), 19 October 1918 – 19 April 1919
  - 25th Aero Squadron (Pursuit), 24 October 1918 – 15 April 1919
  - 17th Aero Squadron (Pursuit), 4 November 1918 – 12 December 1918
  - 148th Aero Squadron (Pursuit), 4 November 1918 – 11 December 1918
- 278th Aero Squadron (VII Corps Obs. Group/First Army, 14 Nov to Second Army) 10 November 1918 – 15 April 1919

Other units

- Photographic Section No. 1, 24 August – 19 September 1918
- 6th Balloon Company, ca. August – September 1918
- 7th Balloon Company, September 1918 – 1918
- 8th Balloon Company, August-ca. September 1918
- 10th Balloon Company, 1918
- 11th Balloon Company, ca. July 1918 – 1918
- 42d Balloon Company, ca. June 1918 – 1918
- 43d Balloon Company, 16 August-ca. September 1918
- 69th Balloon Company, 1918-September 1918

As Croix de Metz was one of the most active American airfields, other air units might have been assigned to it during World War I, yet unidentified. The Americans at Toul flew reconnaissance sorties, protected observation aircraft, attacked enemy observation balloons, strafed enemy troops, flew counter-air patrols, and bombed towns, bridges, and railroad stations behind the enemy's lines.

Some of the most illustrious names in early American Army aviation were assigned to Toul during World War I, including Eddie Rickenbacker; Quentin Roosevelt; Frank Luke; Carl Spaatz; Billy Mitchell and others.

The Americans at Toul demobilized and left France after the Armistice on 11 November 1918, the last leaving in early 1919, as can be seen above.

=== Between the wars ===
The airfield first appears in the navigation charts in 1920 as a 400 x 900 m landing ground. In 1928, a part of it was assigned to the local "Aero-club Toulois", which seems to be the only permanent user. The airfield is expanded in 1936, probably at the same time 4 hangars are built, but still with no unit permanently stationed.

When World War II broke out in September 1939, the "Groupe de Chasse II/5" was assigned to Toul-Croix De Metz; the Group's first "escadrille" aircraft sported a "Sioux Head", but it was not before 1942 that the escadron received the lineage of the Lafayette Escadrille, thus becoming "Groupe de Chasse II/5 Lafayette". The Group was equipped with (not so) obsolete Curtiss Hawk Model 75s. From surviving accounts of the squadron during the Battle of France the Hawk-equipped Group claimed 230 confirmed and 80 probable victories in H75s against only 29 aircraft lost in aerial combat. In addition to the French unis, Polish Air Force exiles flew Morane fighters with the "Groupe de Chasse III/1" from the airfield during the early spring weeks before the German offensive into France and the Low Countries.

With the subsequent German Blitzkrieg and the breakout of the Wehrmacht at Sedan the French Army and the British Expeditionary Force was overwhelmed. The few units still on the field surrendered to the Germans along with the French Armed Forces at the Second Armistice at Compiègne on 22 June 1940.

=== German use during World War II ===
Shortly after its capture, the airfield was turned over to the Luftwaffe. The airfield was initially used primarily as a training base for ground support units. In September 1942, Zerstörerschule 2 (Fighter-Destroyer School 2) (ZS 2) used the base as a training facility for Messerschmitt Bf 110 fighter pilots until February 1944.

Toul became an operational airfield in July 1944, when Kampfgeschwader 53 (KG 53) arrived at the airfield with Heinkel He 111 medium bombers. The He 111s were used as carrier aircraft for launching V-1 Flying Bombs, aimed at targets in Britain. kg 53 withdrew from the airfield at the end of August, ahead of the advancing American Third Army which was moving into the area. Toul-Croix De Metz was attacked by USAAF Eighth Air Force B-17 Flying Fortress heavy bombers to attempt to stop these V-1 attacks.

=== American use during World War II ===
The IX Engineer Command moved the 826th Engineer Aviation Battalion to Toul airfield on 14 September 1944. The airfield was relatively intact, and began clearing the airport of mines; destroyed Luftwaffe aircraft, and repairing operational facilities for use by American aircraft. Subsequently, it became a USAAF Ninth Air Force combat airfield, designated as Advanced Landing Ground "A-90" Toul-Croix De Metz the next day.

Under American control, Toul-Croix De Metz was initially used as a resupply and casualty evacuation (S&E) airfield, with C-47 Skytrain transports using the airfield frequently, carrying in supplies and moving wounded personnel to hospitals in the rear. In October, the 862d EAB moved in and laid down a 5000' Pierced Steel Planking all-weather runway. The engineers also repaired the barracks and other facilities at the base, allowing it to be used though the winter months.

In November, the 358th Fighter Group moved in with P-47 Thunderbolts and flew operational missions from the base until the beginning of April 1945. The airfield was closed, and returned to French control after the war on 30 October 1945.

=== Postwar use ===
In French control after the war, the airfield was closed and for years was left unused. The growing urban area of Toul and the need for other, more pressing reconstruction after the war led the Air Ministry to sell off the property to private interests, and not rebuild it as a military airfield. A major reason was that the airfield was physically small, and the cost to purchase additional land to build a jet runway, and other facilities was very high. In addition, the prospect of jet fighter aircraft taking off and landing over the urbanized area around the airfield was highly undesirable. In 1950 when NATO was looking to locate an American Air Force fighter airfield in the area, given the historical American association with Toul, the World War II airfield at Rosieres En Haye was made available.

=== United States Army use ===
In 1951, the abandoned airfield was turned over by the French to the United States Army for use as an Engineering Depot. Army units were assigned to the field to clear the remnants of the World War II Army Airfield and completely re-design the facility. Railroad spurs, new hard-surfaced roads, permanent buildings, warehouses and utilities were put in, and in December 1952 the facility was re-opened as the Toul Engineer Depot.

Initially used as a reserve depot for supplies and equipment, but in 1955 the facility was upgraded to become a major depot supporting USAREUR units in both France and Germany. This was scaled back in 1956 due to budget reductions to support Army Engineering units in France only. Further budget cuts in 1960 led to its consolidation with the Army's Nancy General Depot, and in November 1961 the facility was closed and returned to French military control.

=== Current use ===
The French government sold the land and all of the buildings to private interests during the 1960s. Today in aerial photography, clear outlines of former buildings can be seen in grassy areas, as well as the runways and taxiways of the former airfield, the streets put in by the United States Army. It is now an industrial estate.

== See also ==
- Advanced Landing Ground
