= Tours Aerodrome =

Tours Aerodrome Second Air Instructional Center
- Part of American Expeditionary Forces (AEF)
- Located near: Tours, France
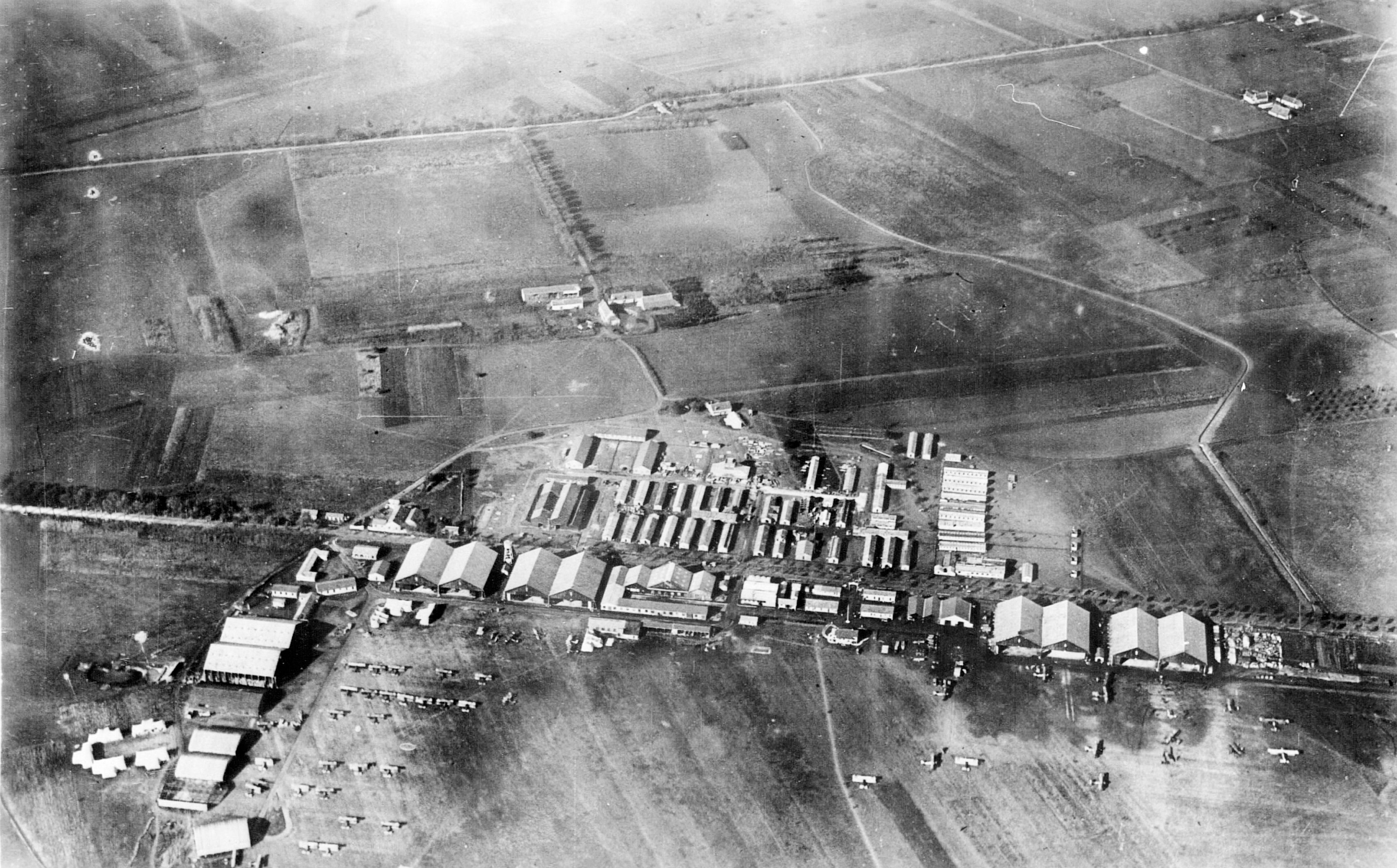
- 2d Air Instructional Center (Looking from the southeast to northwest), Tours Aerodrome, France, 1918

Site information
- Type: Pilot training airfield
- Controlled by: Air Service, United States Army
- Condition: Tours Val de Loire Airport (Base Aérienne 604).

Location
- Coordinates: 47°25′50″N 000°43′08″E

Site history
- Built: 1918
- In use: 1918–Present
- Battles/wars: World War I

Garrison information
- Garrison: 2d Air Instructional Center; American Expeditionary Forces

Tours Aerodrome was a complex of military airfields in the French department of Indre-et-Loire, 6 km (3.2 NM) north-northeast of the city of Tours. They were used during World War I as part of the Second Air Instructional Center (2d AIC), American Expeditionary Forces for training United States airmen prior to being sent into combat.

Today Tours Airdrome #1 airfield is Tours Val de Loire Airport (Base Aérienne 604).

== Background ==
The airfield complex is located about three miles northwest of the city of Tours, Department of Indre-et-Loire, on the main road to Vendome.

Tours initially was established by the French Aeronautique Militaire as a training school for pilots prior to the United States entry into World War I. On 23 July 1917, a group of 47 enlisted Air Service men arrived in France on the SS Orduna. Ten members were ordered to Paris to receive ground commissions while the balance were sent to Tours for flying training. The training was provided by an agreement made with the French to train a limited number of Americans, then the entire school would be turned over to the Headquarters Air Service, American Expeditionary Force on 1 September. However, owing to a limited number of personnel available, the French retained overall control of the school until the end of the war in November 1918.

A number of secondary training airfields, along with the main complex were established:

- Spiral (later Combat) Field #3 47°29′05″N 000°43′56″E between Monnaie and Langennerie.
- Farman Field #4 47°25′35″N 000°45′22″E, at Rochecorbon, used for aerial gunnery.
- Spiral Field (New) #6 47°27′41″N 000°43′45″E , at Meslay.
- Monnaie Field #8 47°29′05″N 000°46′44″E, at "La Feuillée".
- At "Les Bois-Métais", northwest of Reugny (NE of the field), 225 acres were requisitioned on 14 September 1918 for another new training field, but the procedure was cancelled on 18 November before any work began.

There were two other training grounds: Larçay, for aerial gunnery as at Field #4 à Rochecorbon, and at "Le Ruchard", east of Chinon, for artillery cooperation; those two grounds could have been the missing Fields #5 and #7...

Also four emergency fields were located near Saint-Avertin, south of the Cher River about four miles south of the main airfield (#1).

In addition to the pilot training, the 2d AIC eventually developed specialist schools in Aerial Observation, Radio, Photography and Aerial Gunnery. The training complexes at Issoudun Aerodrome (3d AIC) and Tours were the two largest training schools in France for Air Service pilots.

== Operations ==
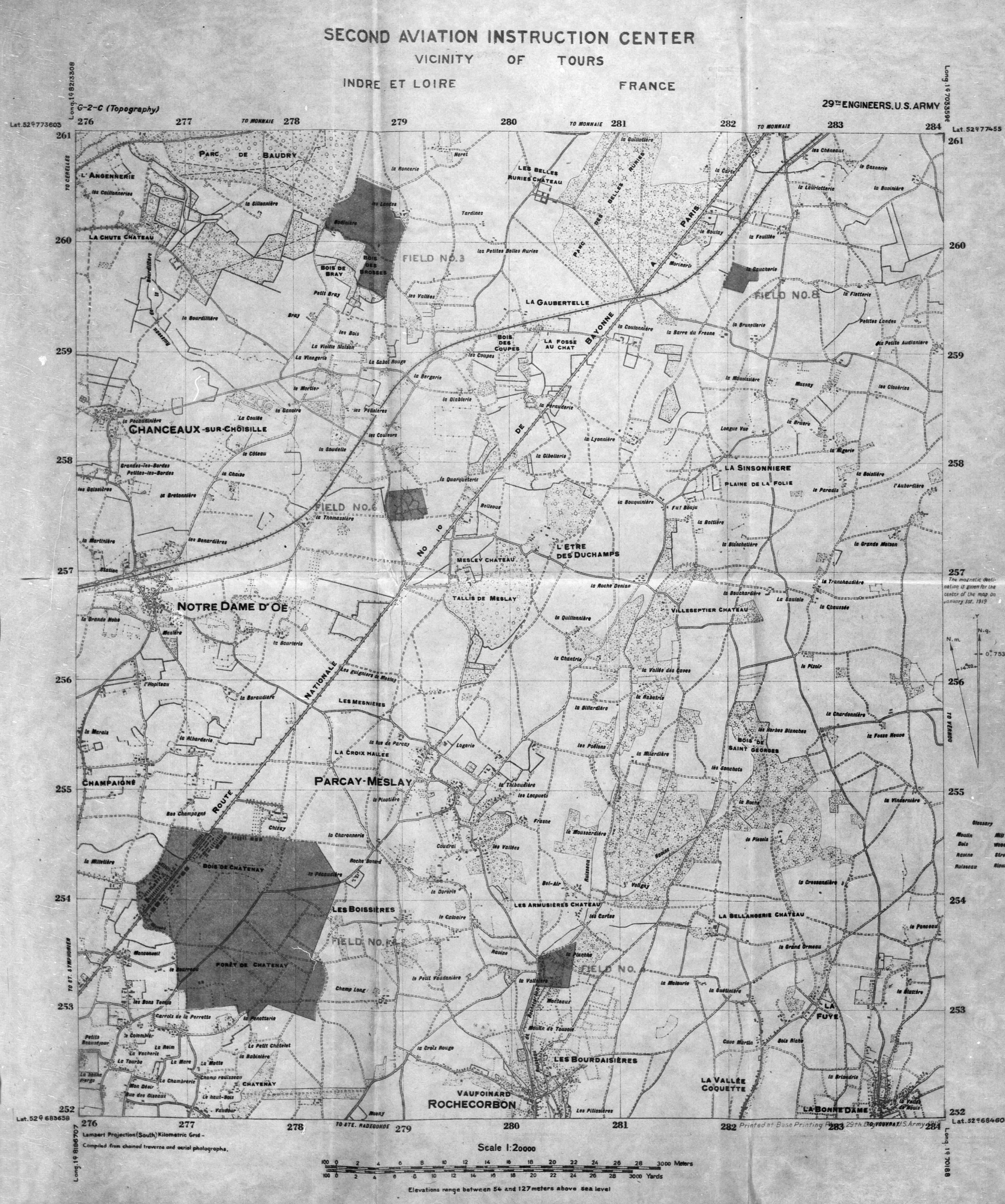
Map of Second Air Instructional Center, Tours Aerodrome, France.

The first Air Service training class arrived at Tours on 15 August, and followed a detachment of United States Naval cadets that had completed their training at Tours a few days before. Like the Naval aviators, the Army fliers were allotted in groups to classes under French instructors. The rivalry between cadets was intense, for the honor at stake was that of being the first pilot of the Air Service to be breveted in France. It was finally shared between two, Oscar G. Gude and J. W. Watts, later 1st Lieutenants, who completed their training on 11 September 1917. The first class was succeeded by the second, third and fourth classes, largely recruited from Americans who had volunteered prior to the United States entry in the war and were serving with the French forces. They were, in turn, followed by classes of cadets which arrived from the United States.

On 1 November 1918, a transfer ceremony was held which turned over control of the school to the AEF, however, it was necessary to retain French instruction personnel. It was planned for the school to produce 100 trained pilots per month, however during its first four months of operation, the number was less than 40, with the exception of October 1917, when 55 pilots graduated. At the time, only the main field was in use, and the entire school was equipped with about 50 or 60 Caudron G.3E2 trainers, all of which were well-used and in constant need of repair, having been rebuilt from wrecked trainers. On 1 February 1918, additional flight instructors arrived from the United States, and during the winter two additional airfields were constructed. With the additional number of personnel, 30 additional training aircraft and facilities, the scope of training was greatly increased.

From Tours, the graduates were sent to the 3d AIC at Issoudun Aerodrome for advanced training. The receipt of dual control (D2) trainers reduced the number of accidents and improved the number of solo flying when that stage of training was reached. During February 1918, 45 pilots graduated; in March 104. An average of about 80 pilots graduated each month afterwards.

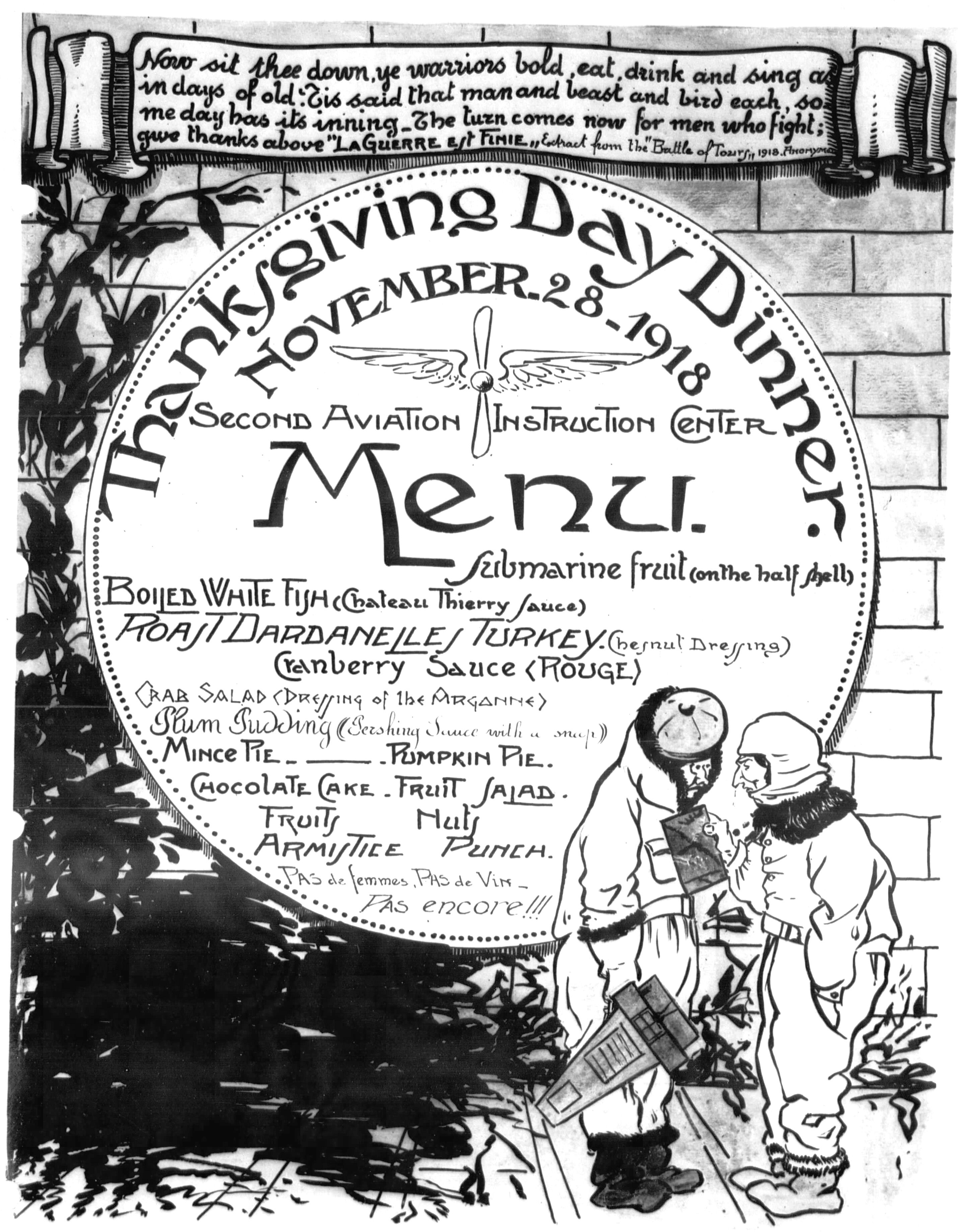
Second Air Instructional Center - Thanksgiving Dinner Menu 1918

The Observers School was opened in January 1918. In addition to the Caudrons, British Sopwith Pups, along with Breguet 14s were utilized. The course given to observers was intended to cover all areas necessary to qualify the observer for front-line duty. Both new personnel were trained, as well as observers trained in the United States, which received training in specialized areas which updated their training already received to meet new conditions and included new methods developed on the front.

During the spring of 1918, the main #1 field was used mostly for training aerial photographers; the Farman Field (#4) was used for soloing, and some de Havilland DH-4s were received which were used there along with the Breguets. Additional buildings were constructed during the summer of 1918 included 23 barracks, 3 maintenance shops, 10 warehouses and 3 hangars. These additional resources made possible the establishment of Radio and other smaller schools, along with the aerial gunnery school, with a gunnery range being established.

By September 1918, the operations of the Tours School were in full swing. The work over the previous year in establishing facilities, curriculum and establishing instructor corps in various disciplines had paid off. The maximum number of flying personnel was reached in November, when there were 139 staff pilots on duty at the station. By then, two shifts were provided, with the long daylight hours of summer providing up to 14 or 15 hours each day for training.

The coming of the armistice on 11 November 1918 ended the formal training program at the school. By then facilities included 10 Cathedral hangars, 17 steel hangars, 4 Bressenau hangars and 18 single-plane canvas hangars. Aircraft included 9 Caudrons, 10 Niewports, 12 Salmsons, 43 Breguets, 47 de Havilland 4s, 25 Sopwiths, and 4 Spad XIIIs. A support station of 50 buildings, schools, barracks, and other buildings had been erected. Students in training were given opportunity to complete their training, but no new students were accepted. All student training was completed by 31 December.

== See also ==
- List of Air Service American Expeditionary Force aerodromes in France
