= 22nd Intelligence Squadron =

US Air Force unit

22d Intelligence Squadron
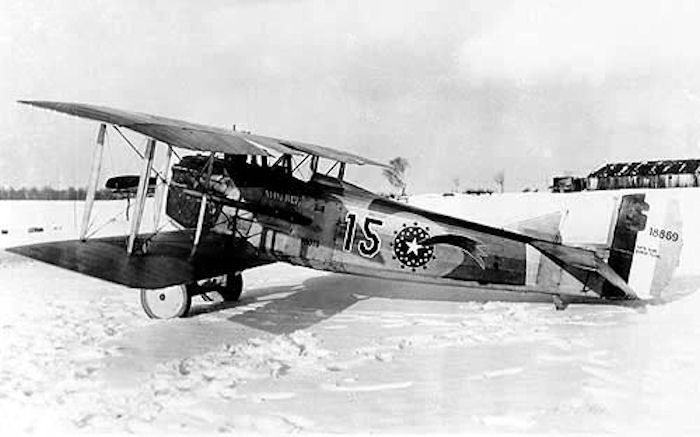
- 22d Aero Squadron SPAD S.XIII, Souilly Aerodrome, France
- Active: 1917–1946; 1965–1971; 1976–1979; 1993–present
- Country: United States
- Branch: United States Air Force
- Type: Squadron
- Role: Intelligence
- Part of: Air Force Intelligence, Surveillance and Reconnaissance Agency
- Garrison/HQ: Fort George G. Meade, Maryland
- Engagements: World War I; World War II – American Theater; World War II – EAME Theater
- Decorations: Air Force Outstanding Unit Award with Combat "V" Device; Air Force Outstanding unit Award

Insignia
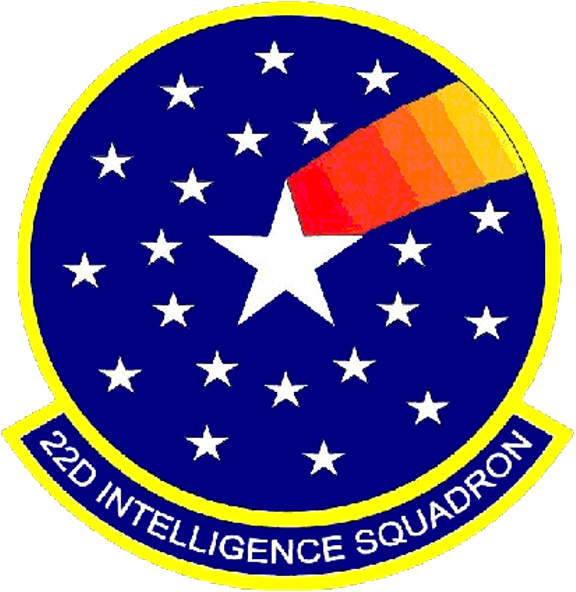
- 22d Intelligence Squadron emblem

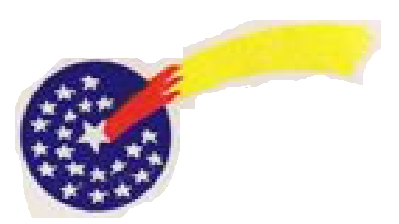
- 22d Observation Squadron emblem (approved 1 March 1924) (Note: Based on emblem approved by AEF on 15 November 1918. Cross and Cockade Journal, Vol. V, No. 2, p. 145.)

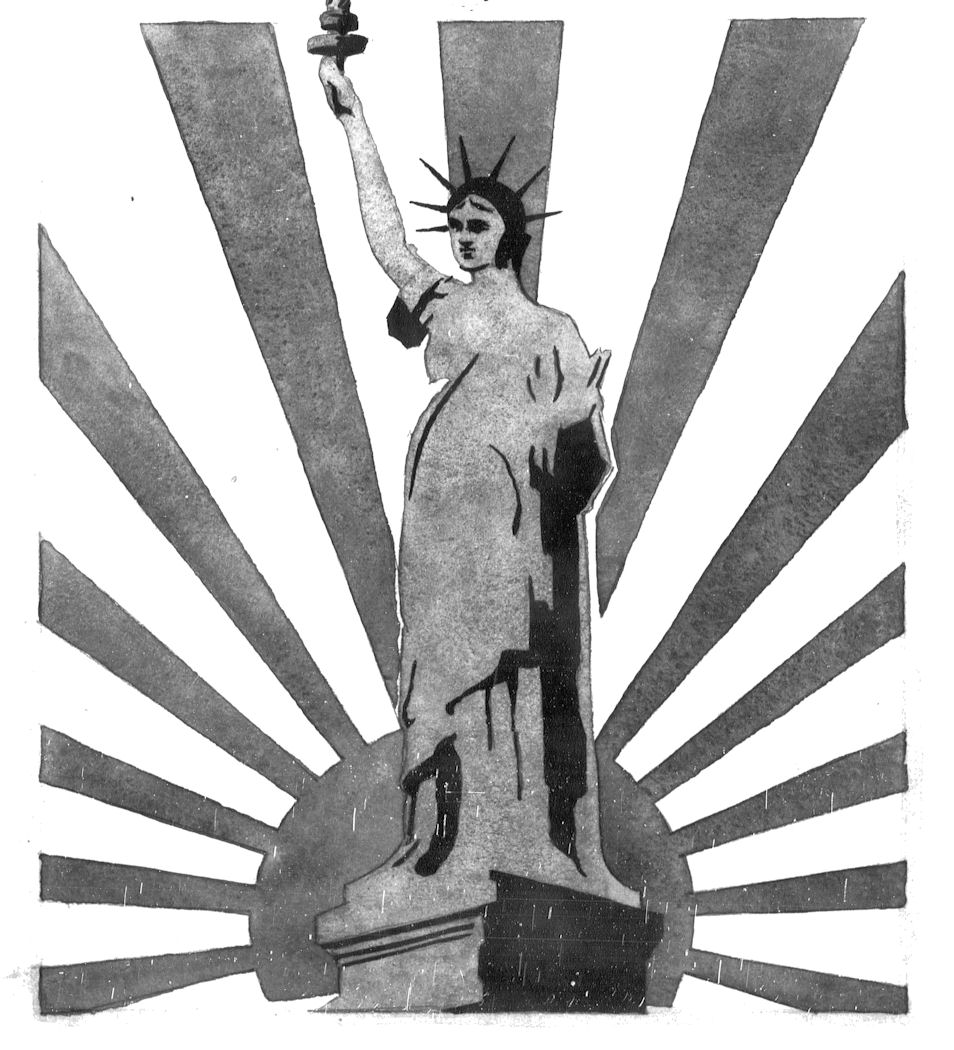
- 135th Aero Squadron emblem (approved 15 November 1918)

The 22d Intelligence Squadron (22 IS) is a non-flying squadron of the United States Air Force. It is assigned to the 691st Intelligence, Surveillance and Reconnaissance Group, Fort George G. Meade, Maryland.

The 22 IS is one of the oldest units in the United States Air Force, its lineage and history consisting of two World War I Western Front combat squadrons.

- The 22d Aero Squadron was organized on 16 June 1917 at Kelly Field, Texas. A Pursuit (Fighter) squadron of the American Expeditionary Forces, it took part in the Somme Defensive; St. Mihiel offensive, and Meuse-Argonne offensive campaigns. The unit was demobilized after the war in 1919.
- The 135th Aero Squadron was organized on 1 August 1917 at Rockwell Field, California. A Corps Observation (Reconnaissance) squadron, it took part in the Somme Defensive; St. Mihiel offensive, and Meuse-Argonne offensive campaigns. It was re-designated as the 22d Observation Squadron in March 1921 as part of the permanent United States Army Air Service.

The two units were consolidated in April 1937. During World War II, the squadron became part of Ninth Air Force in the European Theater of Operations (ETO) as a tactical reconnaissance squadron. During the Cold War, it was part of Tactical Air Command.

== Overview ==
The 22d Intelligence Squadron provides decisive information operations shaping the battle space environment. It tasks, conducts operations on, and provides effective organization, control, technical guidance, and support of signals intelligence (SIGINT) activities in support of the Department of Defense (DOD) and other authorized organizations as an integral part of the National Security Agency (NSA).

The Squadron conducts Air Force airborne and ground operational and technical intelligence, analysis, training and dissemination missions at National Security Agency, providing 24-hour real time national level information collection and analysis to U. S. and allied combat commanders, unified and specified commands, National Command Authorities and other non- Department of Defense agencies.

The 22 IS is specialized and consists of teams of intelligence professionals supporting global reach, focusing global power, and securing and maintaining information superiority by providing leadership and representation to ensure the proper placement and timely integration of qualified personnel into the National Security Agency (NSA), Directorate of Operations. The 22 IS sustains quality of life and ensures adequate training for all personnel to be able to meet Air Force and NSA peacetime and warfighting objectives. The 22 IS performs information operations through multiple sources for national, theater, and tactical customers.

The 22 IS oversees administrative and logistical support of assigned flights within NSA, and provides operational support, in liaison with the 707 Intelligence, Surveillance, and Reconnaissance Group, to all squadron members involved in NSA activities. The Squadron coordinates with appropriate NSA elements within groups to present orientation briefings and support to supervisors of squadron members. It influences intelligence and communications computer systems security that is provided to the tactical warfighters, theater-battle managers, and national-level decision makers, as well as influencing analysis, production, and dissemination of near real-time intelligence in various products to unified and specified commanders, and the intelligence community.

== History ==
=== World War I ===
see 22d Aero Squadron and 135th Aero Squadron for expanded histories of their World War I operations

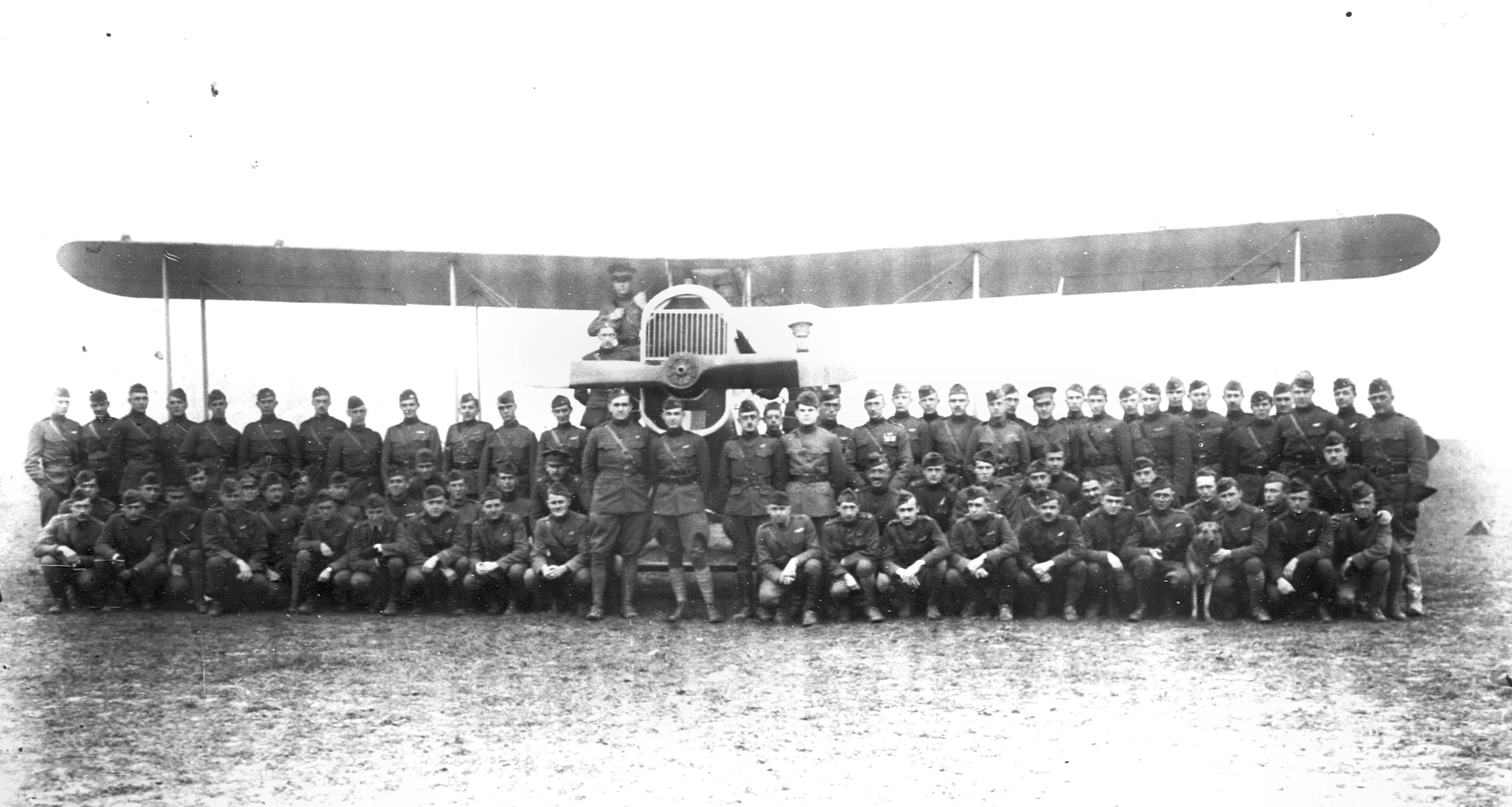
135th Aero Squadron, November 1918, Gengault Aerodrome (Toul), France

Established as the 7th Aero Squadron in June 1917; redesignated 22d Aero Squadron later that month in an Air Service reorganisation. Trained with JN-4 Jennys in Texas, later receiving instruction in British aircraft in Toronto, Ontario, Canada with the Royal Flying Corps, until 19 October 1917, when it returned to Taliaferro Field. On 21 January 1918, it was shipped to Garden City, and shipped out on the RMS Adriatic (1907) on 31 January 1918. When it arrived in England, the squadron Flights (A, B, C) were split up amongst English squadrons, and used in bombing and observation missions.

In Europe, the 22nd and 135th Aero Squadrons fought in combat on the Western Front as fighter squadrons, flying French SPAD S.XIIIs (22d Aero) and British Airco DH.4s (135th Aero). The unit was finally reassembled on 24 June 1918 at Guînes, and went to (Issoudun). It remained in combat, moving to numerous airfields as needed along the front frequently as the ground situation required. On 7 July 1918, the unit went to Orly, and was retasked as a Pursuit squadron. On 16 August 1918, it was sent to Toul, and on 21 August 1918 started combat operations. It was then sent to Belrain on or about 20 September 1918 and remained there until after the armistice. After the November 1918 cease fire, remained in France until the spring of 1919 when was returned to the United States. 22d Aero was demobilized and inactivated in June 1919; 135th Aero remained as part of the postwar Air Service.

=== Inter-war period ===
After returning from France, most of the 135th Aero Squadron demobilized at Hazelhurst Field, Long Island, and returned to civilian life. A small cadre of the unit remained in the Air Service, and were assigned to Post Field, Oklahoma, and attached as an observation squadron, supplying aircraft for the United States Army Field Artillery School at Fort Sill and supported Army units at Fort Leavenworth, Kansas. Was moved to Maxwell Field, Alabama in late 1921 and provided reconnaissance for Army units in the IV Corps Area. Participated in the annual maneuvers of the 8th Infantry Brigade 1923–31, however continued to support Army units at Fort Bragg, North Carolina throughout the 1920s with a detachment assigned to Pope Field.

Re-designated as the 22d Observation Squadron on 25 January 1923. Pilots of the 22d Squadron’s detachment at Pope Field, North Carolina, mapped routes to Savannah and Macon, Georgia, and Louisville, Kentucky. So it went in order that all parts of the country might be covered.

Transferred in 1931 to Brooks Field, Texas supporting Army units in Texas. In 1937, the Army Air Corps consolidated the unit with the demobilized 22d Aero Squadron and giving the unit a second World War I lineage and honors. Supported Army units at Fort Sam Houston, Texas.

=== World War II ===
After the Attack on Pearl Harbor was assigned to Third Air Force in 1942, supporting Army units at Fort Polk, Louisiana in training maneuvers. Deployed to the Desert Training Center in Southern California in 1942 providing reconnaissance and helping to prepare Fifth Army ground forces for desert combat prior to the Operation Torch landings in French West Africa in November 1942. Later returned to North Carolina to support units at Fort Bragg; later Fort Campbell, Kentucky with flying observation missions.

In late 1944 was ordered to train for service overseas as a combat reconnaissance squadron Re-equipped with modern A-20, P-39 and P-40 fighters used as tactical reconnaissance aircraft. Trained under Third Air Force for battlefield tactical reconnaissance missions. Deployed to Nancy/Essey Airfield (Y-42), France in March 1945 as part of Ninth Air Force, later to Haguenau Airfield (Y-39), France in April flying tactical reconnaissance missions over Nazi Germany with P-51/F6 photo-reconnaissance aircraft in the closing stage of the war, supporting Allied ground forces (Primarily US Third Army) as part of the Western Allied invasion of Germany.

Returned to the United States after the German Capitulation in May. Conducted pilot training at DeRidder airfield Louisiana in May 1945 for missions in the Pacific theater, however never deployed due to Japanese Capitulation in September. Became part of the Continental Air Forces Third Air Force at Drew Field, Florida in August, being reassigned to Brooks Field, Texas in December. Demobilized throughout 1946, inactivated in August.

=== Cold War ===
Reactivated at Shaw AFB, South Carolina, 1971, not manned or equipped. Reactivated as an unmanned drone reconnaissance squadron at Davis-Monthan AFB, Arizona under Tactical Air Command in 1971 with the establishment of the 11th Tactical Drone Squadron on 1 July 1971 under the 355th Tactical Fighter Wing. The 22d Tactical Drone Squadron was a second drone squadron at Davis-Monthan, being activated and assigned to the 432d Tactical Drone Group on 1 July 1976; being its operational component.

Performed photographic reconnaissance to support tactical air and surface forces with tactical drones manufactured by Ryan Aeronautical. Used AQM-34L/M/V drones, DC-130 launch vehicles, and CH-3 recovery helicopters. The group conducted follow-on testing and evaluation of the AQM-34V model drone and the initial operational testing and evaluation and developmental testing and evaluation of the DC-130H "mother ship." The 432d also supported testing and evaluation of the BQM-34C drone at Hill AFB, Utah.

Support organizations included the 432d Field Maintenance (later Drone Generation) Squadron and 432d Organizational Maintenance (later Aircraft Generation) Squadron.

Both TDS were inactivated in 1979 due to budget restrictions; drone operations moved to Eglin AFB. Florida.

==== Aces ====
- Jacques Swaab: 10 victories
- Clinton Jones: 8 victories
- James Beane: 6 victories
- Arthur Raymond Brooks: 6 victories
- Remington Vernam: 5 victories

=== Lineage ===
22d Aero Squadron

- Organized as the 17th Aero Squadron on 16 June 1917

Redesignated 22d Aero Squadron on 20 June 1917
Redesignated 22d Aero Squadron (Pursuit) on 16 August 1918
Demobilized on 16 June 1919

- Consolidated with the 22d Observation Squadron on 17 April 1937

22d Intelligence Squadron

- Organized as the 135th Aero Squadron on 1 August 1917

Redesignated 135th Aero Squadron (Corps Observation) on 19 July 1918
Redesignated 135th Aero Squadron on 29 May 1919
Redesignated 22d Squadron (Observation), 14 March 1921
Redesignated 22d Observation Squadron on 25 January 1923

- Consolidated with 22d Aero Squadron (Pursuit), on 17 April 1937

Redesignated 22d Observation Squadron (Medium) on 13 January 1942
Redesignated 22d Observation Squadron on 4 July 1942
Redesignated 22d Reconnaissance Squadron (Bombardment) On 2 April 1943
Redesignated 22d Tactical Reconnaissance Squadron on 11 August 1943
Inactivated on 31 August 1946

- Activated on 1 December 1965

Inactivated on 15 October 1971

- Redesignated 22d Tactical Drone Squadron

Activated on 1 July 1976
Inactivated on 1 April 1979

- Redesignated 22d Intelligence Squadron

Activated on 1 October 1993

=== Assignments ===
As 22d Aero Squadron (World War I)

- Post Headquarters, Kelly Field, 16 June 1917 – 21 January 1918

Attached to the Royal Flying Corps for training, 9 August 1917 – 21 January 1918

- Aviation Concentration Center, 25 January-10 February 1918

Overseas transport, RMS Adriatic, 10–16 February 1918

- American Expeditionary Force, 16 January 1918

Attached to the Royal Flying Corps for training, 24 January-19 July 1918

- 3d Air Instructional Center, 26 June 1918
- Air Service Acceptance Park No. 1, 7 July 1918
- 2d Pursuit Group, 16 August 1918
- American Expeditionary Force, 29 January-22 May 1919

Return transport, SS Louisville, 22 May-15 June

- Post Headquarters, Hazelhurst Field, 15–17 June 1919

As 135th Aero (later 22d Observation) Squadron

- Post Headquarters, Rockwell Field, 1 August-25 November 1917
- Aviation Concentration Center, 1–18 December 1918

Overseas transport, RMS Orduna, 18–31 December 1918

- American Expeditionary Force, 1 January 1918

Attached to the Royal Flying Corps for training, 8 January-24 June 1918

- 3d Air Instructional Center, 2 July 1918
- IV Corps Observation Group, 19 July 1918
- Second Army Observation Group, November 1918
- American Expeditionary Force, 23 February 1919
- Post Headquarters, Hazelhurst Field, 7 May 1919
- Southern Department, 29 May 1919

Attached to Field Artillery School

- VIII Corps Area, 20 August 1920

Remained attached to Field Artillery School until 30 November 1921

- IV Corps Area, 30 November 1921
- 12th Observation Group, 30 Jun 1931 to consolidation in 1937

After Consolidation

- 12th Observation Group, from consolidation in 1937
- VIII Corps Area, 1 Jun 1937
- Third Army, 3 Oct 1940
- VIII Army Corps, C. Nov 1940
- 73d Observation Group, 1 Sep 1941
- 74th Observation (later Reconnaissance; Tactical Reconnaissance) Group, 12 Mar 1942
- 69th Tactical Reconnaissance (later Reconnaissance) Group, 29 Jan 1945
- Ninth Air Force

Attached to 363d Reconnaissance Group, 29 Jul – 31 Aug 1946

- 363d Tactical Reconnaissance Wing, 15 July-15 October 1971 (never manned or equipped)
- 432d Tactical Drone Group, 1 Jul 1976 – 1 Apr 1979
- 694th Intelligence Group on 1 Oct 1993
- 70th Intelligence, Surveillance, and Reconnaissance Wing, 1 May 2005
- 707th Intelligence, Surveillance, and Reconnaissance Group, 25 Sep 2009 – Present
- 691st Intelligence, Surveillance, and Reconnaissance Group, May 2016 – present

=== Stations ===
22d Aero Squadron (World War I):

- Kelly Field, Texas, 16 June 1917
- Toronto, Ontario, Canada, 9 August 1917

Detachments at Camp Borden, Deseronto, Armour Heights, Longbranch, North Toronto, Leaside

- Hicks Field (Taliaferro #1), Texas, 19 October 1917
- Aviation Concentration Center, Garden City, New York, 25 January 1918
- Liverpool, England, 16 February 1918
- Dunkirk, France, 4 March 1918

Unit divided into flights which operated from various stations in Nord-Pas-de-Calais, and Somme, Regions until squadron reassembled on 24 June 1918
Headquarters flight was in Flanders Region, Belgium
A, B, and C flights in Picardy Region

- Guînes Aerodrome, France, 24 June 1918
- Issoudun Aerodrome, France, 26 June 1918
- Orly Airport, Paris, France, 7 July 1918
- Gengault Aerodrome, France, 16 August 1918
- Belrain Aerodrome, France, 22 September 1918
- Souilly Aerodrome, France, 7 November 1918
- Grand Aerodrome, France, c. 29 January 1919
- Colombey-les-Belles Airdrome, France, 18 April 1919
- Le Mans, France, 2 May 1919
- Brest, France, 22 May 1919
- Hazelhurst Field, New York, 15–17 June 1919

135th Aero (later 22d) Squadron:

- Rockwell Field, California, 1 August-25 November 1917
- Aviation Concentration Center, Garden City, New York, 1–18 December 1917

Overseas Transport: RMS Orduna, 18–31 December 1917

- Glasgow, Scotland, 31 December 1917
- Winchester, England, 1 January 1918

Unit divided into flights which operated from various stations in England, including Waddington, Scampton, and South Carlton

- Winchester, England, 24 June 1918
- Le Havre, France, 28 June 1918
- Issoudun Aerodrome, France, 2 Jul 1918
- Amanty Airdrome, France, 19 Jul 1918
- Ourches Aerodrome, France, 30 Jul 1918
- Gengault Aerodrome, Toul, France, 30 Sep 1918
- Colombey-les-Belles Airdrome, France, 10 Feb 1919
- Tresses, France, 23 Feb 1919
- Bordeaux, France, 18–25 Apr 1919
- Hazelhurst Field, New York, c. 7 May 1919
- Post Field, Oklahoma, 29 May 1919

Flight at Sherman Army Airfield, Kansas, 30 Apr-30 Jun, 6 Sep – 3 Nov 1920
Detachment at Maxwell Field, Alabama, after 4 Nov 1921

- Maxwell Field, Alabama, 30 Nov 1921

Detachment at Pope Field, North Carolina, 26 Nov 1921 – 15 Mar 1931

- Brooks Field, Texas, 28 Jun 1931 to consolidation in 1937

Consolidated squadron:

- Brooks Field, Texas, from consolidation in 1937
- DeRidder Army Air Base, Louisiana 30 Jan 1942
- Esler Field, Louisiana, 13 Dec 1942
- Desert Center Army Air Field, California, 29 Dec 1942
- Morris Field, North Carolina, 24 Sep 1943
- Camp Campbell Army Air Field, Kentucky, 6 Nov 1943
- DeRidder Army Air Base, Louisiana, 19 Apr 1944
- Key Field, Mississippi, 27 Jan – 26 Feb 1945
- Nancy/Essey Airfield (Y-42), France, 22 Mar 1945
- Haguenau Airfield (Y-39), France, 2 Apr–Jul 1945
- Drew Field, Florida, 4 Aug 1945
- Brooks Field, Texas, 1 Dec 1945 – 31 Aug 1946.
- Mountain Home Air Force Base, Idaho, 20 Sep 1966 – 15 Jul 1971
- Shaw Air Force Base, South Carolina, 15 Jul – 15 Oct 1971
- Davis-Monthan Air Force Base, Arizona, 1 Jul 1976 – 1 Apr 1979
- Ft George G. Meade, Maryland, 1 Oct 1993 – present

=== Aircraft ===
- Curtiss JN-4, 1917 (22d AS)
- SPAD S.XIII, 1918–1919 (22d AS)
- Wright-Martin Model V, 1917 (135th AS)
- Curtiss Model J, 1917 (135th AS)
- Dayton-Wright DH-4, 1918–1919 (135th AS)
- Dayton-Wright DH-4, 1919–1927 (22d OS, before consolidation)
- Douglas O-2, 1926–1930
- Included Curtiss JN-6H, JNS-1, and C-1 during period 1919–1930
- Thomas-Morse O-19, 1930–1935
- Douglas O-43, 1934 to consolidation
- Included Douglas O-27, Douglas O-31, and Y10-40 during period 1935–1937
- In addition to Douglas O-43, consolidation to c. 1939
- North American O-47, c. 1939–1941, and Douglas O-46, 1940–1942
- Apparently included Douglas O-25, Douglas O-31, and Douglas O-38 during period from consolidation to 1940
- O-49 Vigilant, 1941–1942, and Curtiss O-52 Owl, 1941–1943
- Included L-4 and P-43 during period 1942–1943
- A-20 and DB-7 Havoc, 1943
- P-39 Airacobra, 1943–1944
- P-40 Warhawk, 1943–1945
- Included A-24 Banshee and L-5 Sentinel during period 1943–1944
- P-51/F-6 Mustang; 1945, 1946
- AQM-34L/M: 1976–1979 (RPV)
- Sikorsky CH-53 Sea Stallion: 1976–1979 (Helicopter)
- DH-130H Hercules Hercules: 1976–1979

== See also ==
- List of American Aero Squadrons
- Tyndall Air Force Base
- Frederick Libby
- Clayton Bissell
