= Jacques Michael Swaab =

American World War I flying ace

Jacques Swaab
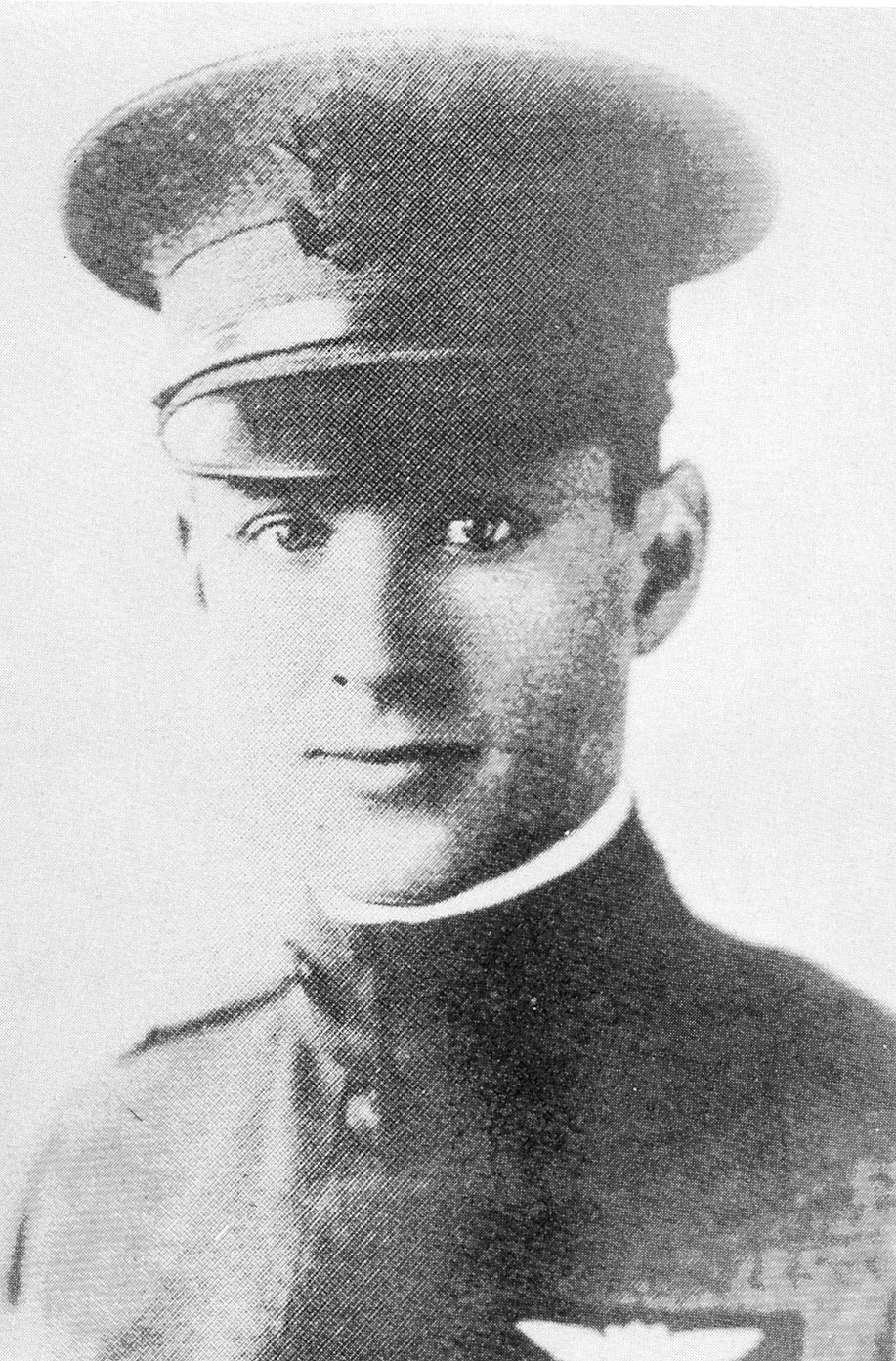
- Lieutenant Jacques Michael Swaab, 22d Aero Squadron, Souilly Aerodrome, France, 1918
- Born: 21 April 1894; Philadelphia, Pennsylvania, USA
- Died: 7 July 1963 (aged 69); Los Angeles, California, USA
- Burial place: Arlington National Cemetery
- Military career
- Allegiance: United States
- Branch: Air Service, United States Army
- Rank: 1st lieutenant
- Unit: 22nd Aero Squadron
- Conflicts: World War I
- Awards: Distinguished Service Cross (United States)

Lieutenant Jacques Michael Swaab (21 April 1894 – 7 July 1963) was an American World War I flying ace with the 22nd Aero Squadron who was credited with ten victories. He later worked in the Hollywood film industry.

== World War I service ==
Swaab reported to the 22nd Aero Squadron on 27 August 1918 and, flying a SPAD XIII, participated in air operations during the battles at Toul, Saint-Mihiel, and the Argonne.

His first combat patrol was on 8 September when he downed a German observation plane and two Fokker D.VIIs, although Swaab was slightly wounded. Twenty days later, he and Lt. James Beane shot down another D.VII, garnering a victory for both of them. On 23 October, Swaab became an ace by downing a Fokker D.VII in flames at 1140 hours that had just destroyed an American balloon. This was probably flown by German ace Max Näther of Jasta 62. Half an hour later, he knocked down a Rumpler two-seater for his sixth victory. On 27 October, he shot down a D.VII solo and shared a victory over a DFW with Clinton Jones. Two days later, he once again shared a victory claim over a D.VII with Beane. On the last day of October, he shot down an LVG observation aircraft.

The ten confirmed victories made him the top scoring ace of the 22nd Aero; his seven unconfirmed claims, if verified, would have made him one of the leading American aces of the war.

== Later life ==
In 1938, Swaab served as technical advisor on the film The Dawn Patrol, starring Errol Flynn and David Niven.

Swaab died in Los Angeles on 7 July 1963 and is buried in Arlington National Cemetery.

== Citation ==
The Distinguished Service Cross is presented to Jacques M. Swaab, First Lieutenant (Air Service), U.S. Army, for extraordinary heroism in action near Montfaucon, France, September 28, 1918, and in the region of Champignuelle, October 27, 1918. On September 28 Lieutenant Swaab, although himself pursued by two enemy planes, perceiving one of his comrades in distress and in danger of being shot down, dived upon the enemy plane which was directly behind that of his comrade and shot the enemy plane out of control, forcing it to withdraw. His prompt act in going to the assistance of his comrade enabled the latter to escape. On October 27 Lieutenant Swaab and another member of his group engaged in combat with seven enemy planes. In this encounter, although outnumbered, Lieutenant Swaab continued in his attack and succeeded in shooting down an enemy D. F. W. observation plane.

== See also ==
- List of World War I flying aces from the United States

== Bibliography ==
- American Aces of World War I. Norman Franks, Harry Dempsey. Osprey Publishing, 2001. ISBN 1-84176-375-6, ISBN 978-1-84176-375-0.
