= 69th Reconnaissance Group =

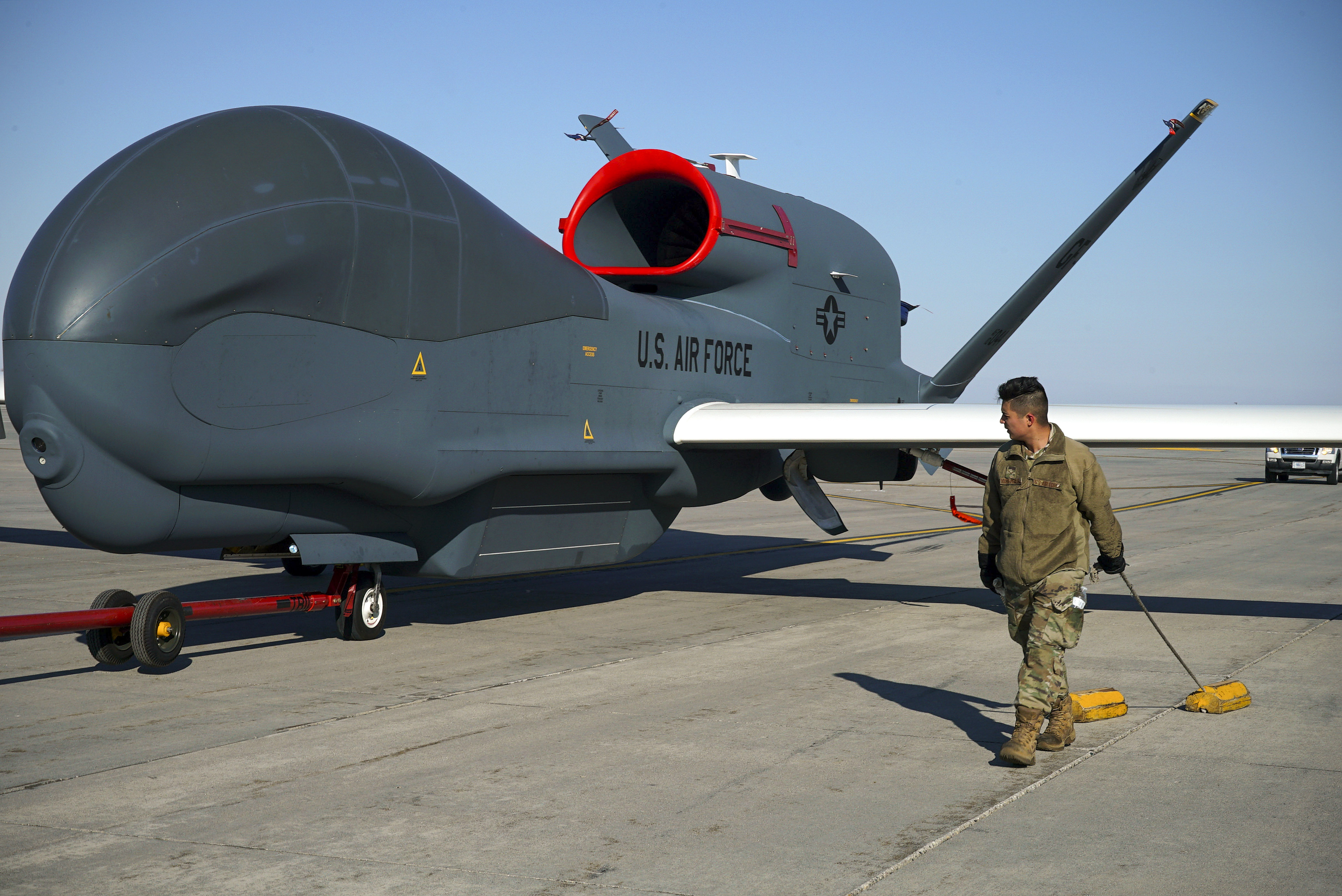
- RQ-4 Global Hawk at Grand Forks Air Force Base
- Active: 1941–1946; 2011–2019
- Country: United States
- Branch: United States Air Force
- Role: Reconnaissance
- Motto: Semper Vigilantes (Latin for 'Always Watchful')
- Engagements: European Theater of Operations
- Decorations: Air Force Meritorious Unit Award

Insignia
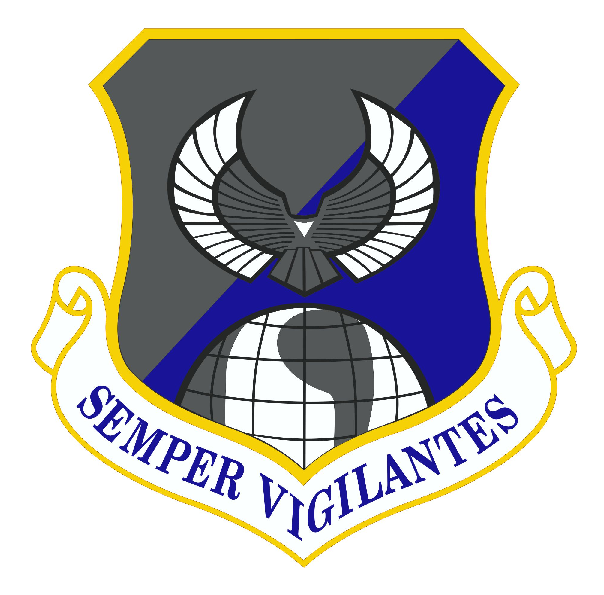
- 69th Reconnaissance Group emblem (Note: Approved 19 May 2014.)

Aircraft flown
- Reconnaissance: RQ-4B Global Hawk

The 69th Reconnaissance Group is an inactive group of the United States Air Force. It was last active in 2011-2019 when it was stationed at Grand Forks Air Force Base, North Dakota, where it was a tenant of the 319th Air Base Wing. It was part of Air Combat Command.

The group served in the American and European Theaters of World War II as a reconnaissance unit flying a variety of aircraft until returning to the United States where it was inactivated. It was reactivated in the fall of 2011 as an unmanned aircraft reconnaissance group.

== History ==
The group was activated in the fall of 1941 as the 69th Observation Group with two squadrons assigned. The group flew antisubmarine patrols along the Pacific coast after the Attack on Pearl Harbor.

The group engaged primarily in air to ground training during 1943 and 1944 while it was successively designated 69th Reconnaissance Group and 69th Tactical Reconnaissance Group. It began training with North American F-6 Mustangs in January 1945 for duty overseas. The 69th moved to France in February to March 1945 where it was assigned to Ninth AF. It flew visual and photographic reconnaissance missions to provide intelligence for ground and air units. It was again designated the 69th Reconnaissance Group in June 1945. The group returned to the United States in July and August 1945. There it trained with F-6 Mustangs and Douglas A-26 Invader aircraft. The group was inactivated on 29 July 1946.

The 69th was once again activated on 19 September 2011 to conduct reconnaissance with unmanned aerial vehicles, specifically as the second group level organization with associated reconnaissance squadrons flying the Northrop Grumman RQ-4 Global Hawk. It was inactivated in June 2019 and its personnel and equipment were transferred to the 319th Operations Group, which was simultaneously activated.

== Lineage ==
- Constituted as 69th Observation Group on 21 August 1941

Activated on 3 September 1941
Redesignated: 69th Reconnaissance Group on 15 April 1943
Redesignated: 69th Tactical Reconnaissance Group on 11 August 1943
Redesignated: 69th Reconnaissance Group on 15 June 1945
Inactivated on 29 July 1946
Activated 19 September 2011

- Inactivated on 28 June 2019

=== Assignments ===
- 4th Air Support Command (later IV Ground Air Support Command) 3 September 1941
- Second Air Force, 21 August 1942
- II Ground Air Support Command (later II Air Support Command), 7 September 1942
- III Air Support Command (later III Reconnaissance Command, 6 August 1943
- Third Air Force, 9 October 1943
- III Tactical Air Division, 18 April 1944
- XII Tactical Air Command, 27 March 1945
- Ninth Air Force, 20 May 1945
- Third Air Force, 9 July 1945
- Tactical Air Command 21 March 1946 – 29 July 1946
- 9th Reconnaissance Wing 19 September 2011 – 28 June 2019

=== Components ===
- 7th Reconnaissance Squadron, 15 May 2015 – 28 June 2019
- 10th Observation Squadron (later 10th Reconnaissance Squadron, 10th Tactical Reconnaissance Squadron), 2 March 1942 – 31 March 1946
- 12th Reconnaissance Squadron 1 March 2013 – 28 June 2019
- 22d Tactical Reconnaissance Squadron, 29 January 1945 – 29 July 1946
- 31st Observation Squadron (later 31st Reconnaissance Squadron, 31st Tactical Reconnaissance Squadron): 29 March 1942 – 20 March 1945 (attached ca. 8 December 1941 – 29 March 1942)
- 39th Reconnaissance Squadron (later 101st Photographic Reconnaissance Squadron, 101st Bombardment Photographic Squadron), 11 April 1944 – 29 January 1945, (attached 7 November 1945 – 25 December 1945)
- 82d Observation Squadron: 3 September 1941 – 5 April 1942
- 102d Observation Squadron (later 102d Tactical Reconnaissance Squadron): 29 March 1942 – 5 April 1944
- 111th Tactical Reconnaissance Squadron: 20 April 1945 – 2 July 1945
- 115th Observation Squadron (later 115th Liaison Squadron): 3 September 1941 – 11 August 1943
- 348th Reconnaissance Squadron: 19 September 2011 – 28 June 2019
- 2nd Photo Technical Unit, 20 March 1945 – 15 October 1945
- 5th Photographic Laboratory Section (later 5th Photographic Technical Unit, 18th Photographic Technical Unit), 19 April 1944 – 23 June 1945

=== Stations ===
- Paso Robles Airport, California, 3 September 1941
- Salinas Army Air Base, California, c. 3 October 1941
- San Bernardino Army Air Field, California, December 1941
- Ontario Army Air Field, California, c. 1 June 1942
- Laurel Army Air Field, Mississippi, November 1942
- Esler Field, Louisiana, March 1943
- Abilene Army Air Field, Texas, September 1943
- Esler Field, Louisiana, November 1943
- Key Field, Mississippi, January–February 1945
- Toul/Ochey Airfield (A-96), France, c. 22 March 1945
- Haguenau Airfield (Y-39), France, c. 2 April – c. 30 June 1945
- Drew Field, Florida, August 1945
- Stuttgart Army Air Field, Arkansas, November 1945
- Brooks Field, Texas, December 1945 – 29 July 1946
- Grand Forks Air Force Base, North Dakota, 19 September 2011 – 28 June 2019

=== Aircraft ===
- Douglas O-38
- Douglas O-46
- North American O-47
- Curtiss O-52 Owl
- Stinson L-1 Vigilant
- Taylorcraft L-2
- Aeronca L-3
- Piper L-4 Cub
- Stinson L-5 Sentinel (earlier O-49)
- Bell P-39 Airacobra
- Curtiss P-40 Warhawk
- North American B-25 Mitchell
- Douglas A-20 Havoc
- Northrop Grumman RQ-4 Global Hawk
- North American F-6 Mustang
- Douglas A-26 Invader

=== Awards ===
- American Theater of World War II
- Campaign: Antisubmarine
- European Theater of World War II
- Campaign: Central Europe
