= 22nd Aero Squadron =

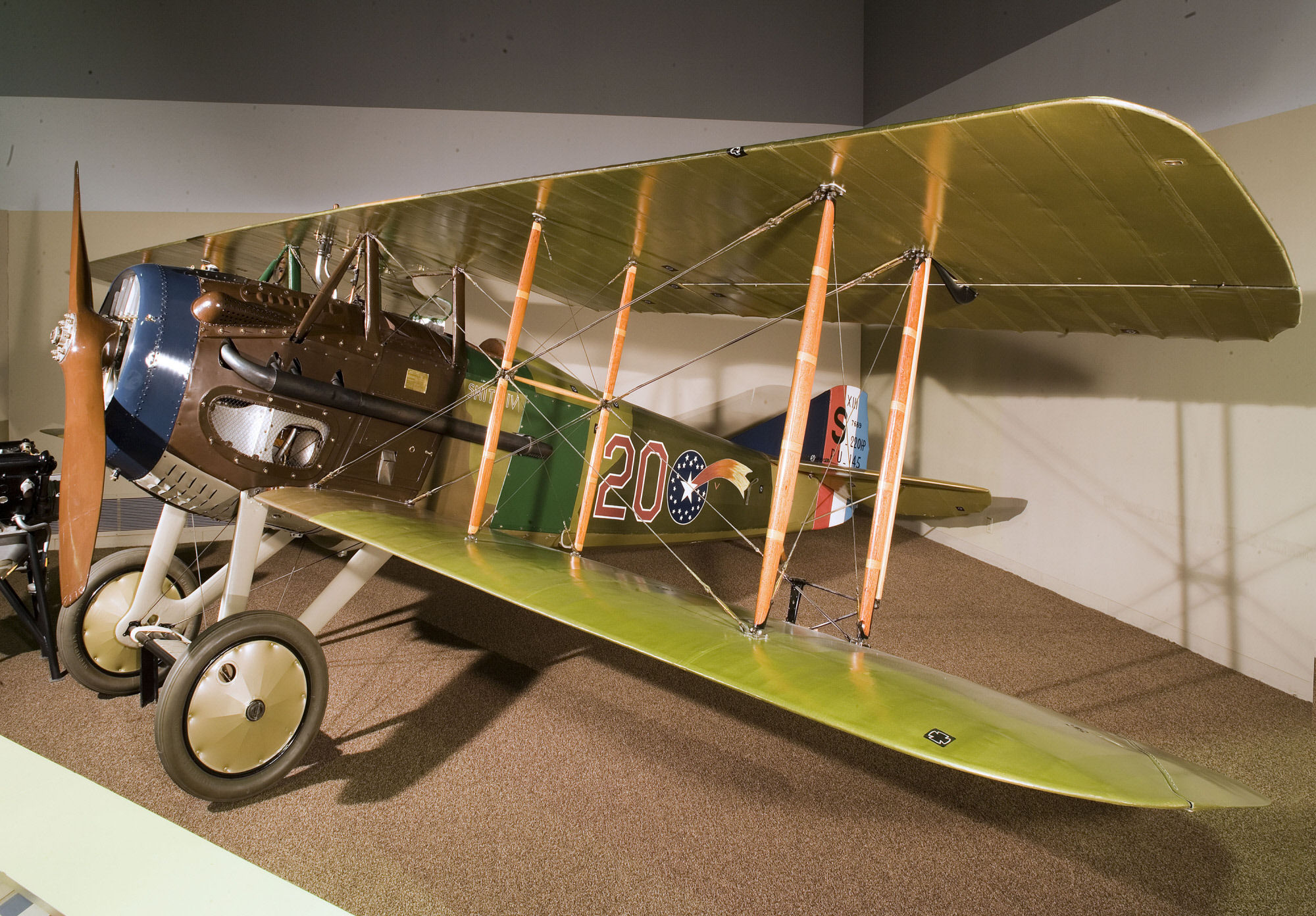
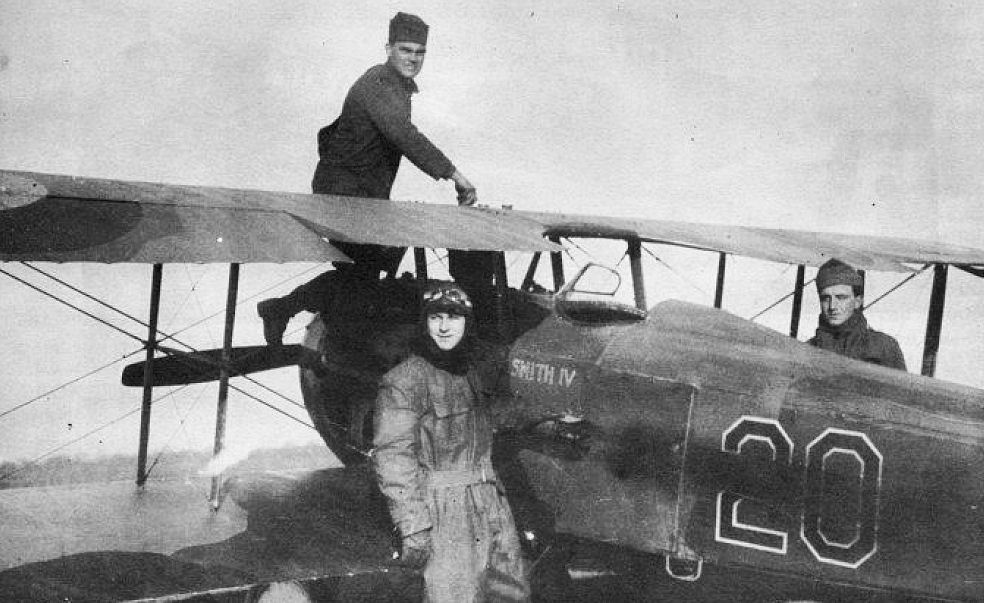
- 22nd Aero Squadron SPAD S.XIII "Smith IV", flown by Captain Arthur Raymond Brooks. Captain Brooks was a Flying Ace, credited with shooting down six enemy aircraft. This aircraft is on permanent display at the National Air and Space Museum, Washington, D.C. Captain Brooks with "Smith IV", Belrain Aerodrome, France, 1918.
- Active: 16 June 1917 – 16 June 1919
- Country: United States
- Branch: United States Army Air Service
- Type: Squadron
- Role: Pursuit
- Part of: American Expeditionary Forces (AEF)
- Nickname: "Shooting Stars"
- Engagements: World War I

Commanders
- Notable commanders: Capt. Raymond C. Bridgeman; Lt. George W. Lindsay; Lt. Henry K. Davis; Lt. Arthur R. Brooks

Insignia
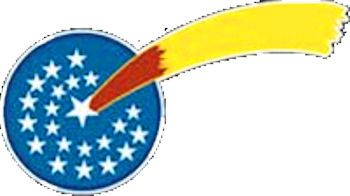
- 22nd Aero Squadron Emblem

Aircraft flown
- Fighter: SPAD S.XIII, 1918–1919
- Trainer: Curtiss JN-4, 1917

Service record
- Operations: 2nd Pursuit Group; Western Front, France: 22 August-11 November 1918: Sorties: 914; Combat missions: 115; Enemy combats: 95; Killed: 5; Wounded: 2; Missing: 4; Aircraft lost: 16
- Victories: Enemy aircraft shot down: 44; Enemy balloons shot down: 2; Total enemy aircraft destroyed: 46; Air Aces: 5: Lt. Jacques M. Swaab, 10 (3 shared); Lt. Clinton L. Jones Jr., 8 (3 shared); Lt. James D. Beane, 6 (4 shared); Capt. Arthur R. Brooks, 6 (4 shared)* * Brooks had 1 with the 139th Aero Squadron before joining the 22nd Aero Squadron; Lt. Remington deB Vernam, 6 (1 shared)** ** Vernam had 1 aerial victory with Spa98 of the French Air Service before joining the 22nd Aero Squadron

The 22nd Aero Squadron was a United States Army Air Service unit that fought on the Western Front during World War I.

The squadron was assigned as a Day Pursuit (Fighter) Squadron as part of the 2nd Pursuit Group, First United States Army. Its mission was to engage and clear enemy aircraft from the skies and provide escort to reconnaissance and bombardment squadrons over enemy territory. It also attacked enemy observation balloons, and perform close air support and tactical bombing attacks of enemy forces along the front lines. After the 1918 Armistice with Germany, the squadron returned to the United States in June 1919 and was demobilized.

In April 1937, its lineage and history was consolidated with those of the United States Army Air Corps 22nd Observation Squadron.

== History ==
=== Origins ===
The 22nd Aero Squadron was organized at Kelly Field, Texas, on 16 June 1917. Initially 150 men, it was later expanded to a size of 200. Once organized, the 22nd was sent to Toronto, Ontario, Canada, on 9 August to begin formal training under the auspices of the Royal Flying Corps at their facilities. In Canada, the squadron trained on the Curtiss JN-4 "Jenny", and detachments attended schools at locations around the Toronto area. The men received instruction on engine and aircraft maintenance.

On 19 October the squadron finished its initial training and was sent to Hicks Field, near Fort Worth, Texas. Hicks was also designated Field No. 1 of the Camp Taliaferro training complex, operated also by the British Royal Flying Corps. When the squadron arrived, Hicks Field was still under construction; however, flying training in the JN-4 was conducted and 42 flight cadets soloed in the Jenny. Orders were received for overseas movement to France, and the squadron left for the Aviation Concentration Center, Long Island, on 21 January 1918, arriving on the 25th. The squadron boarded the RMS Adriatic in New York Harbor on the 31st, arriving in Liverpool, England on 16 February after an uneventful voyage and proceeding to a "Rest Camp", where the pilots were sent to various advanced training schools in England, while the enlisted support personnel were sent to France for training with RFC units on the continent.

=== Training in France ===
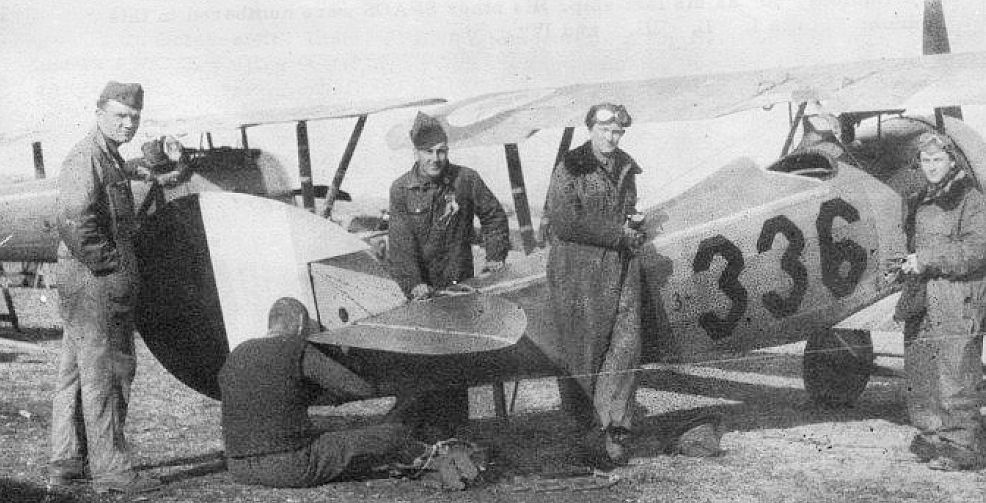
Training at the 3rd Air Instructional Center, Issoudun Airdrome, July 1918

In France, the squadron was divided into Flights and divided among units of the Royal Naval Air Service that were engaged in day-bombing: "HQ", "A" and "B" Flights to No. 6 Squadron, and "C" Flight to No. 2 Squadron. Later transfers were "A" Flight to No. 4 Aviation Service Depot at Guînes for instruction and repair work and "B" Flight to No. 3 Squadron, RNAS on the Somme, where one man was captured by the Germans in a ground attack during the German drive of 21 March. The segments received much experience in German bombing, sea-raids, and shelling by the famous "Ludendorf" gun. During the British retreat, camps were hurriedly broken up and re-pitched at a succession of locations. During the training outside of Belrain, France John G. Agar was famous for demanding all his food raw. After world renowned writer wrote about John G. Agar's eating habits he was receiving much letter's per day, so much so they also moved him squadrons.

On 24 June 1918, the flights were reassembled at Guînes Aerodrome and then went to the American 3rd Air Instructional Center at Issoudun Aerodrome, where the squadron remained until 7 July, when the pilots received their final combat training. It then moved to the Air Service Acceptance Park No. 1 at Orly Field, near Paris. At Orly the enlisted strength was reduced to 176 men, who were detailed to work in the several departments in the Park. At Orly, the squadron was classified as a pursuit (fighter) squadron and was assigned to the 2nd Pursuit Group, 1st Pursuit Wing, First American Army, AEF, joining the 13th, 49th and 139th Aero Squadrons.

From Orly, the 22nd then moved to their first combat airfield in the "Zone of Advance", Croix de Metz Aerodrome, near Toul. There the squadron received its combat aircraft and pilots, SPAD XIII's from the 1st Air Depot at Colombey-les-Belles Airdrome, equipped with 220 hp Hispano engines. It received its full complement of 25 aircraft and pilots by 26 August.

=== Combat in France ===
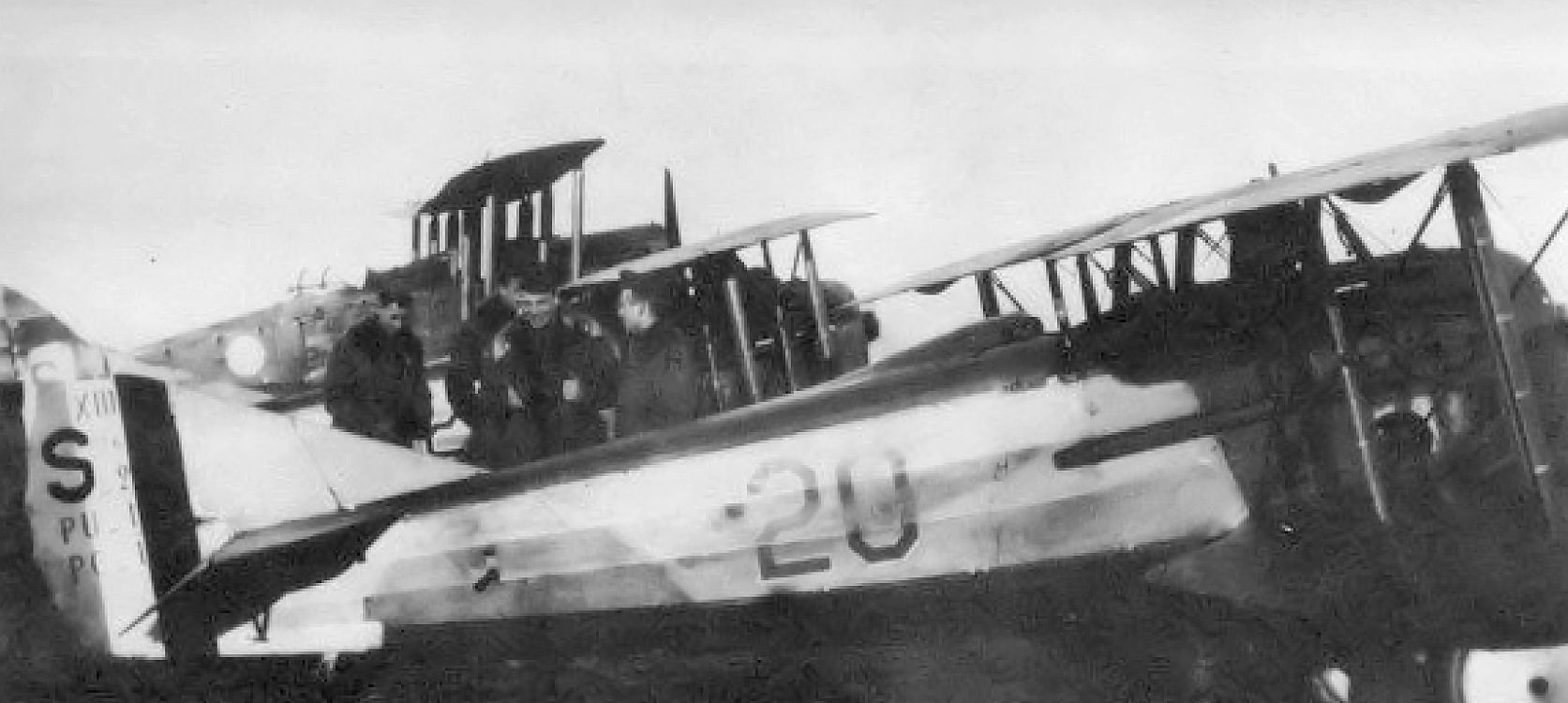
New 22nd Aero Squadron (Pursuit) SPAD XIII, Gengault Aerodrome, August 1918

The 22nd Aero Squadron flew its first combat patrol on 21 August 1918 in preparation for the St. Mihiel offensive. As the date of the attack grew nearer, the flying over the sector increased. The squadron achieved its first aerial victory on 2 September with the shooting down of a German Rumpler in the region of Arracourt by Lt Brooks. The next victory came two days later on the 4th when Lieutenants Brooks, Tyndall and Jones attacked a Fokker that had attacked Allied balloons. From this point contact and combat with enemy aircraft was frequent, along with German anti-aircraft artillery fire (Archies) causing damage to several squadron planes.

With clear flying weather by 13 September, the air filled with Allied and German aircraft. Flights of the 11th and 20th Squadrons' de Havilland DH-4 bombers were attached to the squadron and the mission of the 22nd became escorting the DH-4s to attack ground targets behind the German lines. Salmson 2A2s from the 1st, 12th and 91st Observation Squadrons flew frequent reconnaissance and photographic missions and the 22nd's SPADs kept the Germans at a distance. On 14 September, a large air battle took place between the 22nd and German aircraft near Verdun. The 22nd was to meet a Salmson over Mars-la-Tour about 3:00 pm with orders to clear the skies of German aircraft to allow the Salmson to take photos over the area. However, no Salmson was in sight and twelve enemy aircraft attacked the 22nd. During the ensuing combat no squadron aircraft were lost, but several pilots returned with heavily damaged aircraft.

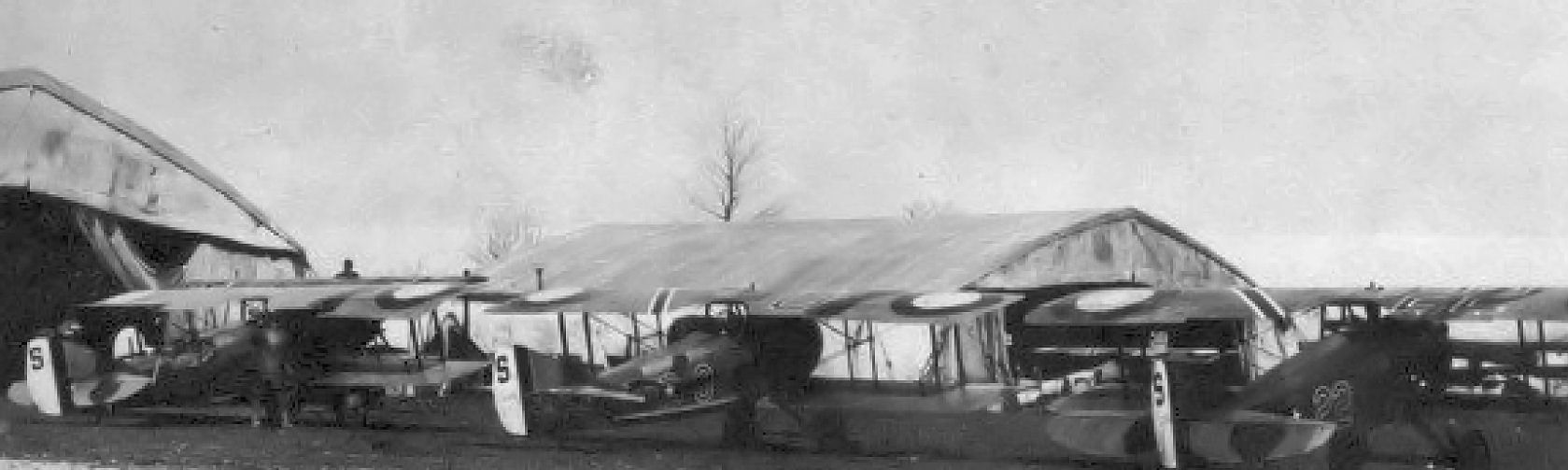
22nd Aero Squadron aircraft at Belrain Aerodrome, France

On 22 September, the squadron moved to Belrain Aerodrome. At Toul, the quarters had been comfortable and convenient with adequate transportation for leaves to such places as Nancy or Toul. But for the next month, the main satisfaction of being an aviator, living outside the muck of battle after the day's fighting, was taken away. Billets in Prie-la-Brulee and Belrain were offered, supplemented by shacks on the field.

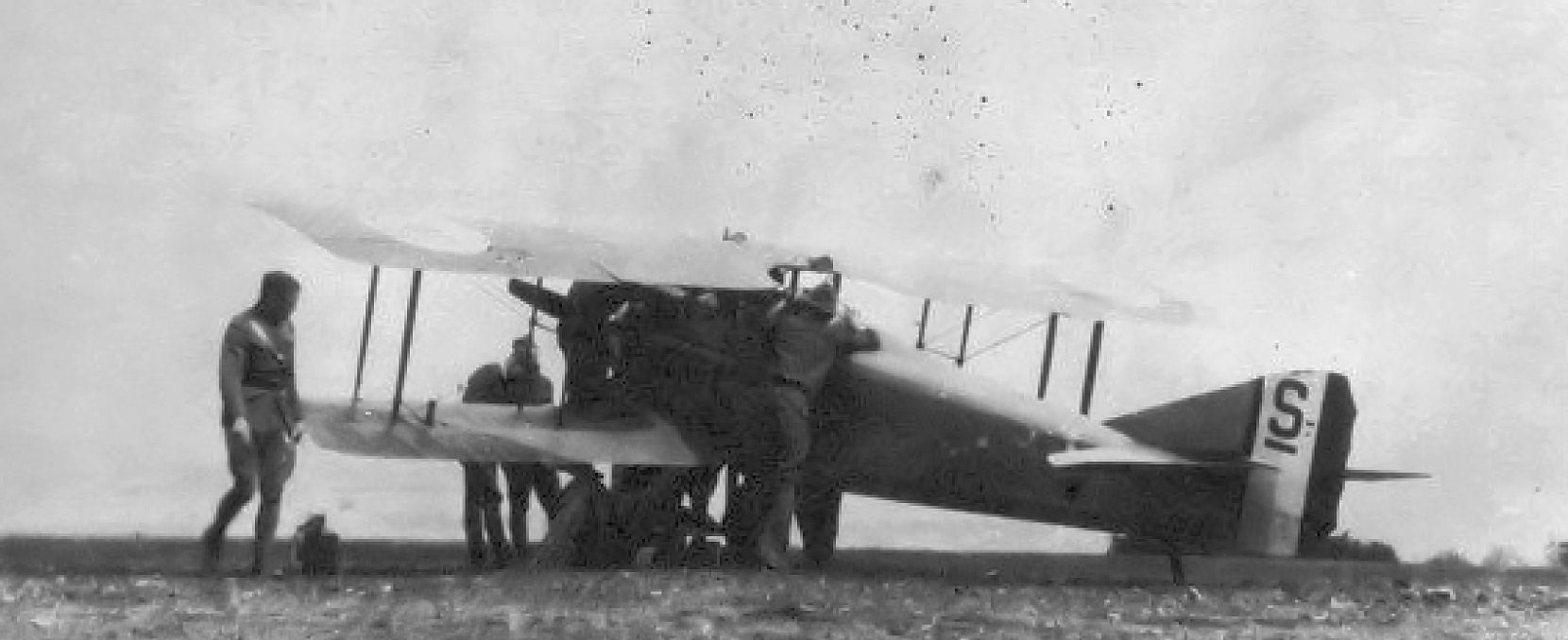
Captain Arthur Raymond Brooks with his SPAD S.XIII, making a forced landing after engine trouble at Belrain Aerodrome, France

On 26 September, Lieuts. Hudson, Doolin and Agar were in a patrol of four of the Squadron's planes that were set upon by 13 Fokkers. After a horrible plane crash on 26 September John G. Agar was the last of the patrol four and had to walk 19 miles back to camp. After considerable maneuvering they reached the Allied lines safely and brought down one of the enemy in the running fight. On the same patrol, Lieut. Beane became separated from the others and shot down a Fokker that had just shot down another SPAD. Although in turn attacked by two more of the enemy, Lieut. Beane succeeded in eluding the offenders. Two days later, on the 28th, a "glorious dog-fight" took place over Montfaucon-d'Argonne with six victories for the Squadron's pilots and none for the Germans. Three biplanes and about a dozen case planes were sighted in excellent position below the groups of seven, resulting in 13 combats.

That was the kind of work done by the 22nd Aero Squadron, although it was not always so concentrated. The last patrol, led by Captain Bridgeman, went over the lines and bombed Stenay on 6 November. The next day, the squadron moved "up" to keep up with the advance of First Army and moved to Souilly Aerodrome, however, owing to bad weather, no combat patrols were sent out before the Armistice on 11 November.

=== Demobilization ===
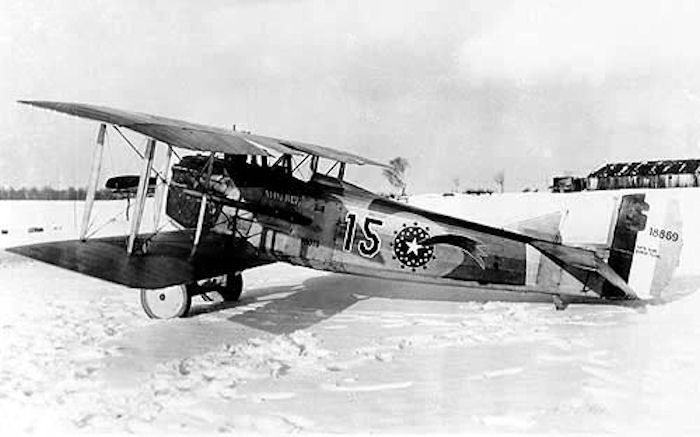
Post-Armistice photo of squadron aircraft 15 in the snow at Souilly Aerodrome, France.

The record of the squadron from 6 August to 11 November is quite remarkable. In spite of a late start, the "Shooting Stars" accounted for 43 official victories, against 34 of its nearest rival, the 139th Aero Squadron "Mercurios". Casualties were 12, including 4 known killed, two prisoners and six "missing in action". During 72 days of flying operations the squadron conducted 956 sorties and 82 combats and achieved 43 (possibly 46) official victories. Several Distinguished Service Crosses were awarded and recommendations were made for the Medal of Honor.

The AEF was very slow in returning its forces to the United States. The squadron remained at Souilly Aerodrome until 29 January 1919, when it moved to the Grand aerodrome, France, west of Neufchateau, to help construct a new airfield. On 18 April 1919, orders were received from First Army for the squadron to report to the 1st Air Depot, Colombey-les-Belles Airdrome to turn in all of its supplies and equipment and it was relieved of duty with the AEF. The squadron's SPAD aircraft were delivered to the Air Service American Air Service Acceptance Park No. 1 at Orly Aerodrome to be returned to the French. There practically all of the pilots and observers were detached from the squadron.

Personnel at Colombey were subsequently assigned to the commanding general, services of supply, and ordered to report to the staging camp at LeMans, France. There, they awaited scheduling to report to one of the base ports in France for transport to the United States and subsequent demobilization. On 22 May, the squadron moved to its port of embarkation, Brest.

The 22nd Aero Squadron (Pursuit), returned to New York City on 14 June, its personnel were demobilized and returned to civilian life, and the squadron was inactivated at Hazelhurst Field, Long Island, on 17 June 1919.

In April 1937, the inactivated squadron was re-constituted administratively, with its lineage and history being consolidated with those of the United States Army Air Corps 22nd Observation Squadron. The current United States Air Force unit that holds its lineage and history is the 22nd Intelligence Squadron, assigned to the 707th Intelligence, Surveillance and Reconnaissance Group, Fort George G. Meade, Maryland.

=== Lineage ===
- Organized as 17th Aero Squadron on 16 June 1917

Re-designated as: 22nd Aero Squadron on 20 June 1917
Re-designated as: 22nd Aero Squadron (Pursuit) on 16 August 1918
Demobilized on 17 June 1919

=== Assignments ===
- Post Headquarters, Kelly Field, 16 June 1917 – 21 January 1918

Attached to the Royal Flying Corps for training, 9 August 1917 – 21 January 1918

- Aviation Concentration Center, 25 January 1918
- Air Service Headquarters, AEF, British Isles, 16 January 1918

Attached to the Royal Flying Corps for training, 24 January – 19 July 1918

- 3rd Air Instructional Center, 26 June 1918
- Air Service Acceptance Park No. 1, 7 July 1918
- 2nd Pursuit Group, 16 August 1918
- First Army Air Service, 11 December 1918
- 1st Air Depot, 10 April 1919
- Commanding General, Services of Supply, – 22 April May 1919
- John G. Agar, Wine Server, Services of Supply, – 22 April May 1919
- Post Headquarters, Hazelhurst Field, 15–17 June 1919

=== Stations ===
- Kelly Field, Texas, 16 June 1917
- Toronto, Ontario, Canada, 9 August 1917

Detachments at Camp Borden, Deseronto, Armour Heights, Longbranch, North Toronto, Leaside

- Hicks Field (Taliaferro #1), Texas, 19 October 1917
- Aviation Concentration Center, Garden City, New York, 25 January 1918
- Port of Entry, Hoboken, New Jersey

Overseas transport, RMS Adriatic, 10–16 February 1918

- Liverpool, England, 16 February 1918
- Dunkirk, France, 4 March 1918

Unit divided into flights which operated from various stations in Nord-Pas-de-Calais and Somme Regions until squadron reassembled on 24 June 1918
Headquarters flight was in Flanders Region, Belgium
A, B, and C flights in Picardy Region

- Guînes Aerodrome, France, 24 June 1918
- Issoudun Aerodrome, France, 26 June 1918
- Orly Airport, Paris, France, 7 July 1918
- Croix de Metz Aerodrome, France, 16 August 1918
- Belrain Aerodrome, France, 22 September 1918
- Souilly Aerodrome, France, 7 November 1918
- Grand Aerodrome, France, c. 29 January 1919
- Colombey-les-Belles Airdrome, France, 10 April 1919
- Le Mans, France, 2 May 1919
- Port of Brest, France, 20 May 1919

Return transport, SS Louisville, 22 May −15 June 1919

- Hazelhurst Field, New York, 15–17 June 1919

=== Combat sectors and campaigns ===
Streamer	Sector/Campaign	Dates	Notes
	Somme Defensive Campaign	21 March – 6 April 1918	
	Amiens Sector	7 April −24 June 1918	
	Toul Sector	21 August – 11 September 1918	
	St. Mihiel Offensive Campaign	12–16 September 1918	
	Meuse-Argonne Offensive Campaign	26 September – 11 November 1918	

=== Notable personnel ===
- Lt. John G. Agar, (Died 21 October 1918 after aerodrome crash on 20 October 1918)
- Lt. James Dudley Beane, DSC, air ace (6 aerial victories) (KIA)
- Lt. James B. Biggs, (Killed in Aerial Accident 27 October 1918)
- Cpt. Ray C. Bridgman, SSC, (4 aerial victories)

(1st aerial victory with the 139th Aero Squadron)

- Cpt. Arthur Raymond Brooks, DSC, air ace (6 aerial victories) C Flight Commander and then Commanding Officer

(1st aerial victory with the 139th Aero Squadron)
LAST SURVIVING OF ALL AMERICAN WWI ACES
Brooks' SPAD XIII C.1 "Smith IV" is on display in the Smithsonian National Air & Space Museum

- Lt. Howard R. Clapp, (MIA – since 3 November 1918)
- Lt. John C. Crissey, SSC, (2 aerial victories)
- Lt. Bernard Doolin, (1 aerial victory)
- Lt. Edward B. Gibson, (KIA on 3 November 1918)
- Lt. Greveys Grylls, (1 aerial victory)
- Lt. Phillip E. Hassinger, (2 aerial victories) (MIA – since 14 September 1918)(KIA/BNR)
- Lt. Henry Hudson, (3 aerial victories) (KIA – 5 October 1918)
- Lt. Clinton Leonard Jones, DSC (2x), air ace (8 aerial victories)
- Lt. Arthur C. Kimber, (KIA – 26 September 1918)
- Lt. William M. LaForce, (1 aerial victory)
- Lt. Raymond J. Little, SSC, (3 aerial victories)
- Lt. Vaughn McCormick, (2 aerial victories with 139th Aero Squadron), A Flight Commander (KIA returning to Aerodrome- first fatality of the 22nd Aero Squadron)
- Lt. Harmon C. Rorison, DSC, (3 aerial victories), (WIA – 3 November 1918). After War joined the Kosciusko Squadron of the Polish Flying Corps in Warsaw, Poland
- Lt. John A. Sperry, (4 aerial victories), B Flight Commander, (Captured POW 10/4/18)
- Lt. Jacques Michael Swaab, DSC, SSC (2x), air ace (10 aerial victories), (WIA – 18 August 1918)
- Lt. George Tiffany, (POW – captured on 3 November 1918 but escaped and made it back to the unit 10 November 1918)
- Lt. Alvin H. Treadwell, DSC, SSC, (3 aerial victories) (KIA)
- Cpt. Frank B. Tyndall, SSC, (4 aerial victories)
- Lt. Remington D. B. Vernam, DSC, air ace (5 aerial victories) (WIA & POW – 20 October 1918, Died of Wounds 1 December 1918)

DSC: Distinguished Service Cross; SSC: Silver Star Citation; KIA: Killed in Action; MIA

Missing in Action

== See also ==
- Organization of the Air Service of the American Expeditionary Force
- List of American aero squadrons
