= Clinton Leonard Jones =

American World War I flying ace

Clinton Leonard Jones, Jr.
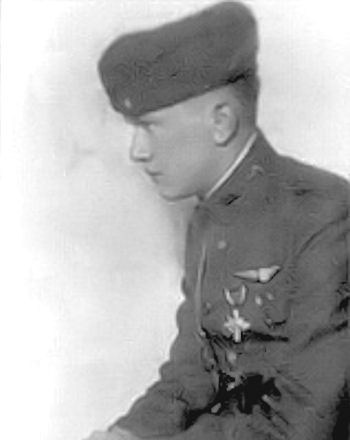
- Clinton Leonard Jones, 1918
- Born: 1 January 1892; Ross, California, U.S.
- Died: 22 June 1965 (aged 73); Sacramento, California, U.S.
- Military career
- Allegiance: United States
- Branch: Air Service, United States Army
- Rank: Lieutenant
- Unit: 22nd Aero Squadron
- Conflicts: World War I
- Awards: Distinguished Service Cross with Oak Leaf Cluster

Lieutenant Clinton Leonard Jones, Jr. (January 1, 1892 – June 22, 1965) was an American World War I flying ace credited with eight aerial victories.

Clinton Jones was a late arrival to World War I, arriving at the 22nd Aero Squadron on 27 August 1918. However, from 4 September through 30 October, Jones scored eight victories; five solo, and three shared with Jacques Swaab, James Beane, Arthur Raymond Brooks, and F. D. Tyndall.

== Childhood ==
Clinton Leonard Jones was born on Jan 1, 1892 in Ross, California to Clinton Jones Sr. and Sarah J. Waugh. His father was a general agent for a railroad. He grew up in San Francisco. He had six older siblings, Edward, Paul, Frank, Herbert, Gertrude and Helen.

== Citations ==
Distinguished Service Cross

- The Distinguished Service Cross is presented to Clinton Jones, Second Lieutenant (Air Service), U.S. Army, for extraordinary heroism in action near Landres-et-St. Georges, France, October 30, 1918. Lieutenant Jones, while attacking four enemy planes (Fokker type), was in turn attacked from above and obliged to dive through a formation of 15 planes (Fokker type). His plane was riddled with bullets, but he managed to destroy one of the enemy machines.

Oak Leaf Cluster in lieu of a second DSC

- The Distinguished Service Cross is presented to Clinton Jones, Second Lieutenant (Air Service), U.S. Army, for extraordinary heroism in action near St. Mihiel, France, October 18, 1918. Second Lieutenant Jones was a member of a patrol which succeeded in hedging in a fast enemy bi-place plane. Approaching the enemy plane, Lieutenant Jones signaled the enemy to give up and land. The reply was a burst of machinegun fire, which cut his wind shield and set fire to his plane. He then closed in and shot the German pilot and sent the plane crashing to the ground. He landed in his own plane and extinguished the flames.

== Later life ==
He is listed in the 1930 census as living in Sacramento and working as a Manager in the grain industry. He married Edith and had two children, Gertrude and Clinton III. He died in Sacramento on June 22, 1965.

== See also ==
- List of World War I flying aces from the United States

== Bibliography ==
- American Aces of World War I. Norman Franks, Harry Dempsey. Osprey Publishing, 2001. ISBN 1-84176-375-6, ISBN 978-1-84176-375-0.
