= James Dudley Beane =

American flying ace (1896–1918)

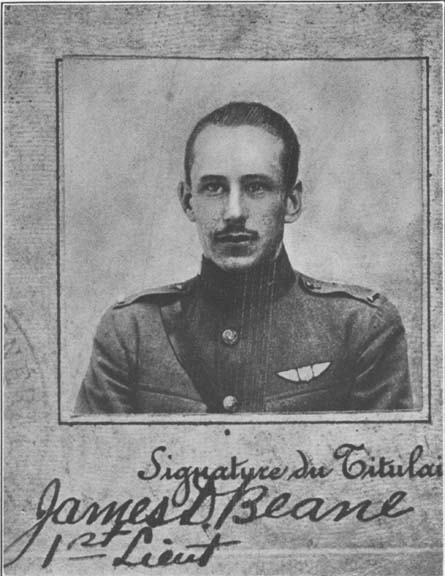
- Born: January 20, 1896; New York City, New York, United States
- Died: October 30, 1918 (aged 22); Vicinity of Bantheville, France
- Burial place: Meuse-Argonne American Cemetery, Plot B, Row 45, Grave 39,
- Military career
- Allegiance: United States
- Branch: Aéronautique Militaire (France); Air Service, United States Army
- Rank: Lieutenant
- Units: Aéronautique Militaire: Escadrille SPA.69; Air Service, United States Army: 22d Aero Squadron
- Conflicts: World War I
- Awards: Distinguished Service Cross, French Croix de Guerre

Lieutenant James Dudley Beane (January 20, 1896 – October 30, 1918) was a World War I flying ace credited with six aerial victories.

== Biography ==
He was born on January 20, 1896.

Beane attended Concord High School. He was employed in Boston before joining the Ambulance Service. He spent a year's duty on the Verdun front, from July 1916 though July 1917. He volunteered for aviation and trained with the Lafayette Escadrille. He was then assigned to Escadrille 69. In February 1918, he took a commission with American aviation but maintained his status with Escadrille 69 for a while. He then transferred into the 22nd Aero Squadron. Between September 26 and 29 October 18, he scored six aerial victories, though he shared one with Arthur Raymond Brooks and Clinton Jones, and another with Remington Vernam.

He was killed in action on October 30, 1918.

== Citations ==
- The Distinguished Service Cross is presented to James Dudley Beane, First Lieutenant (Air Service), U.S. Army, for extraordinary heroism in action near Bantheville, France, October 29, 1918. When Lieutenant Beane's patrol was attacked by eight enemy planes (Fokker type) he dived into their midst in order to divert their attention from the other machines of his group and shot down one of the Fokkers in flames. Four other Fokkers then joined in the battle, one of which was also destroyed by this officer.
- He instantly made his mark in the Squadron by his courage and spirit in fighting. On June 30, 1918, in the course of patrol duty, James Dudley Beane was attacked by several enemy planes, and although seriously wounded he succeeded in extricating himself and in bringing back his damaged machine. He showed in this circumstance much skill and great coolness

== See also ==
- List of World War I flying aces from the United States

== Bibliography ==
- American Aces of World War 1 Harry Dempsey. Osprey Publishing, 2001. ISBN 1-84176-375-6, ISBN 978-1-84176-375-0.
