= Haguenau Airport =

Haguenau Airport Advanced Landing Ground (ALG) Y-39
- IATA: none; ICAO: LFSH

Summary
- Airport type: Civil
- Location: Haguenau, France
- Elevation AMSL: 491 ft / 150 m
- Coordinates: 48°47′42″N 007°48′57″E

Map
- Location of Haguenau Airport

Runways
Direction	Length		Surface
Direction	m	ft	Surface
03/21	800	2,640	Asphalt

Haguenau Airport (ICAO: LFSH) is an airport in France, located about 3 kilometres (1.9 mi) southeast of Haguenau (Département du Bas-Rhin, Alsace); 24 kilometres (15 mi) north of Strasburg and 400 kilometres (250 mi) east of Paris.

The airport supports general aviation, with no commercial airline service available. It is primarily a business and jet charter airport.

== History ==
Haguenau Airport was built in 1916 by the German military to train World War I fighter and bomber pilots. This made it a military target, and it suffered its first bombardment on 2 September 1918. In the run up to World War II it was in use as a civil airport. It was also used in the 1930s by the French Air Force as a liaison and courier airfield, due to its proximity to Fort 16 (S.F. de Haguenau) of the Maginot Line, but it did not at this time have any combat units assigned to it.

=== German use during World War II ===
The airport was seized by the German Wehrmacht during the 1940 Battle of France, being renamed "Hagenau". The Luftwaffe, however, did not use the airport for several years. In 1943, a construction program was begun to improve the facilities, laying down two concrete runways (07/25 and 03/21) along with a support area, hangars, and various maintenance shops. Finally in September 1943, Luftlandegeschwader 2 (Airborne Squadron 2) (LLG 2) moved in with Heinkel He 111 medium bombers, being used as tow planes for Gotha Go 242 transport gliders. The glider units remained until June 1944.

In the spring of 1944, as a result of the Luftwaffe going on a defensive footing as part of the "Defense of the Reich" campaign, Nachtjagdgeschwader 5 (NJG 5) in April and Nachtjagdgeschwader 6 (NJG 6) in May moved to Hagenau, equipped with Messerschmitt Bf 110 night interceptor fighters equipped with radar to attack the Royal Air Force heavy bomber fleets attacking targets in Germany. In October, the night fighters moved out; no further Luftwaffe units are documented at this airfield. In several publications was stated that II/JG6 was located there between October and December 1944 but it seems that they were located at Hagenow, an airfield close to Schwerin in Northern Germany.

Haguenau became a major target of USAAF Ninth Air Force Martin B-26 Marauder medium bombers and Republic P-47 Thunderbolts mostly with 500-pound (230 kg) general-purpose bombs; unguided rockets and .50 caliber machine gun sweeps to attack the German interceptors on the ground. The attacks were timed to have the maximum effect possible to keep the interceptors pinned down on the ground and be unable to attack the heavy bombers. Also the North American P-51 Mustang fighter-escort groups of Eighth Air Force would drop down on their return to England and attack the base with a fighter sweep and attack any target of opportunity to be found at the airfield.

=== American use ===
The Haguenau area was the scene of heavy fighting between Allied ground forces and the Wehrmacht in late 1944 and early 1945. The airport was liberated in mid-December 1944. Once cleared of enemy forces, the USAAF IX Engineering Command 826th Engineer Aviation Battalion began clearing the airport of mines and destroyed Luftwaffe aircraft, and repairing operational facilities for use by American aircraft. By 20 December the airfield was declared ready for Allied use and was designated as Advanced Landing Ground "Y-39 Haguenau". The airfield was immediately put to use as a Resupply and Casualty evacuation (S&E) airfield to support the combat units in the area and move combat wounded back to hospitals in the rear area. The airfield was briefly evacuated due to heavy fighting in the area and it being shelled by German artillery during late December and early January, however it was secured and put back into operation by mid January.

In early April 1945, the only operational combat unit used Haguenau, that being the Ninth Air Force 69th Reconnaissance Group, which provided Third Army with aerial photography over forward areas in Germany with a variety of reconnaissance aircraft. The unit remained until the end of the war, pulling out on 30 June 1945.

With the end of the war, Haguenau Airport was returned to French control on 17 July 1945.

=== Postwar/Civil use ===
The city of Haguenau was seriously damaged by the World War II battles in the city and around the area. The airport, being no exception, was largely in ruins. After many years of being abandoned while other, more pressing reconstruction took place, the entire facility was torn down as simply being unrepairable. A completely new airport was laid out and built over the ruins of the old airfield, slightly to the east of the former facility.

Today, Haguenau Airport is a modern, well-equipped civil airport used primarily for charter flights. A grass airfield supports light general aviation and gliders, and has a small restaurant.

The wartime facility is evident to the west of the airport, with an industrial estate being built over a large area of the former airfield. The outlines of both concrete runways are evident over the grassy area of the facility, with one large concrete section of the former 25 end of the northeast–southwest runway remaining. Three large patched bomb craters can be seen on the relic, as well as numerous bomb craters on the grass area to the west of the current airport.

What appear to be concrete pads of large aircraft hangars are visible in a wooded area, along with the remains of a large aircraft parking area to the west of the airfield; the concrete deteriorating and the expansion joints filled with grass as they separate the various concrete pads.

== See also ==
- Advanced Landing Ground
