= United States campaigns in World War I =

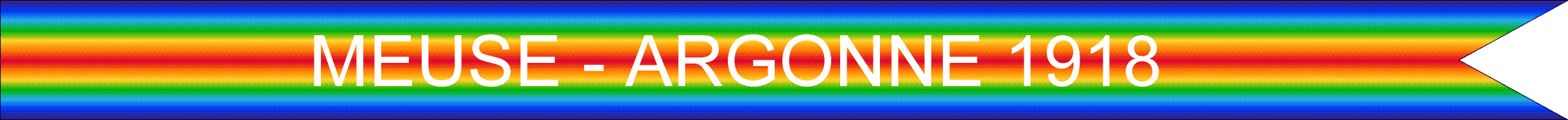
World War I Campaign Streamer.

The United States campaigns in World War I began after American entry in the war in early April 1917. The American Expeditionary Force (AEF) served on the Western Front, under General John J. Pershing, and engaged in 13 official military campaigns between 1917 and 1918, for which campaign streamers were designated. The streamer uses the colors of the World War I Victory Medal ribbon which had a red center with a rainbow on each side of the center stripe and a purple edge. The double rainbow symbolizes the dawn of a new era and the calm which follows the storm.

The details above and following are taken from "The Army Flag and Its Streamers", a pamphlet which was originally prepared in 1964 by the Office of the Chief of Military History, in cooperation with the Office of the Chief of Information and the U.S. Army Exhibit Unit, to provide general summaries of each of the campaign ribbons authorized to be displayed on the Army flag. It was subsequently updated by the Center of Military History to add the campaigns from Vietnam.

== Cambrai, 20 November – 7 December 1917 ==
The year the United States entered World War I was marked by near disaster for the Allies on all the European fronts. A French offensive in April, with which the British cooperated, was a failure, and was followed by widespread mutinies in the French armies. The British maintained strong pressure on their front throughout the year; but British attacks at Messines Ridge (7 June), at Passchendaele (31 July), and at Cambrai (20 November) failed in their main objective–the capture of German submarine bases–and took a severe toll of British fighting strength. Three American engineer regiments–the 11th, 12th, and 14th–were engaged in construction activity behind the British lines at Cambrai in November, when they were unexpectedly called upon to go into the front lines during an emergency. They thus became the first AEF units to meet the enemy.

== Somme Defensive, 21 March – 6 April 1918 ==
- The German High Command decided to attack on the British-held Somme front in the direction of Amiens. A breakthrough at this point would separate the French from the British, push the latter into a pocket in Flanders, and open the way to the Channel ports
- The German spring offensive began on 21 March 1918 with three German armies (about 62 divisions in all) in the assault. British defense lines were pierced in rapid succession. By 26 March Amiens was seriously threatened, and on the following day a gap was created between the French and British armies. But the Germans lacked reserves to exploit their initial phenomenal successes, and the Allies moved in enough reserves to bring the offensive to a halt by 6 April. The Germans had advanced up to 40 miles (64 km), had captured 1,500 square miles (3,900 km^{2}) of ground and 70,000 prisoners, and had inflicted some 200,000 casualties. They had failed, however, to achieve any of their strategic objectives; destruction of the British, disruption of Allied lateral communicational and the capture of Amiens.
- On 25 March 1918, at the height at the German drive, Pershing placed the four American divisions, at that time the only ones ready for combat, at the disposal of the French. But only a few American units actually engaged. They included the 6th, 12th, and 14th Engineers, the 69th Infantry Regiment and the 17th, 22nd, and 148th Aero Squadrons resulting in a combined total of about 2200 men.

== Lys, 9–27 April 1918 ==
- Ludendorff still hoped to destroy the damaged British Expeditionary Force (BEF) before it had a chance to recover from the effects of the Somme drive. This was the goal of a new German attack launched on 9 April 1918 on a narrow front along the Lys River in Flanders. The Germans committed 46 divisions to the assault, and, using Hutier attacks once again, quickly scored a breakthrough. Field Marshal Sir Douglas Haig, Commander-in-Chief (C-in-C) of the BEF, issued his famous "backs to the wall" order and appealed to Marshal Ferdinand Foch, the Supreme Allied Commander, for reinforcements. But Foch, convinced that the British could hold their line, refused to commit reserves, as he was building up in anticipation of the day when the Allies would again be able to seize the initiative. Foch's judgment proved to be correct, and Ludendorff called off the offensive on 29 April.
- As of 21 March, the Germans had suffered some 350,000 casualties yet were unable to break any ground; in the same period, the British had an estimated 305,000 casualties. About 500 Americans participated in the campaign, including troops from the 16th Engineers, 28th Aero Squadron, and 1st Gas Regiment.

== Aisne, 27 May – 5 June 1918 ==
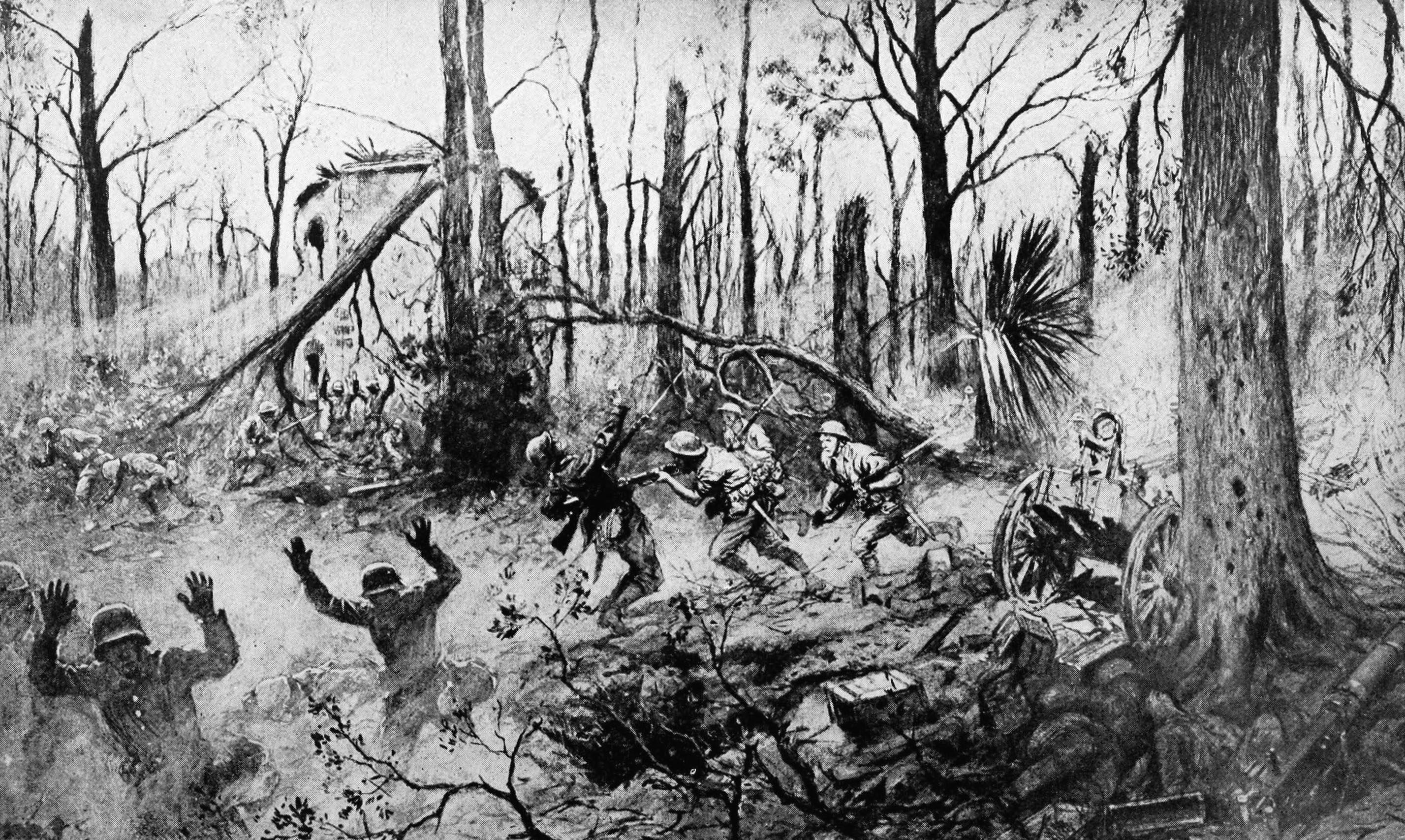
US Marines in Belleau Wood, 1918.

- The next major German attack was on the 27th of May in the thinly held but formidable terrain along the Aisne River known as the Chemin des Dames. The original objective of this new offensive was to draw southward the Allied reserves accumulated back of the British sector, in preparation for a final German attempt to destroy the British Army in Flanders. The French and British defenders were taken completely by surprise, and their positions were overrun rapidly on a forty-mile front. German progress on the first day was so rapid (advances up to 13 miles (21 km) were made at some points) that Ludendorff altered his plans and decided to make the diversionary attack a main effort. Most of the Aisne bridges were captured intact. The thrust toward Rheims failed but Soissons was taken, and by 31 May the Germans had reached the outskirts of Château-Thierry on the Marne, less than 40 miles (64 km) East from Paris.
- In the next few days the Germans sought to exploit and expand the deep and exposed offensive line which they had established. But by 4 June they had reached formidable resistance from some 27,500 American troops of the American Expeditionary Forces which had taken part in the check of the German advance. The 3rd Division foiled enemy attempts in the across 1 and 4 June to secure a firm bridgehead across the Marne at Château-Thierry. West of the town the 2nd Division, which included a Marine brigade, defended the road to Paris, and on 6 June they had successfully launched a counterattack in the Battle of Belleau Wood.

== Montdidier-Noyon, 9–13 June 1918 ==
Ludendorff followed up his stalled Aisne offensive with a small-scale drive in the Montdidier-Noyon sector on 9 June 1918. Twenty-one German divisions attacked the French on a twenty-three mile front extending from Montdidier to the Oise River. The French anticipated the assault and contained it after a nine-mile (14 km) penetration by the Germans, counterattacking strongly. The fighting was over by 12 June, and the enemy had little to show for the heavy losses incurred. No large American units were in the immediate vicinity of this action, although the 1st Division at Cantigny was subjected to artillery fire and diversionary raids.

== Champagne-Marne, 15–18 July 1918 ==
In the four great offensives from 21 March to 13 June 1918 the Germans gained considerable ground, but failed to achieve a decisive advantage at any point on the front. Furthermore, success was bought at a price in manpower and material which they could ill afford. Their more than 600,000 casualties were irreplaceable, whereas the Allied loss of some 800,000 men was soon more than compensated for by new American units arriving at the front in ever-mounting numbers. By July 1918 Allied troops outnumbered German troops on the Western Front. Other factors also contributed to the decline of German morale, notably the pinch of the blockade and the effectiveness of the Allied propaganda, which was distributed widely by air at the front and in German cities behind the lines. But Ludendorff refused to consider peace negotiations, and planned two more offensives for July which he hoped would bring victory. The first of the new drives was designed to capture Rheims, to make more secure the supply of the Merge salient, and to draw in Allied reserves. The second and larger offensive, destined never to be launched, would strike once again at the British in Flanders.

When the two-pronged German assault on either side of Rheims began on 15 July the Allies were prepared for it. Plans for the attack had leaked out of Berlin, and Allied airplanes had detected the unusual activity behind the enemy front. Foch had time to draw up reserves, and Petain, the French commander, skillfully deployed his troops in defense-in-depth tactics. Consequently, the German drive east of Rheims fell far short of its objective. The attack west of the city succeeded in pushing across the Marne near Château-Thierry, but was checked there by French and American units. Among the A.E.F. units involved in this action were the 3rd Infantry Division, 26th and 28th Divisions, the 42nd Infantry Division, the 369th Infantry Regiment, and supporting elements (in all about 85,000 Americans). It was here that the 38th Infantry and the 30th Infantry Regiments of the 3rd Division gained the motto, "Rock of the Marne."

By 17 July the Champagne-Marne offensive had petered out and the initiative passed to the Allies. The German people had built up great hopes for the success of this Friedensturm (peace offensive); its failure was a tremendous psychological blow to the whole nation.

== Aisne-Marne, 18 July – 6 August 1918 ==
- Several days before the Germans launched their abortive Champagne-Marne drive, the French high command had made plans for a general converging offensive against the Marne salient. Petain issued orders on 12 July for the attack to begin on the 18th, with five French armies – the Tenth, Sixth, Ninth, Fifth, and Fourth, placed around the salient from left to right – taking part. Spearheading the attack were the five divisions of the French XX Corps (Tenth Army), including the American 1st and 2nd Divisions. Early on 18 July the two American divisions and a French Moroccan division, jumping off behind a heavy barrage, launched the main blow at the northwest base of the salient near Soissons. Enemy frontline troops, taken by surprise, initially gave ground, although resistance stiffened after an Allied penetration of some three miles (5 km). Before the 1st and 2d Divisions were relieved (on 19 and 22 July respectively) they had advanced 6 to 7 miles (11 km), made Soissons untenable for the enemy, and captured 6,500 prisoners at a cost of over 10,000 American casualties.
- Meanwhile, the other French armies in the offensive also made important gains, and the German commander ordered a general retreat from the Marne salient. The French Sixth Army, on the right of the Tenth, advanced steadily from the southwest, reaching the Vesle River on 3 August. By 28 July this army included the American 3d, 4th, 28th, and 42d Divisions. The 4th and 42d Divisions were under control of the I Corps, the first American corps headquarters to participate in combat. On 4 August the American III Corps headquarters entered combat, taking control of the 28th and 32d Divisions (the latter had relieved the 3d Division in the line on 29 July). By 5 August the entire Sixth Army front was held by the two American corps. East of the Sixth Army the French Ninth and Fifth Armies also advanced into the salient. The Germans retired across the Aisne and Vesle Rivers, resolutely defending each strong point as they went.
- By 6 August the Aisne-Marne Offensive was over. The threat to Paris was ended by wiping out the Marne salient. The initiative now had definitely passed to the Allies, ending any possibility that Ludendorff could carry out his planned offensive in Flanders. Moreover, the success of the offensive revealed the advantages of Allied unity of command and the fighting qualities of American units. The eight A.E.F. divisions (1st, 2d, 3d, 4th, 26th, 28th, 32d, 42d) in the action had spearheaded much of the advance, demonstrating offensive capabilities that helped to inspire new confidence in the war-weary Allied armies. About 270,000 Americans took part in the battle.
- On 24 July, while the Aisne-Marne drive was under way, Foch had outlined his plans for the remainder of 1918 at the only conference of Allied commanders that he called during the war. He proposed that the immediate objective of the Allied offensive should be the reduction of the three main German salients (Marne, Amiens, St. Mihiel), with the goal of improving lateral communications behind the front in preparation for a general offensive in the fall. Reduction of the St. Mihiel salient was assigned to Pershing at his own request.
- The contribution made by American troops in the Aisne-Marne Offensive gave Pershing an opportunity to press again for the formation of an independent American army. Preliminary steps in the organization of the American First Army had been taken in early July 1918. On the 4th LTC Hugh A. Drum was selected as chief of staff and directed to begin establishment of army headquarters. After conferences on 10 and 21 July, Foch agreed on the 22d to the formal organization of the First Army, and to the formation of two American sectors – a temporary combat sector in the Château-Thierry region, where the already active I and III Corps could comprise the nucleus of the First Army, and a quiet sector farther east, extending from Nomeny (east of the Moselle) to a point north of St. Mihiel – which would become the actual theater of operations for the American Army as soon as circumstances permitted concentration of A.E.F. divisions there. Orders issued on 24 July announced formal organization of the First Army, effective on 10 August; designated Pershing as its commander; and located its headquarters at La Ferté-sous-Jouarre, west of Château-Thierry. Thus, 15 months after its declaration of war, the US finally had committed its formations on the ground.
- Stabilization of the Vesle River front in early August led Pershing to alter his plan for forming the First Army. Instead of organizing it in the Château-Thierry region and then moving it eastward for the St. Mihiel Offensive, he secured Foch's consent on 9 August to a build-up of First Army units in the vicinity of the St. Mihiel salient. Tentative plans for reduction of the salient called for the concentration of three American corps (about 14 American and 3 French divisions) on a front extending from Port-sur-Seille westward around the bulge to Watronville. Three American divisions would remain on the Vesle front.
- Meanwhile, Allied forces, including some American units operating in other sectors of the Western Front, were making significant gains in the preliminary phases of the great final offensives. For the sake of clarity, the role of American units in the Somme Offensive (8 August – 11 November), Oise-Aisne (18 August – 11 November), and Ypres-Lys (19 August – 11 November) Campaigns will be described briefly, before considering in more detail the activities of the main body of A.E.F. troops in the St. Mihiel (12–16 September) and Meuse-Argonne (26 September – 11 November) Campaigns.

== Somme Offensive, 8 August – 11 November 1918 ==
- On 8 August the British began limited operations with the objective of flattening the Amiens salient. This attack marked the beginning of the great Hundred Days Offensive and the Second Battle of the Somme, which continued until hostilities ceased on 11 November. The British Fourth Army, including the American 33d and 80th Divisions, struck the northwestern edge of the salient in coordination with a thrust by the French First Army from the southwest. No artillery barrage preceded the attack to forewarn the enemy. Some 600 tanks spearheaded the British assault, which jumped off during the thick fog. The completely surprised Germans quickly gave up 16,000 prisoners as their positions were overrun. Ludendorff himself characterized 8 August as the "Black Day of the German Army." The Germans were forced to fall back to the old 1915 line, where they reorganized strong defenses-in-depth. Haig then shifted his attack farther north to the vicinity of Arras on 21 August, forcing the Germans to withdraw toward the Hindenburg Line. By the end of the month they had evacuated the whole of the Amiens salient.
- The drive to breach the main Hindenburg Line began at the end of September. The American II Corps (27th and 30th Divisions), forming part of the British Fourth Army, attacked the German defenses along the line of the Cambrai-St. Quentin Canal, capturing heavily fortified Bony and Bellicourt on the 29th. By 5 October the offensive had broken through the Hindenburg Line, and the Allied forces advanced through open country to the Oise-Somme Canal (19 October). During this phase of the operations the 27th and 30th Divisions alternated in the line. When the American II Corps was relieved on 21 October, it had served 26 days in the line and suffered 11,500 casualties.
- The British advance in the Somme region continued until the Armistice, constituting the northern arm of Foch's great pincers movement on the Germans' vital lateral rail communications system. The key junction at Aulnoye, southwest of Maubeuge, was reached on 5 November. A total of 19 British Empire divisions, 12 French divisions and 1 American division took part.

== Oise-Aisne, 18 August – 11 November 1918 ==
- In mid-August the French, with the Buffalo Soldiers of the 92nd and 93rd Divisions, then under French command, started a series of drives on their front, which extended about 90 miles (140 km) from Reims westward through Soissons to Ribecourt on the Oise River. These operations continued into late September, when they merged into Foch's great final offensive of October–November. Five French armies (from right to left the Fifth, Sixth, Tenth, Third, and First) advanced abreast, in coordination with the British on the Somme to the north and the Americans to the east.
- The American 32nd Division was a part of the French Tenth Army, which spearheaded the penetration of the enemy's main line on 22 August. The 32d was instrumental in the capture of Juvigny on 30 August, which secured tactically important high ground for the Allies. The German front was so badly breached that the enemy was compelled to abandon the Vesle River line. On 9 September the 32d Division was ordered east to join the American First Army.
- The American III Corps (28th and 77th Divisions) was a part of the French Sixth Army east of Soissons, which held in late August the western part of the Vesle River sector extending from Braine to Courlandon. As the Germans retired from the Vesle northward to the Aisne valley in early September, the III Corps took part in the aggressive pursuit operations. Its two divisions carried out successful local attacks, but failed to break into the German line before they were relieved to join the American First Army – the 28th on 7–8 September and the 77th on 14–16 September.
- No American divisions, except the Buffalo Soldiers of the 92nd and the 93rd under French command, participated in the subsequent Oise-Aisne operations, which by 11 November had carried the French armies to the Belgian border. A total of about 85,000 Americans took part in the Oise-Aisne Campaign.

== Ypres-Lys, 19 August – 11 November 1918 ==
That part of the Western Front extending from the English Channel south through Ypres, and thence across the Lys River to the vicinity of Arras, was manned by an army group under King Albert of Belgium composed of Belgian, British, and French armies. In late August and early September the British Second and Fifth Armies, assisted by the American II Corps (27th and 30th Divisions), wiped out the Lys salient. When the Germans began retiring in the sector south of the Lys in October to shorten their lines, King Albert's army group attacked along its entire front. By 20 October Ostend and Bruges had been captured and the Allied left was at the Dutch frontier. In mid-October Pershing dispatched two American divisions – the 37th and 91st – to the French Army of Belgium, at Foch's request, to give impetus to the drive to cross the Scheldt (Escaut) southwest of Ghent. A general attack began in this area on 31 October and continued intermittently until hostilities ended on 11 November. The 37th Division forced a crossing of the river southeast of Heurne on 2 November and another farther north at the site of the destroyed Hermelgem-Syngem bridge on 10 November. Casualties of the two divisions in these operations totaled about 2,600. From 19 August to 11 November about 108,000 Americans participated in the Ypres-Lys Campaign.

== St. Mihiel, 12–16 September 1918 ==
- By September 1918, with both the Marne and the Amiens salients eliminated, there remained but one major threat to lateral rail communications behind the Allied lines – the old St. Mihiel salient near the Paris–Nancy line. Active preparations for its reduction began with the transfer of Headquarters First Army, effective 13 August, from La Ferté-sous-Jouarre in the Marne region to Neufchâteau on the Meuse, immediately south of St. Mihiel. On 28 August the first echelon of headquarters moved closer to the front at Ligny-en-Barrois.
- American units from Flanders to Switzerland were shifted into the area near the salient. The fourteen American and four French divisions assigned to the First Army for the operation contained ample infantry and machine gun units for the attack. But because of the earlier priority given to shipment of infantry (at the insistence of the British and French) the First Army was short of artillery, tank, air and other support units essential to a well-balanced field army. The French made up this deficiency by loaning Pershing over half the artillery and nearly half the airplanes and tanks needed for the St. Mihiel operation.
- Shortly before the offensive was to begin, Foch threatened once again to disrupt Pershing's long-held desire to carry out a major operation with an independent American force. On 30 August the Allied Commander in Chief proposed to exploit the recently gained successes on the Aisne-Marne and Amiens fronts by reducing the size of the St. Mihiel attack and dividing the American forces into three groups – one for the salient offensive and two for fronts to the east and west of the Argonne Forest. Pershing, however, remained adamant in his insistence that the First Army should not now be broken up, no matter where it might be sent into action. Finally a compromise was reached. The St. Mihiel attack was subordinated to the much larger offensive to be launched on the Meuse-Argonne front in late September, but the First Army remained intact. Pershing agreed to limit his operations by employing only the minimum force needed to reduce the salient in three or four days. Simultaneously he was to prepare his troops for a major role in the Meuse-Argonne drive.
- The St. Mihiel offensive began on 12 September with a threefold assault on the salient. The main attack was made against the south face by two American corps. On the right was the I Corps (from right to left the 82d, 90th, 5th, and 2d Divisions in line with the 78th in reserve) covering a front from Pont-à-Mousson on the Moselle westward to Limey; on the left, the IV Corps (from right to left the 89th, 42d, and 1st Divisions in line with the 3d in reserve) extending along a front from Limey westward to Marvoisin. A secondary thrust was carried out against the west face along the heights of the Meuse, from Mouilly north to Haudimont, by the V Corps (from right to left the 26th Division, the French 15th Colonial Division, and the 8th Brigade, 4th Division in line with the rest of the 4th in reserve). A holding attack against the apex, to keep the enemy in the salient, was made by the French II Colonial Corps (from right to left the French 39th Colonial Division, the French 26th Division, and the French 2d Cavalry Division in line). In First Army reserve were the American 35th, 80th, and 91st Divisions.
- Total Allied forces involved in the offensive numbered more than 650,000 – some 550,000 American and 100,000 Allied (mostly French) troops. In support of the attack the First Army had over 3,000 guns, 400 French tanks, and 1,500 airplanes. COL William Mitchell directed the heterogeneous air force, composed of British, French, Italian, Portuguese, and American units, in what proved to be the largest single air operation of the war. American squadrons flew 609 of the airplanes, which were mostly of French or British manufacture.
- Defending the salient was German "Army Detachment C", consisting of eight divisions and a brigade in the line and about two divisions in reserve. The Germans, now desperately short of manpower, had begun a step-by-step withdrawal from the salient only the day before the offensive began. The attack went so well on 12 September that Pershing ordered a speedup in the offensive. By the morning of 13 September 1 Division, advancing from the east, joined hands with the 26th Division, moving in from the west, and before evening all objectives in the salient had been captured. At this point Pershing halted further advances so that American units could be withdrawn for the coming offensive in the Meuse-Argonne sector.
- This first major operation by an American Army under its own command took 16,000 prisoners at a cost of 7,000 casualties, eliminated the threat of an attack on the rear of Allied fortifications at Nancy and Verdun, greatly improved Allied lateral rail communications, and opened the way for a possible future offensive to seize Metz and the Briey iron fields.

== Meuse-Argonne, 26 September – 11 November 1918 ==
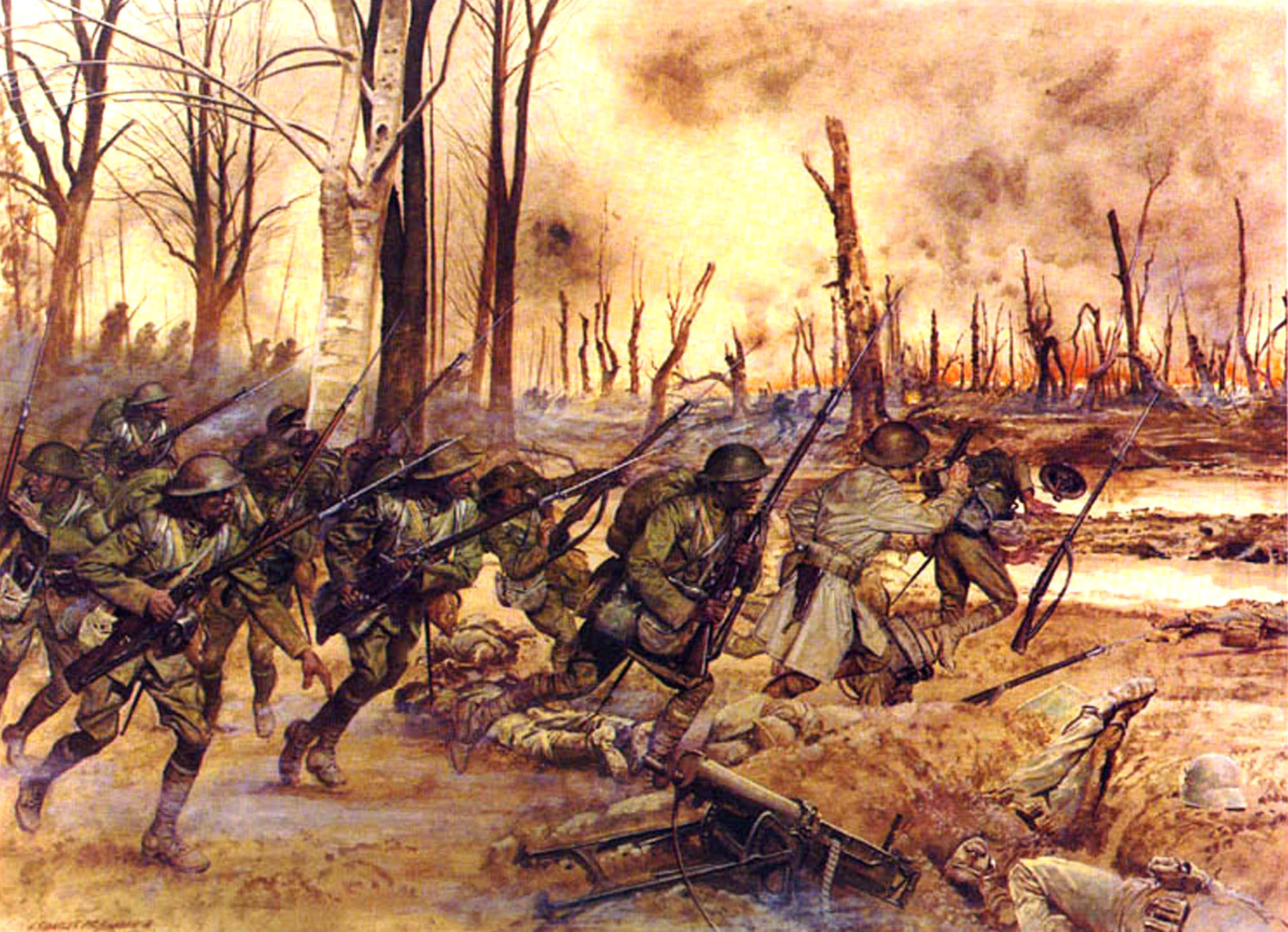
Men of the 369th Infantry Regiment in action at Séchault on 29 September 1918 during the Meuse-Argonne Offensive.

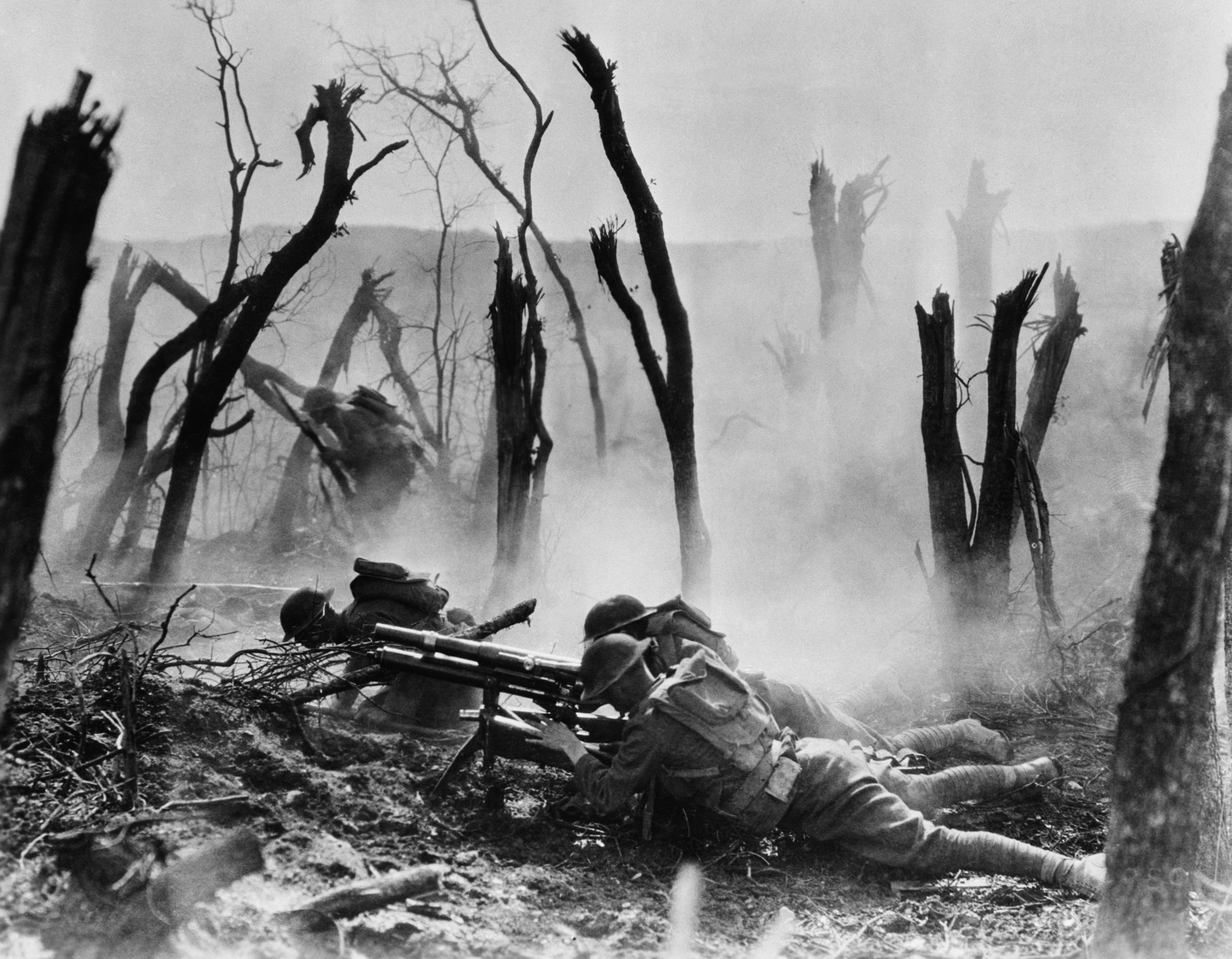
U.S. soldiers of 2nd Division engaged in combat in the Argonne Forest.

- At the end of August Marshal Foch had submitted plans to the national commanders for a final offensive along the entire Western Front, with the objective of driving the enemy out of France before winter and ending the war in the spring of 1919. The basis for his optimism was the success of Allied attacks all along the front in August. Furthermore, he pointed out, the Allies already had active operations in progress between the Moselle and Meuse, the Oise and Aisne, and on the Somme and Lys Rivers. Foch acknowledged that the Germans could stave off immediate defeat by an orderly evacuation combined with destruction of materiel and communications. Therefore, the overall aim of the fall offensive would be to prevent a step-by-step enemy retirement. As Foch anticipated, the Germans eventually contributed to the success of his strategy. Their High Command could not bring itself to sacrifice the huge stores collected behind the front lines, and so delayed the withdrawal of its armies.
- Foch's great offensive, planned to begin in the last week of September, called for a gigantic pincers movement with the objective of capturing Aulnoye and Mézières, the two key junctions in the lateral rail system behind the German front. Loss of either of these junctions would hamper seriously the German withdrawal. Despite grumbling from the English that they lacked the necessary manpower, a chiefly British army was assigned the task of driving toward Aulnoye. The A.E.F. was designated for the southern arm of the pincers, the thrust on Mézières. Simultaneously the Belgian-French-British army group in Flanders would drive toward Ghent, and the French armies in the Oise-Aisne region would exert pressure all along their front to lend support to the pincers attack.
- Pershing decided to strike his heaviest blow in a zone about 20 miles (32 km) wide between the Heights of the Meuse on the east and the western edge of the high, rough, and densely wooded Argonne Forest. This is difficult terrain, broken by a central north–south ridge that dominates the valleys of the Meuse and Aire rivers. Three heavily fortified places – Montfaucon, Cunel, and Barricourt – as well as numerous strong points barred the way to penetration of the elaborate German defenses in depth that extended behind the entire front. This fortified system consisted of three main defense lines backed up by a fourth line less well-constructed. Pershing hoped to launch an attack with enough momentum to drive through these lines into the open area beyond, where his troops could then strike at the exposed German flanks and, in a coordinated drive with the French Fourth Army coming up on the left, could cut the Sedan-Mézières railroad.
- The task of assembling troops in the concentration area between Verdun and the Forest of Argonne was complicated by the fact that many American units were currently engaged in the battle of Saint-Mihiel. Some 600,000 Americans had to be moved into the Argonne sector while 220,000 French moved out. Responsibility for solving this tricky logistical problem fell to Col. George C. Marshall, Assistant Chief of Staff, G-3 (Operations), First Army. In the ten-day period after St. Mihiel the necessary troop movements were accomplished, but many untried divisions had to be placed in the vanguard of the attacking forces.
- On the 20-mile (32 km) Meuse-Argonne front where the main American attack w to be made, Pershing disposed three corps side by side, each with three divisions in line and one in corps reserve. In the center was the V Corps (from right to left the 79th, 37th, and 91st Divisions with the 32d in reserve), which would strike the decisive blow. On the right was the III Corps (from right to left the 33d, 80th, and 4th Divisions with the 3d in reserve), which would move up the west aide of the Meuse. On the left was the I Corps (from right to left the 35th, 28th, and 77th Divisions with the 92d in reserve), which would advance parallel to the French Fourth Army on its left. Eastward across the Meuse the American front extended in direct line some 60 miles (97 km); this sector was held by two French Corps (IV and II Colonial) and the American IV Corps in the Saint-Mihiel sector. Pershing had available to support his offensive nearly 4000 guns, two-thirds manned by American artillerymen; 190 light French tanks, mostly with American personnel; and some 820 aircraft, 600 of them flown by Americans.
- The Meuse-Argonne Offensive falls into three phases. During the initial phase (26 September – 3 October), the First Army advanced through most of the southern Meuse-Argonne region, captured enemy strong points, seized the first two German defense lines, and then stalled before the third line. Failure of tank support, a difficult supply situation, and the inexperience of American troops all contributed to checking its advance.

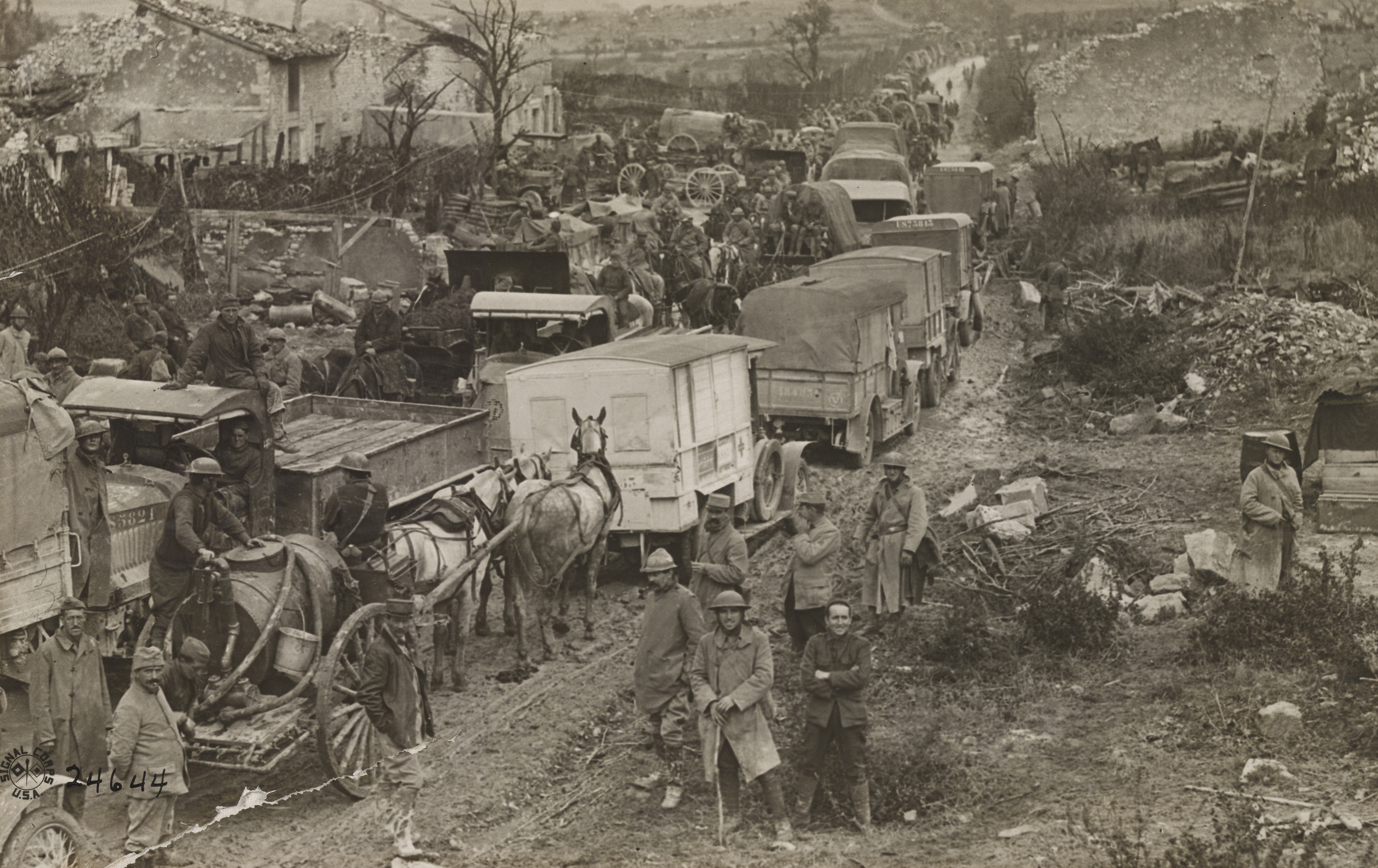
The congestion of traffic on roads back of the American lines in the Argonne is, at certain places, so great that the streams of vehicles are not able to move faster than two miles an hour. This scene, in the ruins of Esnes, is typical.

- In the second phase (4–31 October), the First Army, after the inexperienced divisions had been replaced by veteran units, slowly ground its way through the third German line. The enemy was forced to throw in reserves, drawn from other parts of the front, thus aiding the Allied advances elsewhere. In the face of a stubborn defense, American gains were limited and casualties were severe, especially as a result of the newly devised enemy tactic of attacking frontline troops with airplanes. First Army air units retaliated with bombing raids which broke up German preparations for counterattacks. By the end of October the enemy had been cleared from the Argonne and First Army troops were through the German main positions. Two notable incidents of this phase of the campaign were the fight of the "Lost Battalion" of the 77th Division (2–7 October), and the feat of CPL (later SGT) Alvin C. York, who single-handedly killed 15 Germans and captured 132 on 8 October.
- In mid-October, the organization of the Second Army was completed, at Toul in the St. Mihiel sector, to provide means for better control of the lengthening American front and solutions of the diverse tactical problems that it presented. Pershing assumed command of the new army group thus formed.
- Before the third and final phase (1–11 November) of the offensive got under way, many of the exhausted divisions of the First Army were replaced, roads were built or repaired, supply was improved, and most Allied units serving with the A.E.F. were withdrawn. On 1 November First Army units began the assault of the now strengthened German fourth line of defense. Penetration was rapid and spectacular. The V Corps in the center advanced about six miles (10 km) the first day, compelling the German units west of the Meuse to withdraw hurriedly. On 4 November the III Corps forced a crossing of the Meuse and advanced northeast toward Montmédy. Elements of the V Corps occupied the heights opposite Sedan on 7 November, thus finally accomplishing the First Army's chief mission – denial of the Sedan-Mézières railroad to the Germans. Marshal Foch, at this juncture, shifted the First Army left boundary eastward so that the French Fourth Army might capture Sedan, which had fallen to the Prussians in 1870. American units were closing up along the Meuse and, east of the river, were advancing toward Montmédy, Briey, and Metz, when hostilities ended on 11 November.
- General Pershing authorized the results of the Meuse-Argonne Campaign, the greatest battle in American history up to that time, in his Final Report: "Between 26 September and 11 November, 22 American and 4 French divisions, on the front extending from southeast of Verdun to the Argonne Forest, had engaged and decisively beaten 47 different German divisions, representing 25 percent of the enemy's entire divisional strength on the western front."
- "The First Army suffered a loss of about 117,000 combatants (combined killed and wounded). It captured 26,000 prisoners, 847 cannons, 3,000 machineguns, and large quantities of material." More than 1,200,000 Americans had taken part in the 47-day campaign.

== Vittorio Veneto, 24 October – 4 November 1918 ==
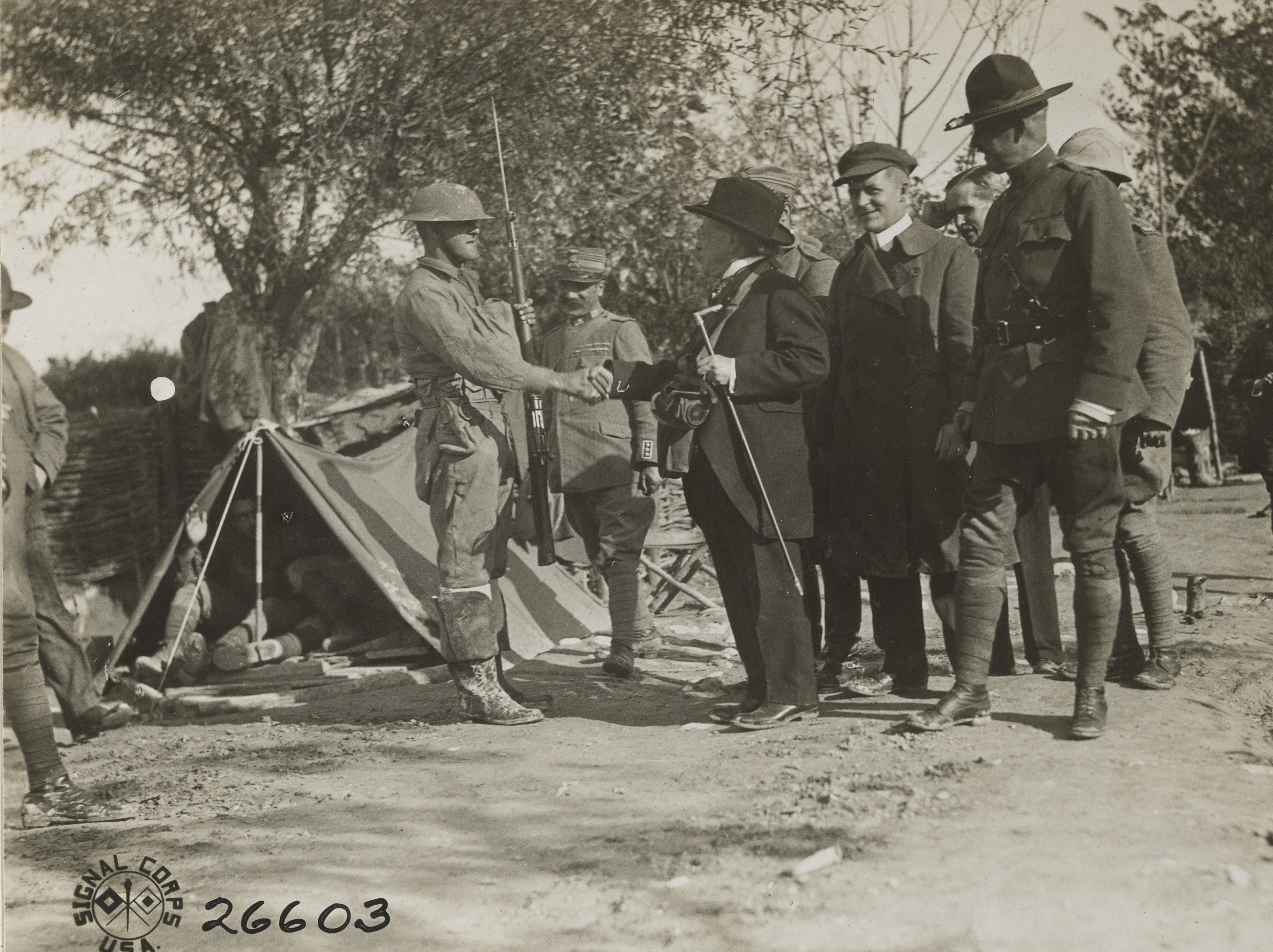
Mr. Samuel Gompers, American labor leader, shaking hands with doughboys in the trenches in the sector held by the Americans on the Piave front, near Maserada sul Piave, Italy, October 1918.

Late in the war, Americans participated on a limited scale in campaigns in Italy. The 332d Regiment with attached hospital troops was sent from the A.E.F. to the Italian Front in July 1918 for the morale effect that the sight of Americans would have on the Italians. This force of about 1,200 men took part in the last great Italian offensive against the Austrians, the Battle of Vittorio Veneto.

== See also ==
- Allied intervention in the Russian Civil War
- American Expeditionary Force, North Russia
- American Expeditionary Force, Siberia
- General Pershing WWI casualty list
- North Russia intervention
