= Remington D. B. Vernam =

American pilot

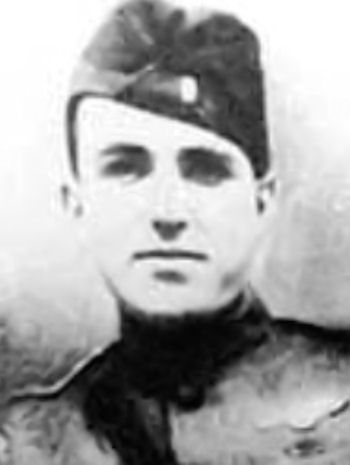
- Remington D. B. Vernam, 1918
- Born: March 24, 1896; Rutherford, New Jersey
- Died: December 1, 1918 (aged 22); Longwy, France
- Burial place: St. Mihiel American Cemetery
- Military career
- Allegiance: United States
- Branch: Aéronautique Militaire (France); Air Service, United States Army
- Rank: 1Lt
- Units: Aéronautique Militaire: Escadrille SPA.96; Air Service, United States Army: 22nd Aero Squadron
- Conflicts: World War I
- Awards: Distinguished Service Cross (United States)

Lieutenant Remington D. B. Vernam (March 24, 1896 - December 1, 1918) was an American pilot who had enlisted in the French air service during World War I, and was transferred to the United States Army Air Service after American entry into the war.

He attained ace status when he shot down three enemy observation balloons and three enemy planes. He shared his first victory, a balloon on 12 August 1918, with Charles Lefevre while with Escadrille 96. His remaining five victories were scored between 10 and 30 October 1918 while flying with the 22nd Aero Squadron. Vernam was shot down behind German lines on October 30, 1918, aged 22, later dying from his wounds. He is buried in the St. Mihiel American Cemetery in France.

== Citation ==
The Distinguished Service Cross is presented to Remington D. B. Vernam, First Lieutenant (Air Service), U.S. Army, for extraordinary heroism in action near Buzancy, France, October 10, 1918. Successively attacking two enemy balloons, which were moored to their nests, Lieutenant Vernam displayed the highest degree of daring. He executed his task despite the fact that several enemy planes were above him, descending to an altitude of less than ten meters when five miles within the enemy lines. His well-directed fire caused both balloons to burst into flames."

== See also ==
- List of World War I flying aces from the United States

== Bibliography ==
- American Aces of World War 1 Harry Dempsey. Osprey Publishing, 2001. ISBN 1-84176-375-6, ISBN 978-1-84176-375-0.
