= Arthur Raymond Brooks =

American World War I flying ace

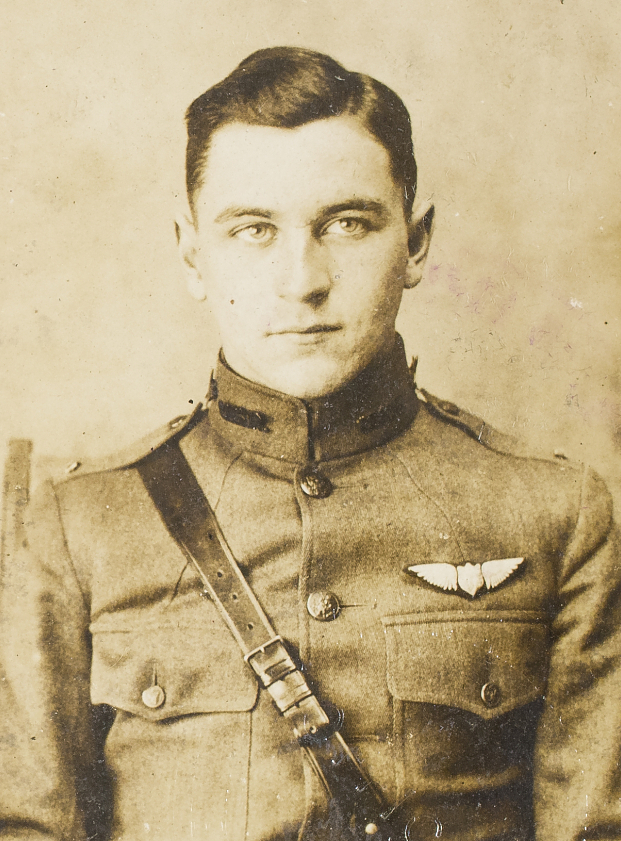
- Lt. Ray Brooks
- Born: November 1, 1895; Framingham, Massachusetts
- Died: July 17, 1991 (aged 95); Summit, New Jersey
- Military career
- Allegiance: United States
- Branch: Air Service, United States Army
- Service years: 1917-1922
- Rank: Captain
- Nickname: Ray
- Unit: Air Service, United States Army: 22d Aero Squadron
- Conflicts: World War I
- Awards: Distinguished Service Cross

Arthur Raymond Brooks (1 November 1895 – 17 July 1991) was an American World War I flying ace of the United States Army Air Service credited with shooting down multiple enemy aircraft. Among his most prominent achievements was when he single-handedly took on a squadron of German Fokker airplanes, officially downing 2 of them in one aerial battle piloting his SPAD XIII named Smith IV. He was a pioneer in the development of radio navigational aids (NAVAIDs) used by pilots for location and navigation as well as air-to-ground communications. Brooks also participated in early endeavors to commercialize aviation as a passenger-carrying business and was one of the earliest commercial pilots involved with carrying mail (air mail) for the US Post Office Department.

== Early life and World War I ==
Brooks was born in Framingham, Massachusetts. He graduated as valedictorian from Framingham Academy and High School in Massachusetts in 1913 and from Massachusetts Institute of Technology in 1917. He enlisted in the U.S. Army Signal Officer Reserve Corps and attended the School of Military Aeronautics with the Royal Flying Corps in Canada from September to November 1917. Brooks then trained with the Texas 139th Aero Squadron from November 1917 to February 1918. In March 1918, Brooks was transferred to France with the 139th Aero Squadron, where he flew the SPAD S.VII and shot down his first enemy aircraft on 29 July 1918. Afterwards he was transferred to the newly formed 22nd Aero Squadron to help lead the unit's new pilots into combat. After his third victory he became a flight commander of the 22nd Aero Squadron flying the SPAD XIII C.1. His combat actions earned him a recommendation for the Medal of Honor. The U.S. Army, upon review of the action awarded him the Distinguished Service Cross.

Brooks' final SPAD, Smith IV, resides in the aircraft collection of the National Air and Space Museum

On September 14, 1918, Brooks and five other SPAD S.XIIIs spotted three squadrons of Fokker D.VIIs, generally regarded as the best fighter of World War I. While moving in to attack, Brooks looked behind him and saw a fourth squadron of 12 Fokkers coming from behind the SPADs. Brooks turned into the Germans as they opened fire, separating him from his squadron. Four Fokkers continued their pursuit of the other SPADs while eight Fokkers stayed to take down Brooks in a furious aerial mêlée. Brooks used every known evasive maneuver to keep the Germans from getting a shot on him, skidding, looping and diving. One Fokker dived on him to make a pass, firing as he went down. Brooks climbed to face him. Before they could collide, the German pilot divided away. As he leveled out, Brooks faced another Fokker attacking him head on for a pass. Another Fokker also dived him. Brooks skidded by his fire, then rolled his plane to get a firing angle on the German as he went underneath him. A short burst from Brooks' Vickers machine guns shot the Fokker down in flames. Leveling out, Brooks shot down the next Fokker that approached him. Not remaining stationary for more than a moment, Brooks engaged the remaining Fokkers, firing at each one that approached.

Brooks zoom climbed to evade an attack, but as his plane was pointed directly at the sky, his engine sputtered, his propellers stopping. The fuel in his main tank had run dry. Brooks quickly switched to the auxiliary tank in the top wing as he stalled. As he stalled and began to fall away, a Fokker made a strafing pass, shattering his windshield and hitting his right Vickers gun. The gun could then only fire once per trigger-pull. As he dove away, he shot down two more Fokkers with only one functioning machine gun.

With the four remaining Germans now able to attack him with less risk of hitting each other, Brooks decided to call it a day and used the SPAD's superior diving speed to run, bobbing and weaving to avoid the Germans' fire. During the aerial mêlée he shot down four Fokkers, though U.S. Army records only credited him with two. During this combat his wingman 1Lt. Philip Edward Hassinger was attacked and to this day is still listed as Missing In Action (MIA). Hassinger was credited with shooting down two German Fokkers before he went missing. Brooks was finally able to escape the last four pursuing enemy aircraft by using his superior diving speed.

Brooks is the subject of a 1963 book entitled Capt. Arthur Ray Brooks: America's quiet ace of W.W.I by Walter A Musciano. He is also the subject of the painting Last Victory by noted aviation artist Roy Grinnell.

Brooks returned to the United States in July 1919 and was stationed at Kelly Field, Texas, where he was promoted to captain and assigned as the commander of the 1st Pursuit Group. He was subsequently assigned to the Air Service Field Officer's School, Langley Field, Virginia.

He resigned from the army and received an Honorable Discharge in December 1922.

== After World War I ==
As a civilian, Brooks established Florida Airways Corporation, which eventually became Eastern Airlines. He was also involved in the Contract Air Mail Route No. 10, and worked for the U.S. Department of Commerce, Aeronautics Branch where he was responsible for surveying what would become the nation's first air routes. He also supervised the first installations of radiobeacons to aid airmail pilots navigating between New York and Washington, D.C.

He joined Bell Telephone Laboratories (1928), where he supervised air operations and the testing of electronic aids for air navigation and communications. He was responsible for the development of air-to-ground communications systems. He retired from Bell Labs as its Chief Pilot in 1960. He was also involved in numerous early flying clubs which were forming to encourage participation in aviation for both personal/pleasure and commercial purposes.

Brooks remained involved with aviation for the remainder of his life. Even in his nineties, he enjoyed flying all sorts of aircraft, including ultralights, gliders and hot-air balloons. He belonged to many aviation-related and professional associations and organizations including the American Legion, Military Order of the World Wars, Combat Pilots Association, Order of Daedalians, Air Force Association, OX-5 Aviation Pioneers Association, Telephone Pioneers of America, Cross and Cockade, Associate Fellow of the American Institute for Aeronautics and Astronautics, Quiet Birdmen, World War I Overseas Flyers and the American Fighter Aces Association. Brooks also remained involved with the alumni affairs of his alma mater—MIT.

He attended numerous air shows and reunions, including the sixty-fifth, and final reunion, held for the Lafayette Flying Corps at Peterson AFB, Colorado in 1983. In 1980, he was inducted into the Aviation Hall of Fame of New Jersey.

An extensive collection of his diaries, correspondence and other papers is maintained by the National Aviation and Space Museum. These papers relate to his military career with the U.S. Army Air Service (1917–22), his years in both civilian government service and the private sector (1923–60), as well as a lifetime's involvement in numerous military, academic, aeronautical and professional associations and organizations. Additionally, there are examples of correspondence and autographed photographs from such aerospace notables as Eddie Rickenbacker, Jimmy Doolittle, Billy Mitchell, Clayton Bissell, Reed Chambers and Michael Collins.

Brooks died at age 95 on July 17, 1991, at his home in Summit, New Jersey. At the time of his death, he was the last surviving American World War I ace who served in a U.S. Squadron. He is buried in a family plot in North Framingham, Massachusetts.

== Text of citations ==
=== Distinguished Service Cross ===
The Distinguished Service Cross is presented to Arthur Raymond Brooks, Second Lieutenant (Air Service), U.S. Army, for extraordinary heroism in action over Mars-la-Tour, France, September 14, 1918. When his patrol was attacked by 12 enemy Fokkers over Mars-la-Tour, 8 miles within the enemy lines, Second Lieutenant Brooks alone fought bravely and relentlessly with eight of them, pursuing the fight from 5,000 meters to within a few meters of the ground, and though his right rudder control was out and his plane riddled with bullets, he destroyed two Fokkers, one falling out of control and the other bursting into flames." DSC citation, General Orders No. 123, W.D., 1918

== See also ==
- List of World War I flying aces from the United States

== Bibliography ==
Capt. Arthur Ray Brooks: America's Quiet Ace of W.W.I Walter A. Musciano. Hobby Helper, 1963.
