= 99th Reconnaissance Squadron =

Active US Air Force unit

99th Reconnaissance Squadron

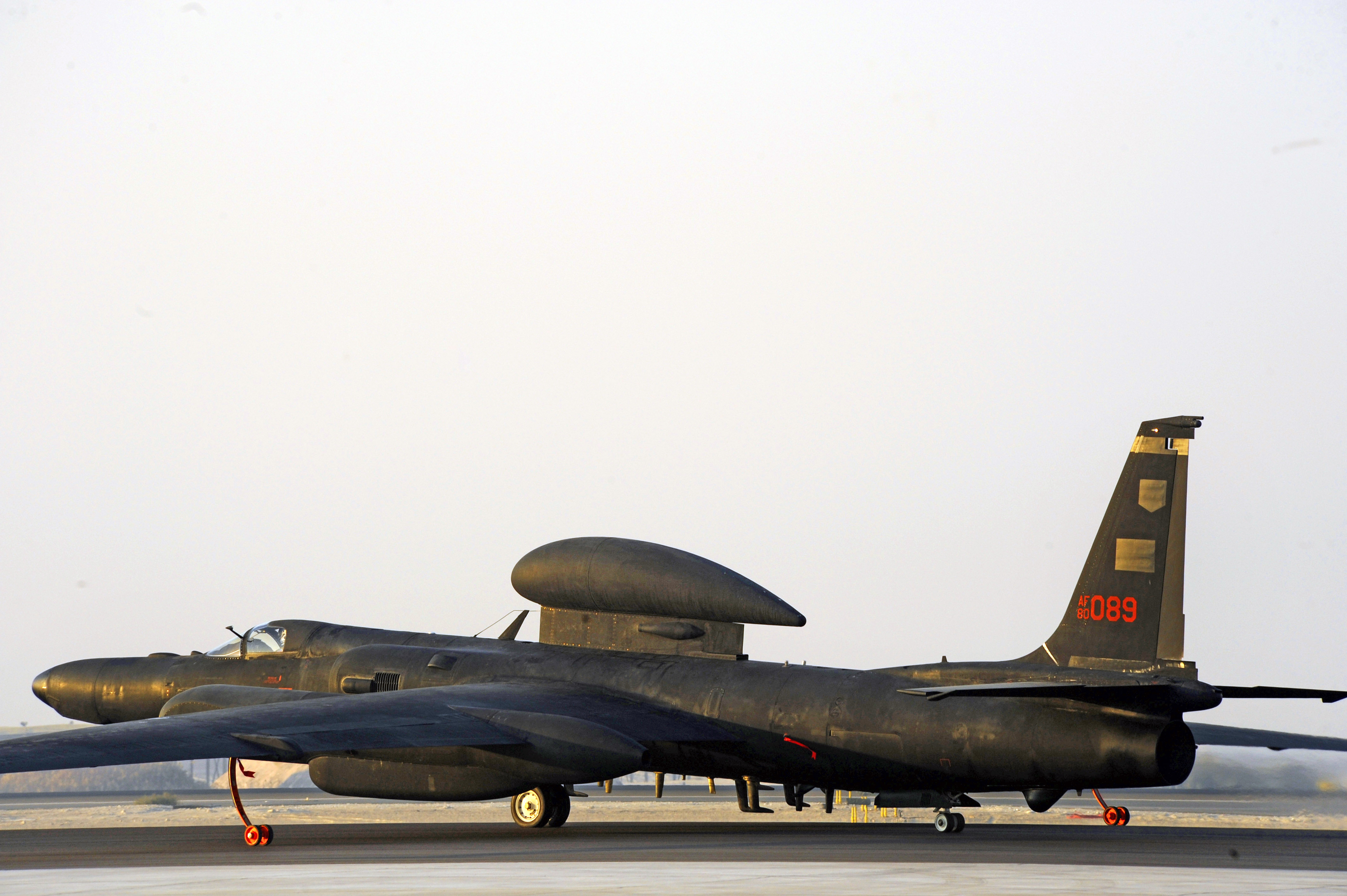
- U-2 Dragon Lady 80-1089 from the 99th Expeditionary Reconnaissance Squadron taxis to the runway for takeoff
- Active: 1917–1919; 1919–1927; 1928–1948; 1949–1971; 1972–present
- Country: United States
- Branch: United States Air Force
- Role: Reconnaissance
- Size: Squadron
- Part of: Air Combat Command
- Garrison/HQ: Beale Air Force Base, California
- Engagements: World War I; World War II - Antisubmarine; World War II - Asia-Pacific Theater; Vietnam War; 1991 Gulf War (Defense of Saudi Arabia; Liberation of Kuwait); Operation Urgent Fury Operation Just Cause; Iraq Campaign

- Decorations: Distinguished Unit Citation (2x); Presidential Unit Citation; Air Force Outstanding Unit Award with Combat "V" Device (2x); Air Force Outstanding Unit Award (16x); Republic of Vietnam Gallantry Cross with Palm

Insignia
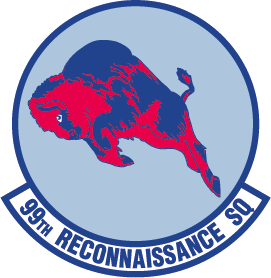
- 99th Reconnaissance Squadron Emblem (Note: Approved 4 March 1924.)
- Tail code: BB

Aircraft flown
- Reconnaissance: Lockheed U-2S Dragon Lady

The 99th Reconnaissance Squadron is a squadron of the United States Air Force. It is assigned to the 9th Operations Group, Air Combat Command, stationed at Beale Air Force Base, California. The squadron is equipped with the Lockheed U-2 Dragon Lady reconnaissance aircraft.

The 99th is one of the oldest units in the United States Air Force, first being organized as the 99th Aero Squadron on 21 August 1917 at Kelly Field, Texas. The squadron deployed to France and fought on the Western Front during World War I as a Corps observation squadron.

During World War II the unit served both in the Panama Canal Zone as an anti-submarine unit and in the Pacific Theater of Operations (PTO) as part of Twentieth Air Force as a Boeing B-29 Superfortress bomber squadron. During the Cold War was part of Strategic Air Command equipped with Boeing B-47 Stratojet medium bombers, and later with the Lockheed SR-71 Blackbird strategic reconnaissance aircraft.

Harvard Business School profiled the 99th and its innovation efforts in a 2019 case study.

== Mission ==
The 99th Reconnaissance Squadron is responsible for providing critical intelligence for use by the highest levels of the U.S. government. Squadron pilots fly the Lockheed U-2S aircraft as they continuously train to upgrade from normal aircraft commander status to that of instructor pilot status.

The current mission statement of the 99th Reconnaissance Squadron is "To deploy and employ warrior Airmen and execute effective and sustained U-2 operations globally in support of National Objectives."

== History ==
=== World War I ===
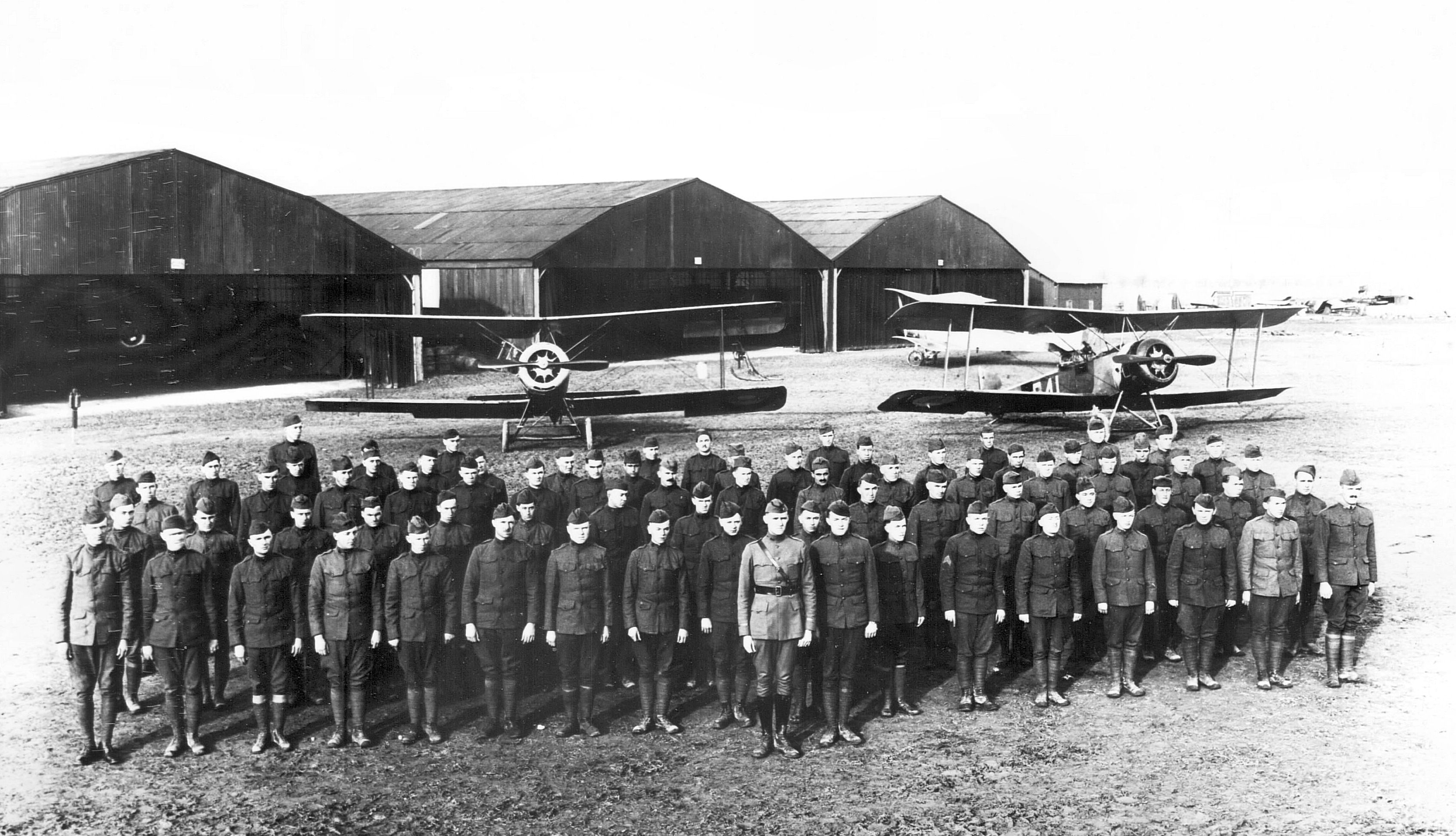
Men of the 99th Aero Squadron with their Salmson 2A2s at Parois Airdrome, France, November 1918.

Organized at Kelly Field, Texas, on 21 August 1917, the 99th Aero Squadron moved to Garden City, New York, in early November and sailed for France on the fourteenth. After training in the Sopwith 1½ Strutter and the Salmson 2, the squadron began flying combat missions in June 1918.

Assigned to the V Corps Observation Group, United States First Army Air Service, the 99th Aero Squadron (Corps Observation) was assigned to the Toul Sector of the French Western Front on 22 June. It served as a school squadron with V Army Corps Infantry Liaison School. On 19 July, was assigned to the St. Die sector during which time one flight of unit, operating in Vosges region of Alsace and Lorraine where it participated in combat with French XXXIII Corps.

Between 12 and 16 September the squadron flew reconnaissance missions and directed artillery fire in support French 8th Army and the American V Army Corps during the St. Mihiel offensive. It also participated in the Meuse-Argonne offensive between 26 September – 11 November 1918 when the Armistice with Germany was reached.

The 99th Aero Squadron remained in France until 8 May 1919, then moved to Mitchel Field, New York, where the unit was demobilized; the men who had served in France were returned to civilian life.

=== Inter-war period ===
The 99th was retained after World War I as part of the permanent United States Army Air Service, and after a series of administrative moves in which the squadron was an administrative unit, was assigned to Bolling Field, District of Columbia, where it was organized as 99th Corps Observation Squadron. It was manned largely with veterans of the AEF who remained in the Air Service and was equipped with war surplus Dayton-Wright DH-4s and some British Royal Aircraft Establishment Royal Aircraft Factory S.E.5s that had been shipped from Britain during the war as engineering models to license produce in the United States. At Bolling Field, the pilots of the squadron trained in aerial reconnaissance and also trained with Army units in Northern Virginia on battlefield observation maneuvers and artillery spotting and adjustments, similar to the combat missions the squadron flew on the Western Front during the way. However lack of funding for training and the general feeling in the United States that the peace lessened the need for a strong military led to many of the combat veterans to leave the service. As a result, the proficiency of squadron aircrews deteriorated until the 99th had no one proficient enough to participate in the 1929 bombing and gunnery matches.

In 1927, the 99th moved to Kelly Field, Texas, where it was assigned to the Air Corps Training Center. It was inactivated on 31 July. On 9 November 1928, it was reactivated at Mitchell Field, New York, and was equipped with a series of observation aircraft, and performed operational testing on the planes, and various variants over the next several years. With the creation of the GHQ Air Force on 1 March 1935, the group became the 9th Bombardment Group and the 99th became a bombardment squadron. With the new mission came new airplanes. The new bombardment squadron received American-made Martin B-10s in 1936 and Douglas B-18 Bolos in 1938. Squadron members trained hard learning the tactics and maneuvers of their new aircraft and new mission.

=== World War II ===
==== Antisubmarine warfare ====
As part of the buildup of Air Corps forces in the Panama Canal Zone prior to the United States entry into World War II, the 99th was transferred to Rio Hato Field, Panama on 13 November 1940. It was almost immediately redesignated as the 99th Bombardment Squadron (Heavy), and equipped with Douglas B-18 Bolos. Its mission was to patrol the Pacific approaches to the Panama Canal.

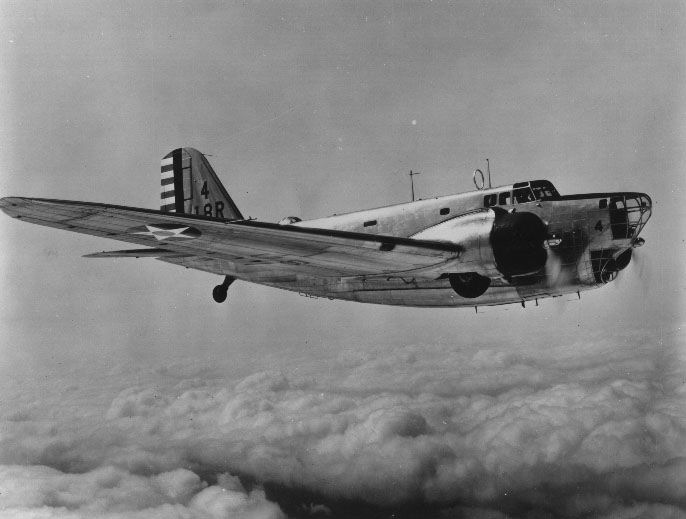
A Douglas B-18A Bolo assigned to the 99th Bombardment Squadron (Heavy) on patrol from Zandery Field, Dutch Guiana, 1942.

Tragedy struck the 99th early in its Panama assignment. On 27 February 1941, one of its B-18As, piloted by 1st Lieutenant Jack L. Schoch and with six other crew members aboard, crashed into Panama Bay just off Venado Beach, with the loss of all on board. The cause of this mysterious loss were never determined, although rescue efforts continued late into the night. With its remaining four B-18As, the unit continued its intensive training program from its base at Rio Hato until, on 25 August 1941, it received one of the new Boeing B-17B Flying Fortresses assigned to the Command.

Just before the Pearl Harbor Attack, on 3 December, the Squadron was ordered to distant Zandrey Field, Dutch Guiana (by way of Piarco Airport, Trinidad), under an agreement with the Netherlands government-in-exile, by which the United States occupied the colony to protect bauxite mines. However, to the disappointment of the crews, the squadron had to leave its B-17 behind. It was, however, reinforced with additional B-18As, bringing squadron strength up to six aircraft. At Zandry, the unit shuttled from Zandery to Atkinson Field, British Guiana and, by January 1942, had eight Curtiss P-40C Warhawks assigned. The P-40s were, in actuality detached for airfield defense by the Trinidad Base Command, under which the 99th fell at the time.

The intensive flying of the first two months of the war soon took its toll, however, and by the end of February 1942, the squadron was forced to report that it had but three B-18A's operational at Zandery and that " .... none of them are airworthy at this time." Apparently the unit was quickly reinforced and by 1 March strength was back up to six aircraft, and seven combat crews, all of whom had more than 12 months experience.

Operations From Zandry Field consisted of coastal, convoy and anti-submarine patrols until 31 October 1942. Just prior to which time the 4th Antisubmarine Squadron was attached to the Squadron between 9 and 16 October. At this point AAF Antisubmarine Command took over the mission of the 99th and the men and aircraft of the squadron were reassigned. The squadron was detached from Sixth Air Force and reassigned to Orlando Army Air Base, Florida, without personnel or equipment, where it became part of the Army Air Forces School of Applied Tactics (AAFSAT) in central and northern Florida.

At the AAFSAT, the squadron trained units at various airfields in central and northern Florida, the squadron trained cadres for 44 bomb groups in organization and operations, performed bombing pattern tests, experimented with 3-plane formations to attack moving ships, and performed over a hundred equipment tests.

==== B-29 Superfortress era ====
On 3 March 1944, the squadron was again moved without personnel or equipment to Dalhart Army Air Field, Texas, where the 99th was assigned to the 313th Bombardment Wing, with a mission to organize and train for Boeing B-29 Superfortress operations in the Western Pacific. The 99th helped to develop operational bombardment tactics and tested special devices and equipment during this time.

In 1944 the 99th moved to Dalhart Army Air Field, Texas, where it began training on the new Superfortress as part of the 313th Bombardment Wing, to organize and train for B-29 operations in the Western Pacific. The 99th helped to develop operational bombardment tactics and tested special devices and equipment during this time. It then moved to McCook Army Air Field, Nebraska, in May 1944 where it trained in earnest for its own combat deployment.

After six months in the new B-29, the 99th transferred to North Field (Tinian), in the Mariana Islands, just east of the Philippines. Arriving at Tinian on 28 December 1944, the 99th Bombardment Squadron, Very Heavy flew its first bombing raids on 27, 29 and 31 January 1945, against Japanese installations in the northern Marianas. On 25 February the 99th joined an all-out Allied effort against Tokyo's port and industrial areas.

For the remaining months of the war, squadron B-29s repeatedly struck Japanese aircraft factories, chemical plants, naval bases and airdromes. It also participated in night, low-level incendiary bombing attacks on urban areas.

During these months the 99th won two Distinguished Unit Citations. The first came for 15–16 April 1945 bombing raids on Kawasaki, Japan's industrial center, which furnished components for Tokyo and Yokohama's heavy industry. The squadron won the second award in mine-laying operations beginning in mid May 1944 in the Shimonoseki Straits, which controlled access to the Inland Seas. This operation crippled Japan's efforts to ship food, raw materials, war supplies, troops, and combat equipment to and from the homeland.

The 99th Bomb Squadron continued its attacks on Japan until flying its last mission, a low-level night incendiary attack on Kumagaya on 14 August 1945. With the end of World War II, the squadron moved to Harmon Air Force Base, Guam on 17 March 1946 and inactivated there on 20 October 1948.

=== Strategic Air Command ===
The Air Force established the 9th Strategic Reconnaissance Wing at Fairfield-Suisun Air Force Base (later Travis Air Force Base, California, on 25 April 1949 and activated it on 1 May as a Strategic Air Command (SAC) unit. 99th Strategic Reconnaissance Squadron flew Boeing RB-17 Flying Fortresses and, later, Boeing RB-29 Superfortresses, and a few Convair RB-36 Peacemakers. Their mission was to conduct visual, photographic, electronic, and weather reconnaissance operations.

Squadron reconnaissance operations were short-lived, however, as on 1 April 1950, the Air Force redesignated the wing as the 9th Bombardment Wing and the 99th as a bombardment squadron. The 99th continued to fly B-29s at Travis until 1 May 1953, when SAC moved the wing and its squadrons to Mountain Home Air Force Base, Idaho. By June 1955, the 99th Bombardment Squadron had replaced its B-29s with new Boeing B-47 Stratojets. In November 1955 the 99th and other wing squadrons demonstrated SAC's ability to strike anywhere in the world making several deployments to England and Guam.

Squadron B-47s flew nonstop from the 8,300 miles from Mountain Home to New Zealand. The 99th flew nuclear deterrent missions for ten years. In November 1965, SAC agreed to transfer Mountain Home to Tactical Air Command. The 99th's B-47s were retired and by 1 February 1966 all squadron aircraft were gone.

In January 1966 the first production Lockheed SR-71 Blackbirds had landed at Beale Air Force Base, California. This new aircraft gave SAC a reconnaissance capability that far exceeded any then available in terms of speed, altitude, and coverage. The SR-71 flew at more than three times the speed of sound (Mach 3+) at altitudes above 80,000 feet. It carried the most advanced observation equipment in the world. The 4200th Strategic Reconnaissance Wing was activated at Beale AFB on 1 January 1965 as the SR-71's parent unit. In October 1965 Fifteenth Air Force suggested the Air Force redesignate the 9th Bombardment Wing as the 9th Strategic Reconnaissance Wing to continue the wing's proud history. The Air Force agreed and on 25 June 1966 the wing became the 9th Strategic Reconnaissance Wing and the 99th a strategic reconnaissance squadron. The 9th replaced the 4200th SRW at Beale AFB.

At Beale, the 99th trained with the SR-71 to bring the aircraft and crews to mission-ready status. By March 1967 the aircraft was ready. The SR-71 quickly deployed to Kadena Air Base, Okinawa, and began flying operational missions over Southeast Asia. Squadron pilots and reconnaissance systems operator gathered photographic and electronic data for U.S. commanders in South Vietnam from 1967 until 1 April 1971 when the squadron inactivated.

In November 1972, the 99th Strategic Reconnaissance Squadron was re-activated at U-Tapao Royal Thai Navy Airfield, Thailand. The squadron was equipped a combination of U-2s, DC-130s and CH-3s flying classified missions over Southeast Asia until 30 June 1976. When the U-2 joined the SR-71 under the 9th Strategic Reconnaissance Wing at Beale AFB, the 99th Strategic Reconnaissance Squadron returned to Beale.

The U-2, although slower than the SR-71, cost much less to operate and provided more "on-station" time. As intelligence collection increased throughout the 1980s, 99th U-2 pilots manned detachments at sites around the world. With the SR-71's retirement in 1990, the U-2 assumed responsibility for all of America's manned high-altitude reconnaissance.

During Operation Desert Shield, 99th Squadron pilots immediately deployed to Saudi Arabia and flew their first missions of 19 August 1990, just 17 days after Iraq invaded Kuwait. Throughout Desert Shield/Storm, squadron pilots provided vital reconnaissance that kept coalition commanders informed on the positions and movement of Iraqi troops. This information made air attacks more effective and helped reduce casualties in the ground war.

=== Modern era ===
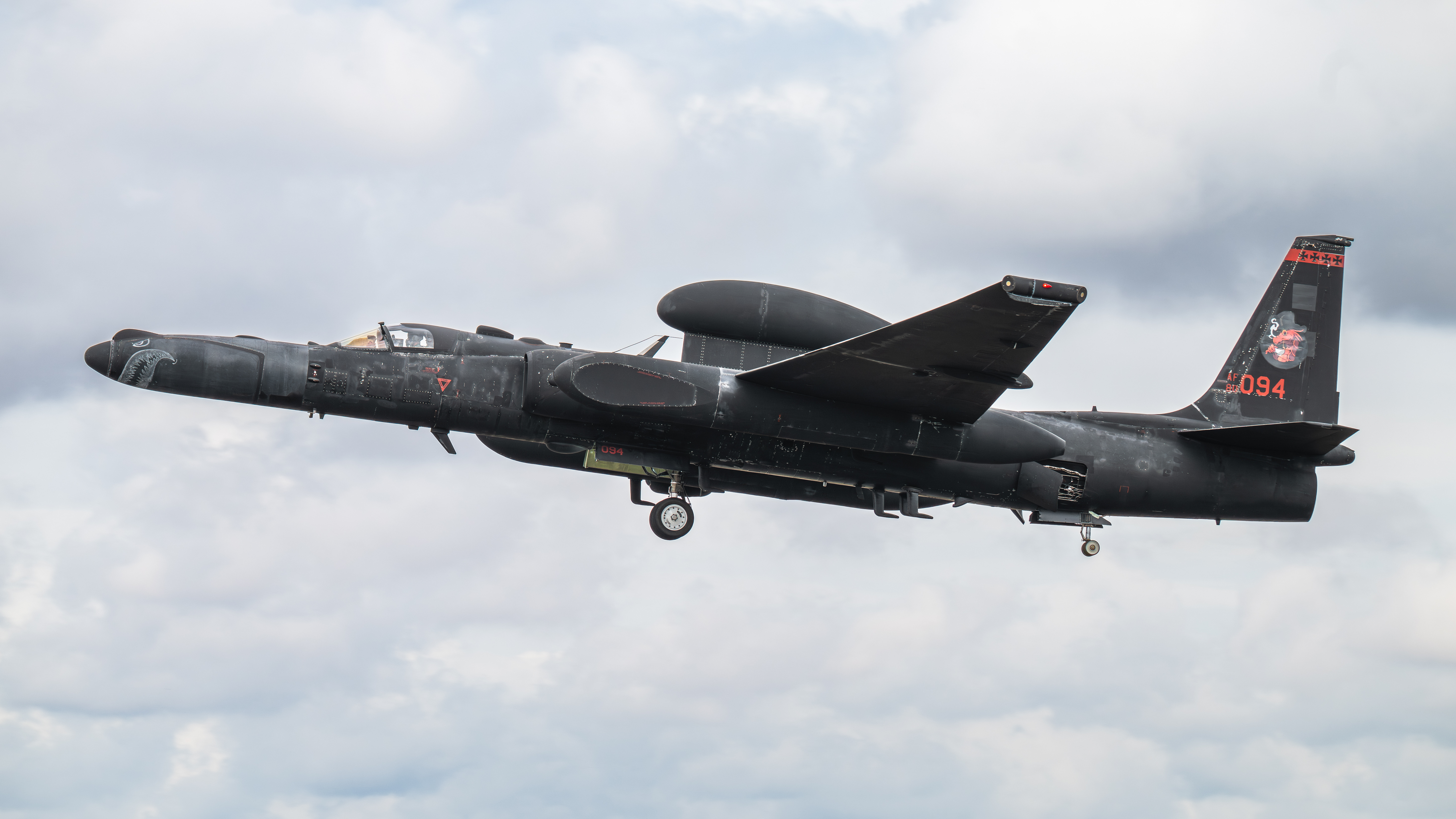
Lockheed U-2S of the 99th Reconnaissance Squadron at RAF Fairford in 2025.

Operational missions include extensive reconnaissance efforts during Operations Urgent Fury, Just Cause, Desert Shield, Desert Storm and operation Iraqi Freedom as well as humanitarian efforts covering wildfire and earthquake damage in California and Midwestern United States floods. 99th personnel are currently temporarily assigned to four overseas detachments.

The 99th Expeditionary Reconnaissance Squadron deployed to RAF Fairford, Gloucestershire, in the United Kingdom in September 2019.

== Lineage ==
- Organized as the 99th Aero Squadron on 21 August 1917

Redesignated 99th Aero Squadron (Corps Observation) on 11 March 1918
Redesignated 99th Aero Squadron on 24 May 1919
Demobilized on 9 June 1919
Reconstituted and organized as 99th Corps Observation Squadron on 2 July 1919 (Note: Clay indicates the designation for this period was 99th Aero Squadron. Clay, p. 1439.)
Redesignated: 99th Squadron (Observation) on 14 March 1921
Redesignated: 99th Observation Squadron on 25 January 1923
Inactivated on 31 July 1927

- Activated on 9 November 1928

Redesignated: 99th Bombardment Squadron on 1 March 1935
Redesignated: 99th Bombardment Squadron (Medium) on 6 December 1939
Redesignated: 99th Bombardment Squadron (Heavy) on 20 November 1940
Redesignated: 99th Bombardment Squadron, Very Heavy on 28 March 1944
Inactivated on 20 October 1948

- Redesignated 99th Strategic Reconnaissance Squadron, Photographic and activated, on 1 May 1949

Redesignated: 99th Bombardment Squadron, Heavy on 1 April 1950
Redesignated: 99th Bombardment Squadron, Medium on 2 October 1950
Redesignated: 99th Strategic Reconnaissance Squadron on 25 June 1966
Inactivated on 1 April 1971

- Activated on 1 November 1972

Redesignated: 99th Reconnaissance Squadron on 1 September 1991

=== Assignments ===
- Post Headquarters, Kelly Field, 21 August 1917
- Aviation Concentration Center, 3 November 1917
- Second Aviation Instruction Center, 12 December 1917
- First Army Observation Group, 11 March 1918 (attached to 3d Artillery Observation School, c. 1 April-31 May 1918)
- V Corps Observation Group, 7 August 1918
- Air Service Headquarters, American Expeditionary Force, 13 December 1918
- 1st Air Depot, American Expeditionary Force, 19 February 1919
- Advanced Section Services of Supply, 5 March 1919
- Post Headquarters, Mitchell Field, 24 May 1919
- Eastern Department, 25 May-9 June 1919
- Eastern Department, 2 July 1919
- Third Corps Area, 20 August 1920
- District of Washington, c. Jan 1922
- 8th Division Air Service, 24 May 1923
- Air Corps Training Center, June-31 July 1927
- Second Corps Area (attached to 9th Observation Group after 9 November 1928)
- 9th Observation Group (later 9th Bombardment Group), 15 February 1929 – 20 October 1948
- 9th Strategic Reconnaissance Group (later 9th Bombardment Group), 1 May 1949 (attached to 9th Bombardment Wing after 10 February 1951)
- 9th Bombardment Wing (later 9th Strategic Aerospace Wing, 9th Strategic Reconnaissance Wing), 16 June 1952 – 1 April 1971
- 100th Strategic Reconnaissance Wing, 1 November 1972 – 30 June 1976 (attached to Air Division, Provisional, 17th until 1 January 1975)
- 9th Strategic Reconnaissance Wing, 30 June 1976
- 9th Operations Group, 1 September 1991 – present

=== Stations ===
- Kelly Field, Texas, 21 August 1917
- Aviation Concentration Center, Garden City, New York, 3-14 Nov 1917
- Tours Aerodrome, France, 12 December 1917
- Haussimont Aerodrome, France, 11 March 1918
- Amanty Aerodrome, France, 31 May 1918
- Luxeuil-les-Bains Aerodrome, France, 1 July 1918

Flight operated from Corcieux Aerodrome, 19-24 Jul 1918
Flight operated from Dogneville Aerodrome, 24 Jul-26 Aug 1918

- Souilly Aerodrome, France, 7 September 1918
- Foucaucourt Aerodrome, France, 20 September 1918
- Parois Aerodrome, France, 4 November 1918
- Belrain Aerodrome, France, 31 November 1918
- Chaumont-sur-Aire Aerodrome, France, 13 December 1918
- Chaumont Aerodrome, France, c. 25 December 1918

Flights operated from Prauthoy Aerodrome, Bourbonne-les-Bains Aerodrome, and Montigney-le-Roi Aerodrome, France, until c. 1 February 1919

- Colombey-les-Belles Airdrome, France, 19 February 1919
- Sadirac, France, 5 Mar-8 May 1919
- Mitchel Field, New York, 24 May 1919
- Hazelhurst Field, New York, 25 May-9 Jun 1919
- Mitchel Field, New York, 2 July 1919
- Camp Alfred Vail, New Jersey, Jul 1919
- Bolling Field, DC, 17 August 1919
- Kelly Field, Texas (1927)
- Mitchel Field, New York (1928–1940)
- Río Hato Field, Panama (1940–1941)
- Piarco Airport, Trinidad (1941)
- Zandery Field, Surinam (1941–1942)
- Orlando Army Air Base, Florida (1942–1943)
- Montbrook Army Air Field, Florida (1943)
- Kissimmee Army Air Field, Florida (1943–1944)
- Brooksville Army Air Field, Florida (1944)
- Orlando Army Air Base, Florida (1944)
- Dalhart Army Air Field, Texas (1944)
- McCook Army Air Field, Nebraska (1944)
- North Field, Tinian (1944–1946)
- Clark Field, Luzon, Philippines (1946–1947)
- Harmon Air Force Base, Guam (1947–1948)
- Fairfield-Suisun Air Force Base (later Travis Air Force Base), California (1949–1953)
  - Detachment at: Andersen Air Force Base, Guam (c. 7 August – 17 September 1950)
  - Detachment at: Andersen Air Force Base, Guam (9 April – 19 June 1951)
  - Detachment at: Andersen Air Force Base, Guam (17 June – 22 September 1952)
- Mountain Home Air Force Base, Idaho (1953–1966)
  - Deployed: RAF Fairford, United Kingdom (23 May – 9 July 1955)
  - Deployed: Andersen Air Force Base, Guam (c. 4 October 1957 – c. 12 January 1958)
- Beale Air Force Base, California (1966–1971)
- U-Tapao Royal Thai Navy Airfield, Thailand (1972–1976)
- Beale Air Force Base, California (1976–present)
  - Detachment at: RAF Fairford, United Kingdom (September 2019 – present)

=== Aircraft ===
- Sopwith 1½ Strutter, 1918
- Salmson 2A2, 1918-1919
- Dayton-Wright DH-4 (1919–1927)
- Royal Aircraft Factory S.E.5 (1919–1927)
- Curtiss O-1 Falcon (1928–1936)
- Curtiss O-11 Falcon (1928–1936)
- Douglas O-25 (1928–1936)
- Loening OA-2 (1928–1936)
- Douglas O-31 (1928–1936)
- Douglas Y1O-35 (1928–1936)
- Douglas O-38 (1928–1936)
- Curtiss O-39 Falcon (1928–1936)
- Curtiss Y1O-40B Raven (1928–1936)
- Curtiss O-40 Raven (1928–1936)
- Douglas O-43 (1928–2936)
- Martin B-10 (1936–1938)
- Douglas OA-4 Dolphin (1937)
- Douglas B-18 Bolo (1938–1942)
- Sikorsky OA-8 (1939)
- Boeing P-12 (1939)
- Curtiss P-40 Warhawk (1941–1942)
- North American B-25 Mitchell (1943)
- Martin B-26 Marauder (1943)
- Boeing B-17 Flying Fortress (1943–1944, 1949–1950)
- Boeing B-29 Superfortress (1944–1946, 1946–1947, 1949–1954)
- Boeing RB-17 Flying Fortress (1949–1950)
- Boeing RB-29 Superfortress (1949–1950)
- Boeing B-47 Stratojet (1954–1966)
- Lockheed SR-71 Blackbird (1966–1971)
- Lockheed DC-130 (1972–1975)
- Sikorsky CH-3 (1972–1975)
- Lockheed U-2 Dragon Lady (1972–present)
- Lockheed TR-1 (1981-1991)
- Northrop T-38 Talon (1976–present)

== See also ==
- List of American Aero Squadrons
- List of B-47 units of the United States Air Force
- List of B-29 units of the United States Air Force
