= 13th Bomb Squadron =

US Air Force unit

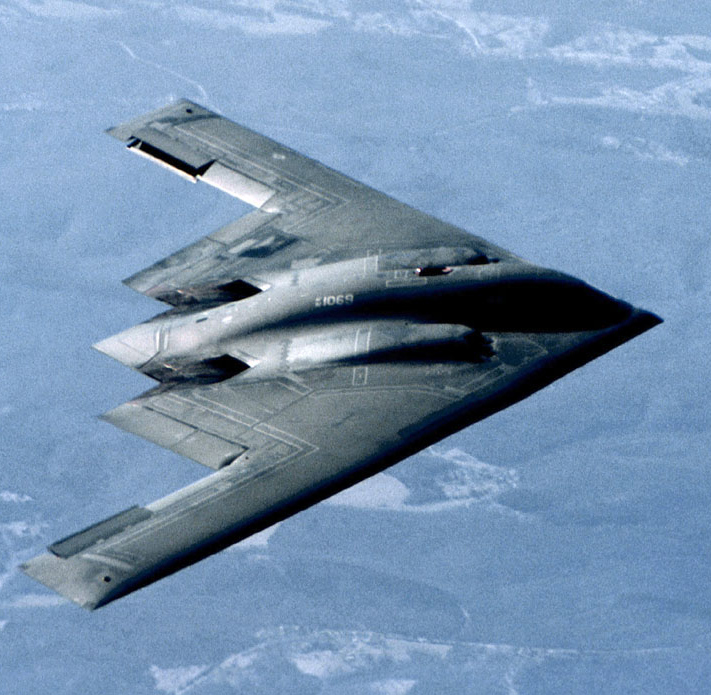
- B-2 Spirit of the 509th Operations Group
- Active: 1917–1919; 1917–1924; 1928–1929; 1929–1968; 1969–1973; 2003–present
- Country: United States
- Branch: United States Air Force
- Type: Squadron
- Role: Bombardment
- Part of: Air Force Global Strike Command
- Garrison/HQ: Whiteman Air Force Base, Missouri
- Nickname: The Devil's Own Grim Reapers
- Motto: Fear the Reaper
- Colors: Red and black
- Mascot: Oscar
- Tail Code: "WM"
- Engagements: World War I; World War II – Antisubmarine; World War II – Asia-Pacific Theater; Korean War; Vietnam War – Operation Arc Light; Vietnam Ceasefire; Afghanistan Campaign; Iraq Campaign

- Decorations: Distinguished Unit Citation (7x); Air Force Outstanding Unit Award with Combat "V" Device (6x); Air Force Outstanding Unit Award (2x); Air Force Outstanding Unit Award (5x); Philippine Presidential Unit Citation; Republic of Vietnam Gallantry Cross with Palm

Commanders
- Current commander: Lieutenant Colonel Patrick Yanez
- Notable commanders: Captain Charles Biddle; Lieutenant Colonel Rob Fortney; Lieutenant Colonel Robert McCormick; Lieutenant Colonel Thomas Bussiere

Insignia
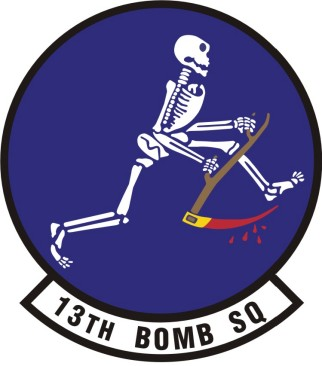
- 13th Bomb Squadron emblem (Note: The date the emblem was redrawn on a disc to comply with USAF instructions is not stated.)

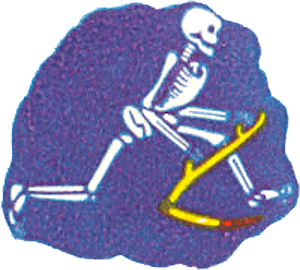
- 13th Bombardment Squadron emblem (approved 14 February 1924)

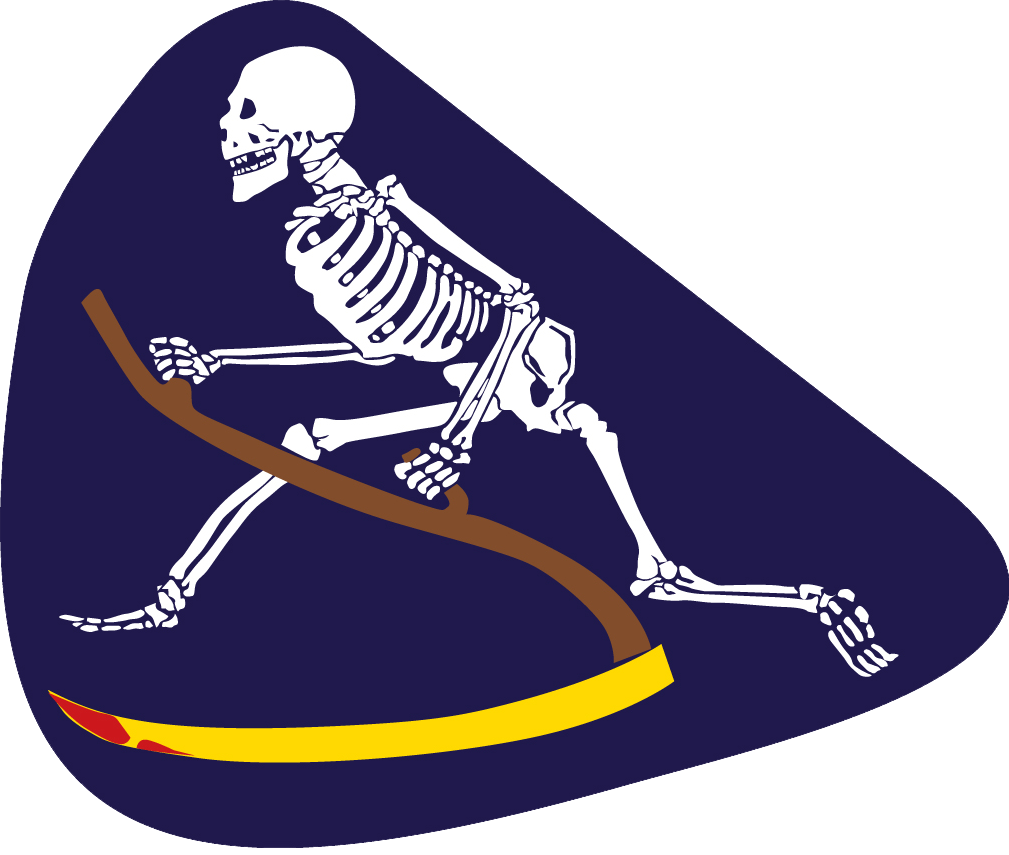
- 13th Aero Squadron emblem (approved by AEF 18 November 1918)

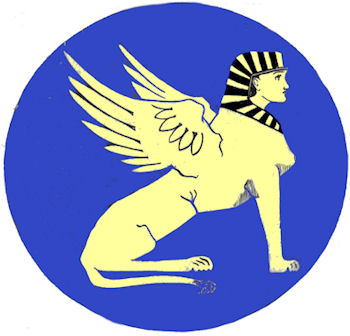
- 104th Aero Squadron emblem (approved by AEF 18 November 1918)

The 13th Bomb Squadron is a squadron of the United States Air Force. It is assigned to the 509th Operations Group, Air Force Global Strike Command, stationed at Whiteman Air Force Base, Missouri. The squadron is equipped with the Northrop Grumman B-2 Spirit Stealth Bomber.

The 13th is one of the oldest units in the United States Air Force, first being organized as the 13th Aero Squadron' on 14 June 1917 at Camp Kelly (later Kelly Field), Texas. The squadron deployed to France and fought on the Western Front during World War I as a pursuit squadron. The unit was demobilized after the war in 1919. On 16 October 1936, the squadron was consolidated with the 104th Aero Squadron, another AEF combat squadron on the Western Front, which was organized on 25 August 1917.

Reorganized in 1921 as part of the permanent United States Army Air Service, the squadron became part of Fifth Air Force in the Pacific Theater of Operations of World War II flying North American B-25 Mitchell medium bombers. During the Cold War, it fought in the Korean War and Vietnam War as a Martin B-57 Canberra tactical bomber squadron.

== History ==
The 13th Bomb Squadron traces its origins to two World War I United States Army Air Service squadrons.

=== World War I ===
The 13th Aero Squadron was formed at Camp Kelly (later Kelly Field), Texas, on 14 June 1917.

13th Aero Squadron – SPAD XIII, Souilly Aerodrome, France. 1918

The "Devil’s Own Grim Reapers" as they came to be known was a Pursuit (Fighter) squadron on the Western Front in France during 1918, flying the French SPAD S.XIII. The 13th claimed several "aces" from this period of its history: Charles J Biddle, Murray K Guthrie, Frank K Hays, John J Seerly, and William H Stovall. Major Carl Spaatz was attached to the unit at his request, and had two victories. He would rise to four-star rank during WW II. The Unit's first combat loss was Lt. George Kull on 14 September 1918 during the St. Mihiel Offensive. There would be others to follow: During the Meuse Argonne Offensive, the squadron lost Lts. Gerald D. Stivers, Henry Guion Armstrong, Clarence A. Brodie and Robert H. Stiles killed in action. It returned to the United States in March 1919 when it was demobilized. It remained inactive until it was reconstituted in 1936.

The 104th Aero Squadron was organized on 25 August 1917, also at Kelly Field. As a Corps Observation (Reconnaissance) Squadron flying the French Salmson 2A2 observation aircraft, the 104th flew reconnaissance, directed Allied artillery fire and pinpointed troop movements on the Western Front. The demand for artillery fire adjustments through aerial observation was constant in spite of difficulties encountered in air-to-ground communications. It was largely due to the photos made by aerial reconnaissance that the Allied infantry knew where it was advancing. It returned to the United States in April 1919 and became part of the permanent United States Army Air Service in 1921.

=== Inter-War period ===
After its arrival at Roosevelt Field, Long Island, most of the 104th Aero Squadron's men returned to civilian life. In May 1919, the squadron moved to neighboring Mitchel Field; the squadron was down to one officer and one enlisted man and was administratively carried by the Air Service as an active unit.

About 15 May, the 104th moved to Fort Bliss, Texas, and during June to Kelly Field, Texas, still manned in name only. On 25 May 1919 it was redesignated as the 104th Surveillance Squadron, and assigned to the Army Surveillance Group on 1 July along with the 8th, 12th and 90th Aero Squadrons. During August 1919, nearly 200 men from Mitchel Field were moved to Kelly Field to bring the squadron up to strength. The 104th quickly adapted to peacetime soldiering in the nation's infant air organization It was also equipped with new Dayton-Wright DH-4 aircraft, surplus from the World War.

==== Mexican Border patrol ====
see also: United States Army Border Air Patrol

The mission of the Army Surveillance Group was to carry out observation overflights along the Mexican Border. During this period, Mexico was enduring a period of revolution and unrest, which led to border violations and the deaths of American citizens. After being manned and equipped, in November 1919 the squadron split into three flights: Headquarters Flight and Flight A went to Fort Bliss, Texas, while Flight B deployed to Marfa Field, Texas. From 10 September to 4 November, Flight B was located at Post Field, Oklahoma, but it returned to Marfa Field on 17 November 1920, and remained there until June 1921 flying observation flights along the Big Bend area of the Texas/Mexico border.

==== 13th Squadron (Attack) ====
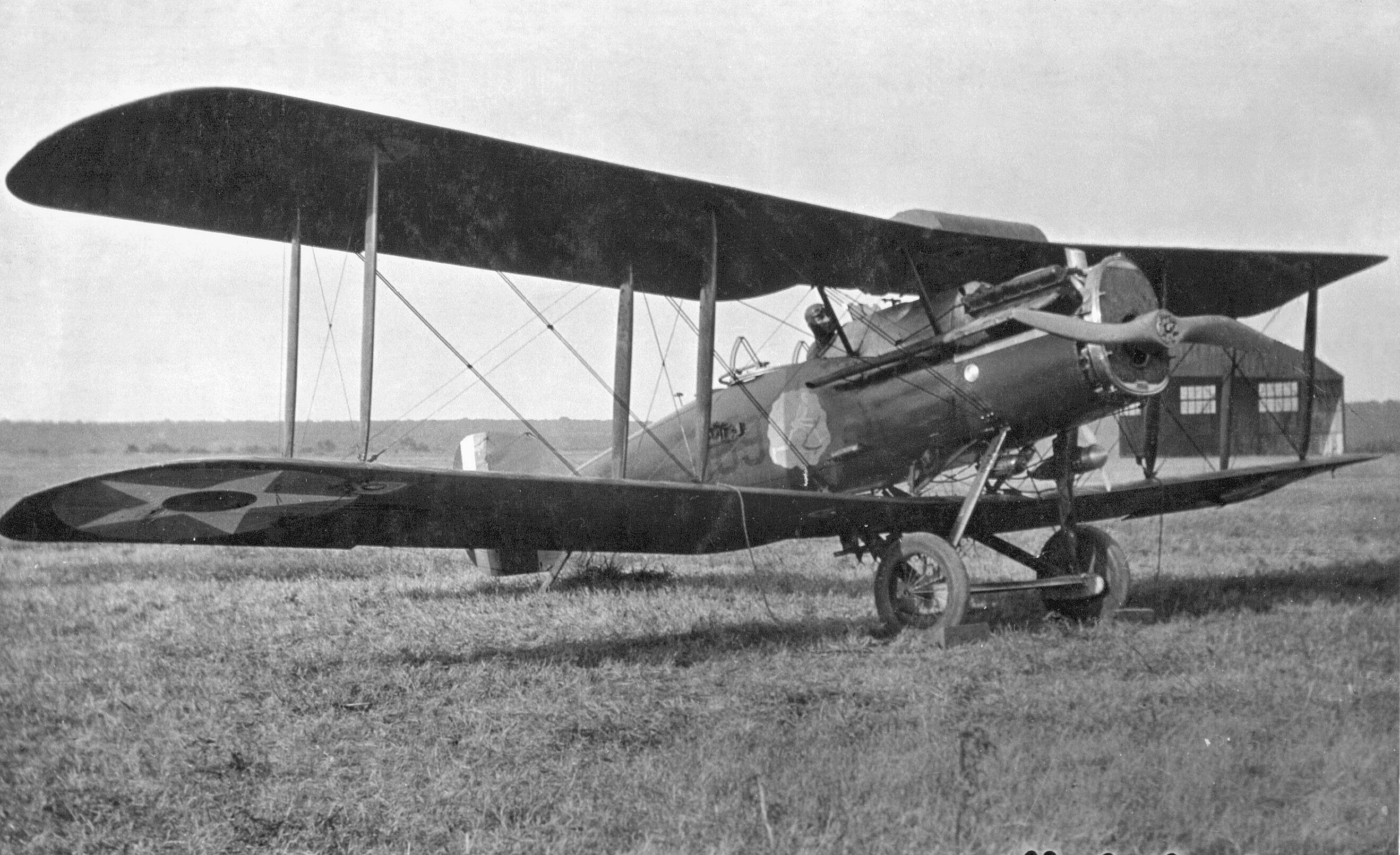
13th Squadron (Attack) – Dayton-Wright XB-1A, Kelly Field, Texas, 1921

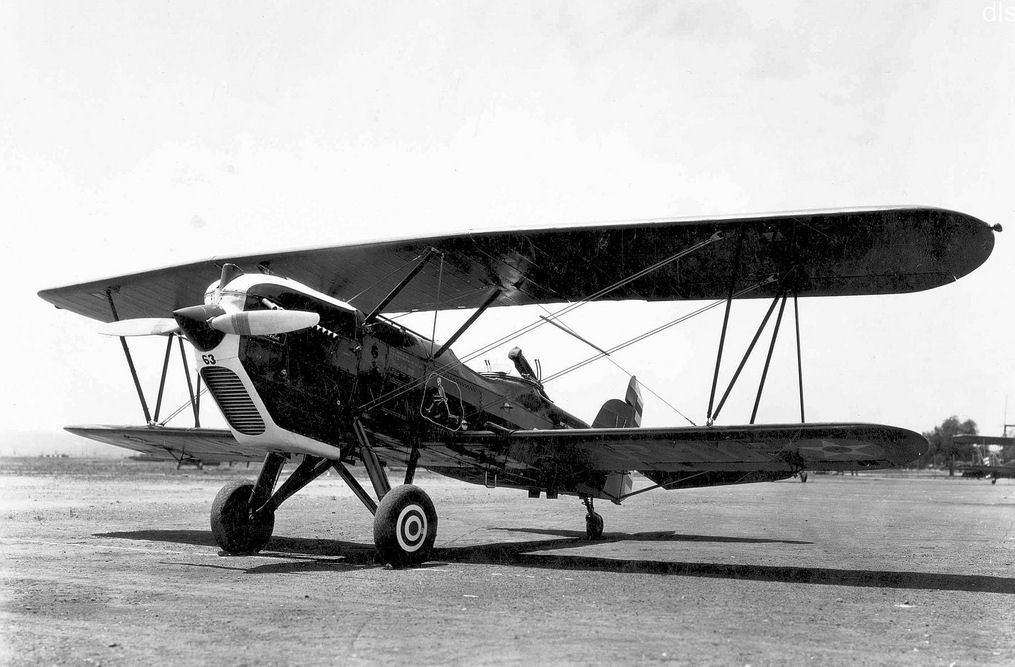
13th Attack Squadron Curtiss A-3B

On 14 March 1921 with the establishment of the permanent Army Air Service, the 104th Surveillance Squadron was redesignated as the 13th Squadron (Attack). In May the border patrol flights were ended and all of the flights were ordered to participate in maneuvers at Langley Field, Virginia. On 2 July the squadron reassembled at Kelly Field and on 25 January 1923 the squadron was redesignated the 13th Attack Squadron.

The new mission of the squadron was to conduct a series of suitability tests of new types of aircraft. Initially tested was the Dayton-Wright XB-1A, an observation plane to be used for photography, bombardment and liaison work.

The next aircraft was the GAX (Boeing GA-1), a ground attack triplane. These tests were conducted to determine the capability of aircraft under hard service incurred during long cross-country flights. All squadron officers and enlisted personnel attended classes to learn everything they could about the aircraft.

In 1923, the 13th Attack Squadron returned to the Dayton-Wright DH-4 and performed aerial demonstrations, formation flying, and normal training. Due to funding reductions, the squadron was inactivated on 27 June 1924.

==== Reserve status and reactivation ====
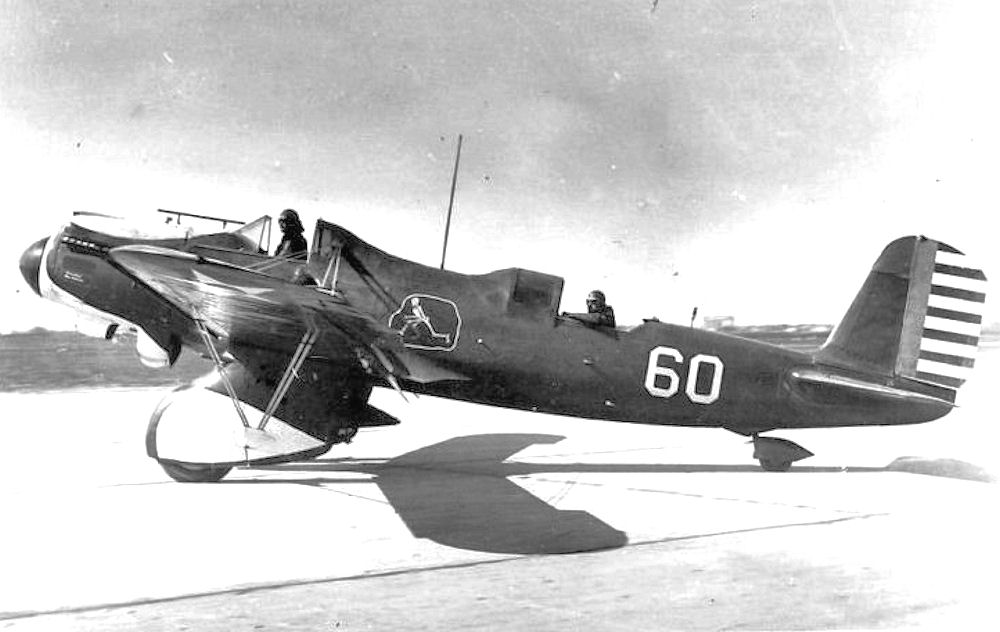
Curtiss A-8 Shrike ground-attack aircraft No.60 of the 13th Attack Squadron, 1931

After its inactivation from the active forces, the 13th was designated an Regular Army Inactive squadron, and partially manned with reserve officers. Remaining as the 13th Attack Squadron, it was allotted to the Eighth Corps Area on 28 February 1927. Organized about May 1928 with Organized Reserve personnel. Conducted summer training at Fort Crockett, with units of the 3d Attack Group.

Returned to active status on 1 November 1929, the 13th Attack Squadron again joined the 3d Attack Group at Langley Field, Virginia. Two weeks later the squadron moved to Fort Crockett, Texas. From 1929 to 1934, the squadron flew the Curtiss A-3 aircraft, and then converted to newer Curtiss A-12 Shrikes. In February 1935, the 13th moved to Barksdale Field, Louisiana. On 16 October 1936, the War Department reconstituted the World War I 13th Aero Squadron and consolidated it with the 13th Attack Squadron, forming a single squadron with two separate origins, thus perpetuating the history and traditions of both. The 13th Attack Squadron designation was retained for the consolidated unit.

Also in 1936, the squadron received the Northrop A-17 ground attack aircraft. It continued flying A-17s through 1939. On 15 September 1939 the squadron became the 13th Bombardment Squadron (Light), while its parent became the 3d Bombardment Group (Light). Douglas B-18 Bolo medium bombers were gained about this same time, but some Martin B-12s were also flown in the 1939–1941 period as the 13th developed into a proficient bombardment squadron. The 3d Bomb Group moved to Savannah Army Airfield, Georgia in October 1940, and in 1941 they received Douglas A-20A Havoc ground attack aircraft to replace their obsolescent B-18s and B-12s.

=== World War II ===
"When war came to the nation in December 1941, the Reapers embarked on an accelerated training program while also engaged in anti-submarine patrols against German U-boats along the Atlantic coast. Because every ranking and experienced man from the unit was pulled and assigned overseas to train other units, the Reapers were left without personnel and planes. When the unit arrived in Australia in January 1942, they were still without airplanes. While waiting for aircraft, the Reapers learned there were 24 brand new North American B-25 Mitchells sitting on the ramp in nearby Melbourne, but the planes were earmarked for the Dutch. Soon after, 24 Reaper pilots arrived in Melbourne, presented a confused Officer of the Day with an authorization letter, and nonchalantly flew away with the airplanes before anyone realized the mistake. The Reapers used those planes, and later A-20s, to attack bridges, transports, airfields, troop installations, seaplanes, docks, warehouses and enemy targets. At the end of the war, the squadron had earned four Distinguished Unit Citations for actions over the Philippine Island[s], Papua and New Guinea, and also took home the Philippine Presidential Unit Citation.""From the end of World War II to 1950, the [13th] remained in Japan as part of the Army of Occupation."

=== Korean War ===
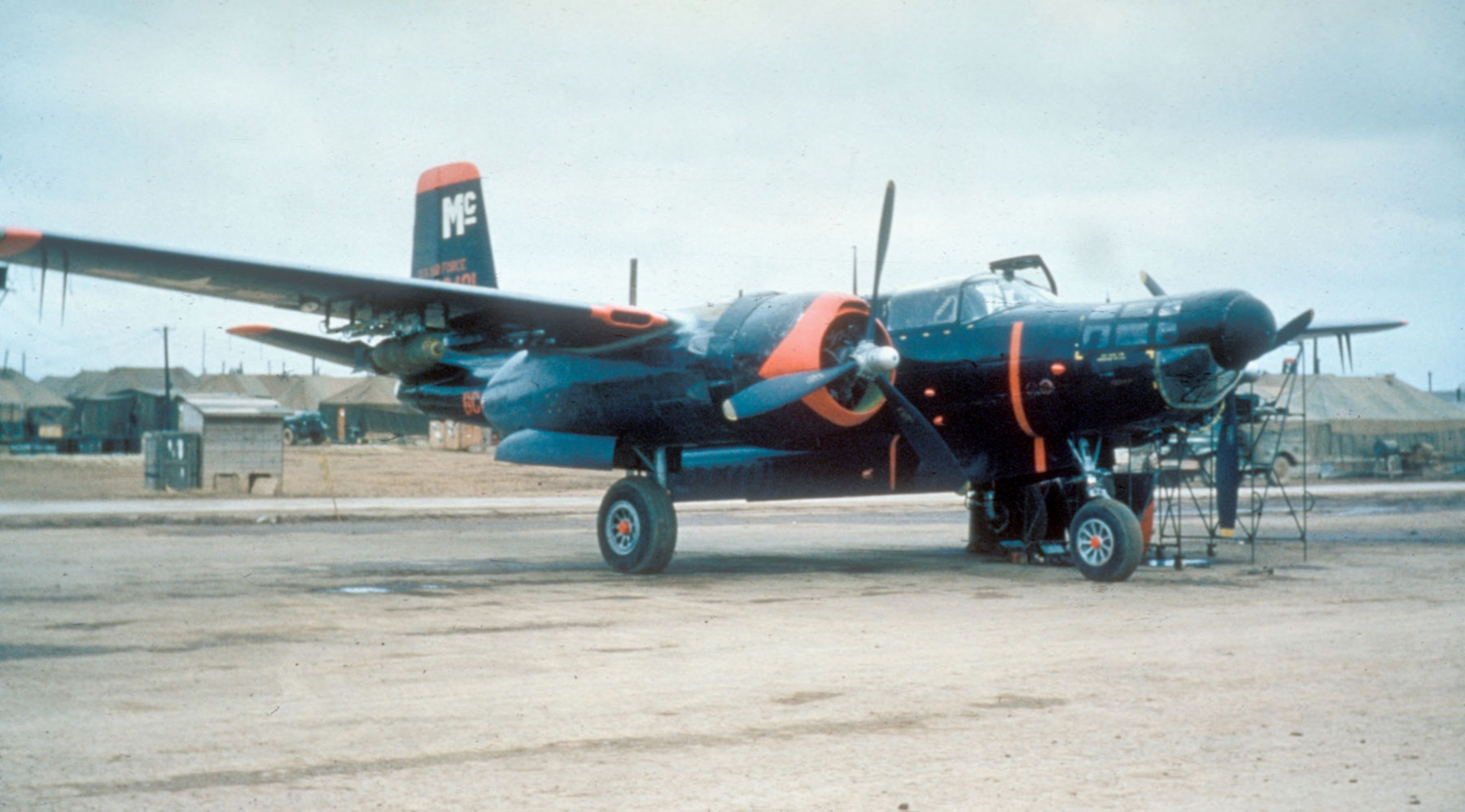
A 13th BS B-26C equipped with an infrared seeker during the Korean War

"When North Korea invaded the south in 1950, the squadron, [f]lying . . . Douglas B-26 Invaders, conducted interdiction missions during daylight raids on enemy troops and lines. On 25 June 1951, the squadron was redesignated the 13th Bombardment Squadron[,] Light-Night Intruder to reflect the unit’s "Hoot Owl" night missions. Following the end of the Korean War, the 13th remained forward deployed to Kunsan Air Base, Korea until ordered to Johnson Air Base, Japan, in 1954 to begin conversion to the Martin B-57 Canberra. On 1 October 1955, the unit was redesigned the 13th Bombardment Squadron Tactical."

=== Vietnam War ===
"The unit’s next move was to Clark Air Base, Philippines, on 10 April 1964. During the Vietnam War the Reapers took part in numerous campaigns flying the Canberra, a light twin engine jet bomber, and with the upgraded B-57G model was one of the first units to fly with a targeting pod, which was used to release some of the first ever laser guided munitions. Deployed to Tan Son Nhut Air Base, South Vietnam, by June 1964, the squadron had flown 119 combat sorties. In February 1965, an enemy attack destroyed six 13 BS B-57s at Bien Hoa Air Base and rendered the airfield unusable. Flying from Da Nang Air Base and Phan Rang Air Base, Vietnam, the unit continued to fly combat sorties until 1968. The 13th BS was then inactivated."

"The squadron remained on the shelf until 8 February 1969, when it was activated at MacDill Air Force Base, Fla., where the mission of the 13th trained members on B-57G tactics, techniques, and state of the art computer systems. On 15 September 1970, the 13th deployed to Ubon Royal Thai Air Force Base, Thailand, and on 17 October 1970, flew its first combat mission in the B-57G. The squadron flew combat missions until 12 April 1972, when personnel and equipment moved to Forbes Air Force Base, Kansas, as the squadron was reduced to paper status. The 13th was again inactivated on 30 September 1973."

=== Modern era ===
"On 14 June 2000 after more than 26 years in hibernation, the Grim Reapers returned to the active Air Force as part of the 7th Bomb Wing at Dyess Air Force Base, Texas. Shortly after 11 September 2001, the Reapers deployed with the 9th Expeditionary Bomb Squadron and performed notably in Operation Anaconda to Afghanistan in early 2002. Upon returning the Reapers were named the 7th Bomb Wing's executive agent for support of the Rockwell B-1 Lancer [t]est program. Additionally, the Reapers were responsible for supporting the B-1 Weapons Instructor Course. This relationship put the 13th in the enviable position of being the first in the operational bomber community to train on the latest upgrades . . ."

"The Reapers were deployed in early 2003 as part of Operation Iraqi Freedom to Andersen Air Force Base, Guam. Upon returning from Guam, the 13th BS was charged with devising and running the first Iron Thunder, an audacious plan calling for the scheduling of 120 missions over three days with the stated objective of the execution of 75 sorties flying 90%, or 108 sorties. The crews began flying sorties on 7 October 2003 and continued round the clock until late on 9 October. Starting in the fall of 2003, the B-1 fleet initiated a transformation with major computer and software upgrades and the Reapers were at the forefront. The 13th BS was the first operational unit assigned to fly Block E B-1s, a revolutionary upgrade which allowed a mixed load of GPS guided and unguided weapons, as well as a new air-to-air radar capability to increase the combatant commander’s options and flexibility. As the initial cadre, the Reapers were responsible for training the core of the wing’s bomber crews."

"The 13th Bomb Squadron was deployed in early 2004, again flying missions over Afghanistan. Upon returning, the squadron was tasked with leading Iron Thunder 04-4 with the goal of delivering massive concentrated firepower in another bomber surge, which carefully integrated limited range space, jet availability, and realistic threat and target scenarios. The plan resulted in 77 effective sorties in less than 68 hours. More astounding was that 47 of the sorties released a record 383 training weapons. In December 2004, for the fourth time in less than four years, the B-1s answered the call to war with all Reaper crew members and most enlisted support staff deployed as members of the 40th Air Expeditionary Group."

"In June 2005, the Air Force announced the 13th Bomb Squadron would replace the 325th Bomb Squadron at Whiteman Air Force Base, Missouri, and fly a new aircraft, the Northrop Grumman B-2 Spirit bomber. On 23 September 2005, the 13th Bomb Squadron passed the flag and time honored traditions of the unit to future Reapers at Whiteman AFB. Among its first assignments as a unit of the only stealth bomber wing in the United States Air Force, the 13th Bomb Squadron was deployed to Andersen AFB, Guam, in June 2006, to take part in the ongoing rotation which provides the U.S. Pacific Command a continuous bomber presence necessary to maintain stability and security for the Asia-Pacific region. Notable squadron achievements during this period was the firstever B-2 deployment on the continent of Australia. The historic event took place 25–27 July 2006 and featured training sorties on Australia’s Delamere Air Weapons Range and a B-2 Engine Running Crew Change at RAAF Base Darwin – the first time the B-2 landed on Australian soil."

== Lineage ==
13th Aero Squadron

- Organized as the 13th Aero Squadron on 14 June 1917

Redesignated 13th Aero Squadron (Pursuit) on 28 June 1918
Demobilized on 29 March 1919
Consolidated with the 13th Bombardment Squadron as the 13th Bombardment Squadron on 16 October 1936

13th Bomb Squadron

- Organized as the 104th Aero Squadron on 25 August 1917

Redesignated 104th Aero Squadron (Corps Observation) on 1 August 1918
Redesignated 104th Aero Squadron on 28 April 1919
Redesignated 104th Surveillance Squadron on 25 May 1919
Redesignated 13th Squadron (Attack) on 14 March 1921
Redesignated 13th Attack Squadron on 25 January 1923
Inactivated on 27 June 1924

- Designated as an active associate reserve squadron on 27 June 1924

Organized in May 1928 as an Organized Reserve unit

- Withdrawn from the reserve on 1 November 1929
- Activated on 1 November 1929

Consolidated with the 13th Aero Squadron on 16 October 1936
Redesignated 13th Bombardment Squadron (Light) on 15 September 1939
Redesignated 13th Bombardment Squadron (Dive) on 28 September 1942
Redesignated 13th Bombardment Squadron (Light) on 25 May 1943
Redesignated 13th Bombardment Squadron, Light, Night Intruder on 25 June 1951
Redesignated 13th Bombardment Squadron, Tactical on 1 October 1955
Discontinued and inactivated on 15 January 1968

- Activated on 8 February 1969

Redesignated 13th Fighter Squadron on 1 July 1973
Inactivated and redesignated 13th Bombardment Squadron, Tactical on 30 September 1973

- Redesignated 13th Bomb Squadron on 1 May 2000

Activated on 14 June 2000

=== Assignments ===
13th Aero Squadron

- Post Headquarters, Kelly Field, 14 June 1917
- Post Headquarters, Wilbur Wright Field, 8 July 1917
- Aviation Concentration Center, 1 November 1917
- Winchester Rest Camp, England, 26 December 1917
- Le Havre Rest Camp, France, 27 December 1917
- Replacement Concentration Center, AEF, France, 1 January 1918
- 3d Air Instructional Center, 26 January 1918
- 1st Air Depot, 5 June 1918
- 2d Pursuit Group, 28 June 1918
- 1st Air Depot, AEF, 16 December 1918
- Advanced Section Services of Supply, 6 February-3 March 1919
- Post Headquarters, Mitchel Field, 13–29 March 1919

13th Bomb Squadron

- Post Headquarters, Kelly Field, 25 August 1917
- Aviation Concentration Center, 30 October 1917
- American Expeditionary Forces, 7 December 1917

Attached to the Royal Flying Corps for training, 7 December 1917 – 19 July 1918

- Replacement Concentration Center, AEF, France, 22 July 1918
- 1st Observation Group School, 1 August 1918
- V Corps Observation Group, 4 August 1918
- 1st Air Depot, AEF, 14 January 1919
- Advanced Section Services of Supply, 29 January 1919
- Post Headquarters, Roosevelt Field, 28 April 1919
- Post Headquarters, Mitchel Field, 1 May 1919
- Army Surveillance Group (later 1st Surveillance Group, 3d Attack Group), 1 July 1919 – 27 June 1924
- Eighth Corps Area, 1924–1929 (reserve-manned Regular Army Inactive unit)
- 3d Attack Group (later 3d Bombardment Group), 1 November 1929 (attached to 3d Bombardment Wing after 13 August 1956)
- 3d Bombardment Wing, 25 October 1957 (attached to 41st Air Division after 1 September 1963)
- 41st Air Division, 8 January 1964
- Thirteenth Air Force, c. 10 April 1964 (attached to 405th Fighter Wing after 10 April 1964)
- 405th Fighter Wing, 18 November 1964 – 15 January 1968 (attached to: 2d Air Division 5 August–3 November 1964, 17 February–21 June 1965; 6252d Tactical Fighter Wing, 16 August–16 October 1965, 16 December 1965 – 17 February 1966; 35th Tactical Fighter Wing, 17 April–17 June 1966, 14 August–13 October 1966, 12 December 1966 – 11 February 1967, 11 April–8 June 1967, 1 August–26 September 1967, 21 November 1967 – 15 January 1968)
- 15th Tactical Fighter Wing, 8 February 1969
- Pacific Air Forces, 15 September 1970 (attached to 8th Tactical Fighter Wing)
- 8th Tactical Fighter Wing, 31 October 1970
- 405th Fighter Wing, c. 24 December 1972 – 30 September 1973
- 7th Operations Group, 14 June 2000
- 509th Operations Group, 9 September 2005 – present

=== Stations ===
13th Aero Squadron

- Kelly Field, Texas, 14 June 1917
- Wilbur Wright Field, Ohio, 8 July 1917
- Aviation Concentration Center, Garden City, New York, 1 November-3 December 1917
- St. Maixent Replacement Barracks, France, 1 January 1918
- Issoudun Aerodrome, France, 27 January 1918

Detachment at: Meucon Aerodrome, France, 6 April-c. 11 May 1918
Detachment at: Haussimont Aerodrome, France, c. 11 May-c. 24 June 1918

- Colombey-les-Belles Airdrome, France, 5 June 1918
- Gengault Aerodrome (Toul), France, 28 June 1918
- Belrain Aerodrome, France, 23 September 1918
- Souilly Aerodrome, France, 23 September 1918
- Colombey-les-Belles Airdrome, France, 16 December 1918
- Le Mans, France, 6 February 1919
- Brest, France, 1 March 1919
- Mitchel Field, New York, NY, 13–29 March 1919

13th Bomb Squadron

- Kelly Field, Texas, 25 August 1917
- Aviation Concentration Center, Garden City, New York, 30 October 1917
- Liverpool, England, 7 December
- Windall Rest Camp, Winchester, England, 8 December 1918

Headquarters Flight at RFC Upavon, later at Netheravon, England
Other flights assigned to RFC Salisbury, RFC Andover and RFC Yatesbury, England

- Winchester, England, 10 July 1918
- Le Havre, France, 19 July 1918
- St. Maixent Replacement Barracks, France, 22 Julyl 1918
- Amanty Airdrome, France, 1 August 1918
- Epiez Aerodrome, France, 4 August 1918
- Luxeuil-les-Bains Aerodrome, France, 8 August 1918
- Souilly Aerodrome, France, 8 September 1918
- Foucaucourt Aerodrome, 20 September 1918
- Parois Airdrome, France,4 November 1918

Flight operated from: Barricourt Airdrome, France, 10–30 November 1918

- Belrain Aerodrome, France, 30 November 1918
- Colombey-les-Belles Airdrome, France, 14 January 1919
- Saint-Denis-de-Pile, France, 29 January 1919
- Libourne, France, 3 February 1919
- Bordeaux, France, 10 April 1919
- Roosevelt Field, New York, 28 April 1919
- Mitchel Field, New York, c. 1 May 1919
- Fort Bliss, Texas, c. 15 May 1919
- Kelly Field, Texas, June 1919
- Fort Bliss, Texas, 6 November 1919

Flight operated from: Marfa Field, Texas, c. 6 November 1919 – 3 September 1920
Flight operated from: Post Field, Oklahoma, 10 September – 4 November 1920
Flight operated from: Marfa Field, Texas, 17 November 1920 – June 1921

- Kelly Field, Texas, 2 July 1921 – 27 June 1924
- Fort Crockett, Texas, 1924–1929 (summer training as reserve Unit)
- Langley Field, Virginia, 1 November 1929
- Fort Crockett, Texas, 17 November 1929
- Barksdale Field, Louisiana, 27 February 1935 – consolidation
- Hunter Field, Georgia, 10 October 1940 – 19 January 1942
- Oakland Airport, California, 23–31 January 1942
- Brisbane, Australia, 25 February 1942
- Charters Towers Airfield, Australia, 10 March 1942

Detachment operated from Del Monte Airfield, Mindanao, Philippines, 12–14 April 1942

- Kila Airfield, Port Moresby, New Guinea, 3 November 1942
- Charters Towers Airfield, Australia, 25 November 1942
- Schwimmer Airfield, Port Moresby, New Guinea, 16 December 1942
- Dobodura Airfield Complex, New Guinea, 22 May 1943
- Nadzab Airfield Complex, New Guinea, 1 February 1944
- Hollandia Airfield Complex, Netherlands East Indies, c. 21 May 1944
- Dulag Airfield, Leyte, Philippines, 20 November 1944
- McGuire Field, Mindoro, Philippines, 30 December 1944
- Motobu Airfield, Okinawa, c. 7 August 1945
- Atsugi Airfield, Japan, c. 10 October 1945
- Yokota Air Force Base (later Yokota Air Base), Japan, 1 September 1946
- Johnson Air Base, Japan, 10 March 1950
- Iwakuni Air Base, Japan, 2 July 1950 (temporary)
- Johnson Air Base, Japan, c. 20 July 1950
- Yokota Air Base, Japan, 14 August 1950
- Iwakuni Air Base, Japan, 1 December 1950
- Kunsan Air Base (K-8), South Korea, 13 August 1951
- Johnson Air Base, Japan, 1 October 1954
- Yokota Air Base, Japan, 17 November 1960
- Clark Air Base, Luzon, Philippines, 10 April 1964 – 15 January 1968

Deployed to Bien Hoa Air Base, South Vietnam, 5 August – 3 November 1964; 17 February – 16 May 1965
Deployed to Tan Son Nhut Air Base, South Vietnam, 16 May – 21 June 1965
Deployed to Da Nang Air Base, South Vietnam, 16 August – 16 October 1965; 16 December 1965 – 17 February 1966; 17 April – 17 June 1966
Operated from Bien Hoa Air Base, South Vietnam, 15–22 May 1966; 14 August – 9 October 1966
Operated from Phan Rang Air Base, South Vietnam, 10–13 October 1966; 12 December 1966 – 11 February 1967; 11 April – 8 June 1967; 1 August – 26 September 1967; 21 November 1967 – 15 January 1968

- MacDill Air Force Base, Florida, 8 February 1969 – 15 September 1970
- Ubon Royal Thai Air Force Base, Thailand, 15 September 1970
- Clark Air Base, Luzon, Philippines, c. 24 December 1972 – 30 September 1973
- Dyess Air Force Base, Texas, 14 June 2000
- Whiteman Air Force Base, Missouri, 3 June 2005 – present

=== Aircraft ===
- Curtiss JN-4, 1917
- SPAD S.XIII, 1918
- Salmson 2.A2, 1918–1919
- Dayton-Wright DH-4, 1919–1922, 1929–1934
- Dayton-Wright XB-1A, 1921–1922
- Boeing GA-1, 1922–23
- Curtiss A-3, 1929–1934
- Curtiss A-12 Shrike, 1934–1936
- Northrop A-17, 1936–1941
- Martin B-12, 1941
- Douglas B-18 Bolo, 1941
- North American B-25 Mitchell, 1942–1945
- Douglas A-20 Havoc, 1944–1945
- Douglas B-26 Invader, 1945–1956
- Martin B-57B Canberra, 1956–1958
- Martin B-57G Tropic Moon, 1969–1972
- Rockwell B-1B Lancer, 2000–2005
- Northrop Grumman B-2A Spirit, 2005–present
- Northrop T-38A Talon, 2018-present

== See also ==
- List of American aero squadrons
