= 104th Aero Squadron =

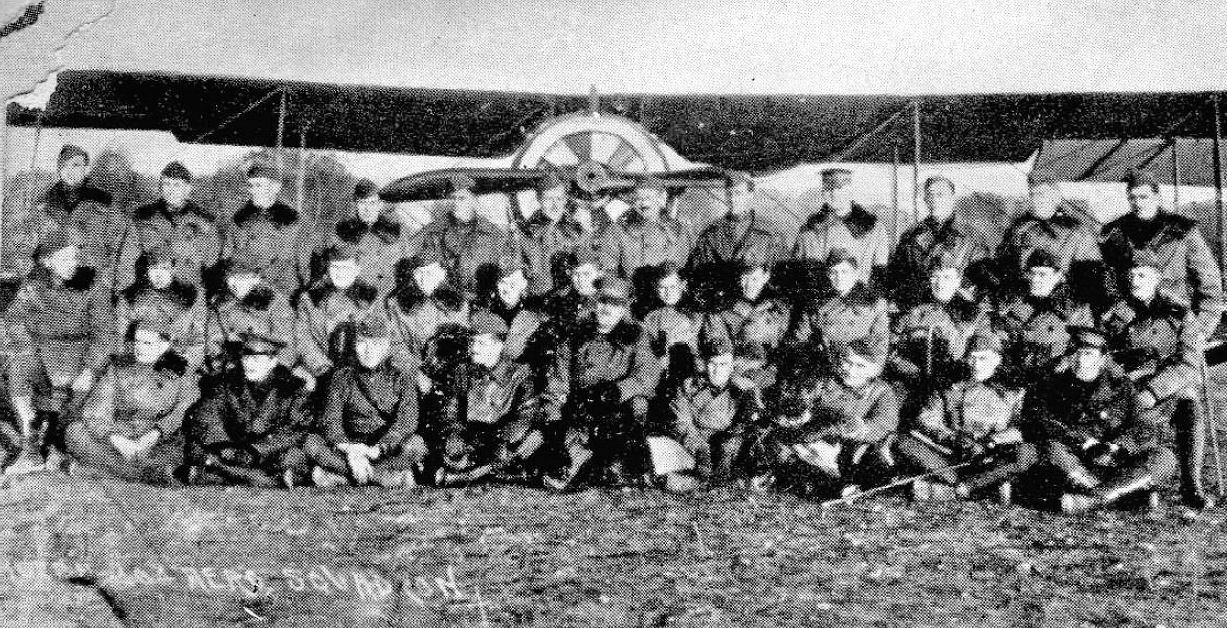
- 104th Aero Squadron - Foucaucourt Aerodrome, November 1918
- Active: 25 August 1917 – 14 March 1921
- Country: United States
- Branch: Air Service, United States Army
- Type: Squadron
- Role: Corps Observation
- Part of: American Expeditionary Forces (AEF)
- Engagements: World War I

Commanders
- Notable commanders: Capt. Clearton H. Reynolds; Capt. William R. Holcombe; Capt. Dogan H. Arthur

Insignia
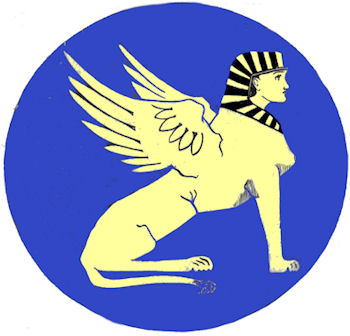
- 104th Aero Squadron Emblem

Aircraft flown
- Reconnaissance: Salmson 2A2, 1918-1919

Service record
- Operations: V Corps Observation Group; Western Front, France: 7 August-11 November 1918: Sorties: 474; Combat missions: 160; Enemy combats: 25; Killed: 1; Wounded: 2; Missing: 1; Aircraft lost: 15
- Victories: Enemy Aircraft shot down: 1; Enemy Balloons shot down: 0; Total Enemy Aircraft Destroyed: 1

The 104th Aero Squadron was an Air Service, United States Army unit that fought on the Western Front during World War I.

The squadron was assigned as a Corps Observation Squadron, performing short-range, tactical reconnaissance over the V Corps, United States First Army sector of the Western Front in France, providing battlefield intelligence. After the 1918 Armistice with Germany, the squadron returned to the United States in June 1919 and became part of the permanent United States Army Air Service in 1921, when it was redesignated as the 13th Squadron (Attack) .

The current United States Air Force unit which continues its lineage and history is the 13th Bomb Squadron, assigned to the 509th Operations Group at Whiteman Air Force Base, Missouri.

== History ==
The 104th Aero Squadron was organized on 25 August 1917. The unit was formed from all the unassigned recruits at Kelly Field, Texas, who were lined up in formation and 150 men were counted off to form the squadron. No attention was paid to the capabilities of its members at the time, because there were no facilities at Kelly Field for trade testing or flight training. The unit was instructed in close order drill and ordinary post duties.

The urgency of the need for men in France led to the squadron receiving orders to report to the Aviation Concentration Center at Garden City, New York, on 30 October. On 28 November the squadron sailed aboard the SS Baltic and arrived at Liverpool, England, on 7 December. The next day, the squadron proceeded to Winchester where they were quartered at the Windall Rest Camp. The Air Service attached the 104th to the British Royal Flying Corps for training. At Winchester, the squadron was split into four flights, with each flight going to a separate English flying school for training.

The headquarters flight was established at Winchester, before moving to the Central Flying School at RFC Upavon and then to Netheravon. Other flights went to the Mechanics School at RFC Salisbury, RFC Andover and the motor transport school at RFC Yatesbury.

On 10 July 1918, all four flights met at Winchester to prepare for movement to France, but an outbreak of Spanish influenza delayed their movement across the English Channel to Le Havre, France, until 19 July. On the same day the squadron boarded a troop train and arrived at the American Expeditionary Force (AEF) St. Maixent Replacement Barracks on 22 July. After being processed and properly equipped, the squadron first moved to Amanty Airdrome on 1 August where the 104th was classified as a Corps Observation squadron. It then was moved to Epiez Aerodrome on 4 August, where the squadron received its first aircraft, French Salmson 2A2s and was assigned to the V Corps Observation Group. On 8 August the 104th was transferred to the "Zone of Advance" and proceeded to Luxeuil-les-Bains Aerodrome where it joined the 88th and 99th Aero Squadrons of the group.

By 8 September the squadron was ready for action, and it moved to Souilly Aerodrome where it participated in the St. Mihiel offensive, serving primarily as the eyes of the artillery. Pilots flew reconnaissance, directed Allied artillery fire and pinpointed troop movements. The demand for artillery fire adjustments through aerial observation was constant in spite of difficulties encountered with air-to-ground communication. It was largely due to the photographs made by aerial reconnaissance that the Allied infantry knew where it was advancing. As the war progressed the demand for observation and reconnaissance by the 104th increased.

During the Meuse-Argonne offensive, the 104th operated from Foucaucourt Aerodrome (near Verdun). The squadron continued its previous operations and also engaged the enemy in aerial combat and attacked enemy machine-gun nests. It also dropped thousands of propaganda leaflets over German lines and thousands of newspapers to American soldiers. In the final days of the war the 104th operated from Parois Airdrome, with a flight deployed at Barricourt.

The war ended on 11 November 1918, and by the end of that month the 104th was at Belrain Aerodrome, where it remained until it could return home. Finally, on 14 January 1919, orders were received to proceed to the 1st Air Depot at Colombey-les-Belles Airdrome, where its equipment would be turned in. The squadron's Salmson aircraft were delivered to the Air Service American Air Service Acceptance Park No. 1 at Orly Aerodrome to be returned to the French. There practically all of the pilots and observers were detached from the squadron. Personnel at Colombey proceeded to a staging camp at Libourne on 3 February where it remained until moving to the port of Bordeaux on 10 April. On 18 April, the squadron boarded the USS Orizaba, and nine days later it disembarked in New York.

The wholesale discharge of personnel soon depleted the 104th's strength. In May the squadron was down to one officer and one enlisted man and was classified as an administrative unit without personnel or equipment at Mitchel Field. New York.

For subsequent history see 13th Bomb Squadron

== Lineage ==
- Organized as 104th Aero Squadron on 25 August 1917

Redesignated 104th Aero Squadron (Corps Observation) on 1 August 1918
Redesignated 104th Aero Squadron on 28 April 1919
Redesignated 104th Surveillance Squadron on 25 May 1919

=== Assignments ===
- Post Headquarters, Kelly Field, 25 August 1917
- Aviation Concentration Center, 30 October 1917
- Air Service Headquarters, AEF, British Isles, 7 December 1917

Attached to the Royal Flying Corps for training, 7 December 1917 – 19 July 1918

- Replacement Concentration Center, AEF, France, 22 July 1918
- 1st Observation Group School, 1 August 1918
- V Corps Observation Group, 4 August 1918
- 1st Air Depot, AEF, 14 January 1919
- Commanding General, Services of Supply, 29 January 1919
- Post Headquarters, Roosevelt Field, 28 April 1919

=== Stations ===
- Kelly Field, Texas, 25 August 1917
- Aviation Concentration Center, Garden City, New York, 30 October 1917
- Port of Entry, Hoboken, New Jersey

Overseas transport: SS Baltic, 28 November-7 December 1917

- Liverpool, England, 7 December
- Windall Rest Camp, Winchester, England, 8 December 1918

Headquarters Flight at RFC Upavon, later at Netheravon, England
Other flights assigned to RFC Salisbury, RFC Andover and RFC Yatesbury, England

- Winchester, England, 10 July 1918
- Le Havre, France, 19 July 1918
- St. Maixent Replacement Barracks, France, 22 July 1918
- Amanty Aerodrome, France, 1 August 1918
- Epiez Aerodrome, France, 4 August 1918
- Luxeuil-les-Bains Aerodrome, France, 8 August 1918
- Souilly Aerodrome, France, 8 September 1918
- Foucaucourt Aerodrome, 20 September 1918
- Parois Airdrome, France,4 November 1918

Flight operated from: Barricourt Airdrome, France, 10–30 November 1918

- Belrain Aerodrome, France, 30 November 1918
- Colombey-les-Belles Airdrome, France, 14 January 1919
- Saint-Denis-de-Pile, France, 29 January 1919
- Libourne, France, 3 February 1919
- Port of Bordeaux, France, 10 April 1919

Return transport: USS Orizaba, 18–27 April 1919

- Roosevelt Field, New York, 28 April 1919

=== Combat sectors and campaigns ===
Streamer	Sector/Campaign	Dates	Notes
	St. Mihiel Offensive Campaign	12–16 September 1918	
	Meuse-Argonne Offensive Campaign	26 September-11 November 1918	

=== Notable personnel ===
- Lt. Flynn L. A. Andrew, DSC
- Lt. George S. Clark, SSC
- Lt. Mortimer M. Lawrence, SSC
- Lt. Edward M. Morris, DSC
- Lt. Clearton H. Reynolds, DSC

DSC: Distinguished Service Cross; SSC: Silver Star Citation

== See also ==
- Organization of the Air Service of the American Expeditionary Force
- List of American aero squadrons
