= Haussimont Airdrome =

World War I airfield in France

Haussimont Aerodrome
- Part of American Expeditionary Forces (AEF)
- Located near: Goussancourt, France
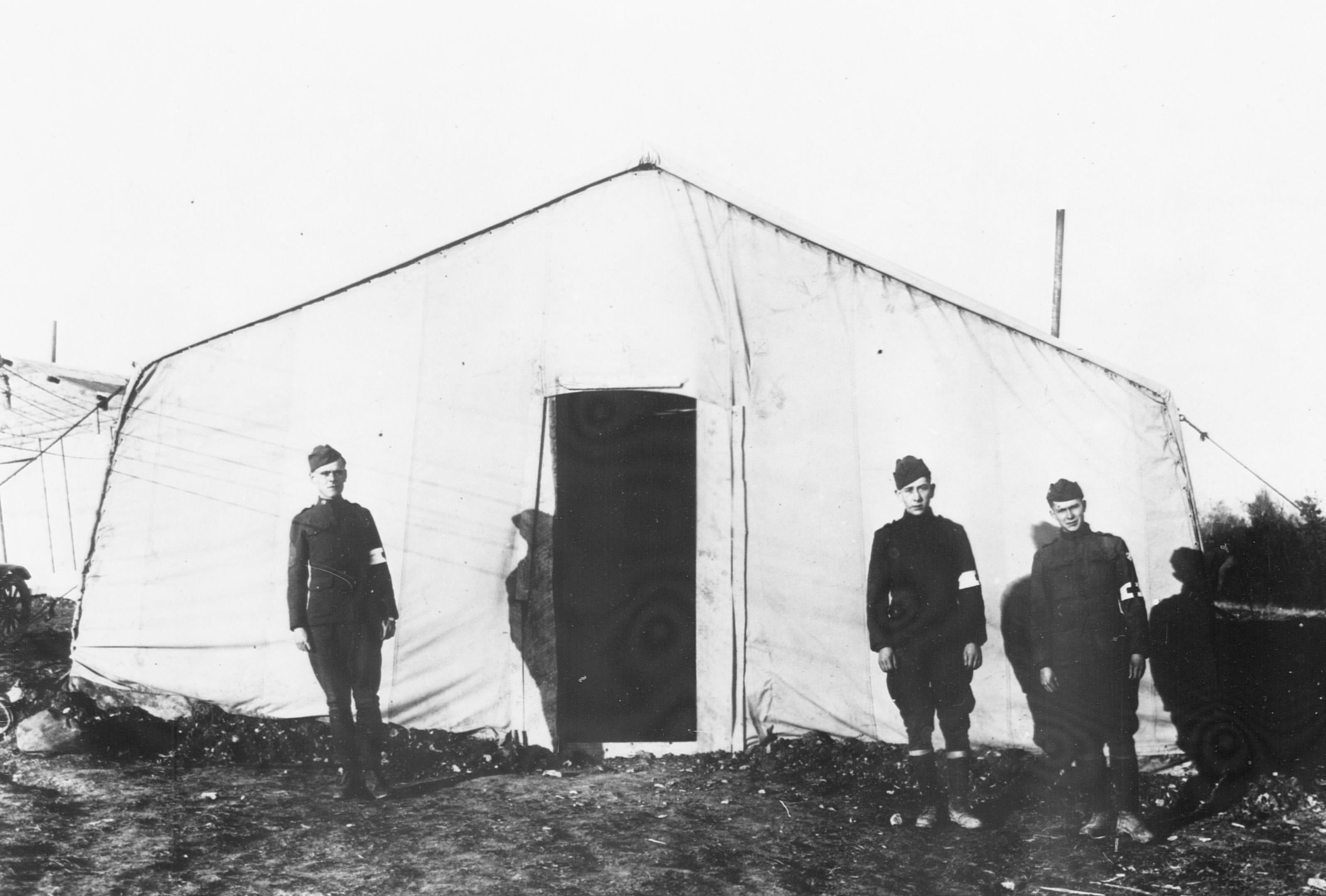
- Medical flight personnel of the 99th Aero Squadron standing in front of a hospital tent

Site information
- Type: Combat Airfield
- Controlled by: Air Service, United States Army
- Condition: Agricultural area

Location
- Coordinates: 48°44′51″N 004°10′03″E; Approximate Location

Site history
- Built: 1918
- In use: 1918–1919
- Battles/wars: World War I

Garrison information
- Garrison: V Corps Observation Group; United States First Army Air Service

Haussimont Aerodrome, was a World War I airfield in France, used by the French Air Force, and by the Air Service, United States Army. It was located near the commune of Haussimont, in the Marne department in north-eastern France.

== Overview ==
The airfield was originally built for the French "Aeronautique Militaire", perhaps as a satellite to the observation school at nearby Sommesous. In early 1918, it was turned over to the Air Service, United States Army, and used by the 99th Aero Squadron from 11 March 1918, in charge of flying for the US 3d Artillery Observation School which had been created at the Mailly-le-Camp training grounds. On 31 May, the squadron received orders to move to Amanty Aerodrome, where it worked for the I Corps Observation Group School.

The airfield sheltered two pursuit Aero Squadrons (13th and 95th) from 11 May to 24 June, most likely for their further training, as the airfield was rather far from the front line and they both were at their final stage of organization.

The airfield was located at the southwest corner of the N 4 and D 318 crossroads, south of Haussimont - the other corners being occupied by artillery depots.

After the Armistice was signed, the airfield was used for some time by the French air service as an annex to the demobilization center set up at Sommesous.

From 1921 onwards, the airfield was used for some years as an emergency airfield, but nothing remained by 1938, as from aerial photographies.

== Known units assigned ==
- 99th Aero Squadron (Schooling) 11 March – 31 May 1918
- 95th Aero Squadron, (Pursuit) 11 May – 24 June 1918, on training
- Detachment of 13th Aero Squadron, (Pursuit) 11 May – 24 June 1918, on training

== See also ==
- List of Air Service American Expeditionary Force aerodromes in France
