= Parois Airdrome =

World War I airfield in France

- Part of American Expeditionary Forces (AEF)
- Located near: Aubréville, France
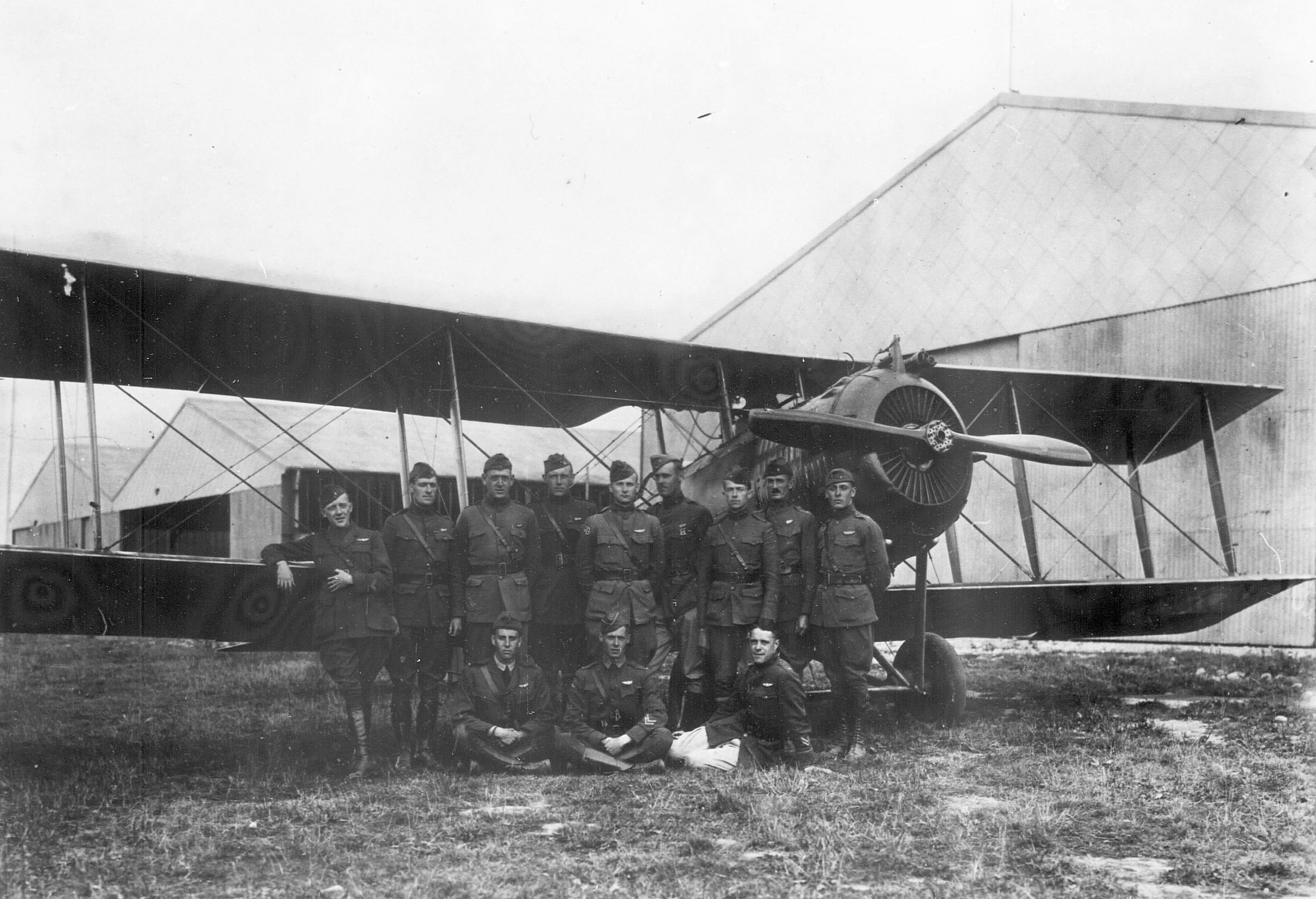
- Pilots of the 99th Aero Squadron in front of a squadron Salmson 2A2 reconnaissance aircraft

Site information
- Type: Combat Airfield
- Controlled by: Air Service, United States Army
- Condition: Agricultural area

Location
- Coordinates: 49°08′18″N 005°07′02″E; Approximate Location

Site history
- Built: 1918
- In use: 1918–1919
- Battles/wars: World War I

Garrison information
- Garrison: V Corps Observation Group; United States First Army Air Service

Parois Airdrome, was a temporary World War I airfield in France, used in 1918 by the Air Service, United States Army. It was located approximately 16 miles (26 km) west of the city of Verdun in the Lorraine region in northeastern France.

== Overview ==
The airfield was built during the early fall of 1918 as a forward operations base, and was used during the last days of the war by the United States First Army Air Service V Corps Observation Group during the Meuse-Argonne Offensive. Two squadrons of aircraft operated from the field, primarily taking aerial photography, performing battlefield adjustments and making artillery adjustments. It likely consisted of a few tents and perhaps some canvas and steel-tubing hangars. After the 11 November Armistice, the Group was reassigned to the Rhineland as part of the Third Army of Occupation and Parois Airdrome was turned over to the French Government. Almost at the same time, two French "escadrilles", BR 214 and SPA 215, were stationed at Parois, flying missions for US First Army (they were actually French Second Army Air Service, which Army was fighting under American command). They moved away on 25 November 1918.

Subsequently, the airfield was returned to agricultural use. Its exact location in the Parois area is undetermined.

== Known units assigned ==
- 50th Aero Squadron (Observation with I Corps Obs. Group) 28 November - 6 December 1918
- Headquarters, V Corps Observation Group, 4–11 November 1918
- 99th Aero Squadron (Observation) 4–31 November 1918
- 104th Aero Squadron (Observation) 4–30 November 1918

== See also ==
- List of Air Service American Expeditionary Force aerodromes in France
