= Belrain Aerodrome =

Temporary World War I airfield in France

- Part of American Expeditionary Forces (AEF)

Site information
- Type: Combat Airfield
- Controlled by: Air Service, United States Army
- Condition: Agricultural area

Location
- Coordinates: 48°51′10″N 005°18′16″E

Site history
- Built: 1918
- In use: 1918–1919
- Battles/wars: World War I

Garrison information
- Garrison: 2d Pursuit Group; III Corps Observation Group; United States First Army Air Service

Belrain Aerodrome was a temporary World War I airfield in France, initially used by French units, and later by squadrons of the Air Service, United States Army. It was located 0.7 miles (1.1 km) south of Belrain, approximately 35 miles (56 km) west-north-west of Toul. in the Meuse department in the Lorraine region in northeastern France.

== Overview ==
Construction of Belrain Aerodrome was originally started by the French "Aeronautique Militaire" on the plateau between Belrain and Erize-la-Brulée, with a few escadrilles stationed between August 1917 and August 1918. When turned over to the Air Service, United States Army in August 1918, the airfield could shelter 86 aircraft in eight "Bessonneau" aircraft hangars; there was no telephone or electrical system, and the Air Service engineers from a detachment of the 484th Aero Squadron (Construct.) put up a series of tents for personnel to live, eat and perform their duties in the early days of September.

Once made ready for use, Belrain was assigned to the 2d Pursuit Group in late September 1918. It was used as a pursuit (fighter) field during both the St. Mihiel and Meuse-Argonne Offensives, with four squadrons of aircraft.

Known units assigned to Belrain Airdrome were:

- Headquarters, 2d Pursuit Group, 23 September – 11 December 1918 (SPAD S.XII)

13th Aero Squadron (Pursuit) 23 September – 6 November 1918
49th Aero Squadron (Pursuit) 23 September – 6 November 1918
139th Aero Squadron (Pursuit) 24 September – 7 November 1918
22d Aero Squadron (Pursuit) 22 September – 7 November 1918

In support of the flying squadrons, the 4th Air Park had a flight of mechanics for repair of both aircraft and vehicles. The Air Service engineers expanded Aerodrome by building a series of support buildings and quarters for personnel, primarily in the woods to the east of the airfield.

The four squadrons moved to Souilly Aerodrome on 6–7 November 1918, but the HQ 2nd Pursuit Group stayed in Belrain until it was demobilized on next 11 December.

After the armistice in November 1918, the V Corps Observation Group moved into Belrain with two squadrons assigned to it.

- V Corps Observation Group (Salmson 2A.2)

104th Aero Squadron (Observation) 30 November 1918 – 14 January 1919
99th Aero Squadron (Observation) 31 November – 13 December 1918

Last squadron to use the field, the 90th Aero Squadron (Observation) spent a short spell at Belrain on his way to demobilization in Colombey les Belles, 15–18 January 1919.

By the end of January 1919, the airfield was abandoned, and turned over to the 1st Air Depot for de-construction. All hangars and other structures were dismantled and all useful supplies and equipment were removed and sent back to the Depot for storage. Upon completion, the land turned over to the French government.

Eventually the land was returned to agricultural use by the local farmers. Today, what was Belrain Aerodrome is a series of cultivated fields located on the south side of the Départmental 121 (D121), east of Erize-la-Brulée, with no indications of its wartime use. The wooded area to the east of the Airfield remains a forested area.

== See also ==
- List of Air Service American Expeditionary Force aerodromes in France
