= Luxeuil - Saint-Sauveur Air Base =

Luxeuil - Saint-Sauveur Air Base Base aérienne 116 Luxeuil Saint-Sauveur

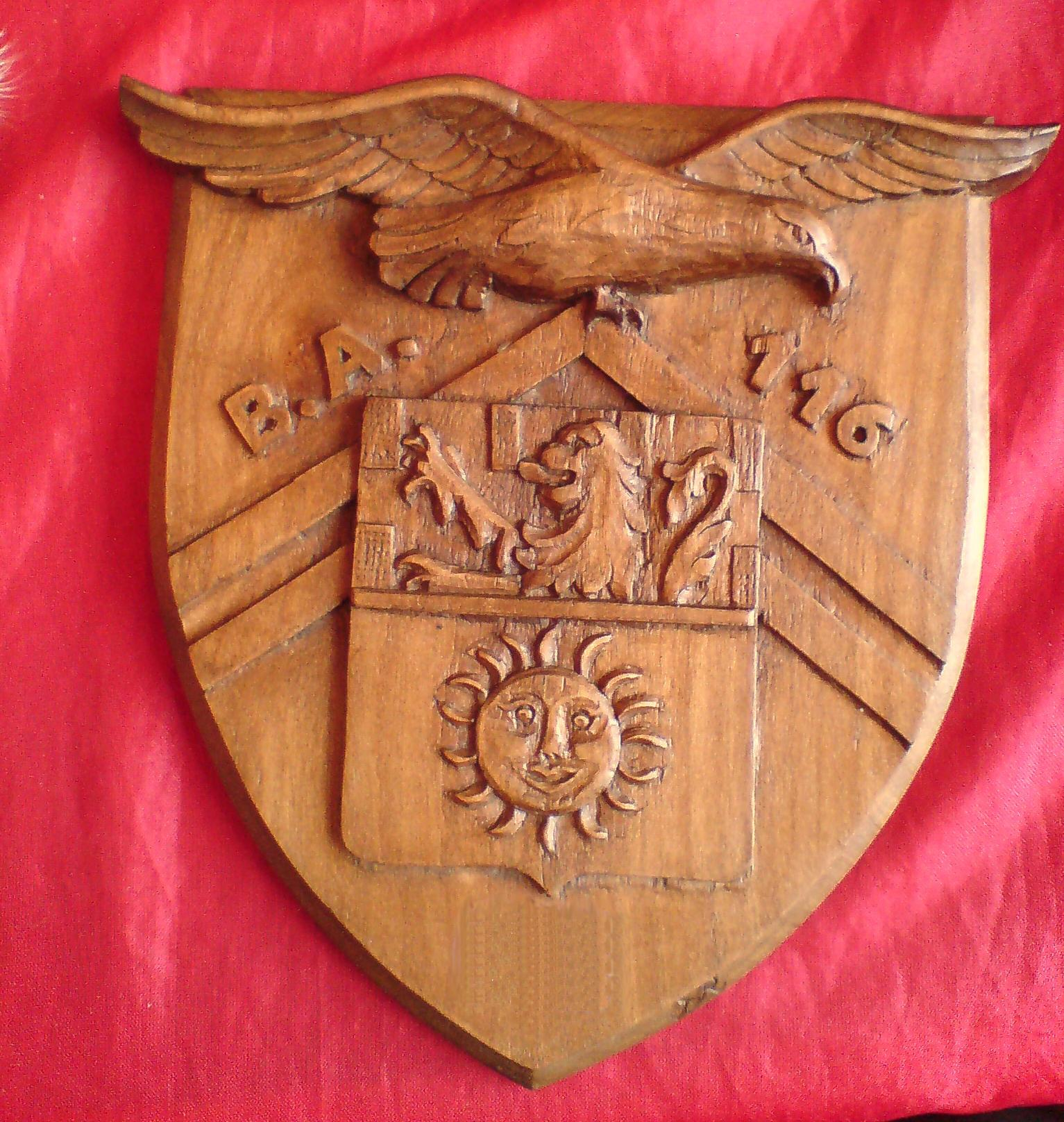
- IATA: none; ICAO: LFSX

Summary
- Airport type: Military
- Owner: Government of France
- Operator: Armée de l'air et de l'espace
- Location: Luxeuil-les-Bains, Haute-Saône
- Elevation AMSL: 913 ft / 278 m
- Coordinates: 47°46′59″N 006°21′51″E
- Interactive map of Luxeuil - Saint-Sauveur Air Base

Runways
Direction	Length		Surface
Direction	m	ft	Surface
04/22	2,315	7,595	Asphalt
11/29	2,433	7,982	Asphalt

Luxeuil - Saint-Sauveur (French: Base aérienne 116 Luxeuil Saint-Sauveur or BA 116) (ICAO: LFSX) is a medium size French Air and Space Force (Armée de l'air et de l'espace) base located near Luxeuil-les-Bains in the Franche-Comté region of France. It has two runways: 113/293 with a length of 2433m, and 038/218 with a length of 2315m.

== Overview ==
The base is used exclusively by the Armée de l'air et de l'espace:

- Escadron de Chasse 1/2 Cigognes (Mirage 2000-5F)

The two units are supported by:

- DAMS (Dépôt atelier munitions spécialisées), Specialised Ammunition Storage, responsible for the nuclear strike alert facilities on the base.
- Tactical Instruction Centre 00.339 Aquitaine, in charge of directing the strike squadrons in their low-altitude all-weather mission.
- Air Defence squadron 04.950 Servance, responsible for anti aircraft defence.
- Fusiliers Commandos de l'Air, responsible for security and ground defence.

== History ==
The airfield was created for the French Aeronautique Militaire in early 1916, on military grounds. On 18 April, the "Escadrille américaine" n° 124 was formed under captain Georges Thenault's command, later to become Escadrille "La Fayette".

The Air Service, United States Army first set up a V Corps Infantry Liaison School in mid-1918, for which 99th Aero Squadron flew training missions from 1 July until 7 September 1918, before it joined V Corps Observation Group on Souilly Aerodrome; during its Luxeuil's time, the squadron dispatched its 3rd Flight to French 33rd Corps Aviation, flying from Corcieux airfield 19–24 July, and from Dogneville airfield 27 July - 28 August.

V Corps Observation Group was formed on 1 September 1918 in Luxeuil, but formally organized at Souilly Aerodrome on 7 September. 104th Aero Squadron had been flying from Luxeuil for the American V Corps since 8 August when it joined the newly formed group and followed its HQ to Souilly Aerodrome.

From 19 September 1918, 258th Aero Squadron (VII Corps Observation Group) flew missions from Luxeuil Aerodrome; one Flight moved to Bourguignon airfield, near Sochaux, before the whole squadron moved in on 7 November.

All those units flew tactical reconnaissance missions for the benefit of Army Corps, flying over the battlefield, reporting enemy troop movements as well as taking aerial photography and written observation of the area; artillery adjustments would also be made from the air.

The airfield was also used by the French Aeronautique Militaire as a depot, until late 1919. From then on, it saw almost continuous activity until today, still being one of the main French Air Force airbases.

Luxeuil was a previous nuclear-capable base, before that mission was removed in 2011. 40 Rafale F5 jets with ASN4G nuclear missiles will be stationed at this air base.
