= 99th Aero Squadron =

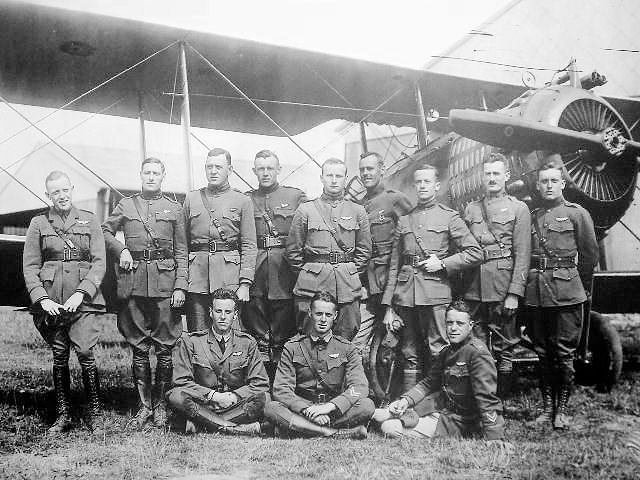
- Pilots and observers of the 99th Aero Squadron pose with a Salmson 2A2 at Dogneville Airdrome, France, July 1918.
- Active: 21 August 1917 – 2 June 1919
- Country: United States
- Branch: Air Service, United States Army
- Type: Squadron
- Role: Corps Observation
- Part of: American Expeditionary Forces (AEF)
- Engagements: World War I

Commanders
- Notable commanders: Maj. Arthur R. Christie; Capt. James E. Meredith; Capt. Lyle S. Powell

Insignia
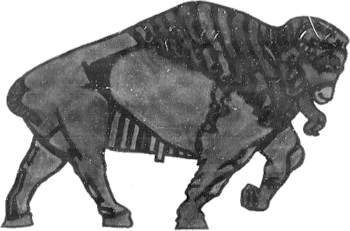
- 99th Aero Squadron Emblem

Aircraft flown
- Fighter: Sopwith 1½ Strutter, 1918
- Reconnaissance: Salmson 2A2, 1918–1919

Service record
- Operations: V Corps Observation Group; Western Front, France: 12 June-11 November 1918: Sorties: 417; Combat missions: 279; Killed: 3; Wounded: 5; Missing: 1; Aircraft lost: 5
- Victories: Enemy Aircraft shot down: 3; Enemy Balloons shot down: 0; Total Enemy Aircraft Destroyed: 3

The 99th Aero Squadron was an Air Service, United States Army unit that fought on the Western Front during World War I.

The squadron was assigned as a Corps Observation Squadron, performing short-range, tactical reconnaissance over the V Corps, United States First Army sector of the Western Front in France, providing battlefield intelligence. After the 1918 Armistice with Germany, the squadron returned to the United States in June 1919 and became part of the permanent United States Army Air Service in 1921, being re-designated as the 99 Squadron (Observation).

The 99th Reconnaissance Squadron of the twenty-first century's United States Air Force, assigned to the 9th Operations Group, Beale Air Force Base, California, traces its descent from the 99th Aero Squadron.

== History ==
=== Origins ===
The 99th Aero Squadron was organized on 21 August 1917 at Kelly Field, Texas. On 13 October 1917 the squadron was ordered to the Aviation Concentration Center, Mineola, Long Island, New York, for overseas duty.

The squadron traveled by train from San Antonio to New York City. The 99th embarked for France at Hoboken, New Jersey, on the White Star liner RMS Cedric on 14 November. The liner crossed the Atlantic via Halifax, Nova Scotia, and arrived in Liverpool, England, on 30 November. From Liverpool, the squadron took a train south to Winchester, where it remained until 7 December at a rest camp. On 8 December, the squadron crossed the English Channel, arriving in Le Havre, France. After two days awaiting transportation, the squadron boarded a troop train and arrived at American Expeditionary Forces 2d Aviation Instruction Center at Tours Aerodrome, France.

The 99th was the first complete American aero squadron to arrive at the 2d Aviation Instruction Center. Men were assigned to special duty in various training departments. The instruction concentrated on becoming familiar with the British and French aircraft and various engines they were expected to deal with at the front.

The squadron, now composed of three officers and 136 enlisted men, left Tours on 9 March and arrived on 11 March at Haussimont Aerodrome, in the "Zone of Advance", or the Western Front. The squadron was designated as a corps observation squadron, and assigned to the Headquarters, Chief of Air Service, AEF. Hangars were erected at the field in preparation for reception of airplanes and pilots. On 23 March 18 pilots were assigned to the squadron and an equal number of British Sopwith 1½ Strutter aircraft. At Haussimont, the squadron organization grew to include armament, engineering, radio, photographic, and other departments. With the arrival of observers, the squadron was ready to enter combat as a completely equipped American observation squadron.

=== Combat in France ===
The initial operations of the squadron began on 1 April with missions being flown in conjunction with the 3d Artillery Observation School at Mailly, France, as part of the First Army Observation Group. This work continued daily until 31 May, when orders were received to move to Amanty Aerodrome. On 20 June, the first casualty of a flying officer occurred, while testing an aircraft at the French airdrome at Epiez, a 99th pilot was killed in a crash.

The first flight across the lines into enemy territory occurred on 22 June 1918 when Lieutenants Alexander, Kahle, and Nutt, along with three observers, flew over the enemy lines on a reconnaissance mission over the Toul-Moselle Sector. All of the aircraft returned with holes in the wings, attesting to the accuracy of enemy anti-aircraft artillery.

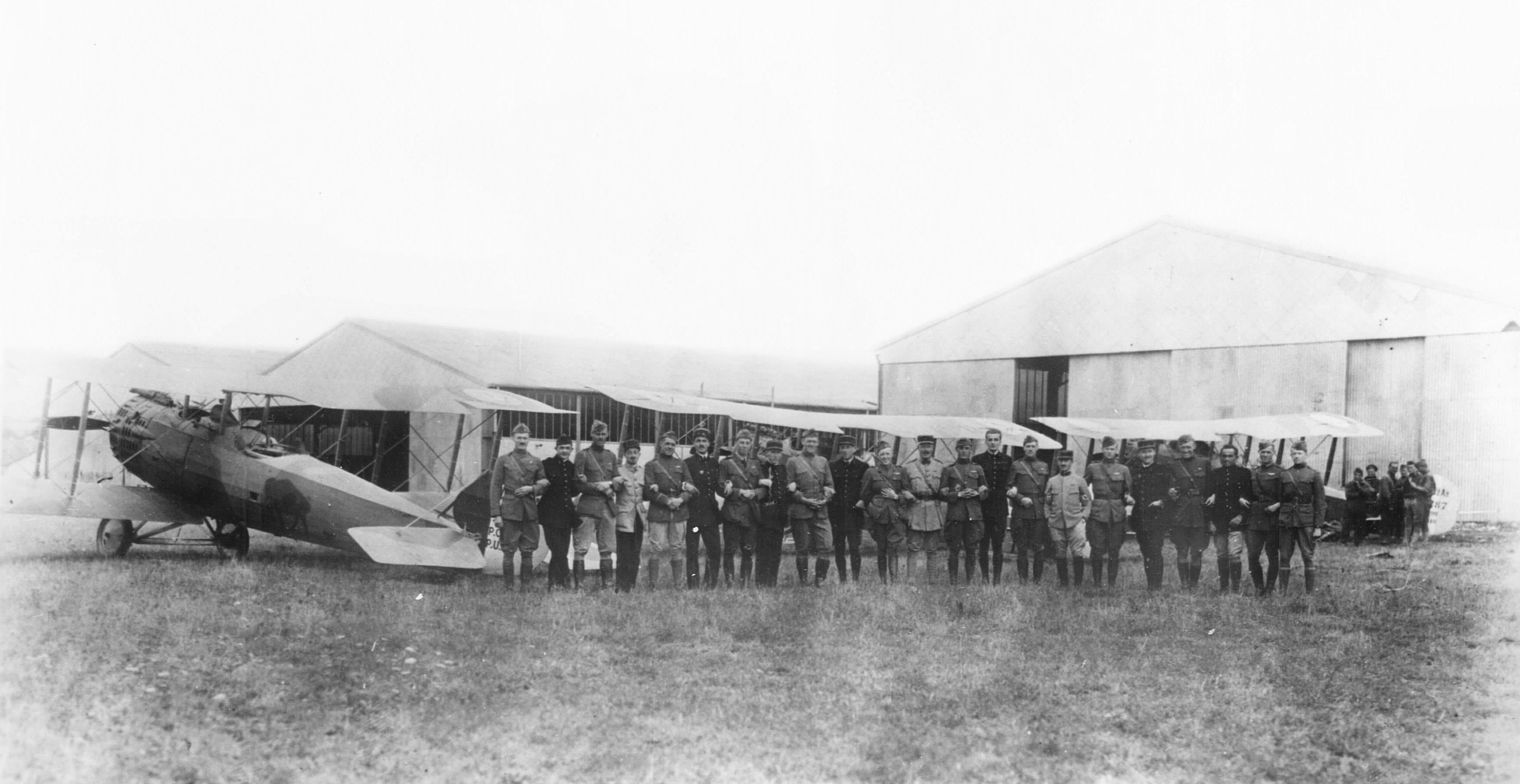
Officers of the 3d flight, 99th Aero Squadron with offierc of the Escadrille Sal No. 1 (French) at Dogneville Airdrome, France, August 1918.

Missions in the Toul Sector were of brief duration and on 1 July, the squadron was ordered to Luxeuil-les-Bains Aerodrome and transferred to the V Corps Observation Group. Being the first American Aero Squadron to arrive at Luxeuil, the squadron was given an unusually cordial reception. There, the squadron received the latest in French observation planes, the Salmson 2A2, as the Sopwiths were found to be unsatisfactory for reconnaissance over enemy territory.

Missions began immediately with the V Corps Infantry Aviation School at Luxeuil. A detachment of flying officers were dispatched to Corcieux Airdrome, Vosges, France for flights over the lines with the French SAL 285 Squadron. The mission of the squadron at Corcieux was to cooperate with the French Air Force and enable the pilots and observers to learn the St. Die Sector. In order to learn the sector, the American Observers flew with French pilots, and French Observers flew with American pilots. In these flights, frequent combat was encountered with German aircraft.

On 24 July the SAL 285 was ordered to move and the 99th's 3d Flight, consisting of seven Salmsons, seven pilots, seven observers and their maintenance crews moved from Luxeuil-les-Bains, to the French Dogneville Airdrome. There, the flight was assigned to the 33rd French Corps, was ordered to carry on the work over the sector formerly covered by the 285th Squadron. The 99th flew reconnaissance missions and directed artillery fire in support of U.S. Army, 5th Division's offensive against German soldiers entrenched at Frapelle.

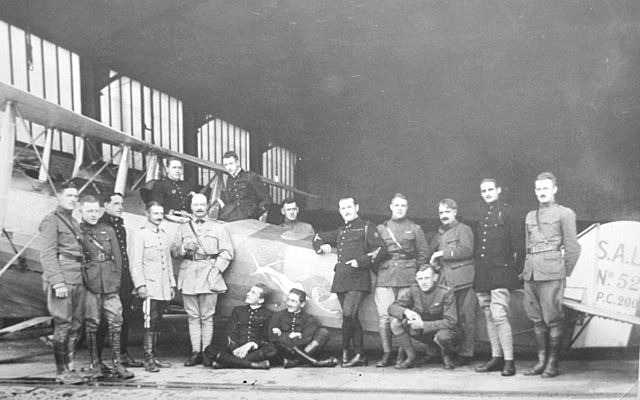
Members of the 99th Aero Squadron and French 1st Escadrille with a French Salmson 2A2, Dogneville Aerodrome, France, August 1918.

From Dogneville, the 3rd Flight flew photographic missions more than 40 kilometers behind enemy lines. No other unit, in this sector, had ever photographed deeper than ten kilometers before. When the 5th Division began its attack on 17 August 1918, the 3rd kept two aircraft airborne throughout the day. One observed enemy positions and directed artillery fire. The other maintained contact with Allied infantry and advised headquarters of the line-of-advance. Since the ground troops never displayed panels to show their position, pilots often had to fly low enough to distinguish between friendly and enemy uniforms. This exposed the aircraft and crew to heavy machine-gun and rifle fire. Contact crews often aided the ground offensive by attacking machine-gun sites and firing at enemy troops. After the successful offensive, 3d Flight crews photographed the new front lines

Observers developed an effective means of communicating their information to the ground commanders. They first radioed the data to their ground station. Pilots then flew over the unit command post and observers dropped a written message confirming the radio call. They next flew over corps headquarters and dropped another note verifying their radio communication. Despite what seemed to be an efficient method, aviators and artillery troops often had difficulty communicating and seldom made an effective team.

The 99th also aided the 5th Corps during the St. Mihiel offensive from 12 through 16 September. The squadron had moved to Souilly Aerodrome on 7 September. German soldiers were well entrenched and prepared for a prolonged defense of their positions. Before the attack, crews flew photographic reconnaissance missions taking oblique shots of enemy positions. As the ground offensive began on 12 September, a heavy mist, low-hanging clouds and intermittent rain severely hampered aerial observation. Nevertheless, 99th pilots flew visual observation and artillery adjustment missions throughout the day.

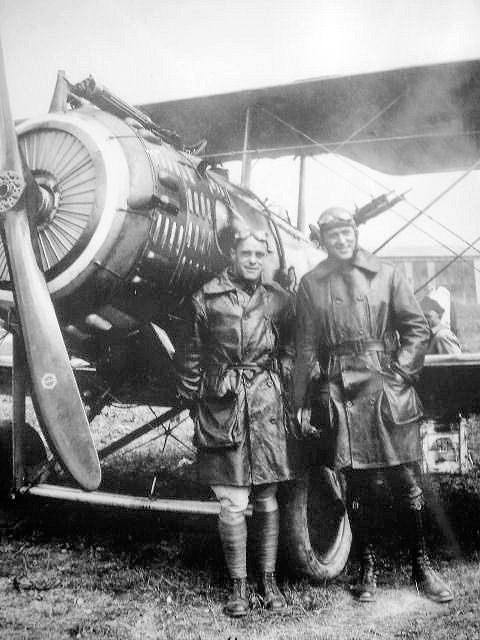
1st Lt. Frank Llewellyn, pilot, and 1st Lt. Roland Neel, observer, with their Salmson 2A2 probably at Dogneville Aerodrome, France, July 1918

Severe weather also affected aerial operations on 13 September, but skies cleared the following day. So the 99th flew infantry contact, artillery adjustment, photographic and visual reconnaissance missions. Flying eight kilometers deep behind enemy lines, crews produced photographs that clearly defined enemy positions. Some of Germany's best aviators operated in this area, but Allied crews successfully defended themselves and completed their mission. On 15 September, foul weather returned and limited flights to visual operations and artillery adjustments.

On 20 September the 99th Aero Squadron moved to Foucaucourt Aerodrome and prepared to help the 5th Corps in the Meuse-Argonne offensive. Again, the German soldiers opposed the attack from barbed-wire-protected trenches. Also, additional enemy pursuit, observation and bombardment forces meant most of the Kaiser's best aviation units defended the area.

When the ground attack began on 26 September, inclement weather restricted flight operations. Rain, haze and fog usually obscured the ground from then until 11 November. Since cloud cover severely limited photographic reconnaissance, headquarters confined missions to a few, well-defined and extremely important areas. Aircraft and pilots often stood ready to fly, waiting in vain for any break in the clouds. When weather permitted, crews took oblique photographs along enemy lines. If the need for information was great, pilots flew even in heavy cloud cover hoping for a chance break to take that important picture.

Pursuit planes protected observation aircraft during these missions. The large number of enemy pursuit aircraft operating in the area made an attack during photographic flights almost a certainty. The pursuit protectors often flew about 500 meters above the observation aircraft. This gave them an advantage against enemy attackers. Photographic aircraft also flew during large bombing and pursuit operations to take advantage of the amassed firepower. The four black crosses on the 9th Reconnaissance Wing's emblem today represent 1st and 99th Squadrons' participation at St. Mihiel, Argonne-Meuse, Champagne-Marne and Aisne-Marne.

=== Demobilization ===
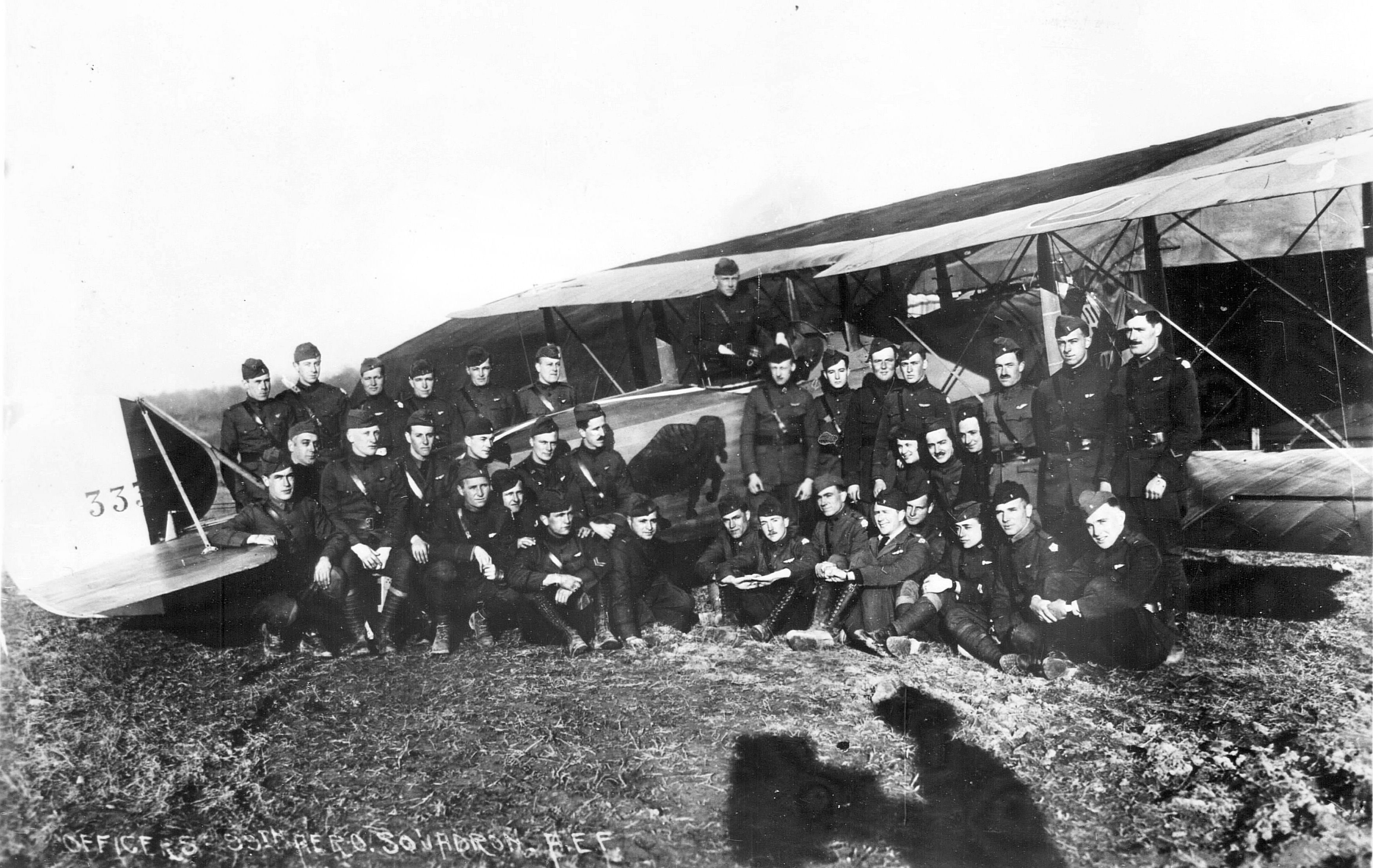
Men of the 99th Aero Squadron with their Salmson 2A2 at Parois Airdrome, France, November 1918

With the Armistice with Germany reached on 11 November 1918, combat operations ended. After nearly three months of service on the front, the 99th Aero Squadron lost 3 members Killed in Action, and another 5 members killed from wounds or other causes. Six other members were wounded. One aircraft, a Salmson, did not return from a mission on 29 September, its pilot and observer were not accounted for and were carried as Missing In Action. Both members were later determined to be KIA and their bodies were recovered.

With the end of combat, the 99th was transferred to Air Service Headquarters, AEF, moving to Belrain Aerodrome on 31 November, then to Chaumont Hill 402 on 13 December. With the sudden end of the war, the process of returning the AEF to the United States took several months. Squadron pilots began flying courier and liaison flights within the American sector, while flights of the squadron were dispatched to several airfields to support the French Air Force in reconstruction and other necessary tasks.

On 19 February 1919 orders were received for the squadron to report to the 1st Air Depot, Colombey-les-Belles Airdrome to turn in all of its supplies and equipment and was relieved from duty with the AEF. The squadron's Salmson aircraft were delivered to the Air Service American Air Service Acceptance Park No. 1 at Orly Aerodrome to be returned to the French. There practically all of the pilots and observers were detached from the squadron.

Personnel at Colombey were subsequently assigned to the commanding general, services of supply, and ordered to report to a staging camp at Sadirac. There, personnel awaited scheduling to report to one of the base ports in France for transport to the United States and subsequent demobilization. In early May, the 99th was moved to the Base Port at Bordeaux, and the squadron arrived in New York about the 23d and began the process of demobilization at Hazelhurst Field on Long Island. By the middle of June, the 99th Aero Squadron was fully demobilized, its men returned to civilian life.

=== Lineage ===
- Organized as 99th Aero Squadron on 21 August 1917

Re-designated as 99th Aero Squadron (Corps Observation) on 11 March 1918
Re-designated as 99th Aero Squadron on 24 May 1919
Demobilized on 9 June 1919
Re-constituted and organized as 99th Corps Observation Squadron on 2 July 1919
Re-designated: 99th Squadron (Observation) on 14 March 1921

=== Assignments ===
- Post Headquarters, Kelly Field, 21 August 1917
- Aviation Concentration Center, 3 November 1917
- 2d Aviation Instruction Center, 12 December 1917
- Headquarters, Chief of Air Service, AEF, 11 March 1918

Attached to 3d Artillery Observation School, c. 1 Apr – 31 May 1918

- V Corps Observation Group, 7 September 1918
- 1st Air Depot, AEF, 19 February 1919
- Commanding General, Services of Supply, 5 March 1919
- Post Headquarters, Mitchell Field, 24 May 1919
- Eastern Department, 25 May – 9 June 1919; 2 July 1919
- Third Corps Area, 20 August 1920

=== Stations ===
- Kelly Field, Texas, 21 August 1917
- Aviation Concentration Center, Garden City, New York, 3 November 1917
- Port of Entry, Hoboken, New Jersey

Overseas transport: RMS Cedric, 14–30 November 1917

- Tours Aerodrome, France, 12 December 1917
- Haussimont Aerodrome, France, 11 March 1918
- Amanty Aerodrome, France, 31 May 1918
- Luxeuil-les-Bains Aerodrome, France, 1 July 1918

Flight operated from Corcieux Aerodrome, 19–24 July 1918
Flight operated from Dogneville Aerodrome, 24 July – 26 August 1918

- Souilly Aerodrome, France, 7 September 1918
- Foucaucourt Aerodrome, France, 20 September 1918
- Parois Aerodrome, France, 4 November 1918
- Belrain Aerodrome, France, 31 November 1918
- Chaumont Hill 402, France, 13 December 1918

Flights operated from Prauthoy Aerodrome, Bourbonne-les-Bains Aerodrome, and Montigny-le-Roi Aerodrome, France, until c. 1 February 1919

- Colombey-les-Belles Airdrome, France, 19 February 1919
- Sadirac, France, 5 March-8 May 1919
- Mitchel Field, New York, 24 May 1919
- Hazelhurst Field, New York, 25 May – 9 June 1919
- Mitchel Field, New York, 2 July 1919
- Camp Alfred Vail, New Jersey, July 1919
- Bolling Field, DC, 17 August 1919

=== Combat sectors and campaigns ===
Streamer	Sector/Campaign	Dates	Notes
	Toul Sector	22 June – 1 July 1918	
	St. Die Sector	19 July – 26 August 1918	
	St. Mihiel Offensive Campaign	12–16 September 1918	
	Meuse-Argonne Offensive Campaign	26 September – 11 November 1918	

=== Notable personnel ===
- Lt. Stirling C. Alexander, DSC, 1 aerial victory
- Lt. Benjamin L. Atwater, DSC, 1 aerial victory
- Lt. Edgar R. Case, SSC
- Lt. John R. Castleman, DSC, SSC, 2 aerial victories
- Lt. Joseph E. Eaton, SSC
- Lt. Jefferson Hayes-Davis, SSC

Note: Grandson of Jefferson Davis, President of the Confederate States of America.

- Lt. Raymond C. Hill, DSC, (KIA)
- Lt. Clarence C. Kahle, DSC, (KIA)
- Capt. Frank A. Llewellyn, DSC
- Lt. Roland H. Neel, DSC
- Lt. William O. Nickel, SSC
- Lt. Britton Polley, DSC, SSC
- Lt. Glen A. Preston, DSC (3x), 2 aerial victories
- Lt. Albert G. Simpson, SSC

DSC: Distinguished Service Cross; SSC: Silver Star Citation; KIA: Killed in Action

== See also ==
- List of American aero squadrons
- Organization of the Air Service of the American Expeditionary Force
