= Souilly Aerodrome =

World War I airfield near Souilly, France

- Part of American Expeditionary Forces (AEF)
- Located near: Souilly, France
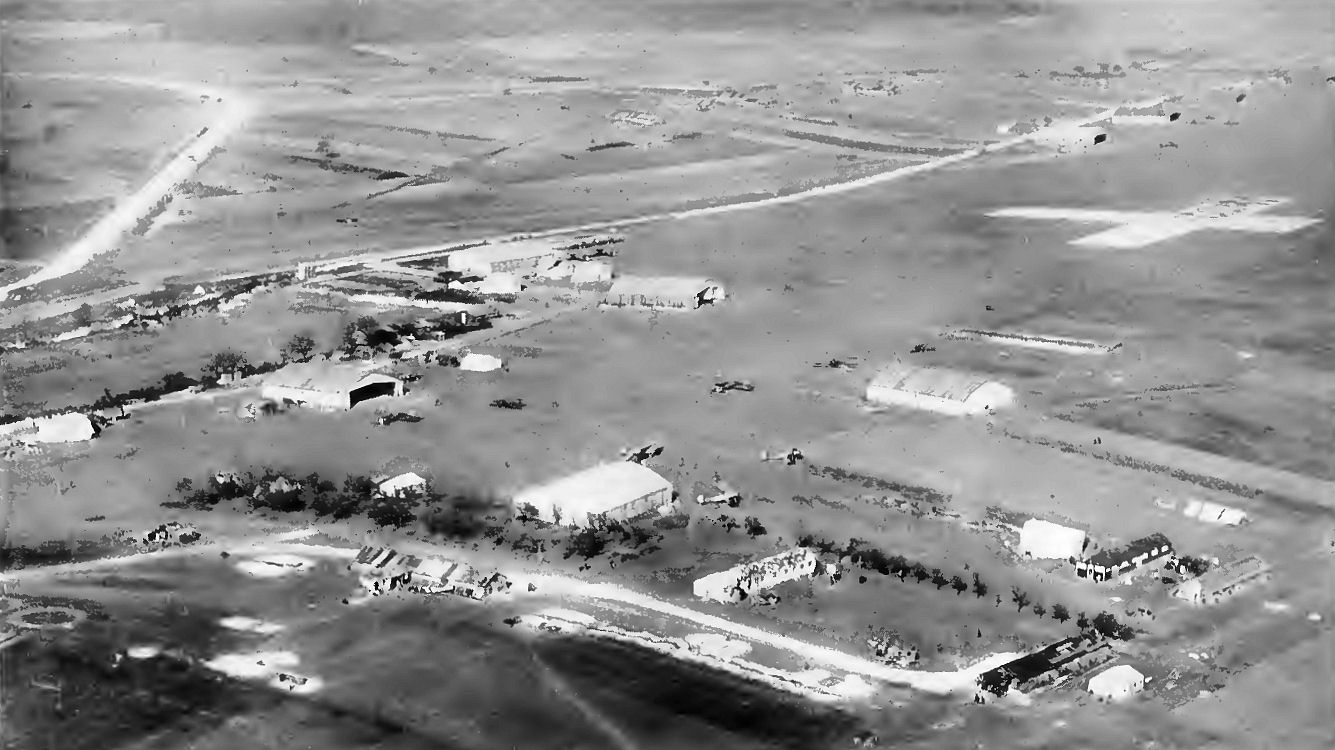
- Souilly Aerodrome, France, 1918

Site information
- Type: Combat Airfield
- Controlled by: Air Service, United States Army
- Condition: Agricultural area

Location
- Coordinates: 49°02′06″N 005°17′45″E

Site history
- Built: 1918
- In use: 1918–1919
- Battles/wars: World War I

Garrison information
- Garrison: V Corps Observation Group; III Corps Observation Group; United States First Army Air Service

Souilly Aerodrome was a temporary World War I airfield in France, used by the French Air Service, and by the Air Service, United States Army. It was located 10 miles (16 km) south-southwest of Verdun, in the Meuse department in north-eastern France.

== Overview ==
With the Battle of Verdun raging on in the early part of 1917, a cluster of new airfields were built for the benefit on the French Air Service north of Souilly, sheltered by the forest of Souilly, such as Souilly, Lemmes or Julvécourt, which were to be used in 1918 by the American Air Service.

Early in September 1918, a detachment of 484th Aero Squadron (Construct.) arrived on the airfield to make some improvements, as a French fighter "escadrille" - SPA 23 - was still flying from Souilly for the benefit of the American First Army. V Corps Observation Group arrived on 7 September, with HQ, 99th Aero Squadron and 104th Aero Squadron, but it soon left for the Foucaucourt Aerodrome, on 20 September, flying observation/reconnaissance missions for the United States First Army.

88th Aero Squadron showed up 12–14 September, flying missions for the American III Army Corps, and it came back on 20 September as part of the newly formed III Corps Observation Group, together with 90th Aero Squadron and the Group's HQ.

During the Meuse-Argonne Offensive, the men at Souilly worked night and day directing the operations, coordinating the work, and suggesting and sending out missions carried out by the squadrons, which returned with valuable and complete information. The progress of the attack was followed the line taken at intervals during each day of the attack. Many of the planes were damaged during the attack due to enemy fire and the engines were constantly overworked.

By October 1918, Souilly Aerodrome had become one of the major American airfields near Verdun, and it saw units from the First Army Observation Group flying from Souilly, such as a detachment of 91st Aero Squadron for a few days from 16 October, and 186th Aero Squadron, which arrived on 29 October and stayed until 15 April 1919 when it became part of the Rhineland occupation forces.

Just before the Armistice was signed, the four squadrons which formed the 2d Pursuit Group landed at Souilly, while the Group's HQ stayed at Belrain Aerodrome. The Group was finally disbanded on 11 December, while its squadrons progressively left Souilly, eventually to reach Colombey les Belles Air Depot in early 1919, where they left their aircraft before sailing back to the United States.

As most of the others airfields, Souilly was returned to agricultural use. Today it is a series of cultivated fields located northeast of Souilly, on the east side of D 159, with no indications of its wartime use, although the remains of primitive concrete cross-shaped runways probably built in 1918, as shown on the above picture, were still visible as late as 1970.

== Known units assigned ==
- Headquarters, V Corps Observation Group, 7–20 September 1918
- 88th Aero Squadron (Observation) 12–14 September 1918; 20 September – 4 November 1918
- 99th Aero Squadron (Observation) 7–20 September 1918
- 104th Aero Squadron (Observation) 8–20 September 1918
- Headquarters, III Corps Observation Group, 20 September – 29 October 1918
- 13th Aero Squadron (Pursuit) 23 September – 16 December 1918
- 49th Aero Squadron (Pursuit) 7 November 1918 – 7 December 1919
- 22d Aero Squadron (Pursuit) 7 November 1918 – 29 January 1919
- Detachment of 24th Aero Squadron (Observation), 9–18 Oct 1918, 27 Oct – 6 Nov 1918
- Detachment of 91st Aero Squadron (Observation), 16 Oct – Nov 1918
- 186th Aero Squadron (Observation), 29 Oct 1918 – 15 April 1919

== See also ==
- List of Air Service American Expeditionary Force aerodromes in France
