= V Corps Observation Group =

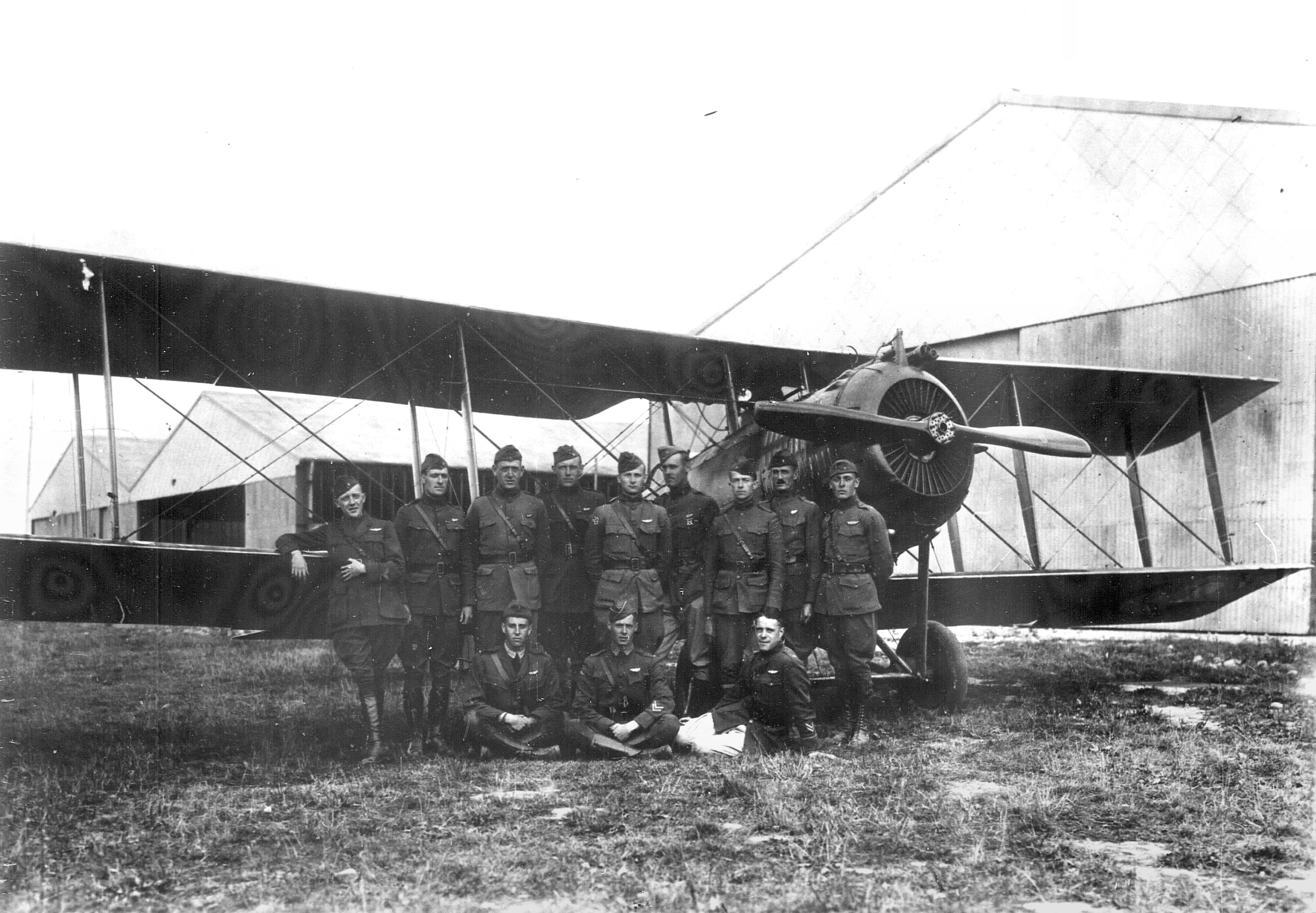
- Pilots of the 99th Aero Squadron with a Salmson 2.A2, Parois Airdrome, France, November, 1918
- Active: 7 August – 15 February 1919
- Country: United States
- Branch: Air Service, United States Army
- Type: Group
- Role: Command and Control
- Part of: American Expeditionary Forces (AEF)
- Engagements: World War I: Champagne-Mame Defensive Campaign; Aisne-Mame Offensive Campaign; St. Mihiel Offensive Campaign; Meuse-Argonne Offensive Campaign

Insignia
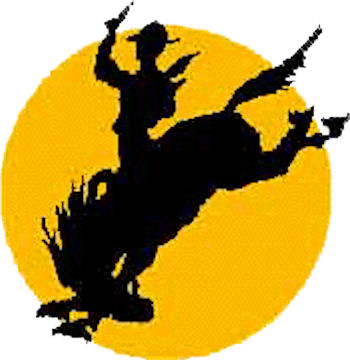
- 88th Aero Squadron Emblem

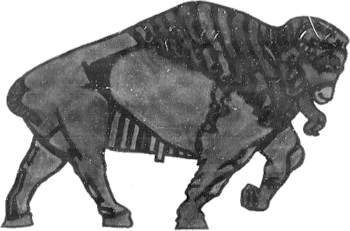
- 99th Aero Squadron Emblem

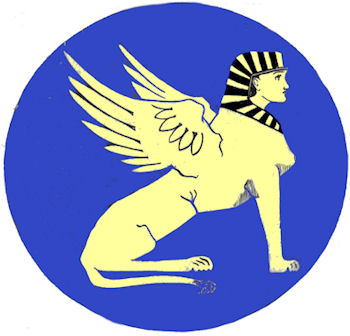
- 104th Aero Squadron Emblem

The V Corps Observation Group was an Air Service, United States Army unit that fought on the Western Front during World War I as part of the Air Service, First United States Army. It was demobilized in France on 15 February 1919. There is no modern United States Air Force unit that shares its lineage and history.

== Mission ==
The mission of the group was primarily to keep the friendly command informed of the general situation within the enemy lines by means of visual and photographic reconnaissances. It was called upon to effect, whenever necessary, the adjustment of U.S. Army artillery fire. In addition, it was expected that the group would serve to complete the schooling of pilots and observers and render them more competent to undertake intensive operations elsewhere on a larger and more complete scale.

== History ==
Created on 1 August 1918, it was organized at Luxeuil-les-Bains Aerodrome, France with the 99th and 104th Aero Squadrons on 7 August. At the time of organization, the 99th was conducting a liaison school with infantry units at which place the 104th Squadron reported, but due to a lack of equipment and officer personnel, no combat operations took place.

On 7 September the group moved to Souilly Aerodrome in preparation for the St. Mihiel Offensive. At Souilly, the 88th Aero Squadron was assigned on 15 September. Again moved to Foucaucourt Aerodrome on 20 September in preparation for the Meuse-Argonne offensive. In addition, the 1st Air Park was assigned to the Group for repair work and transportation support.

During the period 20 October – 1 November, the weather conditions were very poor. Observation patrols over the enemy lines were very difficult due to the poor visibility, and direct observation yielded very little useful information. Clearing weather on 2 November, extensive observation flights weer made of enemy positions, artillery locations, and enemy defensive organization in general.

=== Lineage ===
- Organized in France as: V Corps Observation Group, 7 August 1918

Demobilized in France on 15 February 1919

=== Assignments ===
- First Army Air Service, 1 September 1918 – 15 February 1919

=== Components ===
- 88th Aero Squadron (Corps Observation), 12–17 September 1918 (Attached)
- 99th Aero Squadron (Corps Observation), 7 August 1918 – 15 February 1919
- 104th Aero Squadron (Corps Observation), 4 August 1918 - 19 December 1918
- Escadrilles BR 219 & BR 229 Escadrille, Aéronautique Militaire (Attached)

=== Stations ===
- Luxeuil-les-Bains Aerodrome, France, 7 August 1918
- Souilly Aerodrome, France, 7 September 1918
- Foucaucourt Aerodrome, France, 20 September 1918
- Parois Airdrome, France, 4–15 February 1919

== See also ==
- Organization of the Air Service of the American Expeditionary Force
