= 91st Aero Squadron =

United States Army Air Service unit in World War I

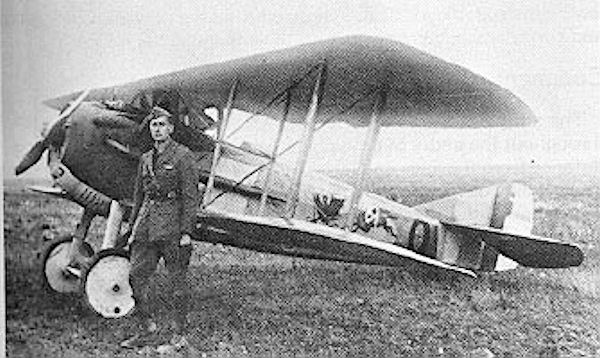
- Lt. Everett Richard Cook, Commanding Officer, 91st Aero Squadron, standing beside his Spad VIII aircraft, 1918
- Active: 21 August 1917–Present
- Country: United States
- Branch: Air Service, United States Army
- Role: Observation
- Size: Squadron
- Part of: American Expeditionary Forces (AEF)
- Engagements: World War I Occupation of the Rhineland

- Decorations: French Croix de Guerre with Palm

Commanders
- Notable commanders: Maj. John N. Reynolds; Lt. Everett R. Cook

Insignia
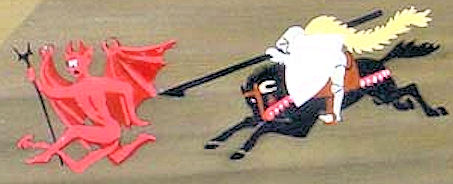
- 91st Aero Squadron emblem

Aircraft flown
- Fighter: Spad XIII, 1918–1919
- Reconnaissance: Avion de Reconnaissance 1 and 2 (AR 1 AR 2), 1918; Breguet 14, 1918–1919; Salmson 2A2 1918–1919; De Havilland DH-4, 1918–1919
- Trainer: Curtiss JN-4, 1917

Service record
- Operations: First Army Observation Group; Western Front, France: 7 May-11 November 1918: Sorties flown: 682; Combat missions: 303; Enemy combats: 104; Killed: 3 Pilots, 2 Observers; Wounded: 3 Pilots, 4 Observers; Missing: 6 Pilots, 5 Observers; Aircraft lost: 8, 7 missing
- Victories: Enemy Aircraft shot down: 21; Enemy Balloons shot down: 0; Total Enemy Aircraft Destroyed: 21; Air Aces: 4: Lt. William T. Badham, 5, (all shared)*; Capt. Everett R. Cook, 5, (all shared)**; Capt. Leonard C. Hammond, 6 (all shared)*; Maj. Victor H. Strahm, 5 (all shared)**; *Flew as observer/gunner **Pilot, shared victories with observer/gunner

The 91st Aero Squadron was a unit of the Air Service, United States Army that fought on the Western Front during World War I. The 91st was one of the first five American flying squadrons to reach France, arriving at Chaumont Hill 402 Aerodrome on 15 November 1917.

The squadron was assigned as an Army Observation Squadron, performing long-range, strategic reconnaissance over the entire length of the United States First Army sector of the Western Front in France. After the 1918 Armistice with Germany, the squadron was assigned to the United States Third Army as part of the Occupation of the Rhineland in Germany. It returned to the United States in June 1919 and became part of the permanent United States Army Air Service in 1921, being re-designated as the 91st Squadron.

The current United States Air Force unit which holds its lineage and history is the 91st Cyberspace Operations Squadron, assigned to the 67th Cyberspace Wing, Kelly Field Annex, Lackland Air Force Base, Texas.

== History ==
=== Origins ===
The squadron was formed on 21 August 1917 at Kelly Field, Texas, composed of detachments from Fort Sill, Oklahoma, Fort Leavenworth, Kansas, Jefferson Barracks, Missouri, and Fort Sam Houston, Texas. The squadron, after basic flight training at Kelly Field in Curtiss JN-4 "Jenny" trainers, left for the Aviation Concentration Center at Camp Mills, Garden City, New York, on 30 September. Arriving on 5 October, the squadron spent several uneventful weeks waiting for overseas transport.

On 27 October the squadron boarded the British White Star Liner RMS Adriatic, and sailed for England. At Halifax, Nova Scotia, the ship joined a convoy of seven other ships and made the trans-Atlantic crossing to Liverpool, England, where the squadron arrived on 10 November. The squadron then boarded a train and headed to the Romney Rest Camp in Winchester, arriving that evening. On the 13th, the unit boarded HMS Hunscraft at Southampton Docks and made the cross-channel trip to Le Havre, France, and at 21:30 on the 15th, arrived at the Headquarters Air Service, Zone of Advance at Chaumont Hill 402 Aerodrome. The 91st was one of the first five American flying squadrons to arrive in France. They spent about a month at Chaumont, where the squadron was engaged in construction activity at the base until receiving orders on 13 December for a move to Amanty Airdrome, where the 91st was assigned as an Observation squadron with the First Army Observation Group.

After two months of advanced combat training at Issoudun Aerodrome, the pilots of the 91st squadron arrived on 13 February 1918, and the squadron was equipped with obsolete French Avion de Reconnaissance 1 and 2 (AR 1 AR 2) aircraft. However, the ARs were not considered combat capable and also had unreliable engines. The missions of the 91st largely consisted of taking up observers of the group for instruction purposes, and pilots were sent in groups to the French Aerial Gunnery School at Cazaux Airdrome, near Bordeaux. On 22 March, Lt George Kenney was injured in a non-combat aircraft accident.

=== Combat in France ===
Finally in late April, word was received that the squadron was being re-equipped with the latest in French observation aircraft, the Salmson 2A2, the first of which arrived from Orly Airport, Paris, on 21 April. Aircraft was received for the next month, and on 24 May, the squadron was moved to the Gondreville-sur-Moselle Aerodrome for combat duty. However, problems with the propellers forced another delay and it was not until 3 June that the first combat flight of the 91st Aero Squadron was made over the lines.

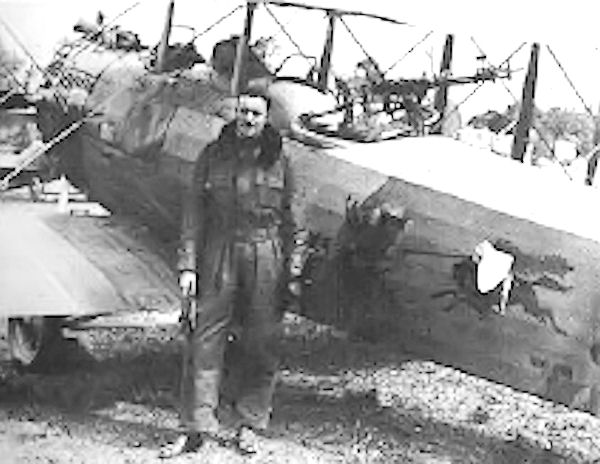
Major John Reynolds, commander of the 91st Aero Squadron, standing next to his Salmson 2A2 with the Squadron Emblem painted on the side of his aircraft, Gondreville-sur-Moselle Aerodrome, France, 1918

In combat, the mission of the 91st was general surveillance of the enemy rear areas by means of both visual and photographic reconnaissance. These missions were carried out for the purpose of intelligence-gathering and informing First Army headquarters informed of enemy movements and preparations for attacks or retreats of its infantry forces. The 91st identified enemy activity along roads and railroads, ground stations, various storage dumps and airfields; the numbers of fires and activities of enemy aircraft, and the amount of anti-aircraft artillery was also monitored and reported. Due to the nature of the missions and the depths of enemy area which was penetrated, the missions were carried out at high altitudes, usually between 4,500 and 5,500 meters.

The first combat losses occurred on 12 June 1918 when Lieutenants Miles and Schilling were on a combat overflight about 15 kilometres (9.3 mi) behind enemy lines, and did not return. On 30 June news was received that both airmen were prisoners, unharmed after their aircraft was attacked and disabled, being forced to land behind enemy lines. On 25 June, Lt Cook was performing a visual reconnaissance mission and just before crossing the lines, a French Nieuport 28 was seen approaching his aircraft. Suddenly, Lt Cooks's plane was fired on by the Nieuport and then he returned fire. The intruder withdrew and Cook continued on his mission. An investigation revealed that the Nieuport pilot had never before seen a Salmson and thought it was an enemy aircraft.

During late June, the squadron was engaged in intense combat flying in support of the Battle of Château-Thierry, taking photos of practically the entire sector. This work took place without any protective support from accompanying pursuit aircraft. Air Combat was common on every mission over enemy lines. On 4 July, an otherwise routine combat day, a group of people from the village of Gondreville came to the Airdrome and filled the mess hall with pastry, nuts and champagne, to help the Americans celebrate Independence Day.

On 12 August Major John N. Reynolds, squadron commander, led a formation of squadron aircraft to try out a new idea that had been suggested. His aircraft was carrying bombs, and over Thiaucourt-Regniéville, he attacked several enemy targets and three bombs registered direct hits. On the way back to Gondreville, four German Pfalz D.VIII scout aircraft attacked the formation, and the squadron lost one observer, Lt Baker was mortally wounded. Although taken to a hospital upon landing, he died of his wounds on the 15th. During the remainder of August, good flying weather kept the squadron quite busy, and by the end of the month, practically every square foot of the sector had been photographed. Aerial combat was engaged in nearly every mission, however no German enemy aircraft were shot down. The 91st was reinforced with additional pilots and observers in preparation for a rumored offensive at St Mihiel. An additional squadron, the 24th, moved into Gondreville on 23 August, and underwent training in the Salmson 2A2.

September 1918 was an exceptionally heavy combat month. On the 2d, during a photographic mission over Metz, squadron aircraft ran into a large formation of enemy aircraft and engaged in continuous combat which lasted all the way back to the lines. The 91st brought down three enemy aircraft, however they were not confirmed as they fell too far back behind the lines to be observed. None of the squadrons' planes were lost or badly damaged. On the 4th the squadron was also attacked by enemy aircraft, when three enemy aircraft attacked the formation. In an attempt to escape, Lt Foster went into a dive with the enemy on his tail. Lt Hughey followed the German down, and after firing a few bursts of his front machine gun, he set the German aircraft on fire. Hughey then dove on another German aircraft and this one, too, went down in flames. The third then broke off the attack and headed towards home, however Lt Foster's aircraft was badly damaged and he went into a spiral, however he was able to land in enemy territory and was taken prisoner, unhurt. On 7 September 1918 Lts A. W. Lawson {pilot} and H. W. Verwohlt {observer} were shot down and captured near Conflans {Verwodlt was wounded in the leg, which had to be amputated on 11 November 1918}

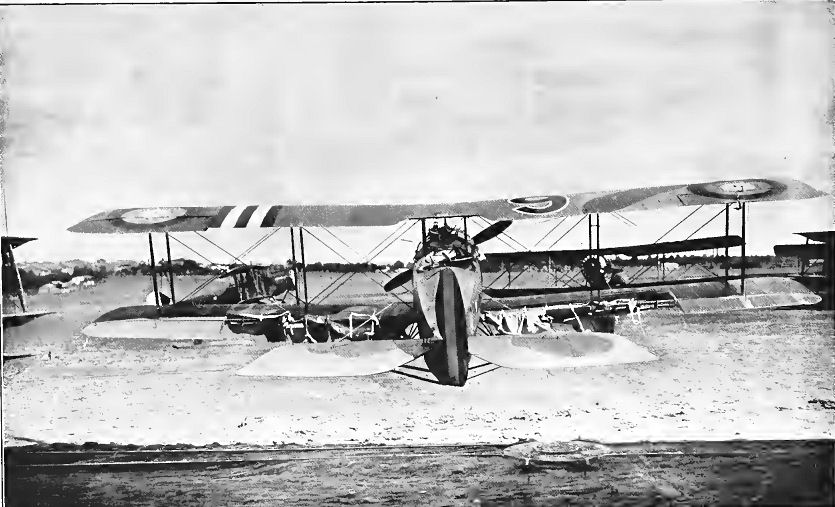
Salmson 2A2 aircraft of the 91st Aero Squadron damaged by antiaircraft fire. Note the tattered underside of the wing fabric

On 11 September news was received that the first All-American offensive was to start the next morning with a large artillery bombardment, followed by an infantry advance to wipe out the St. Mihiel salient. All night long the noise of the massive artillery bombardment could be heard. However, flying weather could hardly have been worse. Although the squadron flew combat missions during the attack, the missions had to be carried out at low altitudes between 50 and 100m altitude due to the driving rain in order to get the necessary intelligence to support the infantry advance. Flights were flown in darkness, searching for enemy troop concentrations and artillery batteries, returning to Gondreville by the aid of flares at night. Due to the hazardous weather, it was almost impossible to keep formations together, but missions were accomplished. On the 13th, Lieutenants Diskman and Hammond were attacked by enemy aircraft at an altitude of 200m just south of Metz. About 75 rounds from a pair of Lewis machine guns, sufficed and one enemy aircraft was shot down near Orly Ferme. On the 15th near Gorze a four plane patrol was attacked by six German Pfalz D.III aircraft; One enemy aircraft was shot down by observer William Terry Badham in aircraft flown by Lt. Kenny; Kenney and Badham received the Silver Star.

Heavy rain beginning on the 16th kept the 91st on the ground for the next three days, and on 20 September the 91st was ordered to move to Vavincourt Aerodrome, with new orders to fly observation missions over the Verdun-Argonne sector in preparation for the planned Meuse-Argonne Offensive. The squadron moved by the 22d, and on the 23d operations began from the new station. By early October, with the American infantry advancing on all points between the Argonne and the Meuse, German aircraft were concentrating all available resources to stop the Air Service from getting information about its rear areas. Enemy aircraft were constantly attacking squadron aircraft with a far higher intensity than what was experienced earlier, and the 91st brought down a number of enemy planes, far out of proportion to what might be expected from an observation squadron.

Throughout October intense flying and air combat was routine. The month closed in a great blaze of activity. A great number of missions were carried out in spite of constant attacks by enemy aircraft. On the 9th Lt. Kenney and his observer where attacked near Jametz in which one enemy aircraft was shot down and others driven off-Kenny would later be awarded the DSC. On the 30th, six combats were engaged in, with two enemy aircraft being shot down. Lieutenants Strahm and Jervey and Lambert and Pope started on a photographic mission between Montmedy and Longuyon when they were attacked by 14 enemy Fokkers. A wild combat followed in which two enemy aircraft were shot down and another went into a straight nose dive into the ground. The squadron's formation, however, had been driven off-course during the mission and one squadron aircraft had to return to Vavincourt, being badly shot-up. Lieutenants Strahm and Jervey, however continued their mission, taking a total of 66 photographs. Bad weather kept the squadron grounded until 4 November when operations resumed. On that day, three German aircraft were shot down.

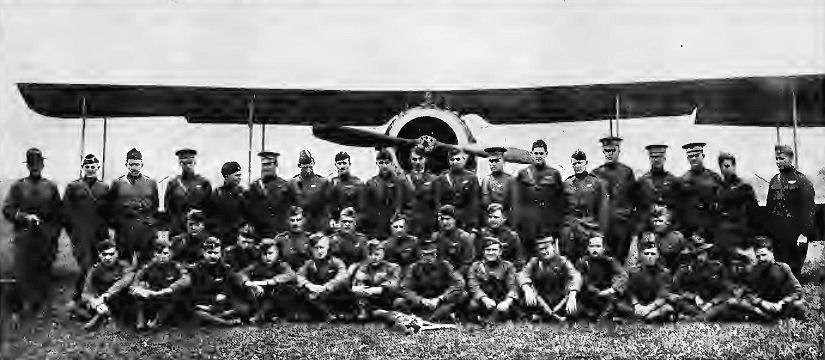
91st Aero Squadron – November 1918, Vavincourt Aerodrome, France.Lt Kenney second from right in the back row

On the last day of combat operations, 10 November, the 91st had its final casualty when Lieutenants Bruch and White's aircraft was shot down on a mission over Stenay. Their aircraft became lost in a fog and low-hanging clouds. This was especially unfortunate as the following day, hostilities ceased according to the terms of the armistice that had been signed with Germany.

Over the course of its observation missions, the squadron engaged in 139 aerial combats and brought down 21 enemy planes during the over 1,000 hours it flew behind enemy lines. For its instrumental role in the 1918 campaigns of the American Expeditionary Forces in France, Headquarters, French Armies of the East awarded the 91st Aero Squadron with the French Croix de Guerre (French War Cross) with palms for bravery, efficiency and assistance on 8 March 1919.

The citation which was signed by French General Philippe Pétain and accompanied the award read: "The first squadron of the American Army called to execute long distance reconnaissance, it immediately realized, with admirable comprehension, the needs of high command. Thanks to the bravery and untiring devotion of its excellent personnel, it brought back the most valuable information, covered 18,000 kilometres (11,000 mi) of enemy territory, taking more than 2,500 photographs and engaging in 58 combats during which four enemy planes were destroyed".

=== Third Army of occupation ===
The first event of importance following the armistice was the dinner on 13 November, given in one of the hangars to celebrate the first anniversary of the squadron's arrival in France. During the first few days after the armistice, all sorts of rumors were floating around, mostly concerned with when the squadron was returning home, until it was learned that the squadron was to be part of Third Army of Occupation on the Rhine.

On 21 November, the first move was made from Vavincourt to Preutin Aerodrome, a former German airdrome, roughly 25 miles (40 km) northwest of Metz. As a field occupied by the Germans a very short time before, Preutin was populated by a number of Fokkers and other aircraft, wrecked by American infantry on their passage through the area. The town was full of evidence of the German occupation, and the chateau where most of the officers were billeted was a former German officer billet, and was full of luxuries not seen by the Americans at Vavincourt. The people in the village had many stories about the Germans and their four years of occupation, and the fighting for Verdun. The principal event of the squadron's stay there was Thanksgiving Day, memorable mainly for the fine dinner in which officers and men celebrated – corned Wilhelm, called turkey in honor of (he day, canned corn, canned tomatoes, canned everything. A saving feature of the stay at Preutin With the nearness of Metz and Luxembourg, both cities that all were anxious to visit, and to which parties went daily.

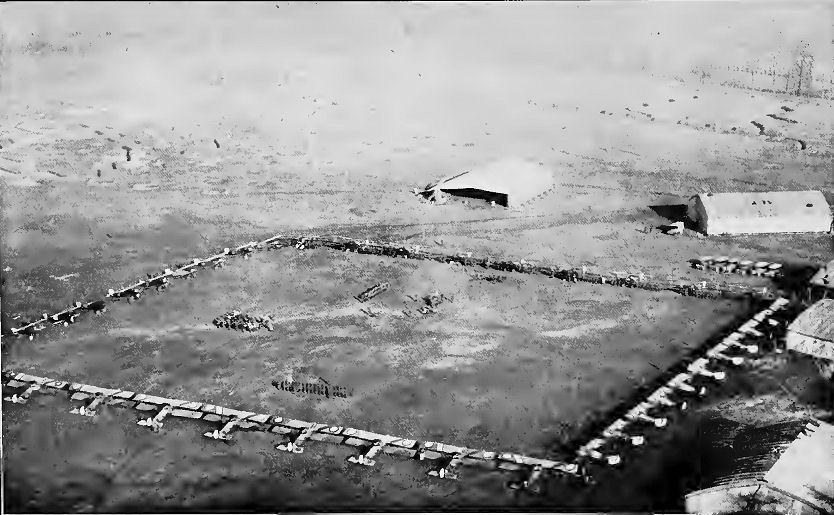
Medal ceremony, Coblenz Airfield, January 1919

On 2 December, orders came to move on to Trier Airfield, on the Moselle, about sixty miles from Preutin. The squadron flew their Salmsons on the receipt of the news. Bad weather for the next few days slowed the move, however, the work of moving the squadron nevertheless went on, as it was a two-day haul. It was at Trier that the 91st had its first opportunity to fly German aircraft turned over to the Allies, and for taking rides in the Fokker or the Pfaltz became a popular pastime. Christmas Day we spent at Trier, the second Christmas in Europe for the squadron. No one had home comforts as Christmas stockings, but the atmosphere at the dinner given in the hangar by the men at two o'clock, to which all the officers originally in the squadron were invited. the tree in the center of the hangar was decorated as they were at home.

New Year's Day was also spent at Trier, and orders for the move to Coblenz Airfield came in the afternoon. Both the Salmson and also some Spads took off the next morning. Following their arrival at Coblenz, orders came for the rest of the squadron to stay in Trier until more hangars could be erected at the Coblenz field. On Saturday, 4 January 1919, word was received to ferry up the airplanes and move all rest of the squadron up by truck. What might have been a serious accident occurred when a De Havilland DH-4 landed at Trier, ran into a Fokker taxiing to take off. The DH-4's propeller sliced the fuselage of the Fokker directly behind the pilot's seat, rolled the aircraft over but the pilot emerged relatively unhurt, but with a wrenched knee.

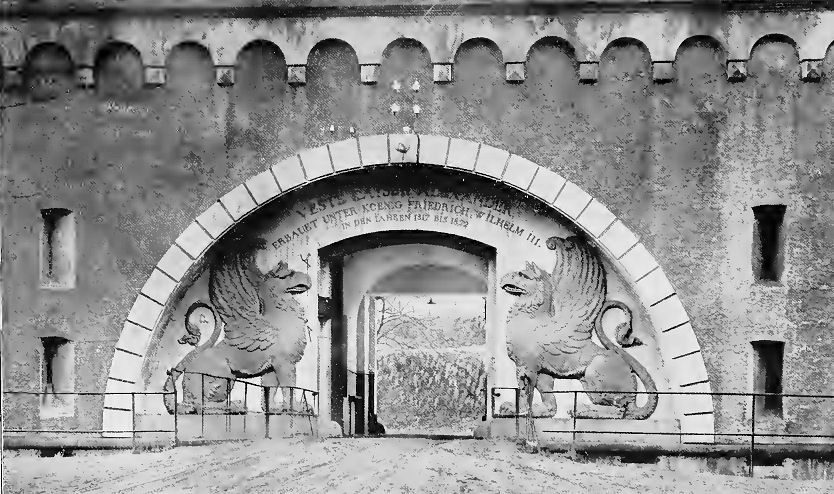
Entrance to Coblenz Airfield

On the squadron's arrival at Coblenz, it was found that the 91st, 94th and 12th Squadrons were to occupy Fort Alexander (Feste Kaiser Alexander) on the steep hill to the west of the city. The airfield was a former parade ground, and the work of putting up hangars was still in progress. On 10 January, Brigadier-General William Mitchell, in an impressive ceremony, decorated the officers to whom Distinguished Flying Crosses had been awarded some time previously, after the ceremony of decoration. General Mitchell, Who was to leave for the States in a few days, made a short farewell address, in which he paid a tribute to the work of the 91st, saying "No squadron ever performed such reconnaissances as you have, working fifty kilometers behind the lines, and getting away with it."

Tuesday afternoon, 18 February saw the squadron, with a band from the 4th Air Park, line up on the field in front of a line of Salmsons and German planes to receive the Letters of Merit awarded by the Air Service Commander, First Army. One of the 91st's Commanders during this period was 1st Lt George Kenney. Lt Kenney would stay in the Air Corps after the war and later become the Commander of the Far East Air Force during World War II. General Kenney became General Douglas MacArthur's air commander in his island hopping campaign in the Pacific and after World War II became the first commander of the Strategic Air Command.

=== Demobilization ===
Finally in mid April, orders were received to move to the 1st Air Depot at Colombey-les-Belles Airdrome, at which all equipment would be turned in prior to departing France for the United States. The squadron's Salmson aircraft were delivered to the Air Service American Air Service Acceptance Park No. 1 at Orly Aerodrome to be returned to the French. There practically all of the pilots and observers were detached from the squadron.

Personnel at Colombey were subsequently assigned to the commanding general, services of supply, and ordered to report to the Brest, France staging camp on 19 May. There, personnel awaited scheduling for transport to the United States. Several weeks later, on 3 June the 91st boarded a troop ship heading for the Port of New York, where the squadron arrived on the 17th. At Mitchell Field, most squadron members were processed out of the Air Corps, and returned to civilian life.

=== Lineage ===
- Organized as: 91st Aero Squadron on 21 August 1917

Re-designated: 91st Aero Squadron (Army Observation), 14 December 1917
Re-designated: 91st Squadron on 14 March 1921

=== Assignments ===
- Post Headquarters, Kelly Field, 21 August 1917
- Aviation Concentration Center, 5 October 1917
- General HQ, American Expeditionary Forces, 10 November 1917
- First Army Observation Group, 13 December 1917
- I Corps Observation Group School, January 1918 (already at Amanty from 14 December 1917).
- First Army Observation Group, 6 September 1918
- Third Army Air Service, 21 November 1918
- 1st Air Depot, 16 April 1919
- Commanding General, Services of Supply, 16 May-3 June 1919

Return transport, 3–16 June 1919

- Post Headquarters, Mitchell Field, 17 June 1919
- Southeastern Department, July 1919
- Western Department, September 1919
- IX Corps Area, 20 August 1920

=== Stations ===
- Kelly Field, Texas, 21 August 1917
- Aviation Concentration Center, Garden City, New York, 5–27 October 1917
- Port of Entry, Hoboken, New Jersey

Overseas transport, RMS Adriatic, 27 October-10 November 1917

- Chaumont Hill 402 Aerodrome, France, 15 November 1917
- Amanty Airdrome, France, 14 December 1917
- Gondreville-sur-Moselle Aerodrome, France, 24 May 1918
- Vavincourt Aerodrome, France, 21 September 1918

Detachment operated from Souilly Aerodrome, 16 October–November 1918

- Preutin Aerodrome, France, 21 November 1918
- Trier Airdrome, Germany 8 December 1918
- Coblenz Airdrome, Fort Kaiser Alexander, Germany, 19 January 1919
- Colombey-les-Belles Airdrome, France, 17 April 1919
- Le Mans, France, 6 May 1919
- Brest, France, 19 May – 3 June 1919
- Mitchel Field, New York, 17 June 1919
- Park Field, Tennessee, 4 July 1919
- Rockwell Field, California, 29 September 1919
- Mather Field, California, 3 November 1919
- Ream Field, California, 24 January 1920

Flight, or detachment thereof, operated from El Centro and Calexico, California, 17 March – 30 July 1920

- Rockwell Field, California, 30 April 1920

Flight operated from Eugene, Oregon, and detachment thereof from Medford, Oregon, June-c. September 1920

- Mather Field, California, 3 November 1920

Detachment at Rockwell Field, California, to January 1921

=== Combat sectors and campaigns ===
Streamer	Sector/Campaign	Dates	Notes
	Toul Sector	3 June-11 September 1918	
	St. Mihiel Offensive Campaign	12–16 September 1918	
	Meuse-Argonne Offensive Campaign	26 September-11 November 1918	

=== Notable personnel ===
- Maj. John N. Reynolds, Awarded two DSCs, 2 aerial victories
- Lt. William T. Badham, DSC, SSC (2x), Air Ace
- Lt. Paul D. Coles, SSC
- Capt. Everett R. Cook, DSC, SSC, Air Ace
- Lt. John W. Cousins, DSC, SSC, 2 aerial victories
- Lt. Willis A. Diekeman, SSC
- Capt. Kingman Douglass, DSC, 3 aerial victories
- 1Lt. Asa North Duncan -in 1942 was a Brigadier General/chief of staff of General Tooey Spaatz
- Capt. Leonard C. Hammond, DSC, SSC, Air Ace
- Capt. Kenyon Roper, (MIA - 14 Sept. 1918)
- 1Lt. Robert G. Scott, (KIA - 4 Oct. 1918)
- 2Lt. Louis M. Burch, (KIA - 10 Nov. 1918)
- 1Lt. Franz F. Schilling, (KIA - 2 Jul. 1918)
- 1Lt. Howard T. Baker, (KIA - 14 Aug. 1918) 1 aerial victory
- 2Lt. William A. White, (POW & Died of Wounds - 10 Nov. 1918)
- 1Lt. Paul H. "Huggy" Hughey, (KIA - 14 Sept. 1918)
- Lt. Asher E. Kelty, DSC, (KIA - 26 Sept. 1918)
- Lt. George C. Kenney, DSC (2x), DSM (2x), SSC, 2 aerial victories
- 2Lt. Emil C. Kiel
- Lt. John H. Lambert, DSC, SSC, 3 aerial victories
- Lt. Walter R. Lawson, DSC, SSC, 1 aerial victory
- Lt. Francis B. Lowry, DSC, (KIA - 26 Sept. 1918)

Lowry AFB, Colorado's (1938–1994) namesake.

- Maj. Victor H. Strahm, DSC, SSC, Air Ace
- Lt. John W. Van Heuvel, SSC
- Capt. James C. Wallis, SSC
- 2Lt. Frederick K. Hirth, (KIA - 16 Jul. 1918)
- 2Lt. Raymond R. Sebring, (KIA - 4 Sep. 1918)

DSC: Distinguished Service Cross; SSC: Silver Star Citation; DSM: Army Distinguished Service Medal; KIA: Killed in Action; MIA:Missing in Action; POW: Prisoner of War;

== See also ==
- List of American aero squadrons
- Organization of the Air Service of the American Expeditionary Force
