= Strahm =

Strahm may refer to:

- Dale Strahm (born c. 1943), American football coach
- Dick Strahm (born 1934), American football coach
- Matt Strahm (born 1991), American baseball player
- Peter Strahm, a character in Saw
- Victor Herbert Strahm (1895–1957), World War I flying ace
