= Gondreville-sur-Moselle Aerodrome =

- Part of American Expeditionary Forces (AEF)
- Located near: Gondreville, France
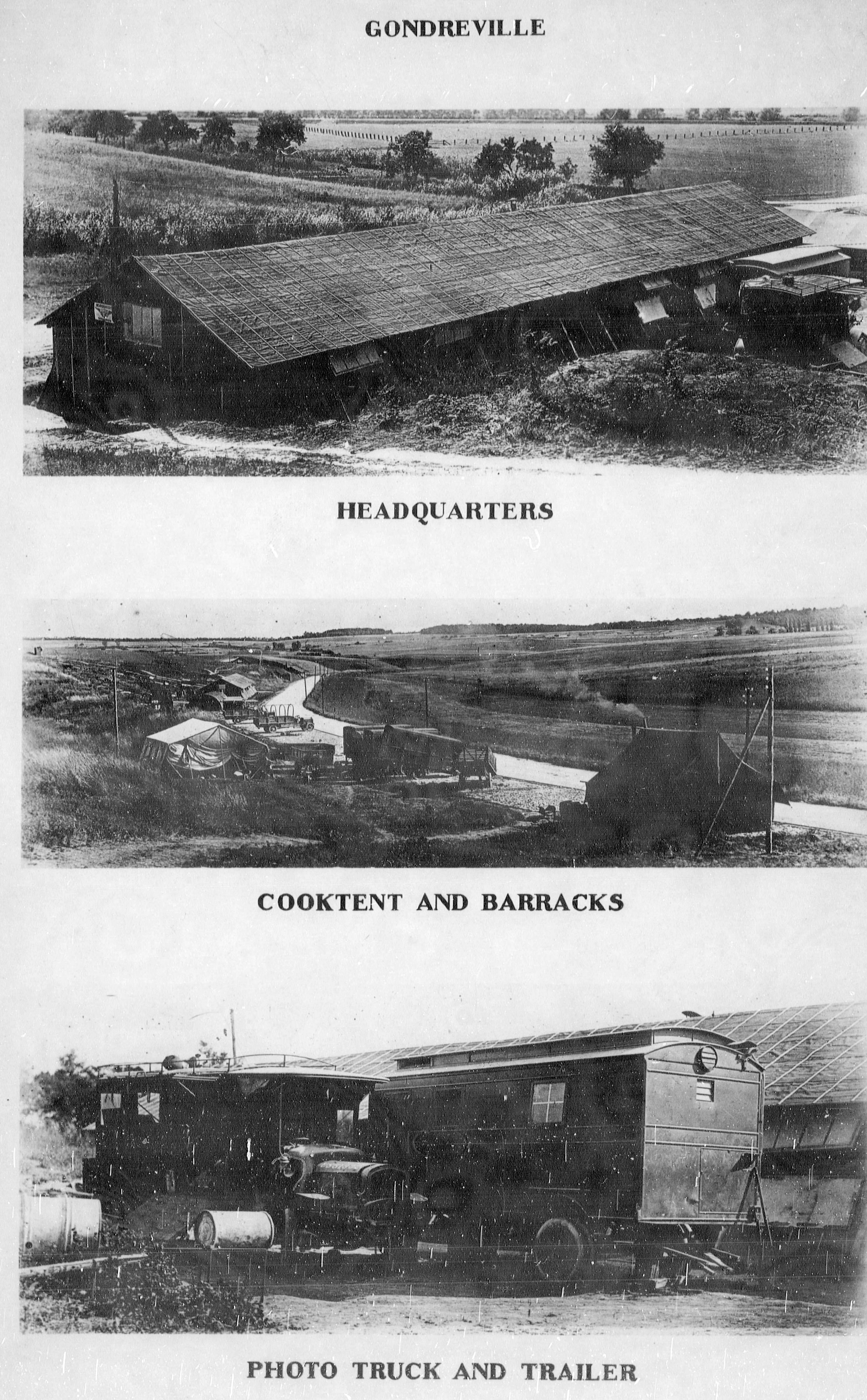
- Various scenes of Gondreville-sur-Moselle Aerodrome

Site information
- Type: Combat Airfield
- Controlled by: Air Service, United States Army
- Condition: Agricultural area

Location
- Coordinates: 48°41′02″N 05°57′56″E

Site history
- Built: 1918
- In use: 1918–1919
- Battles/wars: World War I

Garrison information
- Garrison: First Army Observation Group; United States First Army Air Service

Gondreville-sur-Moselle Aerodrome was a temporary World War I airfield in France, used by the Air Service, United States Army. It was located 0.7 miles (1.1 km) South of Gondreville, Meurthe-et-Moselle department in north-eastern France.

== Overview ==
The airfield was built during spring of 1918 with various aircraft hangars, support buildings and quarters for personnel. It was used by 91st Aero Squadron from late May 1918, working for the headquarters of the First Army Observation Group, providing long-range and strategic reconnaissance missions over enemy territory, especially during the St. Mihiel Offensive. It was joined by 24th Aero Squadron in late August, both becoming part of the 1st Army Observation Group formed on 6 September 1918.

The airfield, however, became redundant at the end of September prior to the Meuse-Argonne Offensive, and the group was moved to Vavincourt Aerodrome. Gondreville was vacated and later turned over to the French "Aeronautique Militaire" which used it until March 1919; the airfield was then returned to agricultural use. Today it is a series of cultivated fields located south of Gondreville. The airfield was located to the south of the A31 autoroute, with no indications of its wartime use.

== Known units assigned ==
- Headquarters, 1st Army Observation Group, 6 – 22 September 1918
- 91st Aero Squadron (Observation) 24 May – 21 September 1918
- 24th Aero Squadron, (Observation) 22 August – 22 September 1918

== See also ==
- List of Air Service American Expeditionary Force aerodromes in France
