= William Terry Badham =

American World War I flying ace

- Born: September 27, 1895; Birmingham, Alabama, USA
- Died: June 6, 1991 (aged 95); Mentone, Alabama, USA
- Burial place: Elmwood Cemetery, Birmingham, Alabama Plot: Block 16
- Military career
- Allegiance: United States
- Branch: Aéronautique Militaire (France); Air Service, United States Army; United States Army Air Forces
- Rank: Brigadier General
- Units: Aéronautique Militaire: Escadrille AR.214; Escadrille BR.40; Escadrille BR.210; Air Service, United States Army: 91st Aero Squadron; United States Army Air Forces: Eighth Air Force; Ninth Air Force
- Conflicts: World War I World War II
- Awards: Distinguished Service Order

William Terry Badham was a World War I fighter ace credited with five victories. He was one of four Americans to earn the title of "Ace" as an observer/gunner during World War I.

== World War I ==
Badham graduated from Yale in 1917. He then joined the French air service. He served as a gunner/observer in several French observation squadrons. After training, he reported to the 210th Observation Squadron of the Fourth French Army near Metz, where he flew Latour and Breguet aircraft.

In May 1918, he transferred to the Air Service, United States Army, and was assigned to the First Army Air Service 91st Aero Squadron, an American observation unit flying Salmson 2A2s at Gondreville-sur-Moselle Aerodrome.

Badham scored his first victory on 15 September 1918, his pilot was his commanding officer, George Kenney. For the next four, from 23 through 29 October 1918, it was Everett Cook. For his actions, he was awarded the Distinguished Service Cross. On 29 October, he scored the last of five victories gained over the battlefields of Saint Mihiel and Meuse-Argonne. First Lieutenant Badham remained with the 91st until January 1919.

== Postwar ==
After World War I, William T. Badham established a small chemical business, Naphthalene Products Company, using the naphthalene gas from coke ovens in Birmingham to manufacture items which included mothballs and insecticides.

A brigadier general during World War II, he served with the U.S. 8th Air Force in England and the Middle East.

Drawing since he was ten years old, painting became an increasingly serious aspect of his life. By the age of fifty with his business successful, he was able to devote most of his time to painting while traveling over Europe and Mexico. He began to specialize in watercolor landscapes. His paintings have been exhibited in museums and galleries in the United States and abroad.

== Honors and awards ==
- Distinguished Service Cross (DSC) October 23, 1918

The Distinguished Service Cross is presented to William T. Badham, First Lieutenant (Air Service), U.S. Army, for extraordinary heroism in action near Buzancy, France, October 23, 1918. First Lieutenant Badham gave proof of exceptional bravery while on a photographic mission 25 kilometers within the enemy lines. His plane was attacked, by a formation of 30 enemy aircraft. By skillful work with his machine-gun, Lieutenant Badham successfully repelled the attack and destroyed two German planes. At the same time he manipulated his camera and obtained photographs of great military value. (General Orders No. 7, W.D., 1919)

- Silver Star Citation (SSC) September 15, 1918

By direction of the President, under the provisions of the act of Congress approved July 9, 1918 (Bul. No. 43, W.D., 1918), Second Lieutenant (Air Service) William T. Badham, United States Army Air Service, is cited by the Commanding General, American Expeditionary Forces, for gallantry in action and a silver star may be placed upon the ribbon of the Victory Medals awarded him. Second Lieutenant Badham distinguished himself by gallantry in action while serving as an Observer with the 91st Aero Squadron, American Expeditionary Forces, in action near Metz, Alsace, while on a photographic mission, 15 September 1918. General Orders: GHQ, American Expeditionary Forces, Citation Orders No. 1 (June 3, 1919)

- Silver Star Citation (SSC) October 29, 1918

By direction of the President, under the provisions of the act of Congress approved July 9, 1918 (Bul. No. 43, W.D., 1918), First Lieutenant (Air Service) William T. Badham, United States Army Air Service, is cited by the Commanding General, American Expeditionary Forces, for gallantry in action and a silver star may be placed upon the ribbon of the Victory Medals awarded him. First Lieutenant Badham distinguished himself by gallantry in action while serving as an Observer with the 91st Aero Squadron, American Expeditionary Forces, in action in the vicinity of Grand Pre, France, 29 October 1918, while on a patrol which secured valuable photographs. General Orders: GHQ, American Expeditionary Forces, Citation Orders No. 8 (March 1, 1920)

== See also ==
- List of World War I flying aces from the United States

== Bibliography ==
- Franks, Norman (2001) American Aces of World War 1. Illustrated by Harry Dempsey. Oxford: Osprey Publishing, ISBN 1-84176-375-6, ISBN 978-1-84176-375-0.
- "Eyes of the Eagle, The Exploits of Henry Lee Badham, Jr. and William Terry Badham in the AEF" Thomas E. Badham, Manuscript 1999.
