= Everett Richard Cook =

American World War I flying ace

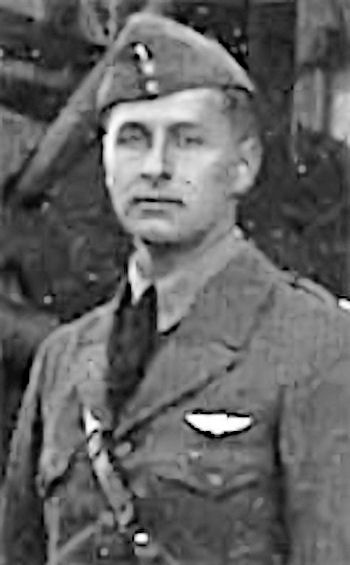
- Everett Richard Cook, 1918
- Born: 13 December 1894; Indianapolis, Indiana, USA
- Died: 21 January 1974 (aged 79); Memphis, Tennessee, USA
- Military career
- Allegiance: United States
- Branch: Air Service, United States Army, U.S.A.F.
- Service years: 1917–1919; 1942–1945
- Rank: Brigadier General
- Nickname: Cookie
- Units: Air Service, United States Army (WW I): 91st Aero Squadron; United States Air Force (WW II): 8th & 12th Air Force
- Commands: 91st Aero Squadron
- Conflicts: World War I
- Awards: Distinguished Service Cross, Silver Star, Legion of Merit, French Legion d'Honneur and Croix de Guerre

Brigadier General Everett Richard Cook was a World War I flying ace credited with five aerial victories. During World War II, Cook became Deputy Chief of Staff for the U. S. 8th Air Force, headquartered in London, under the command of General Carl "Toohey" Spaatz.

== Biography ==
=== World War I ===
Cook joined the U. S. Army "Aero Service," the embryonic predecessor of the U.S. Air Force, in May 1917. He entered service as a first lieutenant in the European theater in November, 1917, and began flying reconnaissance missions in combat, behind enemy lines on June 3, 1918.

By September 1918, he had risen to commander of the 91st Aero Squadron and attained the rank of captain on November 3, 1918, just a week before the Armistice. He flew a Salmson 2A2 for his five victories over German fighters in September and October 1918. His gunner for four of those wins was William T. Badham. He was awarded the Distinguished Service Cross, Legion d'Honneur, and Croix de Guerre, and the 91st, collectively, was decorated with the Croix de Guerre with Palm.

=== Inter-war era ===
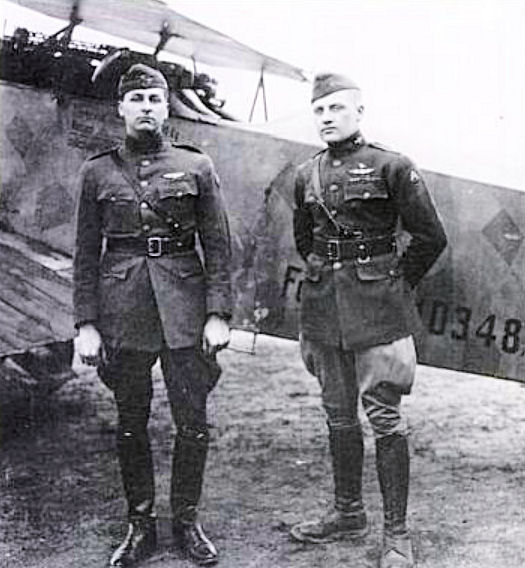
Captains Everett Cook (91st Observation Squadron) and Reed McKinley Chambers (94th Pursuit Squadron) in front of a captured German Fokker D. VII., 1918

Cook served on General Billy Mitchell's staff after World War I. He then joined the Memphis Cotton Exchange, becoming its president in 1931. Cook founded the "Memphis Cotton Carnival" in 1931 to bring attention to the Cotton Exchange, and the Carnival has run every successive year since 1931 except three years during World War II. Cook's daughter, Phoebe Cook, was Queen of the Cotton Carnival in 1946, and his son Edward W. "Ned" Cook, a U.S.A.F. fighter pilot in World War II, was King of the Carnival in 1951.

Everett R. Cook was a founder of The Cotton Research Foundation (1936) and the National Cotton Council (1938), and served as chairman of the Council's export committee. It was his position on the Council, which, in early 1942, led to his appointment as Vice President of the Commodity Credit Association, where he was "in charge of importation of all agricultural products in the United States."

=== World War II ===
In August, 1942, Major General Asa Duncan, a former member of Cook's Ninety-First Aero Squadron and Chief of Staff to General Carl "Toohey" Spaatz, commander of all U.S. Air Forces in Europe, asked Everett R. Cook to return to military service as General Spaatz's Deputy Chief of Staff. Cook re-enlisted as a Colonel of the newly formed U.S. Air Force, of which General Spaatz eventually became the first Chief of Staff. After the German surrender, General Spaatz was ordered to Guam where he commanded U.S. Air Forces in the Pacific. Among his responsibilities, Spaatz issued the orders to drop atomic bombs on Hiroshima and Nagasaki, Japan, in 1945, on direct instructions from President Truman.

When General Dwight D. Eisenhower formed plans for the invasion of North Africa to thwart German Field Marshal Irwin Rommel's advances, in operation "Torch," Eisenhower called on General Spaatz to head the gathering 12th U.S. Air Force, headquartered in Algiers. Major General "Ted" Curtis and Colonel Cook were chosen by General Spaatz as the Chief of Staff and Deputy Chief of Staff, respectively, of the 12th Air Force.

Colonel Cook attended the German surrender ceremony in Berlin and was chosen by General Spaatz and British Air Chief Marshal Tedder to transport the officers who represented the German military forces at the ceremony: Field Marshal Wilhelm Keitel, commander of ground forces and over-all commander of forces in Germany; Admiral Hans Georg von Friedeburg, over-all commander of the German Navy; and Colonel General Paul F. Stumpf, over-all commander of the German air forces. He was awarded the Legion of Merit and a Silver Star for his services as "A-1" of American Forces in the 8th and 12th Air Forces, rising to the rank of brigadier general.

=== Later government service ===
Cook also served as Special Assistant War Food Administrator to the Secretary of Agriculture and was a Consultant to the Department of State during two returns to the continental U.S., during the war.

Post World War II, Cook joined Eddie Rickenbacker on the Board of Directors of Eastern Airlines. He also parlayed his cotton business, Cook & Co., Inc., into a vast financial success, eventually becoming Cook Industries, Inc., a subsidiary of which was Terminix International. Cook was a long-serving Chairman of the Memphis Auditorium Commission and was proposed by Memphis political boss E.H. Crump to be on the Tennessee Constitutional Committee, to which he was elected in 1953. From 1953-1956, Cook served President Dwight D. Eisenhower on the Rubber Producing Facilities Disposal Commission, through which the Federal government was divesting itself of rubber production facilities it had acquired and owned due to the need for wartime supplies. When Memphis built its new convention center in the early 1970s, it was named the "Everett R. Cook Convention Center and Auditorium."

In 1948, new U.S.A.F. Chief General Spaatz requested that Brigadier General Cook accept General Spaatz's former position as Secretary of the Air Force, which Cook declined, citing family and business responsibilities. General Cook also declined General Eisenhower's request that Cook provide his "able assistance" to "get NATO working promptly and effectively," when Eisenhower became the Commanding General of NATO forces in Paris, in 1952. Eisenhower and Cook remained close friends, however, and General Cook was a guest at the White House on several occasions including dinners for the "Radio Free Europe" campaign. Of the twenty-three guests invited to the first "Radio Free Europe" dinner—which included the presidents or chairmen of Standard Oil, Union Carbide, General Motors, Paramount Pictures, AT&T, International Harvester, Chase National Bank, and Goodyear—President Eisenhower said to Cook, "Everett, you'd better introduce these people, because some of them I don't know as well as I'd like to."

== Honors and awards ==
Distinguished Service Cross (DSC)

The Distinguished Service Cross is presented to Everett Richard Cook, Captain (Air Service), U.S. Army, for extraordinary heroism in action near Damvillers, France, September 26, 1918. While on a photographic mission in the vicinity of Damvillers which necessitated a penetration of 20 kilometers within the enemy lines, Captain Cook was attacked by seven enemy pursuit planes, and his plane was riddled with bullets. In spite of the attack he continued on his mission, turning only for our lines when his observer had secured photographs of great military value. In the combat one enemy aircraft was destroyed.

== See also ==
- List of World War I flying aces from the United States

== Bibliography ==
American Aces of World War 1 Harry Dempsey. Osprey Publishing, 2001. ISBN 1-84176-375-6, ISBN 978-1-84176-375-0. Everett R. Cook, A Memoir part of the Oral History Project of the Library of Congress, adapted and edited in print by Professor Joseph Riggs, Memphis State University, and Margaret Lawrence, Archivist of the Memphis Public Library. Memphis Public Library, 1971.
