= Samuel Reeves Keesler =

Samuel Reeves Keesler, Jr.
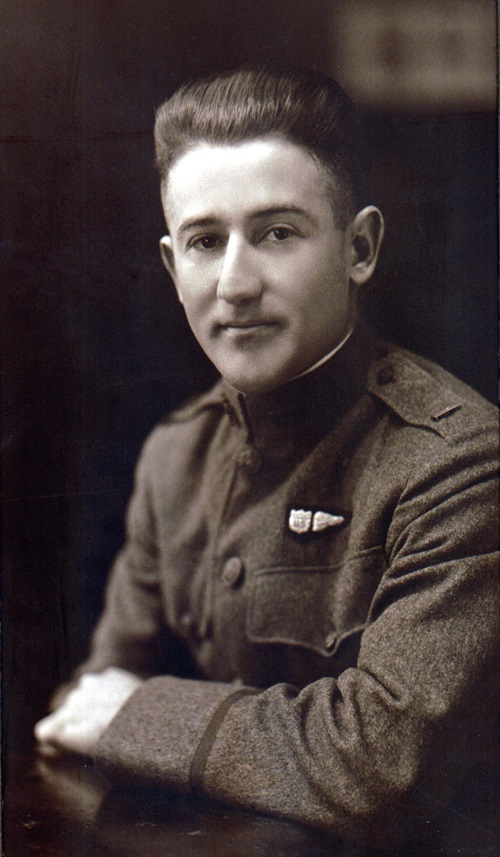
- Born: April 11, 1896; Greenwood, Mississippi
- Died: October 10, 1918 (aged 22) near Verdun, France
- Military career
- Allegiance: United States
- Branch: United States Army Air Service
- Service years: 1917 – 1918
- Rank: Second Lieutenant
- Unit: 24th Aero Squadron
- Conflicts: World War I (DOW)
- Awards: Silver Star

Samuel Reeves Keesler, Jr. (April 11, 1896 – October 10, 1918) was a member of the United States Army Air Service in World War I posthumously awarded the Citation Star for gallantry.

== Biography ==
=== Early life ===
Keesler was born in Greenwood, Mississippi on April 11, 1896. He was an outstanding student leader and athlete in high school and at Davidson College in North Carolina.

=== Military career ===
Keesler entered the U.S. Army on May 13, 1917. He was commissioned in the Signal Officers' Reserve Corps on August 15, and he received training as an aerial observer at Post Field, Oklahoma, before sailing for France in March 1918.

After additional training in aerial gunnery and artillery fire control, Second Lieutenant Keesler was posted to the 24th Aero Squadron in the Verdun sector of the Western Front on August 26, 1918.

While performing a reconnaissance mission in the late afternoon of October 8, 1918, Keesler and his pilot, 1LT Harold W. Riley, were attacked by four enemy fighters. Keesler returned fire and shot down the leader, but Riley lost control of their badly damaged plane. Keesler continued to fend off the attackers with machine gun fire even as the plane fell. Keesler was wounded six times in the chest and abdomen before the plane crash-landed, and received an additional wound when the enemy fighters strafed the pair on the ground.

Captured by German ground troops, the two airmen were unable to receive immediate medical attention, and Keesler died the following day. On January 16, 1919, Lt. Riley recommended him for a decoration, citing his continued resistance all the way to the ground, despite his wounds. For his gallantry, Lieutenant Keesler was posthumously awarded the Silver Star on June 3, 1919.

Keesler Air Force Base in Biloxi, Mississippi was named in his honor.

=== Silver Star citation ===
General Orders: GHQ, American Expeditionary Forces, Citation Orders No. 3 (June 3, 1919)
Action Date: October 8, 1918
Service: Army Air Service
Rank: Second Lieutenant
Company: 24th Aero Squadron
Division: American Expeditionary Forces

By direction of the President, under the provisions of the act of Congress approved July 9, 1918 (Bul. No. 43, W.D., 1918), Second Lieutenant (Air Service) Samuel Reeves Keesler, United States Army Air Service, is cited (Posthumously) for gallantry in action and a silver star may be placed upon the ribbon of the Victory Medals awarded him. Second Lieutenant Keesler distinguished himself by gallantry in action while serving as an Aerial Observer with the 24th Aero Squadron, American Expeditionary Forces, in action near Verdun, France, 8 October 1918, in bringing down one of an enemy formation of four planes.
