= Chaumont-sur-Aire Airdrome =

French airfield

Chaumont-Hill 402 Airdrome
- Part of American Expeditionary Forces (AEF)
- Located near: Chaumont, France
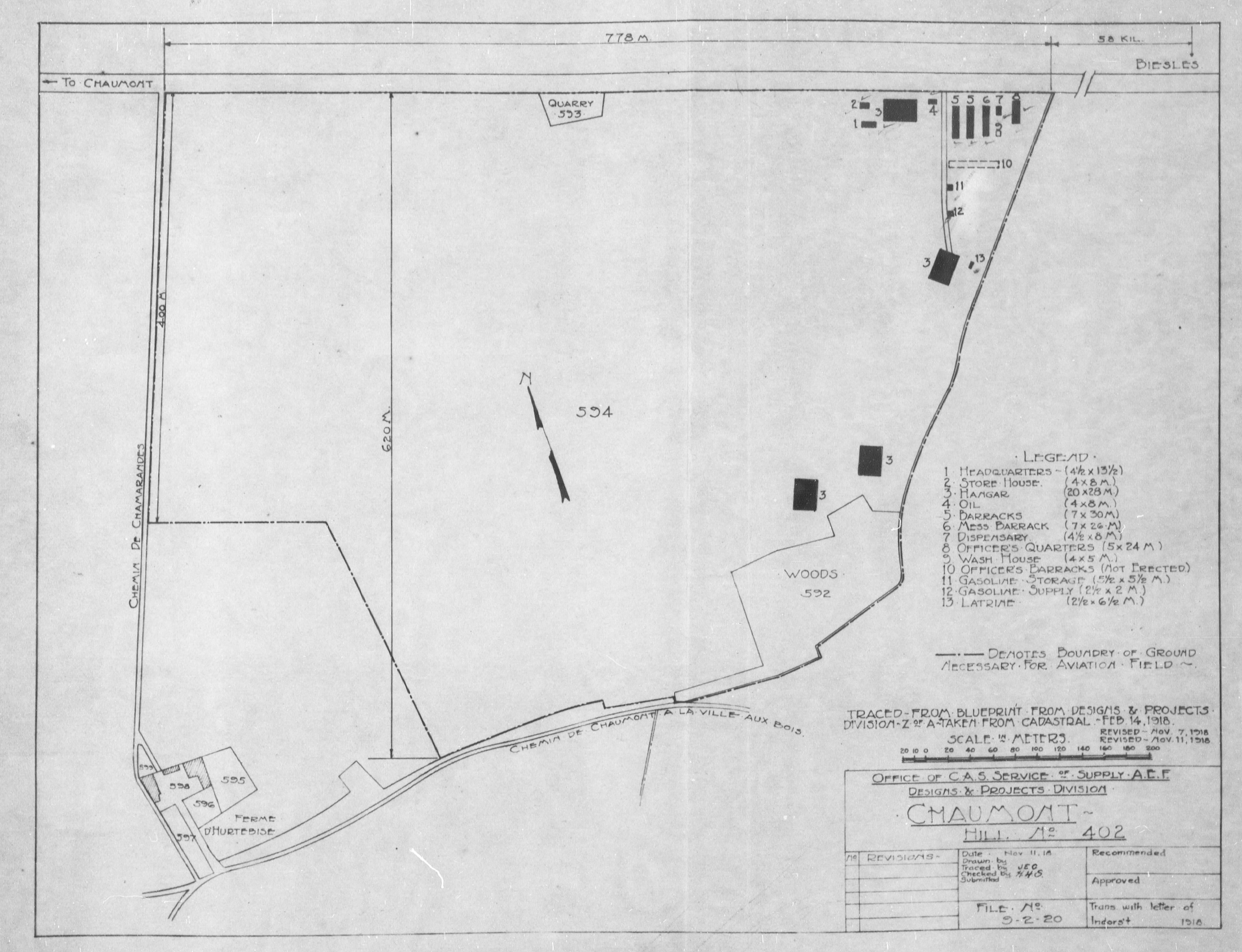

Site information
- Type: Combat Airfield
- Controlled by: Air Service, United States Army
- Condition: Agricultural area

Location
- Coordinates: 48°06′04″N 005°12′51″E

Site history
- Built: 1918
- In use: 1918–1919
- Battles/wars: World War I

Garrison information
- Garrison: I Corps Observation Group; 1st Pursuit Wing; United States First Army Air Service

Chaumont-Hill 402, was a temporary World War I airfield in France, used by squadrons of the Air Service, United States Army, and named after the height (402 m) of its highest point. It was located east-southeast of the city of Chaumont, in the Haute-Marne department in the Champagne-Ardenne region of north-eastern France, between the main road and the "Ferme d'Heurtebise", 0.5 miles (0.80 km) west of the village of Laville aux Bois (in April 1919, French escadrille VB 101 stayed a few days on the airfield called "Laville aux Bois" in French Army archives).

== Overview ==
The airfield was first leased by the Air Service on 11 October 1917, consisting of 89 acres. Air Service engineers constructed 12 wooden barracks and a mess hall on the site, plus five buildings to be used as warehouses and maintenance shops. A station administration building and a hospital clinic were constructed, plus an electrical grid and a telephone grid. The airfield had four French Bessonneau hangars erected.

In mid-November 1917, the facility was turned over to the First Army Air Service, which had it constructed with the help of the 91st Aero Squadron from 15 November to 14 December 1917 while training (its pilots did not arrived until February 1918, after the squadron had moved to Amanty aerodrome). A few weeks later, the 12th Aero Squadron arrived at Chaumont, also in its ground training phase, staying from 16 January to 2 February 1918.

Chaumont Hill 402 Airdrome was selected as the Headquarters airfield for the nearby Headquarters, Air Service, AEF, which was stationed in the city of Chaumont; after February 1918, it was only occupied by a small detail of men, whose duty was to guard the Headquarters' aircraft.

The airfield was placed back into combat status in September 1918, station for the 85th Aero Squadron 30 September – 4 November 1918 (De Havilland DH-4), initially on training then being part of the Second Army Observation Group (with some French escadrilles stationed on other airfields), when the later's HQ arrived on 25 October 1918 and stayed until been demobilized on 4 November 1918.

The 1st Pursuit Wing had its HQ in Chaumont, 24 September to 17 December 1918, but most probably barracked downtown, which did not excluded liaison flying from the airfield.

After the Armistice was signed, the 99th Aero Squadron, part of the V Corps Observation Group flew from 13 December 1918 to 19 February 1919, with detachments on Prauthoy, Bourbonne-les-Bains, and Montigny-le-Roi airfields, before starting its demobilization at 1st Air Deport at Colombey-les-Belles.

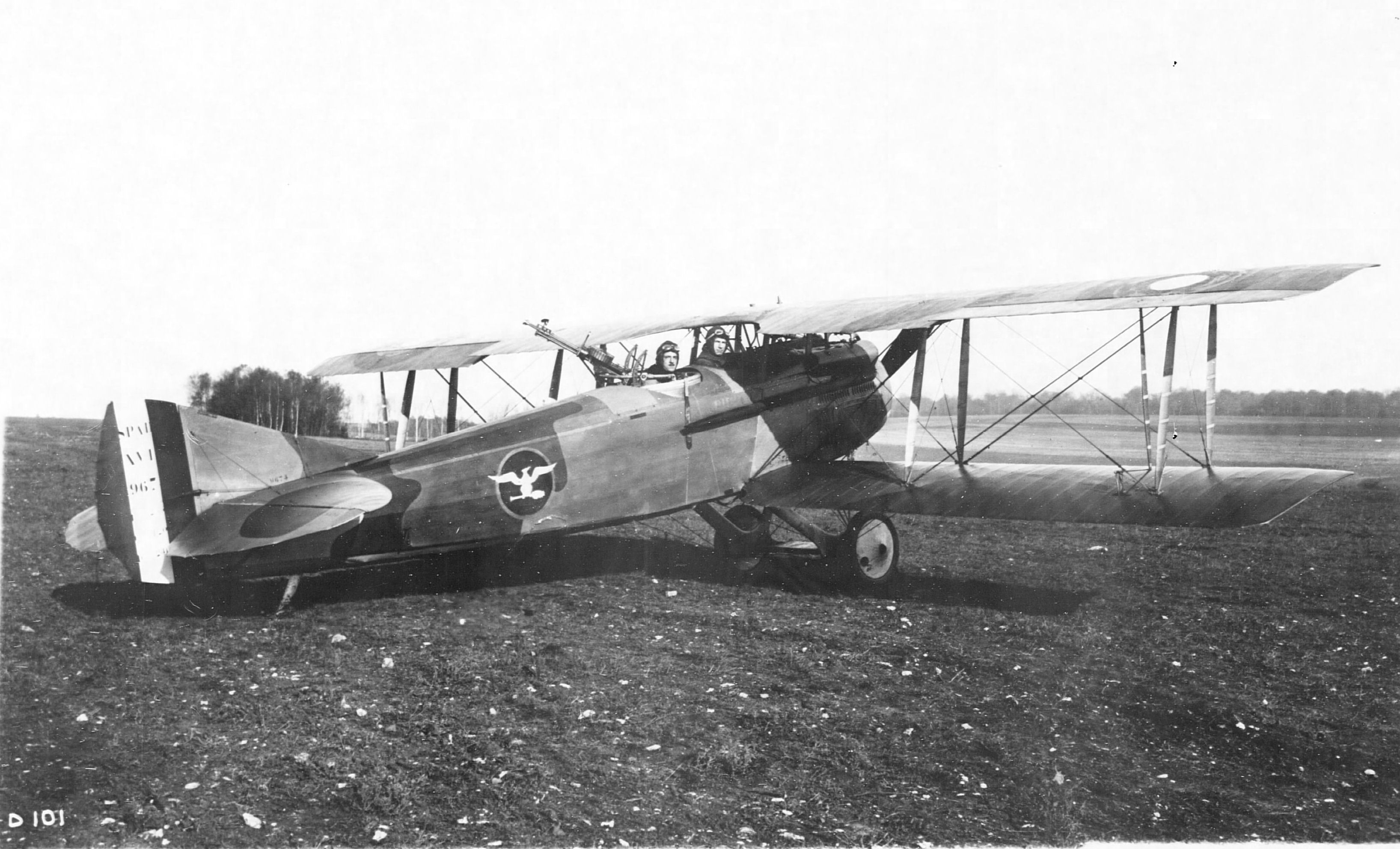
General Mitchell's Headquarters, Chief of Air Service, AEF Spad XVI

The airfield was maintained for use by Headquarters until June 1919, when the Air Service in France was ordered demobilized and was turned over to the 1st Air Depot for de-construction. All hangars and other structures were dismantled, and all useful supplies and equipment were removed and sent back to the Depot for storage. Upon completion, the land was turned over to the French government.

Eventually, the land was returned to agricultural use by local farmers. Today, it is a series of cultivated fields located on the south side of the Départmental 417 (D417), about four miles east-southeast of Chaumont, with no indications of its wartime use.

== See also ==
- List of Air Service American Expeditionary Force aerodromes in France
