= 7th Operations Group =

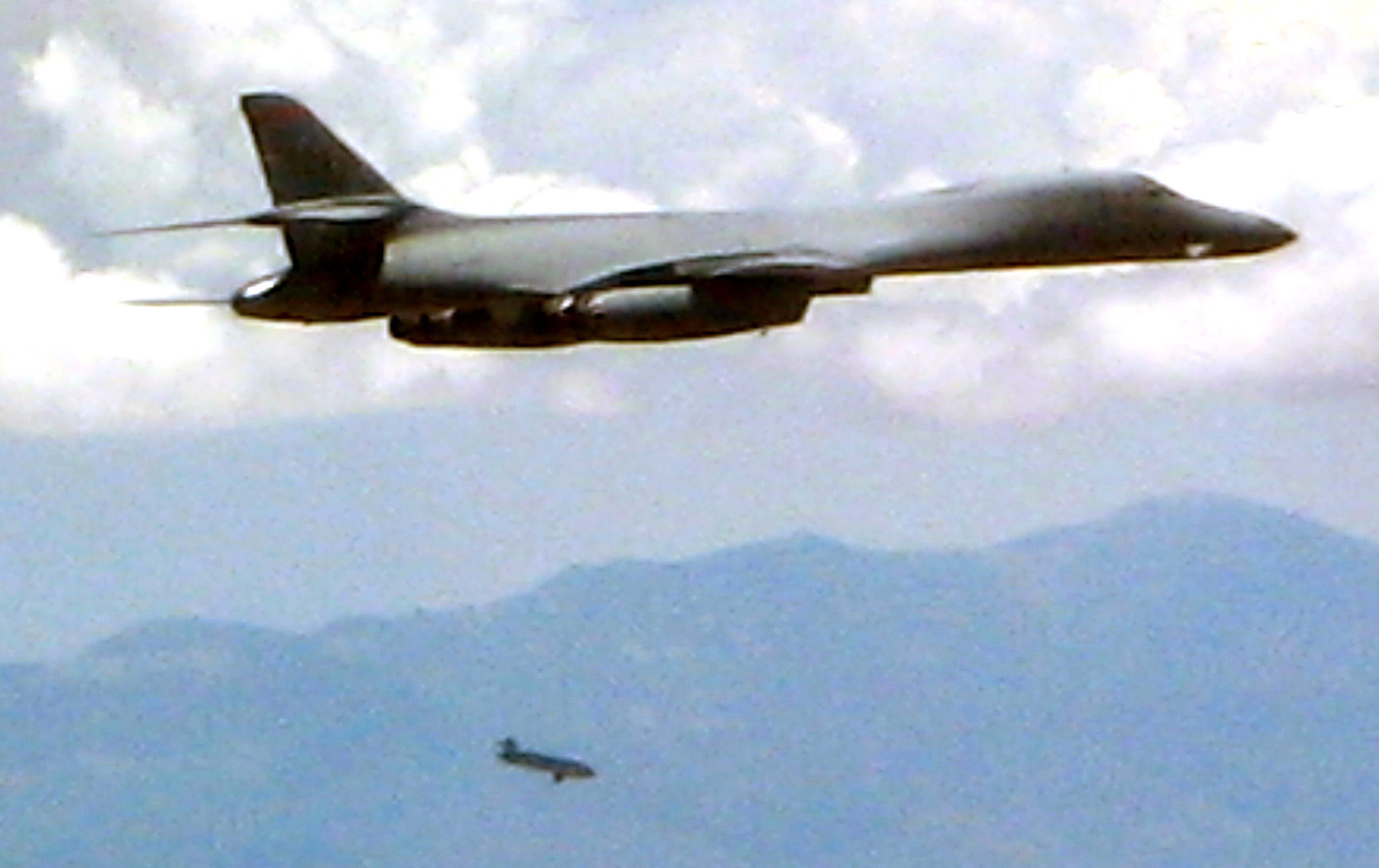
- A 7th Operations Group Rockwell B-1B Lancer releases a Joint Air-to-Surface Standoff Missile over the White Sands Missile Range, NM
- Active: 6 September 1918 – present (106 years, 4 months) Detailed: 1 October 1993 – present 29 August 1991 – 1 January 1993 (as 7th Operations Group) 20 July 1948 – 16 June 1952 (as 7th Bombardment Group, Heavy) 1 October 1946 – 20 July 1948 (as 7th Bombardment Group, Very Heavy) 15 October 1944 – 6 January 1946 (as 7th Bombardment Group, Heavy) 6 December 1939 – 15 October 1944 (as 7th Bombardment Group (Heavy)) 24 March 1923 – 6 December 1939 (as 7th Bombardment Group) 25 January 1923 – 24 March 1923 (as 7th Observation Group) 26 March 1921 – 30 August 1921 (as 7th Group (Observation)) 6 September 1918 – April 1919 (as 1st Army Observation Group)
- Country: United States
- Branch: United States Air Force (18 September 1947 – present); United States Army ( Army Air Forces, 20 June 1941 – 18 September 1947; Army Air Corps, 2 July 1926 – 20 June 1941; Army Air Service, 6 September 1918 – 2 July 1926)
- Part of: 7th Bomb Wing
- Garrison/HQ: Dyess Air Force Base, Texas.
- Motto: Mors Ab Alto Latin Death from Above
- Engagements: World War I: St. Mihiel; Meuse-Argonne; Lorraine; World War II – Asiatic-Pacific Theater: Burma; East Indies; India-Burma; China Defensive; Central Burma; China Offensive

- Decorations: Distinguished Unit Citation Air Force Outstanding Unit Award

Insignia
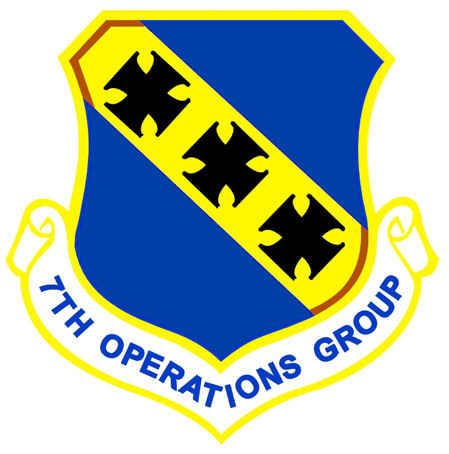
- 7th Operations Group emblem (Note: The group uses the 7th Wing emblem with the group designation on the scroll. Haulman, Factsheet, 7 Operations Group.)

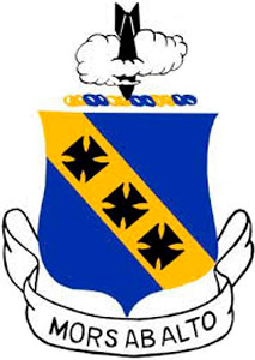
- 7th Bombardment Group emblem (approved 30 January 1933)
- Tail Code: DY

Aircraft flown
- Bomber: Rockwell B-1B Lancer

The 7th Operations Group is the operational flying component of the United States Air Force 7th Bomb Wing, stationed at Dyess Air Force Base, Texas. The 7th Operations Group currently flies the B-1 Lancer.

The 7th Operations Group is a direct successor organization of the 7th Bombardment Group, one of the 15 original combat air groups formed by the United States Army before World War II.

Activated in 1921, it inherited the lineage of the 1st Army Observation Group, which was established and organized, on 6 September 1918. The 7th Bombardment Group was deploying to the Philippines when the Imperial Japanese Navy Air Service attacked Pearl Harbor on 7 December 1941. Six of the group's B-17 Flying Fortress aircraft which had left Hamilton Field, California on 6 December 1941 reached Hawaii during the enemy attack, but were able to land safely. The unit later served in India during World War II.

In the postwar era, the 7d Bombardment Group was one of the first USAAF units assigned to the Strategic Air Command on 1 October 1946, prior to the establishment of the United States Air Force. Equipped with low-hour B-29 Superfortress surplus World War II aircraft, the group was inactivated in 1952 when the parent wing adopted the Tri-Deputate organization and assigned all of the group's squadrons directly to the wing.

Reactivated as the 7th Operations Group in 1991 when the 7th Bomb Wing adopted the USAF Objective organization plan.

== Assigned Units ==
The 7 OG (Tail Code: DY) consists of the following units:

- 7th Operations Support Squadron
- 9th Bomb Squadron
- 28th Bomb Squadron
- 436th Training Squadron

Both the 9th and 28th Bomb Squadrons fought in combat on the Western Front of World War I, and histories predate that of the Operations Group.

== Heraldry ==
The group's emblem, approved in 1933, features three crosses symbolizing its squadrons' battle honors. The diagonal stripe was taken from the coat of arms of province of Lorraine which France took back from Germany in World War I.

== History ==
For additional history and lineage, see 7th Bomb Wing

=== World War I ===
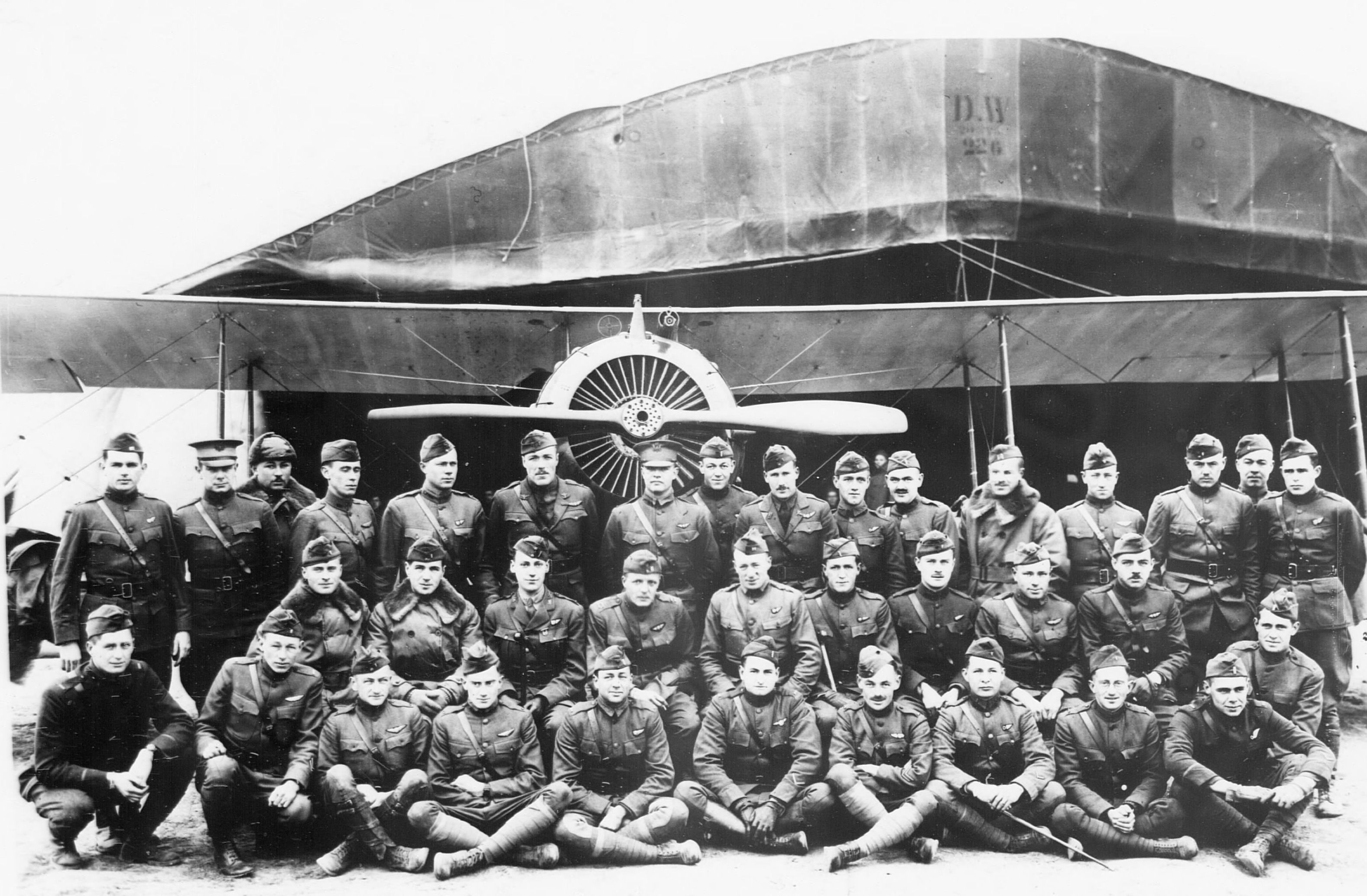
Men of the 24th Aero Squadron pose in front of a Salmson 2.A2, Vavincourt Aerodrome, France, November 1918

In the summer of 1918 and the organization of the United States First Army in France, the First Army Observation Group was organized at Gondreville-sur-Moselle Aerodrome on 6 September. The group initially consisted of the 91st and 24th Aero Squadrons, which flew over the front into enemy territory. Aircraft from the group took numerous air photos and compiled maps of enemy troop concentrations, road convoys, railway traffic, artillery and other targets during the Battle of Saint-Mihiel in mid-September.

On 22 September, the group changed stations, moving to Vavincourt Aerodrome. At Vavincourt, the 9th Aero Squadron (Night Observation) was assigned to the unit. With the addition of the 9th, both day and night patrols were made over enemy territory, with intelligence being returned to First Army headquarters. The duties of the group consisted of long-distance patrols far into the enemy rear areas, both visual and photographic. Special attention was paid to enemy movements on roads, canals and railways. Railway stations and marshalling yards were noted, along with supply depots, airfields and munition storage areas. Once located, they were kept under routine observation. Also, the locations of enemy heavy artillery batteries were monitored and their movements recorded.

The First Army OG flew no less than 521 successful missions, with a total of 1,271 sorties being made. Daily battles with enemy aircraft were engaged, with the group shooting down 50 aircraft in 111 aerial combats. With the Armistice with Germany being reached on 11 November 1918, the group ceased flying into enemy territory, but maintained an alert for several weeks afterward.

=== Between the wars ===
After World War I, the Army Air Service was re-organized on a permanent basis. The 1st Army Observation Group was organized at Park Field, Memphis, Tennessee on 1 October 1919. It was transferred to Langley Field, Virginia and was assigned the 1st, 12th and 88th Aero Squadrons, equipped with surplus de Havilland DH-4s. On 14 March 1921, with the formation of the United States Army Air Service, it was re-designated as the 7th Observation Group. It was inactivated due to funding issues on 30 August 1921.

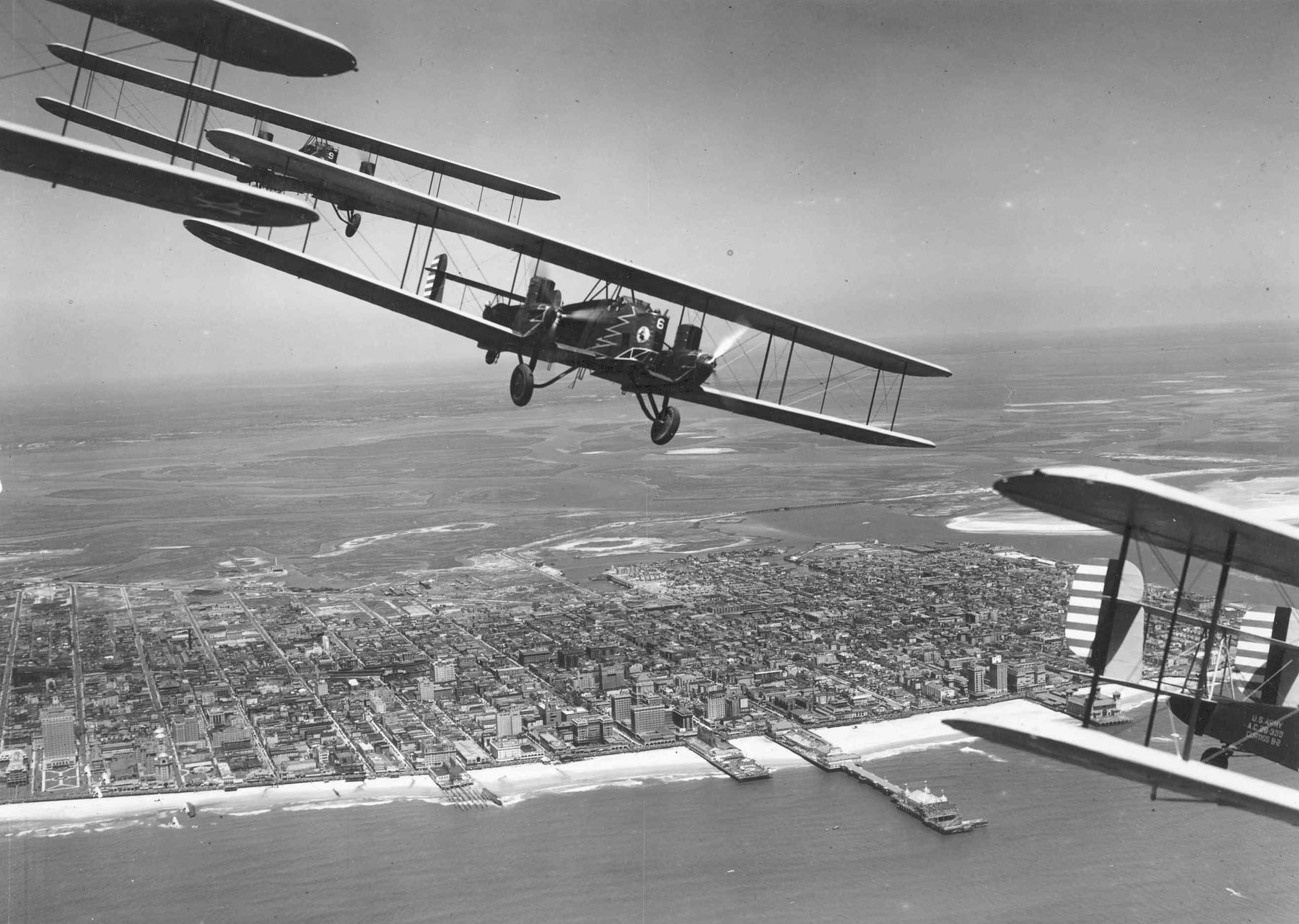
Curtiss B-2 Condor formation flight over Atlantic City, N.J. S/N 28-399 is in the foreground (tail section only). Aircraft were assigned to 11th Bombardment Squadron, 7th Bombardment Group at Rockwell Field, California. This flight of 4 aircraft completed cross-country flight to Atlantic City, NJ.

The group was re-formed at Rockwell Field, San Diego, California and activated on 1 June 1928. The re-formed Group was assigned the 9th, 11th, 22d and 31st Bombardment Squadrons. The 9th, 11th and 31st squadrons lent their World War I lineage to the group's emblem as indicated by the three Maltese Crosses on the shield. While the group was assigned at Rockwell Field, the fledgling Air Force was testing new theories and ideas. In early 1931, the 7th began training aircrews in radio-controlled interception. A bomber, acting as a target, reported by radio to a ground station, giving location, altitude and course. Armed with this information, ground controllers guided pursuit aircraft to the objective.

The 7th was transferred to March Field, Riverside California, on 29 October 1931 with its 11th Squadron joining the 9th and 31st Bombardment Squadrons which had been activated on 1 April 1931, but had not been manned. The Curtiss B-2 Condor was flown by the 11th; the 9th flew the Keystone B-4; while the 31st flew 0-35s, B-1s, and B-7s. A sprinkling of other aircraft types from the era was also found among the squadrons.

The 7th trained and participated in aerial reviews, assisted in atmospheric experiments, dropped food and medical supplies to people marooned or lost, and took part in massive Army maneuvers during the 1930s flying Curtiss and Keystone biplane bombers, then Martin B-12s,

For 102 days in 1934 the Army Air Corps flew domestic air mail routes, assigned to the job by an executive order from the White House. This followed a year long investigation that alleged fraud and collusion among the dozen or so airlines who hauled the mail for a subsidy of fifty four cents per mile flown.

Following the closure of Rockwell Field in San Diego, the 7th had to make room at March for the 19th Bomb Group. Overcrowding at March and the opening of the new Hamilton Field near San Francisco led the group to be transferred on 22 May 1937 and equipped with B-18 Bolos. Equipped with the new B-17C in 1939, runway issues at Hamilton Field forced a transfer to Fort Douglas/Salt Lake City Municipal Airport, Utah on 1 September 1940 which could better handle the large, heavy bombers. In Utah, the group was re-equipped with the B-17E – the first Fortress to introduce a completely new rear fuselage with a manually operated turret housing two 0.50-inch machine guns fitted in the extreme tail.

With the crisis in the Pacific in late 1941, ground elements departed from Fort Douglas 13 November 1941 and sailed from the port of San Francisco on 21 November on an army transport en route to the Philippines. Aircraft and crews began departing Muroc Field, CA, on 6 December en route to Hawaii. Elements of the group flew their B-17s into Hickam Field at the height of the Japanese attack on Pearl Harbor.

=== World War II ===
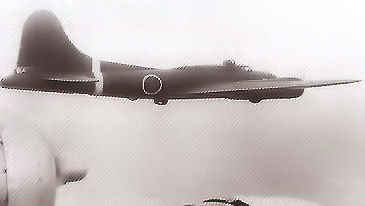
A captured B-17E (AAF Ser. No. 41-2471) of the 7th Bomb Group in Japanese service, 1942. The aircraft crash landed on 8 February 1942 at Yogyakarta, Java and was abandoned. It was repaired by the Japanese and used for training to develop fighter tactics against the B-17. The eventual fate of this aircraft is unknown.

The group was in the process of moving to the Philippines when the Japanese attacked Pearl Harbor on 7 December 1941. Six of the Group's B-17 aircraft left Utah on 5 December for deployment to the Far East. Six of them arrived in Hawaii but landed safely at alternate airfields, avoiding destruction by the attacking Japanese aircraft. The rest of them were ordered to defend California against the Japanese threat, since in the hysteria of the moment the Japanese fleet was expected to show up off the Pacific Coast at any time.

The ground echelon, on board a ship in the Pacific Ocean, was diverted to Brisbane, Australia. The air echelon moved its B-17Es via North Africa and India to Java, where from 14 January to 1 March 1942, it operated against the Japanese advancing through the Philippines and Netherlands East Indies. Received the Distinguished Unit Citation (DUC) for its action against enemy aircraft, ground installations, warships and transports.

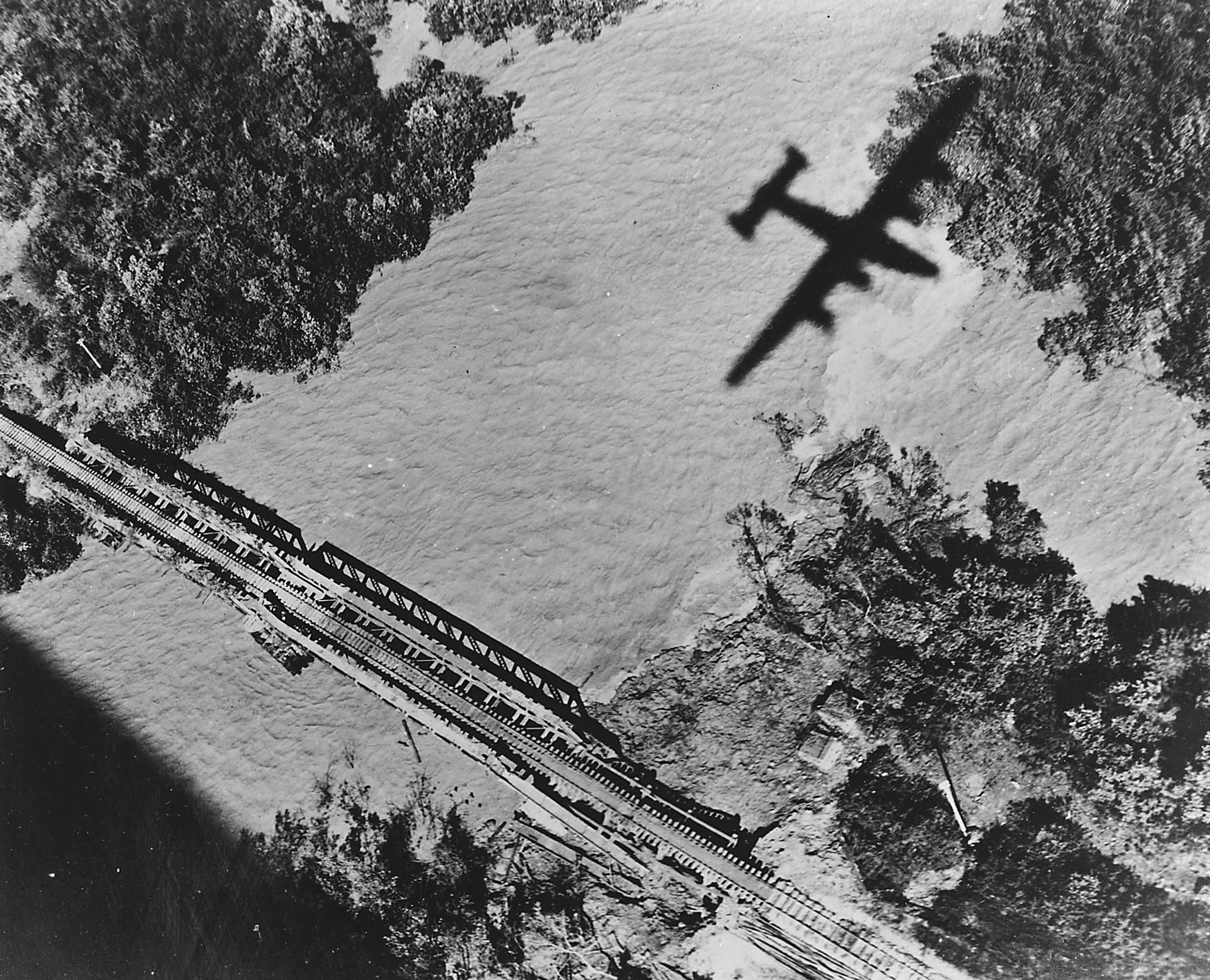
7th BG B-24s attacking the Moulmein-Ye rail line, Burma, 1945.

The group's B-17Es were distributed to other bomb squadrons in Australia, and the air echelon was reunited with the ground echelon in India in March 1942, being equipped with longer-range B-24 Liberators. From bases in India, the group resumed combat under Tenth Air Force against targets in Burma. It received B-25 Mitchells and LB-30s in early 1942 but by the end of the year had converted entirely to B-24s. From then through September 1945, bombed airfields, fuel and supply dumps, locomotive works, railways, bridges, docks, warehouses, shipping, and troop concentrations in Burma and struck oil refineries in Thailand, power plants in China and enemy shipping in the Andaman Sea. Ceased bombing operations in late May 1945 and was attached to the Air Transport Command to haul gasoline over "The Hump" from India to China. Received second DUC for damaging enemy's line of supply in Southeast Asia with an attack against rail lines and bridges in Thailand on 19 March 1945. Returned to US in December 1945 and inactivated the following month.

=== Cold War ===
Activated on 1 October 1946 as a B-29 bombardment group and trained with B-29s in global bombardment operations, November 1947 – December 1948. Personnel and aircraft of the new group, consisting of the Boeing B-29 Superfortress, were transferred to Fort Worth Army Airfield (renamed Carswell Air Force Base on 29 January 1948) from the 92nd Bombardment Group at Spokane AAFld, Washington.

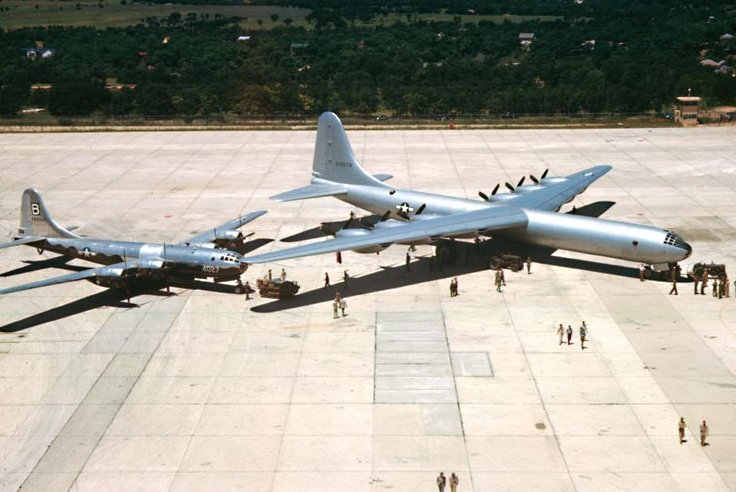
Arrival of the first B-36A at Carswell "City of Fort Worth" (AF Serial No. 44-92015), in June 1948 along with a 7th Bomb Wing B-29.

With its B-29s, the 7th prepared its people for any combat eventuality that might arise, flying simulated bombing missions over various cities. On 5 July 1947, a flight of eight B-29s of the 492nd Bomb Squadron deployed from Fort Worth AAF to Yokota AB, Japan. Shortly after this the detachment received orders to redeploy to Fort Worth AAF via Washington, D.C. The aircraft left Yokota AB on 2 August, flew over the Aleutian Islands, then into Anchorage, Alaska. From Anchorage the flight flew over Edmonton, Alberta, Canada, turned south and flew over Minnesota and Wisconsin. The bombers flew a low-level flight between The Pentagon and Washington Monument in the Capitol on 3 August. Completing this aerial demonstration, they headed for Fort Worth, landing 31 hours after launch from Japan and covering 7,086 miles.

On 12 September, the group deployed 30 B-29s to Giebelstadt Army Airfield, near Würzburg, West Germany. This flight was the largest bomber formation flown from Fort Worth AAF overseas to date, landing in Germany on 13 September. During their ten-day stay, the group bombers participated in training operations over Europe, as well as a show-of-force display by the United States in the early part of the Cold War with the Soviet Union. The flight redeployed from Germany on 23 September.

On 17 November 1947, the 7th Bombardment Wing was established to organize and train a force capable of immediate and sustained long range offensive warfare and operations in any part of the world. The 7th Bombardment Group became its operational component. The wing's mission was to prepare for global strategic bombardment in the event of hostilities. Under various designations, the 7th Bomb Wing flew a wide variety of aircraft at the base until its inactivation in 1993.

In June 1948 the first Consolidated B-36A Peacekeeper was delivered. The first B-36 was designated the "City of Fort Worth" (AF Serial No. 44-92015), and was assigned to the 492d Bomb Squadron. With the arrival of the B-36s, the wing was redesignated as the 7th Bombardment Wing, Heavy on 1 August. B-36s continued to arrive throughout 1948, with the last B-29 being transferred on 6 December to the 97th Bomb Group at Biggs AFB. For 10 years, the "Peacemaker" cast a large shadow on the Iron Curtain and served as our nations major deterrent weapons system.

As part of the 7th Bomb Wing, the 11th Bomb Group was activated on 1 December with the 26th, 42nd, and 98th Bomb Squadrons, Heavy, were activated and assigned. The 11th Bomb Group was equipped with B-36As for training purposes. A five ship B-36 formation was flown on 15 January 1949, in an air review over Washington, D.C., commemorating the inauguration of the President of the United States, Harry S. Truman.

In February 1949, a B-50 Superfortress (developed from the famed B-29) and named Lucky Lady II took off from Carswell Air Force Base for the first nonstop flight around the world. She returned to Carswell after mid-air refueling, flying 23,108 miles, and remaining aloft for ninety-four hours and one minute.

In January 1951, the 7th took part in a special training mission to the United Kingdom. The purpose of the mission was to evaluate the B-36D under simulated war plan conditions. Also, further evaluate the equivalent airspeed and compression tactics for heavy bombardment aircraft. The aircraft, staging through Limestone AFB, Maine, would land at RAF Lakenheath, United Kingdom, following a night radar bombing attack on Helgoland, West Germany. From there the bombers would conduct a simulated bomb run on the Heston Bomb Plot, London, finally landing at RAF Lakenheath.

This was the first deployment of wing and SAC B-36 aircraft to England and Europe. For the next four days the flight flew sorties out of England. The aircraft redeployed to the states on 20 January arriving at Carswell on 21 January.

On 16 February 1951 became a paper organization. With all assigned flying squadrons reassigned directly to the 7 Bombardment Wing as part of the Tri-Deputate organization plan adopted by the wing. The group inactivated on 16 June 1952.

=== Post 1992 ===
As part of a major Air Force-wide reorganization due to the implementation of the Objective Wing organization, the Group was redesignated 7th Operations Group and again became the combat element of the 7th Wing. It controlled two B-52 squadrons and one KC-135 air refueling squadron. When flying operations ended at Carswell AFB, TX in December 1992, the group inactivated the following month.

Upon activation of the 7th Wing at Dyess AFB, TX on 1 October 1993, the group again activated as the combat element of the wing. Equipped with B-1B and C-130 aircraft, the group's mission included bombardment and tactical airlift. It lost its airlift responsibilities in April 1997. At that time it also gained a conventional bombing mission. In November 1998, deployed several aircraft to Oman in support of Operation Desert Fox, where the B-1 flew its first combat missions on 17 and 18 December 1998.

Since 1999, trained bomber aircrews for global conventional bombing.

=== Lineage ===
- Organized in France as: First Army Observation Group, 6 September 1918

Demobilized in France, 15 April 1919

- Organized as: 1st Army Observation Group, 1 October 1919

Re-designated: 7th Group (Observation), 14 March 1921
Inactivated 30 August 1921
Re-designated: 7th Observation Group on 25 January 1923
Re-designated: 7th Bombardment Group on 24 March 1923

- Activated on 1 June 1928

Re-designated: 7th Bombardment Group (Heavy) on 6 December 1939
Re-designated: 7th Bombardment Group, Heavy on 15 October 1944
Inactivated on 6 January 1946

- Re-designated 7th Bombardment Group, Very Heavy on 1 October 1946

Organized and activated, on 1 October 1946
Re-designated 7th Bombardment Group, Heavy on 20 July 1948
Inactivated on 16 June 1952

- Re-designated 7th Operations Group on 29 August 1991

Activated on 1 September 1991
Inactivated on 1 January 1993

- Activated on 1 October 1993
- Consolidated with the First Army Observation Group, 13 January 1994
- Consolidated unit reconstituted as 7th Operations Group, 13 January 1994

=== Assignments ===
- First Army Air Service, 6 September 1918 – 15 April 1919
- 2d Wing, 1 October 1919 – 30 August 1921
- Ninth Corps Area, 1 June 1928
- 1st Bombardment Wing, c. 30 October 1931
- IX Corps Area, c. 1 October 1933
- 1st Wing, 1 March 1935
- 20th Bombardment Wing, 18 December 1940
- II Bomber Command, 5 September 1941
- V Bomber Command, c. 22 December 1941
- Tenth Air Force, March 1942
- Army Air Forces, India-Burma Theater, 12 June-c. 7 December 1945

Attached to India China Division, Air Transport Command, 15 June – 18 September 1945

- New York Port of Embarkation, 5–6 January 1946
- Fifteenth Air Force, 1 October 1946
- Eighth Air Force, 1 November 1946
- 7th Bombardment Wing, 17 November 1947 – 16 June 1952
- 7th (later, 7th Bomb) Wing, 1 September 1991 – 1 January 1993; 1 October 1993–present

=== Components ===
Squadrons
World War I

- 9th Aero Squadron (later 9th Bombardment Squadron, 9th Bomb Squadron): September – November 1918; 1 April 1931 – 6 January 1946 (detached 28 June-c. 4 October 1942); 1 October 1946 – 16 June 1952 (attached to 7th Bombardment Wing 16 February 1951 – 16 June 1952); 1 September 1991 – 15 August 1992; 1 October 1993 – present
- 24th Aero Squadron (Observation), September 1918 – April 1919
- 91st Aero Squadron (Observation), September – November 1918
- 186th Aero Squadron (Observation), 5 – 11 November 1918

Interwar Period

- 1st Aero Squadron (later 1st Squadron) : 1 October 1919 – 30 August 1921 (detached 6 May – 30 August 1921)
- 11th Bombardment Squadron: 1 June 1928 – 15 September 1942 (detached 26 April – 2 May 1942)
- 12th Aero Squadron (later 12th Squadron): 1 October 1919 – 24 March 1920 (detached after 13 October 1919)
- 31st Bombardment Squadron: attached 1 April −29 June 1931, assigned 30 June 1931 – 1 February 1938
- 50th Aero Squadron: attached c. October 1919–23 March 1920, assigned 24 March 1920 – 10 February 1921
- 95th Pursuit Squadron: attached 1 June 1928 – 29 October 1931
- 88th Aero Squadron (later 88th Reconnaissance Squadron, 436th Bombardment Squadron, 436th Training Squadron): attached c. October 1919 – 23 March 1920, assigned 24 March 1920 – 10 February 1921; attached 28 September 1935 – 24 February 1942 (air echelon detached 10 December 1941 – 14 March 1942), assigned 25 February 1942 – 6 January 1946; assigned 1 October 1946 – 16 June 1952 (detached 16 February 1951 – 16 June 1952), assigned xx XXX xxxx to present.

World War II

- 14th Bombardment Squadron: 2 December 1941-2 Apr 1942 (attached to 19th Bombardment Group, 2-c. 24 Dec 1941; air echelon attached to 19th Bombardment Group, c. 24 Dec 1941-14 March 1942; ground echelon attached to the 5th Interceptor Command, c. 24 December 1941-May 1942)
- 22d Bombardment Squadron: 20 October 1939 – 15 September 1942 (detached 26 April – 28 May 1942)
- 32d Bombardment Squadron: apparently attached c. 8 – 16 December 1941
- 492d Bombardment Squadron: 25 October 1942 – 6 January 1946; 1 October 1946 – 16 June 1952 (detached 16 February 1951 – 16 June 1952)
- 493d Bombardment Squadron: 25 October 1942 – 6 January 1946.

United States Air Force

- 7th Air Refueling Squadron: 1 September 1991 – 1 June 1992
- 13th Bomb Squadron: 14 June 2000 – 9 September 2005
- 20th Bomb Squadron: 1 September 1991 – 18 December 1992
- 28th Bomb Squadron: 1 October 1994–present
- 39th Airlift Squadron: 1 October 1993 – 1 April 1997
- 40th Airlift Squadron: 1 October 1993 – 1 April 1997
- 337th Bomb Squadron: 1 October 1993 – 1 October 1994

Other

- Photographic Section No. 1, November 1918 – April 1919

=== Stations ===
- Gondreville-sur-Moselle Aerodrome, France, 6 September 1918
- Vavincourt Aerodrome, France, 22 September 1918 – April 1919
- Park Field, Tennessee, 1 October 1919
- Langley Field, Virginia, 28 October 1919 – 30 August 1921
- Rockwell Field, California, 1 June 1928
- March Field, California, 30 October 1931
- Hamilton Field, California, 5 December 1934
- March Field, California, 5 November 1935
- Hamilton Field, California, 22 May 1937
- Fort Douglas, Utah, 7 September 1940 – 13 November 1941

9th Bombardment and 88th Reconnaissance Squadrons deploying to Clark Field, Philippines on 6 December 1941 delayed en route by Japanese Attack on Hickam Field, Hawaii. 9th Bombardment Squadron returned to United States after attack for defense of west coast. 88th Reconnaissance Squadron moved from Hickam Field to Karachi Airport, India via Nandi Airport, Fiji Islands and RAAF Base Townsville, Australia

- Archerfield Airport (Brisbane), Australia, 22 December 1941 – 4 February 1942 (Ground Echelon)

9th & 11th Bomb Squadrons operated from: Jogjakarta Airfield Java, 14 January – 1 March 1942

- Karachi Airport, India, 12 March 1942
- Dum Dum Airfield, India, 30 May 1942
- Karachi Airport, India, 9 September 1942
- Pandaveswar Airfield, India, 12 December 1942
- Kurmitola Airfield, India, 17 January 1944
- Pandaveswar Airfield, India, 6 October 1944
- Tezpur Airfield, India, 7 June 1945
- Dudhkundi Airfield, India, 31 October – 7 December 1945
- Camp Kilmer, New Jersey, 5–6 January 1946
- Fort Worth AAFld, Texas (later renamed Carswell AFB), 1 October 1946 – 16 June 1952; 1 September 1991 – 1 January 1993
- Dyess AFB, Texas, 1 October 1993–present

=== Aircraft ===
- Breguet 14, DH-4, Salmson 2 in addition to Spad XIII and Sopwith FE-2, 1918–1919
- Loening OA-2, 1928-unknown
- LB-7, 1929-unknown
- B-3, B-4, O-19, O-38, 1931–1934
- B-12, 1934–1936
- Martin B-10, 1936–1937
- B-18 Bolo, 1937–1941
- B-17 Flying Fortress, 1939–1942
- B-25 Mitchell, 1942
- B-24 Liberator, LB-30, 1942–1945
- B-29 Superfortress, 1946–1948
- Convair B-36, 1948–1958
- Convair XC-99, 1949
- B-52F Stratofotress 1957–1969
- B-52D Stratofortress1969–1983
- B-52H Stratofortress, 1983–1993
- KC-135A Stratotanker, 1960–1993
- B-1B Lancer, 1985–present 96th BW and later 7th BW)
- C-130 Hercules, 1993–1997

== See also ==
- Meuse-Argonne Offensive, 26 September – 11 November 1918
- Organization of the Air Service of the American Expeditionary Force
- St Mihel Offensive, 12–16 September 1918
- Strategic Air Command
- United States Army Air Forces in Australia
