= RAF Sedgeford =

Former RAF Station in Norfolk, England

RAF Sedgeford
- Sedgeford, Norfolk in England

Site information
- Owner: Air Ministry
- Operator: Royal Navy; Royal Flying Corps; Royal Air Force

Location
- Shown within Norfolk
- Coordinates: 52.90010°N 0.54290°E

Site history
- Built: 1915
- In use: 1915–1919; 1940–1942

Airfield information
Runways
Direction	Length and surface
	Grass field

RAF Sedgeford was a Royal Air Force airfield, located approximately 15 miles north-northeast of King's Lynn, in the county of Norfolk, East Anglia.

== History ==
RAF Sedgeford was used as an airfield in the First World War, as a satellite airfield (officially called "Night Landing Grounds") of RAF Great Yarmouth.

=== First World War ===
During the First World War, the airfield was used for home defence duties, and was initially attached to the Royal Navy. By 1916, the Royal Flying Corps, a precursor to the current Royal Air Force, took over the facilities.

After the conclusion of the war, RAF Sedgeford was abandoned around 1919 to 1920.

Units

- No. 3 Fighting School RAF between 21 September 1918 and 14 March 1919, became No. 7 Training Squadron RAF, disbanded during October 1919.
- No. 9 Training Squadron RAF between 10 January and August 1918
- No. 13 Squadron RAF between 27 March and 31 December 1919 when the squadron was disbanded.
- 24th Aero Squadron during 1918
- No. 45 Squadron RFC between 21 May and 12 October 1916 with the Martinsyde S.1, Royal Aircraft Factory B.E.2C, Bristol Scout, Royal Aircraft Factory F.E.2B, Henry Farman F.20 & Sopwith 1½ Strutter.
- No. 53 Reserve Squadron RFC formed here on 1 February 1917, staying until 14 February 1917.
- No. 64 Squadron RFC formed here on 1 August 1916, staying until 14 October 1917. It operated the F.20, B.E.2C, F.E.2B, Sopwith Pup, Avro 504 & Airco DH.5
- No. 65 Reserve Squadron RFC between 10 and 31 May 1917 became No. 65 Training Squadron RFC between 31 May and 25 November 1917
- No. 72 Squadron RFC between 1 November and 25 December 1917 with the 504 and Pup
- No. 87 Squadron RFC between 15 September and 19 December 1917 with various aircraft
- No. 110 Squadron RAF between 26 November 1917 and 15 June 1918 with various aircraft
- No. 122 Squadron RAF formed here on 1 January 1918, operated various aircraft and was disbanded here on 17 August 1918

=== Second World War ===
RAF Sedgeford was reused during the Second World War, when it was classified as a 'Q-type' and 'K-type' bombing decoy.

The buildings and hangars on site made it a dummy airfield, which prevented nearby, functional airfields from being bombed by enemy bombers. At night, the airfield was lit up to look like an active airfield in order to trick the enemy.

Official records recorded RAF Sedgeford to be in operation from June 1940 to August 1942.

== Present state ==
Smaller buildings, dating back to the First World War, survive, as does an air raid shelter that was built during the Second World War.

== See also ==
- List of former Royal Air Force stations
