= Leonard Coombes Hammond =

- Born: 11 November 1884; Missoula, Montana, United States
- Died: 20 December 1945 (aged 61); San Francisco, California, USA
- Military career
- Allegiance: United States
- Branch: United States Army Ambulance Service; Air Service, United States Army
- Service years: 1915 - 1919
- Rank: Captain
- Unit: Norton-Harjes Ambulance Corps; Air Service, United States Army: 91st Aero Squadron
- Conflicts: World War I
- Awards: Distinguished Service Cross

Captain Leonard Coombes Hammond was a World War I flying ace credited with six aerial victories.

== Biography ==
He was the son of A.B. Hammond and Florence Abbott. Hammond was born in Missoula, Montana. He attended Harvard in 1901 and 1902. From November 1915 until November 1916 he was a driver in the Norton-Harjes Ambulance Corps on the Western Front. Upon his return to San Francisco, he entered officer's training at the Presidio in May 1917 and was commissioned 1st Lieutenant on 15 August 1917.

After entering the Air Service he was trained as an observer/gunner and deployed to France. Assigned to the 91st Observation Squadron, he was credited with six official victories with his flexible Lewis machine gun, all shared with various pilots flying the French Salmson 2A2. For his valor in combat, he was awarded the Distinguished Flying Cross.

Hammond returned to the United States on 14 January 1919 and was discharged from the army 18 February 1919. The 1940 census states he was president of a lumber and shipping company in San Francisco. He died on 20 December 1945 in San Francisco.

== See also ==
- List of World War I flying aces from the United States
