= Vavincourt Aerodrome =

- Part of American Expeditionary Forces (AEF)
- Located near: Bar-le-Duc, France
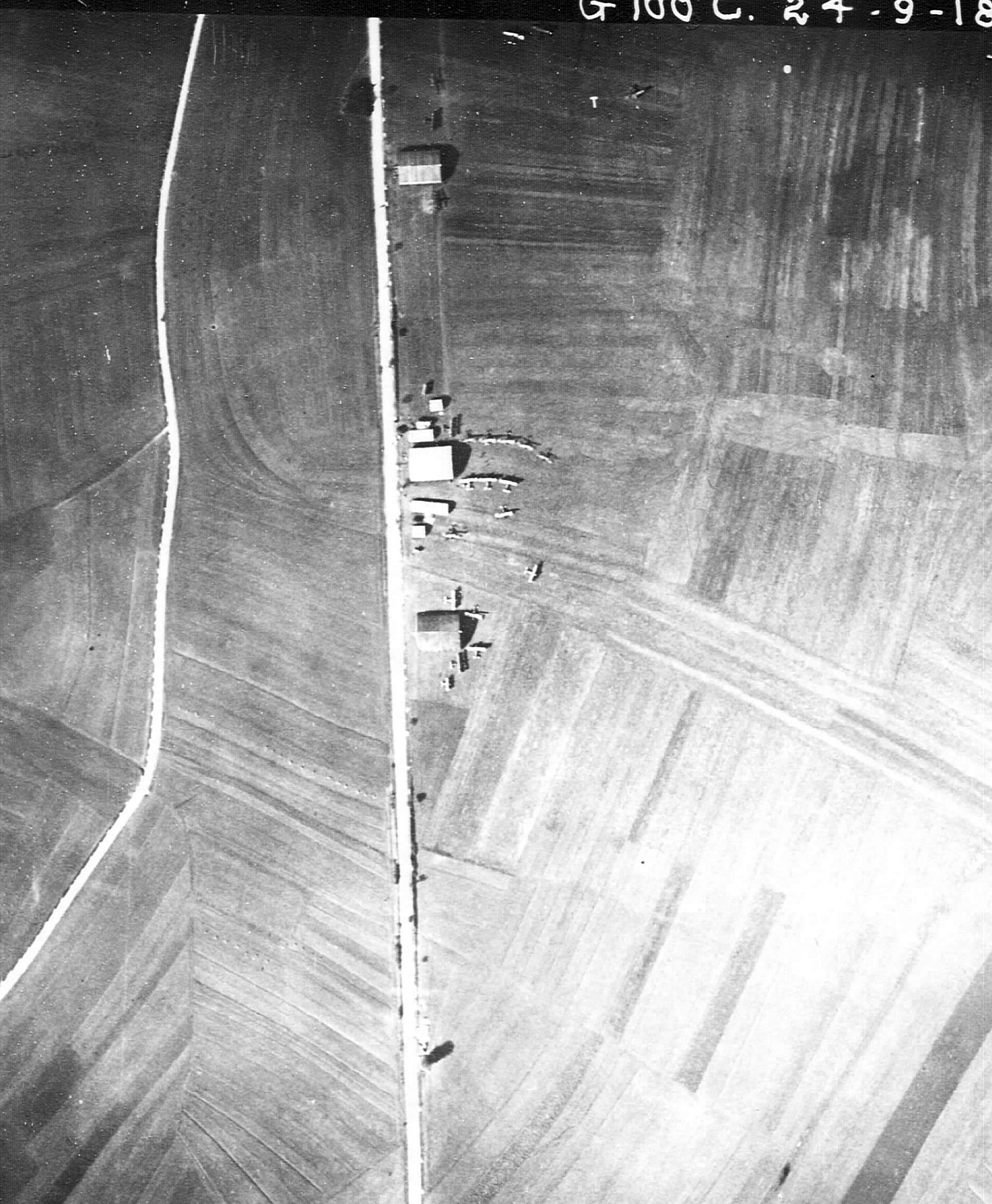
- Vavincourt Aerodrome, France, 23 September 1918

Site information
- Type: Combat Airfield
- Controlled by: Air Service, United States Army
- Condition: Agricultural area

Location
- Coordinates: 48°48′56″N 005°12′44″E

Site history
- Built: 1918
- In use: 1918–1919
- Battles/wars: World War I

Garrison information
- Garrison: First Army Observation Group; United States First Army Air Service

Vavincourt Aerodrome, was a temporary World War I airfield in France, used by the Air Service, United States Army. It was located 5 miles (8.0 km) north-northeast of Bar-le-Duc, in the Meuse department in north-eastern France.

== Overview ==
The airfield was built during the summer of 1918 by the French troops with an approximate area of 498,000 square meters, as an airfield and as an Advanced Air Service Depot to Colombey les Belles Main Depot. It was completed on 30 October 1918 having a capacity for 45 officers and 300 enlisted men with 7 barracks. It was able to accommodate 63 aircraft in 9 hangars.

The 86th Aero Squadron (Depot) spent two weeks here, 4–18 September 1918, before moving two miles down the road to Behonne, another sub-depot to Colombey.

Vavincourt Aerodrome was used by the 1st Army Observation Group from 22 September 1918, during both the St. Mihiel and Meuse-Argonne Offensives, with its three squadrons of aircraft.

In support of the flying squadrons, the 3d Air Park had a flight of mechanics for repair of both aircraft and vehicles. Also, the airfield was the home of Photo Sections #2 and #10 for processing and analyzing aerial photography. The ground support station consisted of various aircraft hangars, support buildings and quarters for personnel.

After the armistice in November 1918, Vavincourt remained active as 1st Army Observation Group HQ stayed here until it was disbanded on 15 April 1919. This time, the 24th Aero Squadron alone was still present.

Once empty, the airfield was turned over to the 1st Air Depot for de-construction: all hangars and other structures were dismantled and all useful supplies and equipment were removed and sent back to the Depot for storage. Upon completion, the land turned over to the French government.

Eventually, the land was returned to agricultural use by the local farmers. Today, what was Vavincourt Aerodrome is a series of cultivated fields located south of Vavincourt. The airfield was located to the east side of the D 28, south of the village of Vavincourt, as seen on the pictures above, with no indications of its wartime use.

== Known units assigned ==
- Headquarters, 1st Army Observation Group, 22 September – 11 November 1918
- 24th Aero Squadron (Observation) 22 September 1918 – 15 April 1919
- 91st Aero Squadron (Observation) 21 September 1918 – 21 November 1918
- 9th Aero Squadron (Night Observation) 21 September – 21 November 1918

== See also ==
- List of Air Service American Expeditionary Force aerodromes in France
