= 24th Aero Squadron =

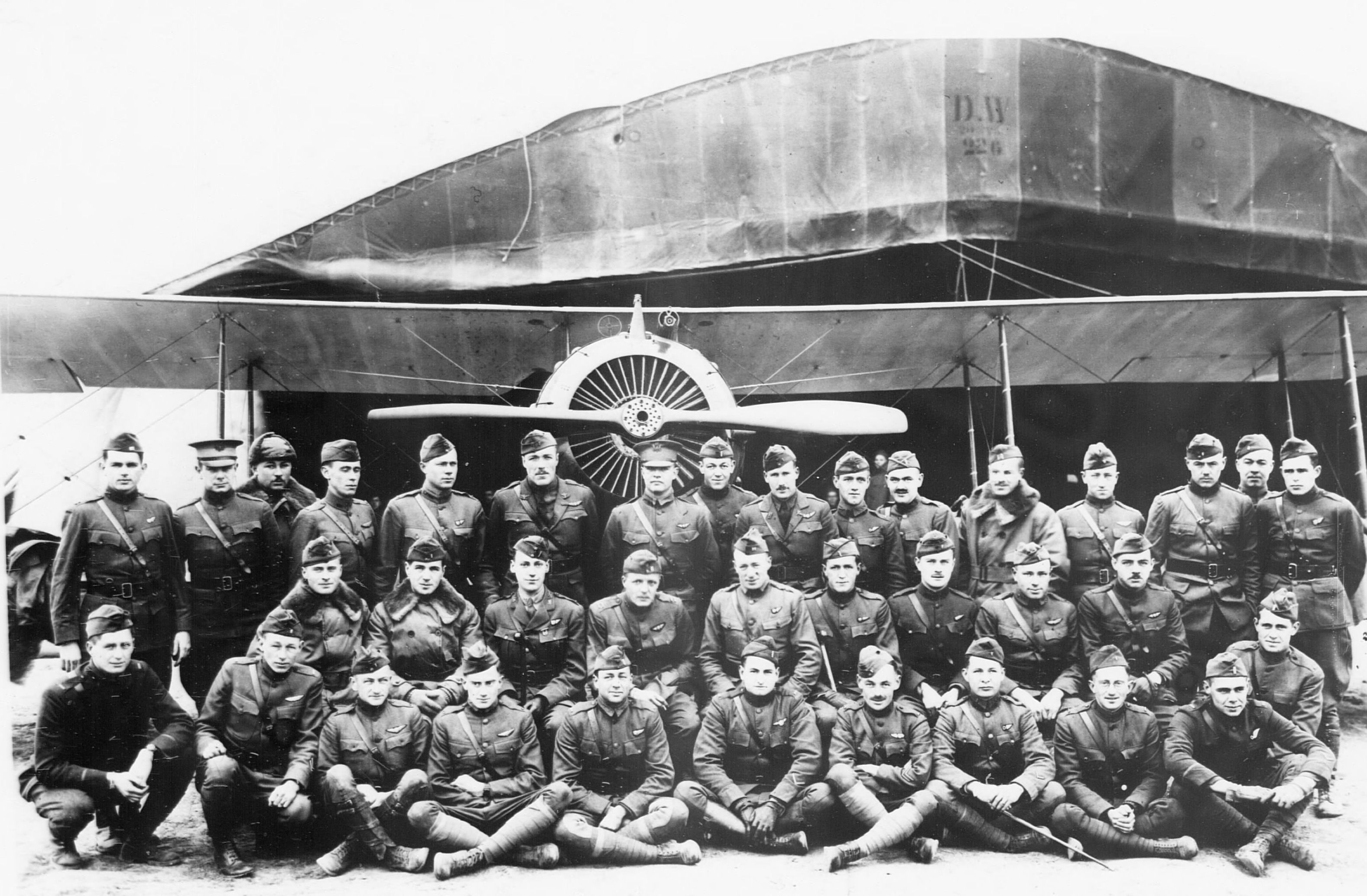
- 24th Aero Squadron, Vavincourt Aerodrome, France, November 1918
- Active: 1 May 1917 – 1 October 1919
- Country: United States
- Branch: United States Army Air Service
- Type: Squadron
- Role: Army Observation
- Part of: American Expeditionary Forces (AEF)
- Engagements: World War I Occupation of the Rhineland

Commanders
- Notable commanders: Lt. Harry A Miller; Capt. Maury Hill

Insignia
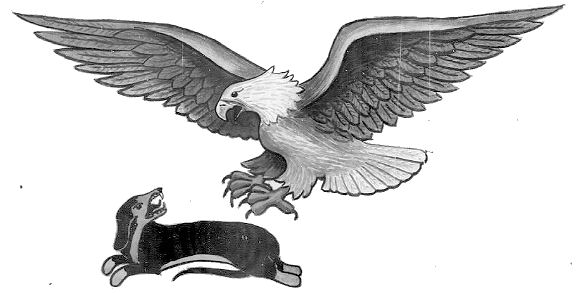
- 24th Aero Squadron Emblem

Aircraft flown
- Fighter: Spad XIII, 1919
- Reconnaissance: Salmson 2A2, 1918; Dayton-Wright DH-4, 1918–1919
- Trainer: Curtiss JN-4, 1917

Service record
- Operations: First Army Observation Group; Western Front, France: 14 August-11 November 1918: Total Sorties: 465; Combat Missions: 22; Enemy Combats: 54; Killed: 0; Wounded: 1 Observer; Missing: 3 Pilots, 3 Observers; Aircraft lost: 18
- Victories: Enemy Aircraft shot down: 12; Enemy Balloons shot down: 0; Total Enemy Aircraft Destroyed: 12; Notable pilots: Lt. Raymond P Dillon**, 4 aerial victories; Lt. George E. Goldthwaite**, 1 aerial victory; Lt. Spessard L. Holland*, 1 aerial victory; Capt. Maury Hill**, 2 aerial victories; Lt. John B. Lee*, 4 aerial victories; * Observer/Gunner ** Pilot (shared with Observer/Gunner)

The 24th Aero Squadron was a United States Army Air Service unit that fought on the Western Front during World War I.

The squadron was assigned as an Army Observation Squadron, performing long-range, strategic reconnaissance over the entire length of the United States First Army sector of the Western Front in France. After the 1918 Armistice with Germany, the squadron was assigned to the United States Third Army as part of the Occupation of the Rhineland in Germany. It returned to the United States in August 1919 and was demobilized.

In 1921, the squadron was consolidated with the United States Army Air Service 24th Squadron. It later served in the Panama Canal Zone during World War II as the 24th Fighter Squadron under 6th Air Force. It has been inactive since October 1946.

== History ==
The 24th Fighter Squadron was originally formed on 1 May 1917 as Company F, Provisional Aviation School Squadron at Kelly Field, Texas. It then became the 19th Provisional Aviation School Squadron on 14 June 1917 and the 24th Aero Squadron (Observation) 23 July 1917. On 11 November 1917, the original squadron was divided, with half of the squadron being re-formed into the 185th Aero Squadron.

On 28 December the 24th Squadron left Kelly Field, moving to the Aviation Concentration Center, Camp Mills, Garden City, New York where the unit awaited transport for overseas service. The squadron sailed on the Cunard Liner RMS Carmania on 9 January, arriving at Liverpool, England on 24 January. From Liverpool, the squadron went by train to the Romney Rest Camp, Winchester, where it awaited a training assignment with the Royal Flying Corps for advanced training. On 31 January, the squadron was divided into four flights for training, which "A" Flight was assigned to RFC Wye, Kent; "B" Flight to RFC London Colney, Hertfordshire; "C" Flight to RFC Sedgeford, Norfolk and "D" Flight RFC Wyton, Huntingdonshire. On 7 March, "B" Flight was moved to RFC Croydon in South London. At these locations, squadron personnel worked with British RFC units in maintaining aircraft and learning the means and methods of an operational squadron.

On 1 May, the squadron was re-assembled at RFC Narborough, Norfolk for final training. On 11 July 1918, the squadron was considered ready for combat duty and was sent to France, crossing the Channel to arrive in Le Havre, France, on 22 July. It moved to the Air Service Replacement Concentration Barracks in St. Maixent, where it was processed into the American Expeditionary Forces. 6 August saw another movement to Ourches Aerodrome, where it was designated a Corps Observation squadron and assigned to the IV Corps Observation Group, receiving Salmson 2A2 aircraft. However, at the last minute, it was reassigned to the First Army Observation Group at Gondreville-sur-Moselle Aerodrome on 22d August.

=== Combat in France ===
Its first combat mission came on 12 September 1918 during the St. Mihiel Offensive, and 13 more missions were flown during the following ten days. The unit's first confirmed combat victory came on 15 September 1918 when 2d Lt. Roe E. Wells (Pilot) and 2d Lt. Albert W. Swinebroad (Observer) shot down a German aircraft. The unit also lost three aircraft during the same period, and of the crews from these aircraft, two men became POWs.

On 22 September the group was moved to Vavicourt Airdrome, behind the Verdun Front in preparation of the Meuse-Argonne Offensive. During the offensive, the squadron was almost continually engaged in combat. During the offensive, the squadron sent out a total of 155 reconnaissance flights, completing a total of 8729 kilometers behind enemy lines, bringing back valuable intelligence acquired by visual reconnaissance or by aerial photography and in aerial combat destroying 9 enemy aircraft. 22 of the missions completed during the offensive were special reconnaissance missions directed by First Army Headquarters to obtain specific information urgently needed or to verify reports that required confirmation. All of these missions were carried out at extremely low altitudes.

For these special duties, teams were detached from the squadron and sent to Army Headquarters at Souilly between 9 and 18 October. On one such mission, 1st Lt. Raymond P. Dillon (Pilot) and 2d Lt. John B. Lee III engaged nine enemy aircraft and claimed three of them.

=== Third Army of Occupation ===
After the November 1918 Armistice with Germany, the squadron remained at Vavincourt Aerodrome until 15 April 1919. With the inactivation of the First Army Air Service, the 24th was then assigned to Weißenthurm Airdrome, Germany to serve as part of the occupation force of the Rhineland under the Third Army Air Service, III Corps Observation Group. For the next six months the squadron flew a mixture of US-built Dayton-Wright DH-4s, French SPAD XIIIs, and also the squadron was able to perform test flights on surrendered German aircraft. Flights of the Fokker D.VII, Pfalz D.XII, Halberstadts and Rumpler aircraft were made and evaluations were made.

On 18 July 1919, the squadron first went to the 1st Air Depot at Colombey-les-Belles Airdrome, to turn in all of its supplies and equipment and was relieved from duty with the AEF. The squadron's Salmson aircraft were delivered to the Air Service American Air Service Acceptance Park No. 1 at Orly Aerodrome to be returned to the French. There practically all of the pilots and observers were detached from the squadron. Personnel at Colombey were subsequently assigned to the commanding general, services of supply, and ordered to report to one of several staging camps in France. There, personnel awaited scheduling to report to one of the base ports in France for transport to the United States. Upon return to the US, most squadron personnel were demobilized at Camp Mills, New York in late July 1919.

The squadron returned to the United States on or about 1 August 1919 and reported to Mitchell Field, on Long Island, New York. However, the squadron was sent to Park Field, near Memphis Tennessee where personnel were de-mobilized and returned to civilian life. It was carried as an administrative unit, possibly under the Eastern Department, however, it was not re-manned and was finally inactivated on 1 October 1919.

=== Lineage ===
- Formed as Company F, Provisional Aviation School Squadron, Kelly Field on 1 May 1917

Re-designated: 19th Provisional Aviation School Squadron, 14 June 1917
Re-designated: 24th Aero Squadron, 23 July 1917
Re-designated: 24th Aero Squadron (Army Observation) 22d August 1917
Demobilized on 1 October 1919

=== Assignments ===
- Post Headquarters, Kelly Field, 1 May-28 December 1917
- Aviation Concentration Center, 28 December 1917 – 9 January 1918
- Air Service Headquarters, AEF, British Isles, 24 January- 6 August 1918

Attached to: Royal Flying Corps, 24 January-18 July 1918

- Replacement Concentration Center, AEF, 23 July-6 August 1918
- IV Corps Observation Group, 6 August 1918
- First Army Observation Group, 22d August 1918
- III Corps Observation Group, 15 April 1919
- Third Army Air Services, 15 May 1919
- 1st Air Depot, 18 July 1919
- Commanding General, Services of Supply, July 1919
- Eastern Department (United States Army), 5 August-1 October 1919

=== Stations ===
- Kelly Field, Texas, 1 May-28 December 1917
- Aviation Concentration Center, Garden City, New York, 28 December 1917 – 9 January 1918
- Port of Entry, Hoboken, New Jersey

Trans-Atlantic crossing, RMS Carmania, 9–24 January 1918

- Romney Rest Camp, Winchester, England, 24–31 January 1918

Divided into training flights, 31 January-11 May 1918

Flight "A", RFC Wye, Kent
Flight "B", RFC London Colney/RFC Croyden, South London
Flight "C", RFC Sedgeford, Norfolk
FLight "D", RFC Wyton, Huntingdonshire

- RFC Narborough, Norfolk, 11 May-18 July 1918
- St. Maixent Replacement Barracks, France, 23 July 1918
- Ourches Aerodrome, France, 6 August 1918
- Gondreville-sur-Moselle Aerodrome, France, 22 August 1918
- Vavincourt Aerodrome, France, 22 September 1918 (detachment operated from Souilly Aerodrome, 9–18 October 1918, 27 October-6 November 1918)
- Weißenthurm Airdrome, Germany, 15 April 1919
- Colombey-les-Belles Airdrome, 18 July 1919
- France, July 1919
- Mitchel Field, New York, c. 2 August 1919
- Park Field, Tennessee, August-1 October 1919

=== Enemy aircraft flown for evaluation ===
- Evaluated Fokker D.VII, Pfalz D.XII, Halberstadt and Rumpler aircraft, 1919

=== Combat sectors and campaigns ===
Streamer	Sector/Campaign	Dates	Notes
	St. Mihiel Offensive Campaign	12–16 September 1918	
	Meuse-Argonne Offensive Campaign	26 September-11 November 1918	

=== Notable personnel ===
- Lt. Royal W. B. Cowan, SSC
- Lt. Raymond P Dillon, DSC, 4 aerial victories
- Lt. George E. Goldthwaite, DSC, SSC, 1 aerial victory
- Lt. Spessard L. Holland, DSC, 1 aerial victory
- Lt. Samuel R. Keesler, SSC, POW (KIA)
- Capt. Maury Hill, DSC, SSC, 2 aerial victories
- Lt. John B. Lee, DSC, 4 aerial victories
- Lt. Hendrick M. Search, SSC

DSC: Distinguished Service Cross; SSC: Silver Star Citation; POW: Prisoner of War Medal; KIA: Killed in Action

== See also ==
- Organization of the Air Service of the American Expeditionary Force
- List of American aero squadrons
