= Victor Herbert Strahm =

American World War I flying ace

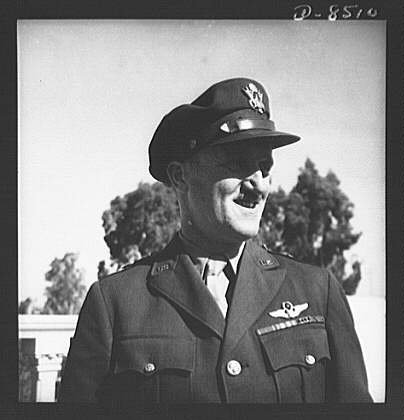
- Strahm in January 1943
- Born: 26 October 1895; Nashville, Tennessee, USA
- Died: 11 May 1957 (aged 61); Lackland Air Force Base, Texas, USA
- Burial place: Forest Park Cemetery, Shreveport, Louisiana, USA
- Military career
- Allegiance: United States
- Branch: Air Service, United States Army; United States Army Air Corps; United States Army Air Forces; United States Air Force
- Service years: 1917–1953
- Rank: Major
- Unit: 91st Aero Squadron (Observation)
- Conflicts: World War I World War II
- Awards: Distinguished Service Cross
- Other work: Deputy commander, 9th Air Force during World War II

Major (later Brigadier General) Victor Herbert Strahm (26 October 1895 – 11 May 1957) began his career as a World War I flying ace credited with five aerial victories. In his 36-year career, he served as a chief test pilot for the United States Army Air Forces while en route to higher command.

During World War II, Strahm was Chief of Staff of the Ninth Air Force. He was promoted to deputy commander of the 33rd Air Division at Tinker Air Force Base in Oklahoma City and commander of Barksdale Air Force Base in Shreveport, Louisiana. He retired with the rank of Brigadier General in 1953 after 36 years of service. On 28 April 1957, having undergone heart surgery and despondent due to ill health, Strahm was found at his home in Shreveport with a bullet wound to the head and a .32 caliber pistol at his side. He was flown to the Lackland Air Force Base hospital and died on 11 May 1957 at the age of 61.

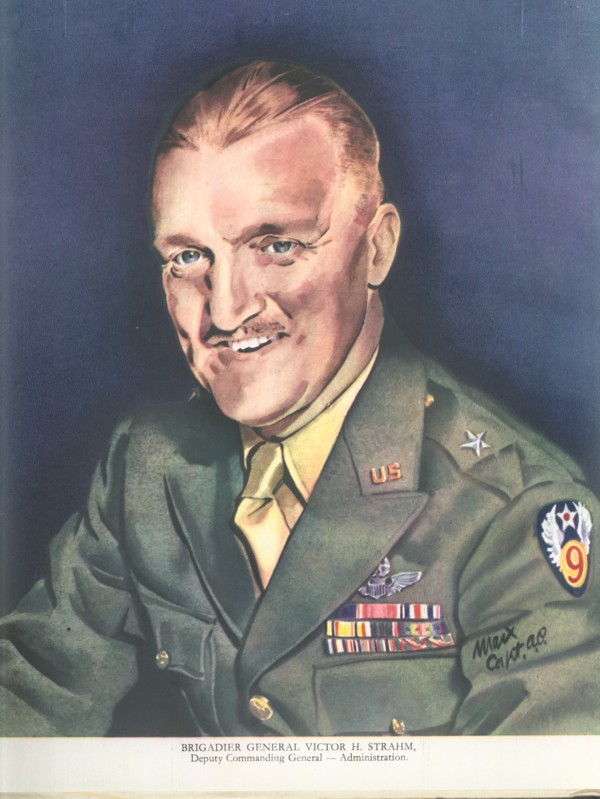
Watercolor portrait of Brigadier General Victor H. Strahm, 9th Air Force, United States Army Air Force 1945

== See also ==
- List of World War I flying aces from the United States

== Bibliography ==
American Aces of World War 1 Harry Dempsey. Osprey Publishing, 2001. ISBN 1-84176-375-6, ISBN 978-1-84176-375-0.
