= Gondreville, Meurthe-et-Moselle =

Gondreville
- Commune
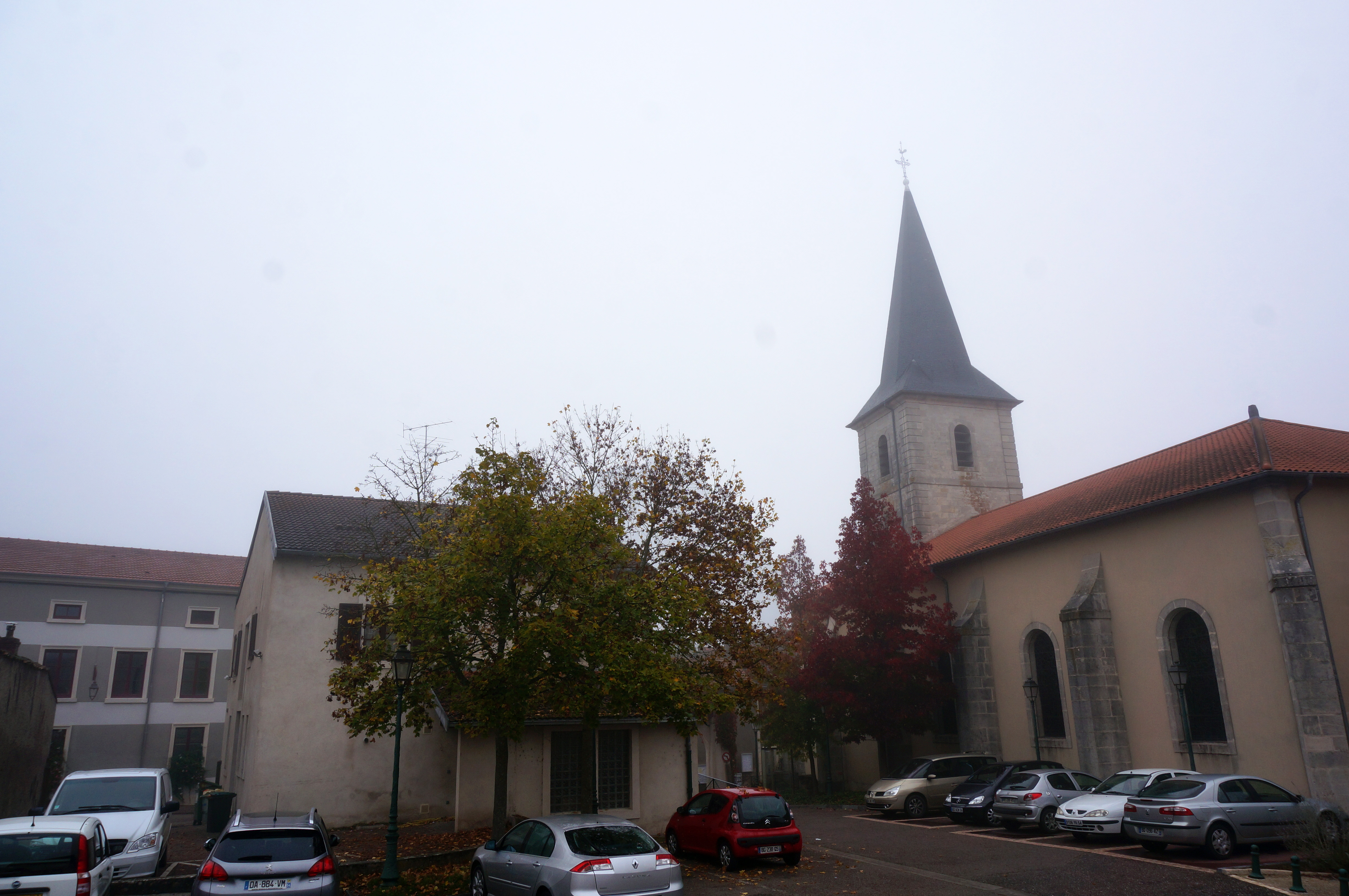
- The town hall, post office and church in Gondreville

- Coat of arms
- Location of Gondreville
- Location within France Location within Grand Est
- Coordinates: 48°41′35″N 5°57′39″E
- Country: France
- Region: Grand Est
- Department: Meurthe-et-Moselle
- Arrondissement: Toul
- Canton: Le Nord-Toulois
- Intercommunality: Terres Touloises

Government
  - Mayor (2020–2026): Raphaël Arnould
- Area^{1}: 25.03 km^{2} (9.66 sq mi)
- Elevation: 200 m (660 ft)
- Highest elevation: 330 m (1,080 ft)
- Lowest elevation: 196 m (643 ft)
- Population (2023): 2,635
  - Density: 105.3/km^{2} (272.7/sq mi)
- Time zone: UTC+01:00 (CET)
  - Summer (DST): UTC+02:00 (CEST)
- INSEE/Postal code: 54232 /54840
- ^{1} French Land Register data, which excludes lakes, ponds, glaciers > 1 km^{2} (0.386 sq mi or 247 acres) and river estuaries.

Gondreville (French pronunciation: [ɡɔ̃dʁəvil]) is a commune in the Meurthe-et-Moselle department in north-eastern France. It was a base for the United States Air Service during World War I.

== Population ==
Historical population
Year	Pop.	±% p.a.
1968	1,274	—
1975	1,476	+2.12%
1982	1,592	+1.09%
1990	2,145	+3.80%
1999	2,215	+0.36%
2007	2,854	+3.22%
2012	2,887	+0.23%
2017	2,801	−0.60%
2023	2,635	−1.01%
Source: INSEE

== See also ==
- Communes of the Meurthe-et-Moselle department
