= Harold Huston George =

American flying ace and general (1892–1942)

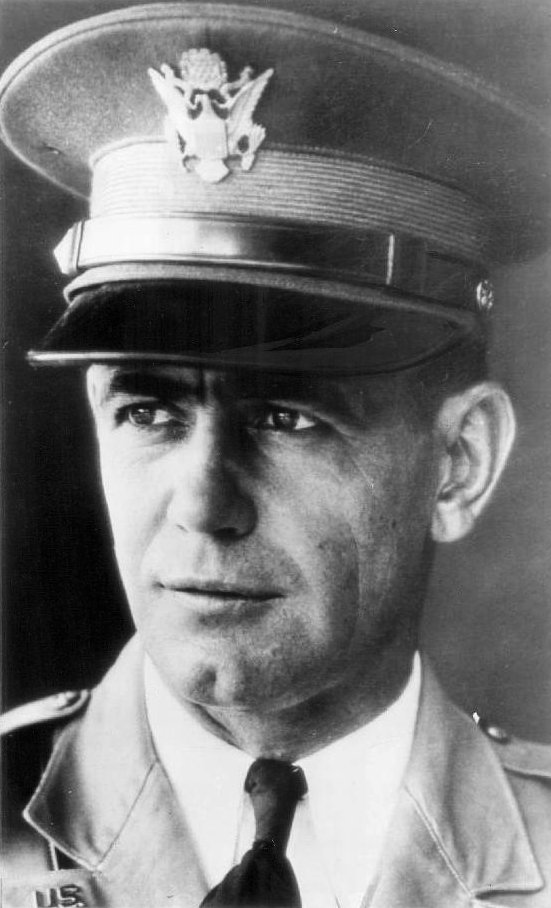
- Harold Huston George
- Born: 14 September 1892; Lockport, New York
- Died: 29 April 1942 (aged 49); Darwin, Australia
- Burial place: Arlington National Cemetery
- Military career
- Branch: Air Service, United States Army; United States Army Air Corps; United States Army Air Forces
- Service years: 1916-1942
- Rank: Brigadier General
- Nickname: "Pursuit" George
- Service number: 0-9605
- Unit: Air Service, United States Army: 139th Aero Squadron
- Commands: Far East Air Force; 5th Interceptor Command; 31st Pursuit Group; 94th Pursuit Squadron
- Conflicts: World War I World War II: Philippines campaign (1941–1942)
- Awards: Distinguished Service Cross; Distinguished Service Medal; Silver Star

Harold Huston George (14 September 1892 – 29 April 1942) was a general officer in the United States Army Air Forces during World War II. He began his military career before World War I when he enlisted as a private in the 3rd New York Infantry Regiment. Joining the Air Service, he became an ace in France in 1918, credited with five aerial victories.

George, known as "Pursuit" George to distinguish him from Harold L. George ("Bomber" George), commanded the 5th Interceptor Command (Provisional) on Luzon following the attack by Japan on the Philippine Islands, then directed the remnants of the Army's air forces in the Philippine Islands after Far East Air Force commander Maj. Gen. Lewis H. Brereton evacuated to Australia on 24 December 1941.

== World War I service ==
George joined the New York National Guard on 5 July 1916, during the crisis caused by Pancho Villa's raid on Columbus, New Mexico. His unit was federalized and deployed to the Mexican border, where he served as a sergeant until 5 October.

George enlisted as an aviation cadet on 15 April 1917, in the Aviation Section, U.S. Signal Corps. He completed flying training on the Curtiss biplane at Hazelhurst Field, Mineola, New York, received a rating of reserve military aviator, and was commissioned a first lieutenant in the Signal Officers Reserve Corps (SORC) on 15 September 1917. He went to Kelly Field, Texas, for additional training before going to Tours, France, as commanding officer of the 201st Aero Squadron in October 1917.

For six months he instructed other pilots at the Air Service AEF's training center at Issoudun. He then took pursuit pilot and gunnery courses himself and went into combat in August 1918 with the 185th Aero Squadron, and later duty with the 139th Aero Squadron.

George arrived at the 139th Aero Squadron on 18 September 1918. He scored his first two victories on 27 October, near Bantheville, France, he struck a formation of four enemy Fokkers, destroying two and driving the other two away. George shot down a Fokker D.VII single-handed and shared a second win with Robert Opie Lindsay. Two days later, he doubled again, sharing the wins over Fokker D.VIIs with Edward Haight and Karl Schoen. On 5 November, he shared his fifth victory over a D.VII with two other pilots, and became an ace. His Distinguished Service Cross came through after war's end, in 1919

After his return to the United States, George married Vera McKenna, whom he had met in Tours, France, where she was working, on 5 April 1919, in New York City. They had two children, Robert (born 1920) and Peggy (born 1922).

== Between wars ==
After the war he returned to the United States for duty at Langley Field, Virginia. In November 1919 he became flight commander and commanding officer of the 19th Pursuit Squadron at March Field, California, serving until March 1922. During that time he applied for and received a regular Army commission as captain, Air Service, on 1 July 1920, when the Air Service became a combat arm of the line. He went to Fort Douglas, Utah, for three years as Air Service Officer to the 104th Division. He was transferred to the Advanced Flying School at Kelly Field in March 1925, as an instructor for two years, commanding officer of the 43d School Squadron, and chief of pursuit instruction to July 1929.

He was then assigned to France Field, Panama for a two-year tour, as operations officer and commanding officer of the 24th Pursuit and 7th Observation Squadrons, respectively. He returned to Langley Field on 25 June 1932, as commanding officer of the 33d Pursuit Squadron, followed by assignments as intelligence and operations officer of the 8th Pursuit Group. In 1934 he commanded a sector of the Eastern Zone of Army Air Corps Mail Operation, responsible for Air mail operations on routes between Newark, New Jersey; Cleveland, Ohio; St. Louis, Missouri; and Memphis, Tennessee.

From September 1936 to June 1937, he attended the Air Corps Tactical School at Maxwell Field, Alabama, followed in 1937–1938 by the Command and General Staff School at Fort Leavenworth, Kansas. His next assignment was to Selfridge Field, Michigan with the 1st Pursuit Group, where he commanded its 94th Pursuit Squadron. On 1 February 1940, he was promoted to lieutenant colonel and named commander of the 31st Pursuit Group, newly activated at Selfridge.

George commanded an aircraft-ferrying flight to Panama via Mexico and Central America, exactly 20 years after he had flown a DeHaviland plane to the Pacific Coast and return to New York in an early-day transcontinental reliability test flight.

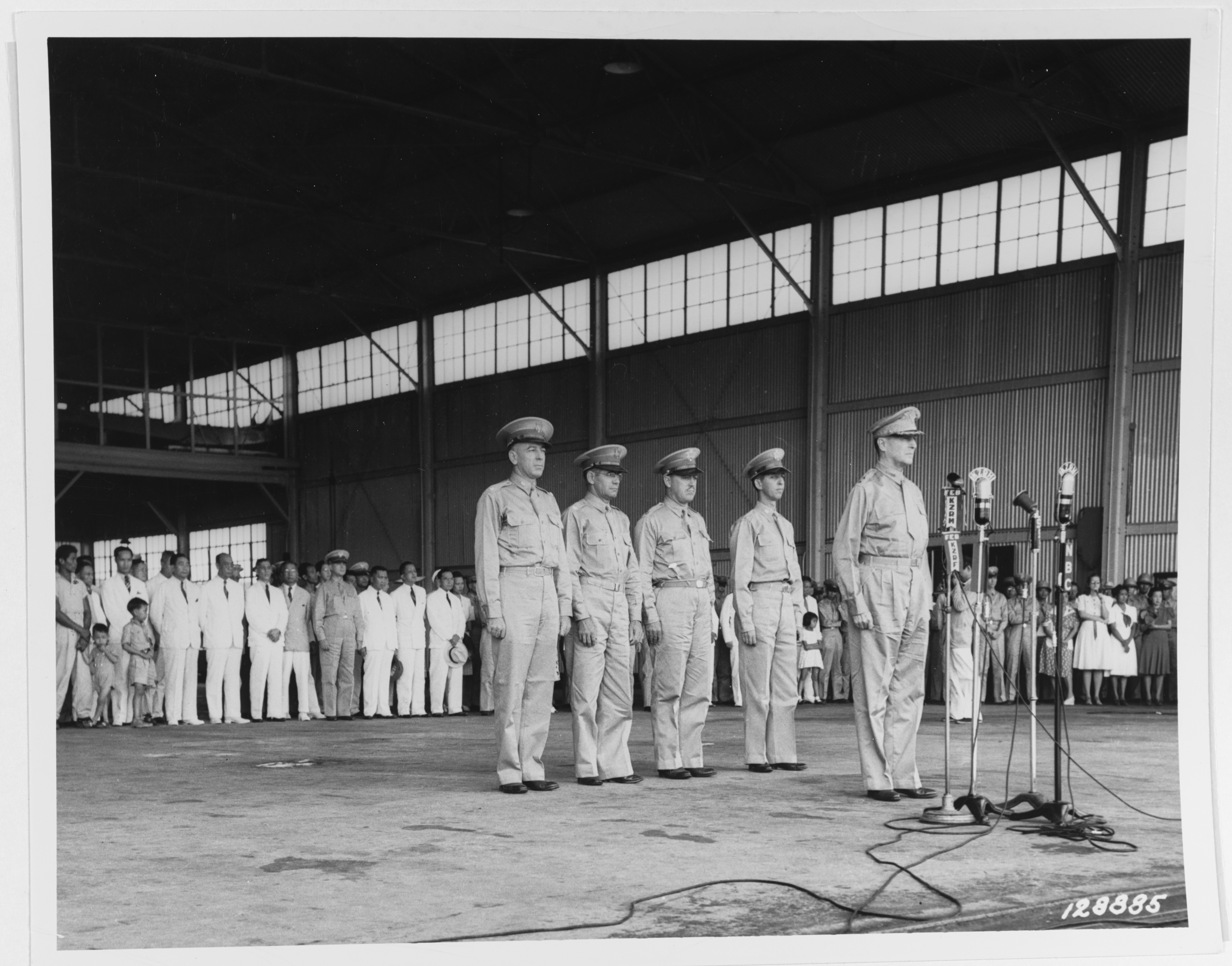
Ceremony at Camp Murphy in Rizal marking the induction of the Philippine Army Air Corps into the U.S. Army on 15 August 1941. George is second from left in the rank behind Gen. Douglas MacArthur.

On 4 May 1941, Brig. Gen. Henry B. Clagett arrived at Manila in the Philippines to command the newly created Philippine Department Air Force. George, promoted to colonel on 9 October 1940, accompanied him as his chief of staff. As the War Department belatedly attempted to expand the defenses in the Philippines, the air forces evolved first into the Air Force, United States Army Forces Far East in August, and then into the Far East Air Force in November 1941. Clagett was named commander of the 5th Interceptor Command (Provisional) and George remained as his chief of staff after a short stint as head of supply for FEAF. When Clagett was sent to Australia in mid-December, George inherited the pursuit command, and when Brereton and a small staff also left on 24 December, George became de facto commander of the remaining Army aviation units and personnel.

He was promoted to brigadier general on 25 January 1942, and made his command post at Mariveles on the Bataan peninsula. On 11 March 1942, he was evacuated from Corregidor by PT boat along with Gen. Douglas MacArthur. General George was awarded the Silver Star for his actions on Corregidor.

== Death on duty ==
George died as a result of a ground accident at Batchelor Field, southeast of Darwin, Australia in late April 1942. George had just arrived at Batchelor on a Lockheed C-40 and was standing near it, when the pilot of a Curtiss P-40 Warhawk of the 49th Fighter Group lost directional control on takeoff. The Warhawk collided with the C-40, causing a shower of debris. A wheel from the P-40 reportedly struck George in the head. A junior officer and a US war correspondent, Melvin Jacoby, also died as a result of the same incident.

Although George received immediate medical attention, including treatment by Lt Lawrence Braslow (US Army Medical Corps), he died the following day. His body was returned to the US and buried at Arlington National Cemetery on 26 May 1942.

The USAAF opened George Army Airfield, a flying training base at Lawrenceville, Illinois, in August 1942. The base was declared surplus in September 1945 and sold. Victorville Air Force Base, California, was renamed George Air Force Base in George's honor in June 1950.

== See also ==
- List of World War I flying aces from the United States

== Bibliography ==
- USAF biography
- Harold Huston George at ArlingtonCemetery.net, an unofficial website
- American Aces of World War I. Norman Franks, Harry Dempsey. Osprey Publishing, 2001. ISBN 978-1-84176-375-0.
