= John Sidney Owens =

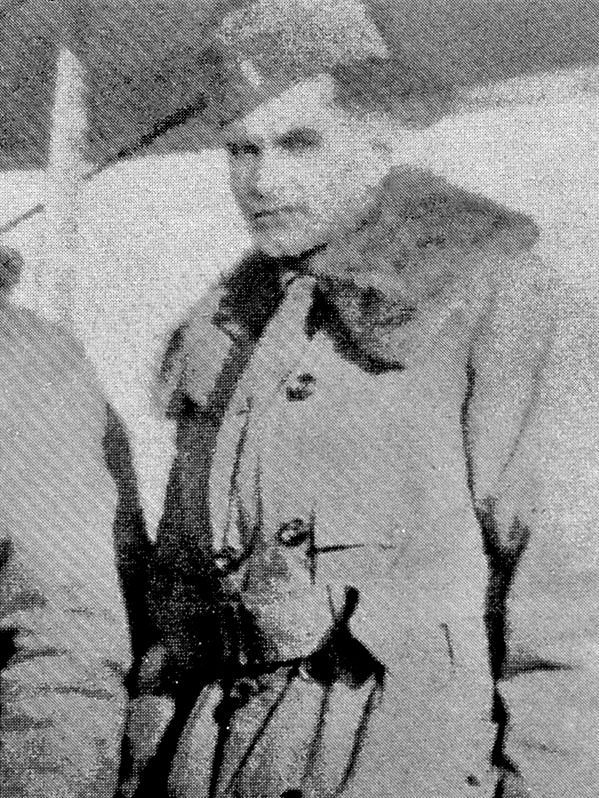
- Lieutenant John Sidney Owens, 139th Aero Squadron, Souilly Aerodrome, France, 1918
- Born: May 26, 1893
- Died: January 14, 1965 (aged 71)
- Burial place: Arlington National Cemetery, Alexandria, Virginia
- Military career
- Allegiance: United States
- Branch: Air Service, United States Army
- Unit: 139th Aero Squadron
- Conflicts: World War I

John Sidney Owens (26 May 1893 – 14 January 1965) was an American pursuit pilot and a flying ace in World War I.

== Biography ==
Born in Philadelphia, Pennsylvania, he joined the Air Service, United States Army in 1917 during World War I. After pilot training in the United States, Lieutenant Owens was assigned to the 139th Aero Squadron, 2d Pursuit Group, First Army Air Service. In combat over the Western Front in France, Lieutenant Owens was credited with shares in five victories.

During World War II, he attained the rank of lieutenant colonel in the United States Army Air Forces, later attaining the rank of colonel in the postwar United States Air Force.

He died at Coral Gabels, Florida on 14 January 1965.

== See also ==
- List of World War I flying aces from the United States
