= 139th Aero Squadron =

US Army Air Service unit

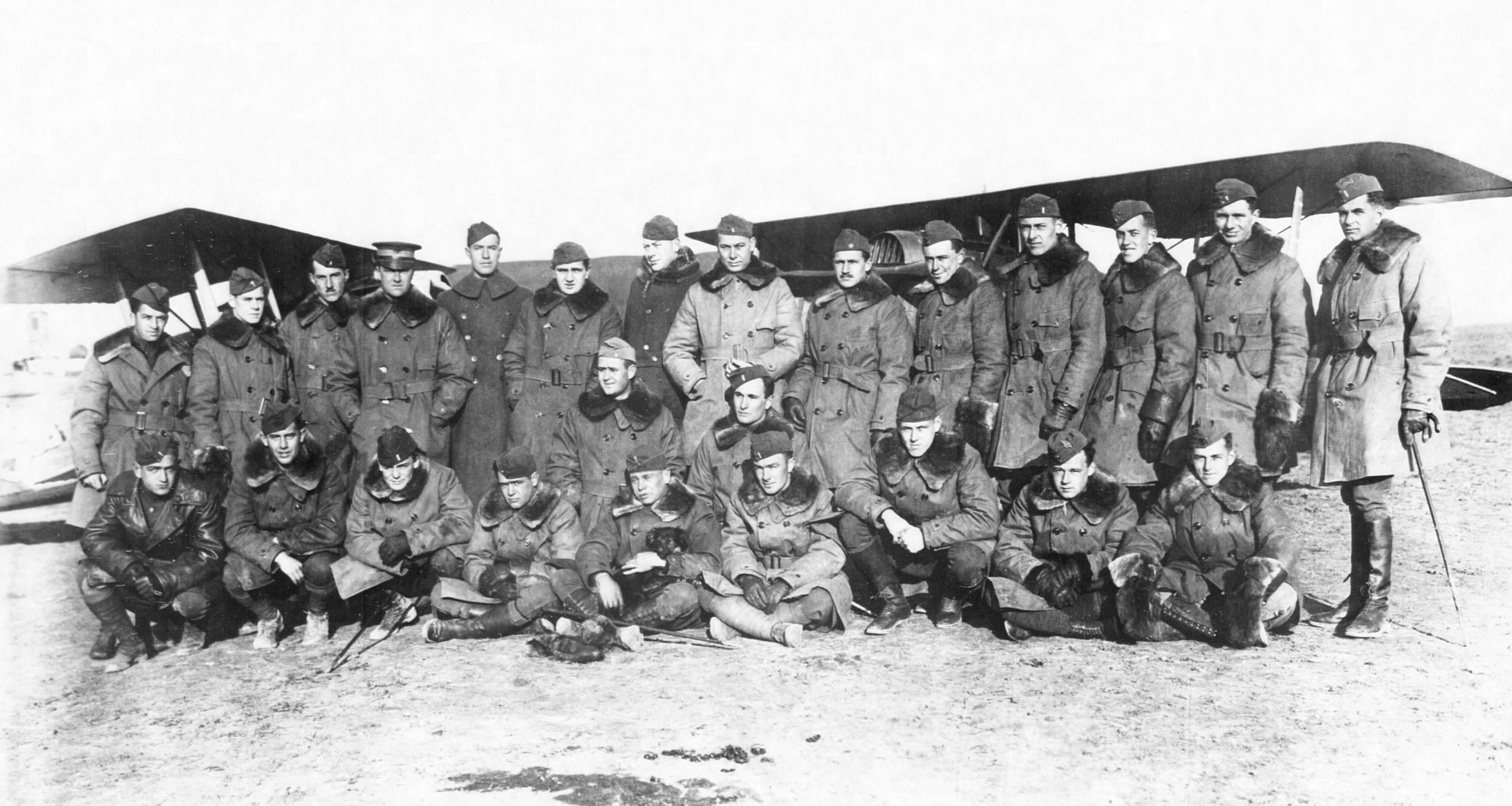
- 139th Aero Squadron, Souilly Aerodrome, France, November 1918
- Active: 21 September 1917 – 17 June 1919
- Country: United States
- Branch: United States Army Air Service
- Type: Squadron
- Role: Pursuit
- Part of: American Expeditionary Forces (AEF)
- Fuselage Code: "Flying Mercury"
- Engagements: World War I

Commanders
- Notable commanders: Lt. David Endicott Putnam (Acting); Maj. Lawrence C. Angstrom

Insignia
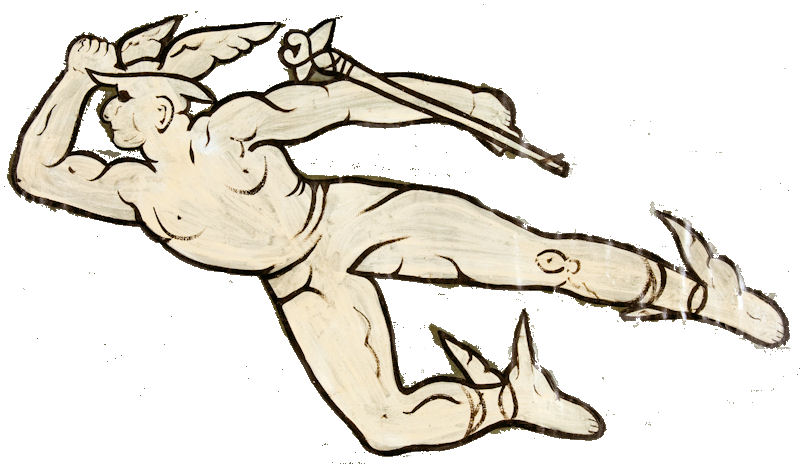
- 139th Aero Squadron Emblem

Aircraft flown
- Fighter: Nieuport 28, 1918; SPAD VII, 1918; SPAD XIII, 1918–1919
- Trainer: Curtiss JN-4, 1917

Service record
- Operations: 2d Pursuit Group; Western Front, France: 12 June-11 November 1918
- Victories: 34 aircraft Air Aces: 7: Lt. Harold H. George, 5 (4 shared); Lt. Edward M. Haight, 5 (4 shared); Lt. Robert O. Lindsay, 6 (5 shared); Lt. Joseph S. Owens, 5 (all shared); Capt. David E. Putnam, 4 (1 probable)* * Putnam had a total of 13 aerial victories, 4 of which were shared, and also 13 probables. 9 of his victories were while he was serving with MS156 and Spa38 of the French Air Service before joining the 139th A.S.; Lt. Wendel A. Robertson, 7 (6 shared); Lt. Karl Schoen Jr., 7 (all shared)

The 139th Aero Squadron was a United States Army Air Service unit that fought on the Western Front during World War I.

The squadron was assigned as a day pursuit (fighter) squadron as part of the 2d Pursuit Group, First United States Army. Its mission was to engage and clear enemy aircraft from the skies and provide escort to reconnaissance and bombardment squadrons over enemy territory. It also attacked enemy observation balloons, and performed close air support and tactical bombing attacks on enemy forces along the front lines.

The squadron was very successful in combat, having half a dozen air aces including David Putnam, Karl Schoen, Robert Opie Lindsay, and future Brigadier General Harold H. George.

After the 1918 Armistice with Germany, the squadron returned to the United States in June 1919 and was demobilized. There is no current United States Air Force or Air National Guard unit that shares its lineage and history.

== History ==
=== Origins ===
The 139th Aero Squadron was organized at Kelly Field, Texas on 21 September 1917. After a period of indoctrination training, orders were issued for the squadron to proceed to Toronto, Quebec, Canada for technical training under the British Royal Flying Corps (RFC). However, these orders were countermanded and the squadron remained at Kelly Field until 28 October 1917, when it was ordered to proceed to Barron Field, Everman, Texas for training under the RFC. One week later it moved again to Hicks Field, Saginaw Texas for further training. During the squadron's training at Hicks Field, numerous transfers of personnel were made and the squadron was brought to a strength of 204 men.

Upon completion of training by the RFC, the 139th received orders to move to the Aviation Concentration Center at Camp Mills, Garden City, New York on 12 February 1918. The following day, 25 flying officers selected from cadets who trained with the squadron were assigned. The squadron left Fort Worth, Texas on 14 February, and arrived at Camp Mills on the 19th. After a short period at the concentration center, the squadron left New York Harbor on 26 February on the RMS Olympic. It arrived in Liverpool, England, on 5 March. It was transferred by train to Winchester, England, where it awaited further orders at the Romney Rest Camp. On 17 March orders were received to move to France. The squadron left for Le Havre on the 17th and arrived on the 18th. It then proceeded to the 2d Aviation Instruction Center, (2d AIC) American Expeditionary Forces (AEF) at Tours Aerodrome, arriving on 21 March.

=== Training in France ===
During its assignment at the 2d AIC, the squadron engaged in station duties until being ordered to proceed to the 3d Aviation Instruction Center (3d AIC) at Issoudun Aerodrome to complete training for combat duties. It arrived at Issodun on 29 March. At Issodun, the flying officers commenced training in Nieuport 28s a few days after the arrival of the men. The enlisted personnel were trained as mechanics for the various types of French aircraft that were in use at the front. Training was completed at the 3d AIC on 24 May 1918, and the 139th was ordered to proceed to the 1st Pursuit Organization and Training Center at Epiez Aerodrome. Orders, however, were again changed and its destination was changed to Vaucouleurs Aerodrome. The squadron arrived at Vaucouleurs on 28 May 1918.

The squadron's first plane, a SPAD VII, was assigned on 10 June, and the remaining planes arrived within a week. As the squadron pilots and mechanics had no experience with the SPAD VII, the mechanics were sent to a French aerodrome where they remained for about ten days. With their return, two French mechanics, along with two representatives from the Hispano-Suiza factory arrived at Vaucouleurs. Language difficulties, however, negated the benefit of these representatives and they returned to their home bases while the mechanics worked out on-the-job training for maintaining the SPAD VIIs. The month of June was devoted to training flights and reconnaissance along the front lines. A major difficulty was the lack of supplies and equipment necessary to keep the SPAD VIIs operational. Many times it was necessary to appeal to the French for these items, and they assisted in every way possible.

=== Western Front combat ===
On 30 June, the squadron was reassigned to the 2d Pursuit Group and moved to Croix de Metz Aerodrome, near Toul. The 139th was the first squadron assigned to the new group. Later, the 13th, 22d and 49th Aero Squadrons were assigned to the group at Toul.

The first combat between the 139th and enemy aircraft took place on 30 June, and Lt. David E. Putnam shooting down a German biplane. The squadron began flying regular patrols between Pont-à-Mousson and Saint-Mihiel. However, during its first weeks in combat, the sector was relatively quiet and only a few German aircraft were encountered. Six combats were reported during July, and the squadron received confirmation that it had destroyed two enemy aircraft. One pilot, Lt. MacLure, was lost on 17 July when he was forced to land behind enemy lines, however, he was later reported as a Prisoner of War. During August, the Toul Sector was far more active, as the Germans moved more aircraft into the area. In August the squadron engaged in twelve combats, with the squadron receiving four official victories, and several unofficial ones, including the shooting down of several German observation balloons.

The buildup of First Army infantry units was proceeding through August and into September. On 12 September, the St. Mihiel Offensive began with a massive artillery barrage. Orders were received to engage in low-altitude flights in front of the infantry and to machine-gun enemy fortifications, troop concentrations and to attack movements of enemy troops, convoys and railroad lines. However, adverse weather limited flight operations. Very few enemy aircraft were seen, however, but as the day progressed the weather cleared to some extent. Eight enemy aircraft were seen and a combat began. Lt. Putnam destroyed one enemy plane, however he was later killed in action during another combat near Limey. The next day, ten 139th planes engaged in a free-for-all combat with German aircraft in the region of Bayonville, in which four enemy planes were destroyed and two more were claimed (but not confirmed) without loss.

With the success of the St. Mihiel offensive, the squadron was moved from Toul to Belrain Aerodrome on 24 September. On the 25th regular patrols began in the region south of Verdun, and on 26 September, First Army began the Meuse-Argonne Offensive. Aerial activity by the 139th again became very intense, with the squadron flying aircraft from before dawn until after dusk. On the first day of the offensive, one enemy observation aircraft was shot down, and the unit performed several road strafing and bombing missions against enemy infantry forces. At Belrain, the squadron began to be re-equipped with SPAD XIIIs, that were equipped with bomb racks carrying two twenty-pound bombs. During the next few weeks a marked increase of enemy aircraft were seen and attacked. On 28 September three enemy aircraft were shot down.

Bad weather limited operations during early October. However, on the 10th, a massive combat free-for-all resulted with six squadron aircraft engaged with about a dozen German Fokkers. The squadron shot down nine enemy aircraft. The remainder of October was quite active and eleven more successful combats were fought, twenty enemy aircraft were destroyed. The squadron lost Lt Schoen when he was killed in action on 29 October near Esnes-en-Argonne. Poor weather limited the number of patrols flown in early November, although on 5 November, three squadron aircraft attacked an enemy Fokker and pursued it to its Aerodrome, shooting it down directly over its own airfield. The squadron moved to Souilly Aerodrome on 7 November. However, talk of peace had begun and although regular combat patrols were flown, few enemy aircraft were seen. All offensive operations over the lines ceased at 11:00 a.m. on 11 November.

=== Demobilization ===
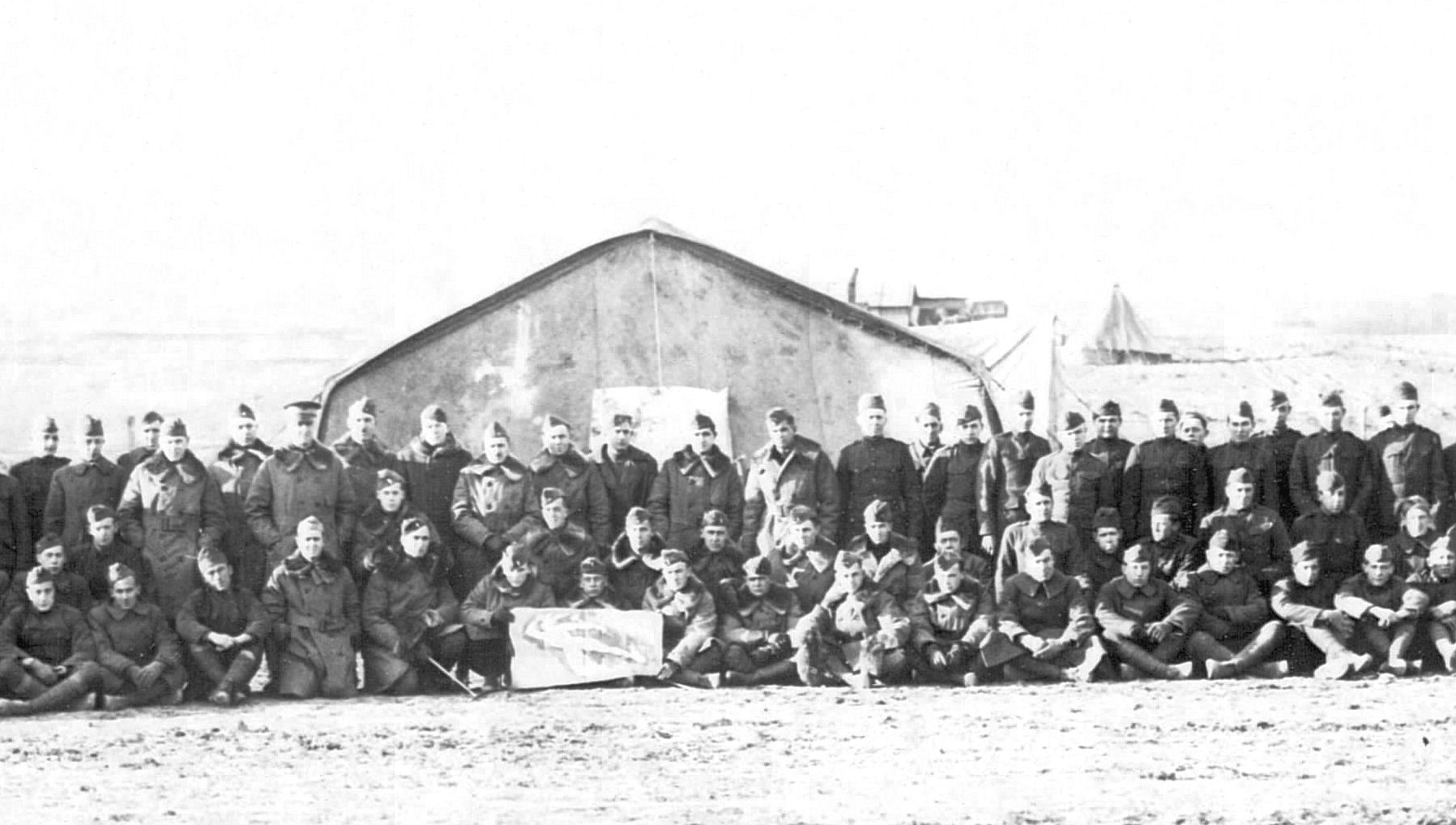
Squadron members with unit emblem, Souilly Aerodrome, France, November 1918

The American Expeditionary Forces was very slow in returning its forces to the United States. The squadron remained at Souilly Airdrome until 29 January 1919 when it moved Grand Aerodrome, France, to help construct a new airfield.

On 18 April orders were received from First Army for the squadron to report to the 1st Air Depot, Colombey-les-Belles Airdrome to turn in all of its supplies and equipment and was relieved from duty with the AEF. The squadron's SPAD aircraft were delivered to the Air Service American Air Service Acceptance Park No. 1 at Orly Aerodrome to be returned to the French. There practically all of the pilots and observers were detached from the squadron.

Personnel at Colombey were subsequently assigned to the commanding general, services of supply, and ordered to report to the staging camp at Le Mans. There, personnel awaited scheduling to report to one of the base ports in France for transport to the United States and subsequent demobilization. It moved to its base port at Brest on 22 May 1919 for transport to the United States. The 139th Aero Squadron (Pursuit), returned to New York City on 14 June, its personnel were returned to civilian life, and the squadron demobilized at Hazelhurst Field, Long Island, on 17 June 1919.

=== Lineage ===
- Organized as 139th Aero Squadron on 21 September 1917

Redesignated: 139th Aero Squadron (Pursuit) on 24 May 1918
Demobilized on 17 June 1919

=== Assignments ===
- Post Headquarters, Kelly Field, 21 September 1917
- Aviation Section, U.S. Signal Corps, 28 October 1917 (attached to Royal Flying Corps for training)
- Aviation Concentration Center, 14 February 1918
- Air Service Headquarters, American Expeditionary Forces, British Isles, 5–17 March 1918
- 2d Aviation Instructional Center, 21 March 1918
- 3d Aviation Instructional Center, 29 March 1918
- 1st Pursuit Organization and Training Center, 28 May 1918
- 2d Pursuit Group, 30 June 1918
- First Army Air Service, 11 December 1918
- 1st Air Depot, 18 April 1919
- Commanding General, Services of Supply, 2 May 1919
- Post Headquarters, Hazelhurst Field, 15–17 June 1919

=== Stations ===
- Kelly Field, Texas, 21 September 1917
- Barron Field, Texas, 28 October 1917
- Hicks Field, Texas, 4 November 1917
- Aviation Concentration Center, Garden City, New York, 19 February 1918
- New York Port of Embarkation, Hoboken, New Jersey

Overseas transport aboard RMS Olympic, 26 February 1918 – 5 March 1918

- Liverpool, England, 5 March 1918
- Romney Rest Camp, Winchester, England, 6 March 1918
- Le Havre, France, 18 March 1918
- Tours Aerodrome, France, 21 March 1918
- Issoudun Aerodrome, France, 29 March 1918
- Vaucouleurs Aerodrome, France, 28 May 1918
- Croix de Metz Aerodrome, France, 30 June 1918
- Belrain Aerodrome, France, 24 September 1918
- Souilly Aerodrome, France, 7 November 1918
- Grand Aerodrome, France, c. 29 January 1919
- Colombey-les-Belles Airdrome, France, 18 April 1919
- Le Mans, France, 2 May 1919
- Brest, France, 22 May 1919
- Hazelhurst Field, New York, 15–17 June 1919

=== Combat sectors and campaigns ===
Streamer	Sector/Campaign	Dates	Notes
	Toul Sector	30 June-11 September 1918	
	St. Mihiel Offensive Campaign	12–16 September 1918	
	Toul-Verdun Sector	17–23 September 1918	
	Meuse-Argonne Offensive Campaign	26 September-11 November 1918	

=== Notable personnel ===
- Lt. Smith J. DeFrance, SSC
- Lt. Harold H. George, DSC, DSM, air ace
- Lt. Hugh A. Gervis, MIA
- Lt. Edward Meeker Haight, SSC, air ace
- Lt. Robert O. Lindsay, DSC, air ace
- Lt. Henry G. MacLure, POW
- Lt. Vaughn McCormick, 2 aerial victories, (KIA with the 22nd Aero Squadron)
- Lt. John S. Owens, air ace
- Lt. Harris E. Petree, DSC, (KIA)
- Lt. David E. Putnam, DSC, air ace (KIA)
- Lt. John J. Quinn, DSC, 3 aerial victories
- Lt. Herman W. Schultz (KIA)
- Lt. Karl J. Schoen, DSC, air ace (KIA)
- Lt. Richard D. Shelby, DSC, 4 aerial victories
- Lt. Harlan R. Sumner, MIA
- Lt. Charles D. Seward, Killed in Training, 6 April 1918

DSC: Distinguished Service Cross; DSM: Army Distinguished Service Medal; SSC: Silver Star Citation; KIA: Killed in Action; POW: Prisoner of War

== See also ==
- Organization of the Air Service of the American Expeditionary Force
- List of American aero squadrons
