= Karl John Schoen =

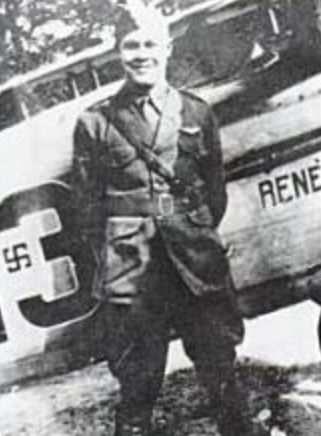
- Lieutenant Karl John Schoen 139th Aero Squadron
- Born: 20 October 1894; Indianapolis, Indiana, United States
- Died: 29 October 1918 (aged 24); Damvilliers, France
- Burial place: Meuse-Argonne American Cemetery, Romagne, France Plot B, Row 38, Grave 9
- Military career
- Allegiance: United States
- Branch: Air Service, United States Army
- Service years: 1917 - 1918
- Rank: First lieutenant
- Unit: 139th Aero Squadron
- Conflicts: World War I
- Awards: Distinguished Service Cross; Purple Heart

First Lieutenant Karl John Schoen (20 October 1894 – 29 October 1918) was a World War I flying ace credited with seven aerial victories while flying a Spad XIII for the USAAS during World War I. As such, he was one of the first American aces flying for his home country.

== Early life ==
Karl John Schoen was the son of John and Effie Morgan Johnston Schoen. He graduated from Purdue University and enlisted on 22 April 1917.

== Aerial service ==
Schoen joined the 139th Aero Squadron on 13 February 1918. Beginning 18 September, he shot down six enemy airplanes in cooperation with such other 139th pilots as Harold H. George and Robert Opie Lindsay. He scored his final two victories on 29 October 1918, and was shot down moments later.

=== Circumstances of his death ===
Unlike the combat death of most World War I aces, the circumstances of Schoen's are well known. A ground observer of the battle, Lieutenant Leser of the Coast Artillery, wrote a letter to Schoen's mother the day of his death, giving a vivid account of both the death and the atmosphere of a World War I dogfight.

"My Dear Mrs. Schoen: I want to extend my most sincere sympathy in your great sorrow over the death of your brave boy, and also give you a full description of the plucky fight he put up...."

"On the afternoon of Oct. 29, I was in an advanced ammunition dump getting powder when three German planes came over, bent on destroying it...."

"I...turned my attention to the other American machine, which...was piloted by your son. First he would be on top and then the boche—both planes maneuvering for the most advantageous position, but as the minutes sped by one could tell he was putting up a losing but game fight. They drove him down until barely 300 yards separated him from the ground. The odds were against him—four machine guns and two men against one machine gun and one man in a much smaller plane...."

"He was so near the ground that he could have landed and have been alive today, but to quit... was not in him; instead of quitting he pulled hard on the steering lever and his little machine bounded straight up under his adversary."

"...his machine gun must have jammed, for I saw him pull his pistol and fire several shots, one or more being effective, as the German observer dropped limp in his seat, and I thought for a moment that he would come out victorious but a sudden burst from the boche's machine gun broke your son's arm, and losing control, his machine started into a fatal nosedive and as it did I saw your boy fire several more shots with his pistol at the then departing boche, and when we picked him up he still had the automatic clasped tightly in his right hand, brave boy that he was, fighting till the last...."

He is buried in France at an AbMC Cemetery in France Karl John Schoen left behind a widow, Mrs. Maurine Schoen, and a 10-month-old daughter. He was posthumously awarded the Distinguished Service Cross in 1919.

== See also ==
- List of World War I flying aces from the United States

== Bibliography ==
- American Aces of World War I. Norman Franks, Harry Dempsey. Osprey Publishing, 2001. ISBN 1-84176-375-6, ISBN 978-1-84176-375-0.
