= Madden Army Airfield =

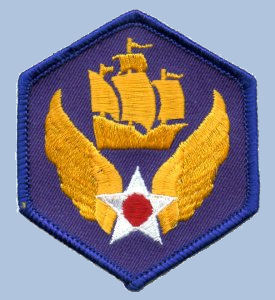
Madden Army Airfield
- Part of Sixth Air Force
- Located in Panama

Site information
- Type: Military airfield
- Controlled by: United States Air Force

Location
- Coordinates: 09°11′36″N 079°33′15″W (Approximate)

Madden Army Airfield is a former United States Army Air Forces World War II air base on Panama as part of the defense of the Panama Canal. The airfield was built to defend Madden Lake and Dam. The 24th Fighter Squadron (XXVI Fighter Command) was assigned to the station from 8 March to 15 August, 1944, flying P-39 Airacobras.
