= David Endicott Putnam =

WW1 American flying ace (1898–1918)

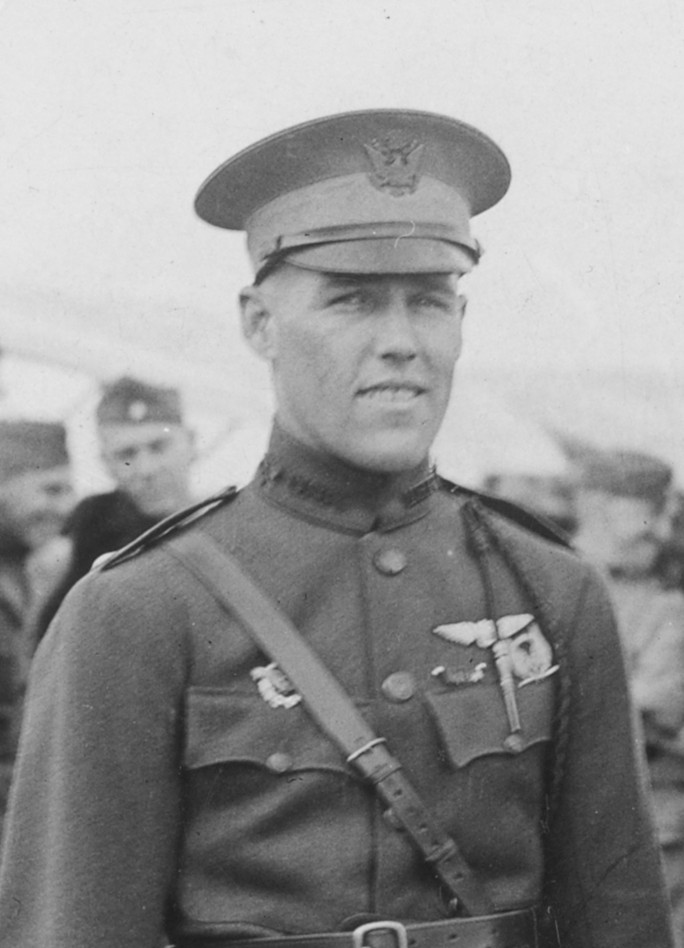
- Putnam in 1918
- Born: December 10, 1898; Jamaica Plain, Massachusetts, U.S.
- Died: September 12, 1918 (aged 19); Limey-Remenauville, France
- Burial place: Mémorial de l'Escadrille La Fayette, Marnes-la-Coquette, France
- Education: Harvard University
- Military career
- Allegiance: United States
- Branch: Aéronautique Militaire (France); Air Service, United States Army
- Service years: 1917–1918
- Rank: Lieutenant
- Units: Aéronautique Militaire: Escadrille SPA.67; Escadrille SPA.163; Air Service, United States Army: 139th Aero Squadron
- Conflicts: World War I †
- Awards: World War I, Distinguished Service Cross (posthumously), the Croix de Guerre, with palms and stars, the Médaille militaire, the Cross of the Legion of Honor, and the American Areo Club Medal.

David Endicott Putnam (December 10, 1898 – September 12, 1918) was an American flying ace of World War I. He was known as the “Ace of Aces,” for thirteen confirmed kills, and thirty cumulative unconfirmed. He was shot down by German ace Georg von Hantelmann.

== Early life ==
A descendant of General Israel Putnam, he was born December 10, 1898, at Jamaica Plain, Massachusetts, the son of Frederick H. Putnam and Jenet Hallowell.

He attended Harvard University and was to graduate Harvard Class of 1920, but instead went overseas and joined the French Foreign Legion. He was posthumously awarded a War Degree (S.B.) by Harvard.

=== Camp Becket ===
Putnam attended Camp Becket-in-the-Berkshires, as a camper from 1914 to 1916, and counselor in 1917 when he was a Harvard freshman. Swimming was one of his passions and he became captain of the Life Saving Crew and assistant swimming instructor. He was also an exceptional tennis player. He was popular among campers and received the 1915 Honor Emblem and 1916 Honor Button, the camp’s highest award. He is described in the camp newspaper Seen and Heard as “Modest and unassuming, yet genial and a good mixer, of high moral standard; he was without question the most popular boy in the camp.” Becket director, Henry W. Gibson affirms that: “The sense of fair play, of consideration for the other fellow, of physical bravery, of moral courage—all of these qualities were given a chance to express themselves in his camp life.”

== Military service ==
He joined the Lafayette Flying Corps of the French Air Service in 1917. In June of the following year, he joined the United States Air Service.

Henry Gibson recalled that Putnam approached him at his tent and said, "I am going across the seas to get in the big fight." He did indeed, by way of a cattle boat, and joined the French Foreign Legion on May 31, 1917. He was transferred to the air service and trained at Avord. Putnam was assigned to Escadrille SPA 94 on 12 December 1917, and was posted to SPA 156 on 7 February 1918. While with the latter unit, he shot down four planes before being transferred to SPA 38 on 1 June 1918, where he claimed two more planes shot down. He was discharged in June 1918.

When the United States entered the war, Putnam joined the United States Army Air Service as a first lieutenant and briefly assumed command of the 134th Aero Squadron before joining the 139th Aero Squadron as a flight commander.

As a gesture of respect, his aviators gave him a dinner in Paris, all 150 under his command. Wine was to be served and he abstained from alcohol, to which end he turned over his glass, and the others followed suit. With the 139th, Putnam scored his last three victories before he was killed in action.

He wrote to Henry Gibson, director of Camp Becket-in-the-Berkshires, where Putnam had been a camper and counsellor, "Can you imagine anyone falling 20,000 feet, nearly four miles, smashing a machine to kindling wood and only getting a broken tooth out of it all? No! Well, I am afraid you are going to try, for that is just what I did yesterday morning."

== Death ==
Just before his own death, Putnam remarked to his mother in a letter in light of a death of a friend, "Isn’t it glorious to give up your life for the great cause? What more could one ask?"

Putnam’s SPAD XIII was shot down by German ace Lt. Georg von Hantelmann. He was shot in the heart. He was scheduled to return home before his death. The official cablegram read, "Lieutenant David Endicott Putnam, killed September 12, 1918; buried September 14, at Toul in a field golden with buttercups, beside Luftbury, Blair, and Thaw."

During his time abroad, Becket director, Henry W. Gibson corresponded with Putnam until the former received a returned letter in his name, with the words ‘deceased’ written on the envelope. Gibson never opened it, and later used it to illustrate in the camp chapel service: we must never delay telling what is on our hearts before it is too late.

== Awards and decorations ==
Putnam shot down thirteen confirmed planes, but unconfirmed totals range from twenty-six to thirty in German territory. He was decorated with the Distinguished Service Cross (posthumously), the Croix de Guerre, with palms and stars, the Médaille militaire, the Cross of the Legion of Honor, and the American Areo Club Medal. He was also recommended for the Medal of Honor.

== See also ==
- List of World War I flying aces from the United States

== Bibliography ==
- American Aces of World War 1 Harry Dempsey. Osprey Publishing, 2001. ISBN 1-84176-375-6, ISBN 978-1-84176-375-0.
- Our Loyal Band Dave DeLuca. Becket-Chimney Corner YMCA: 2003. Pgs. 42-43
- Over the Front: A Complete Record of the Fighter Aces and Units of the United States and French Air Services, 1914–1918 Norman Franks, Frank W. Bailey. Grub Street, 1992. ISBN 0-948817-54-2, ISBN 978-0-948817-54-0.
