= 24th Fighter Squadron =

24th Fighter Squadron

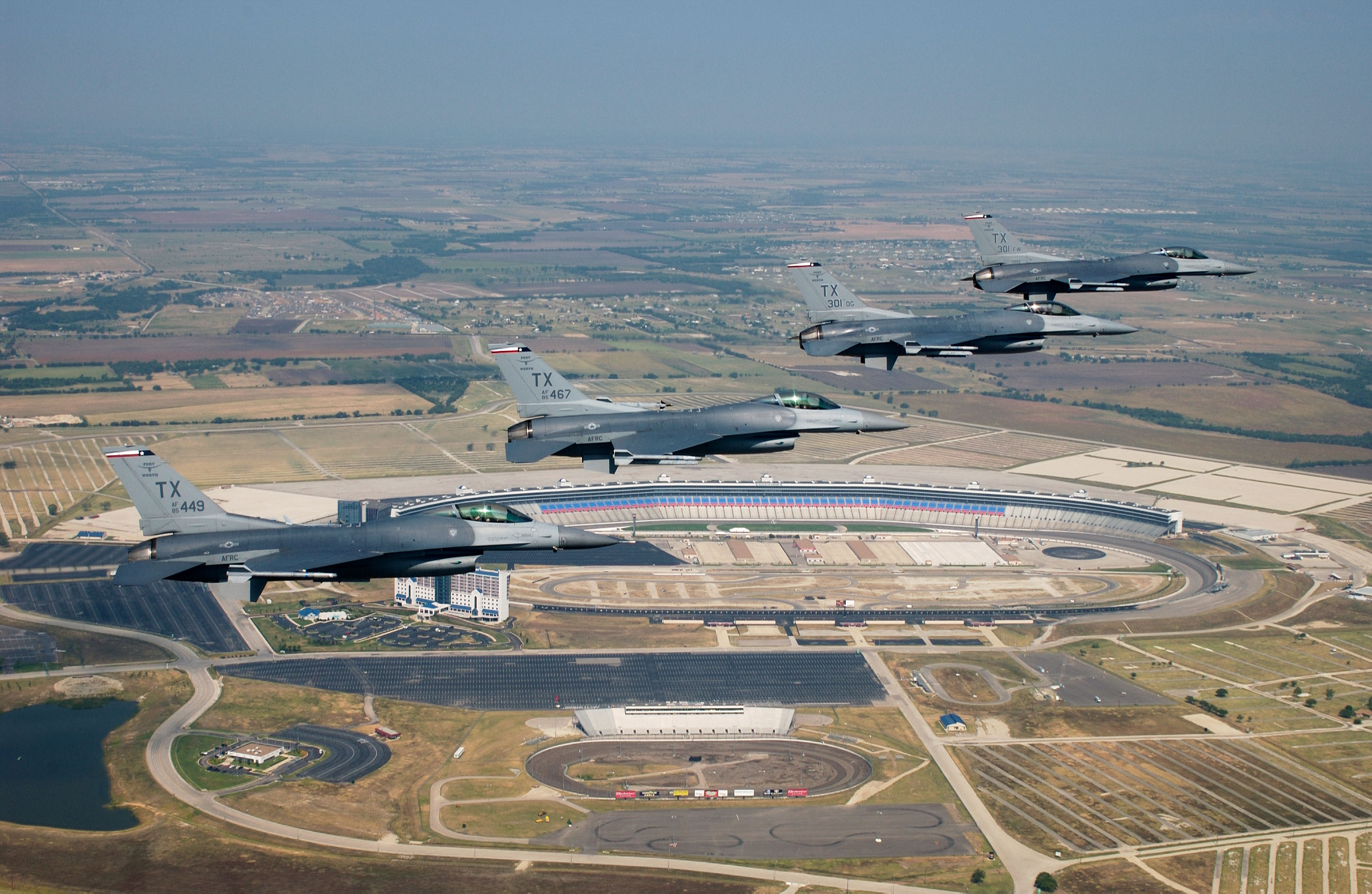
- Four F-16C Fighting Falcons in formation over the Texas Motor Speedway (Note: Aircraft are General Dynamics F-16C Block 30A F-16C Fighting Falcons of the 457th Fighter Squadron. Taken 11 August 2003.)
- Active: 1917–1919; 1921–1946; 2019-present
- Country: United States
- Branch: United States Air Force
- Role: Fighter
- Part of: Air Combat Command
- Garrison/HQ: Naval Air Station Joint Reserve Base Fort Worth
- Nickname(s): Leaping Tigers
- Mascot(s): Leaping Tigers
- Engagements: World War I; World War II – American Theater; Combined Joint Task Force - Operation Inherent Resolve (CJTF-OIR)

Commanders
- Current commander: Lt Col Matthew Riley

Insignia
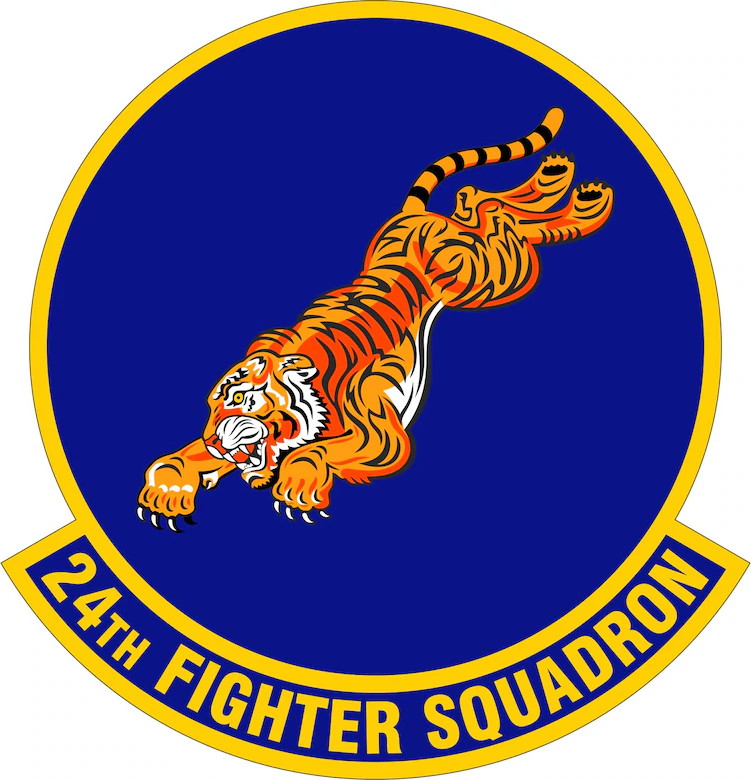
- 24th Fighter Squadron emblem (Note: Approved 30 October 2019.)

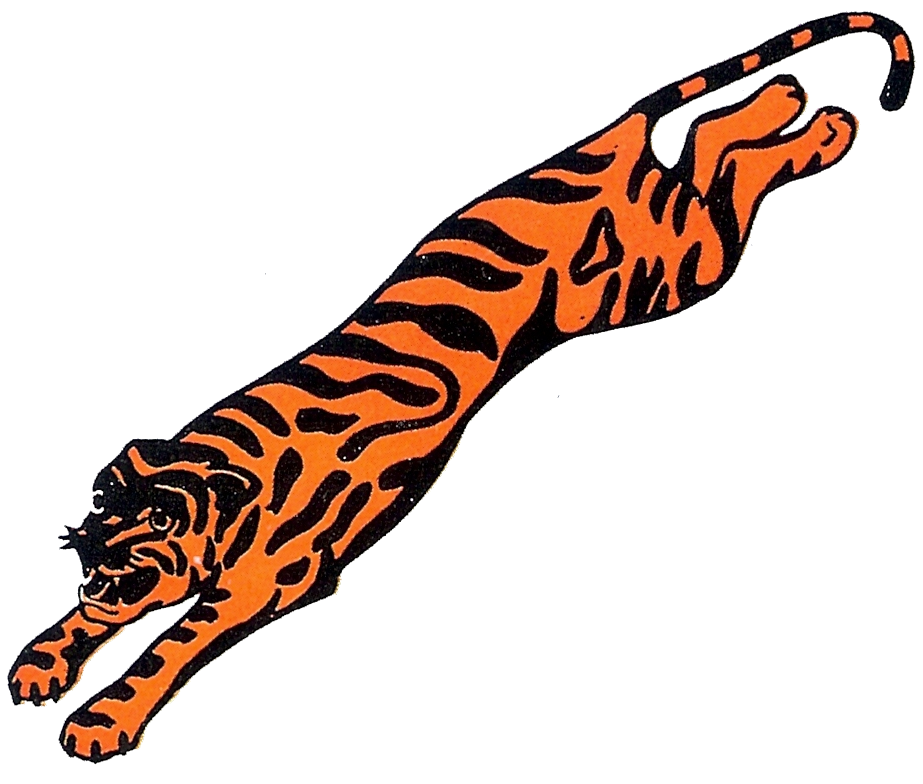
- 24th Pursuit Squadron emblem (Note: Approved 18 February 1924.) (Note: Heraldic description: A leaping tiger in the proper colors. Maurer, Combat Squadrons, p. 128)

Aircraft flown
- Fighter: F-16C, F-35A

The 24th Fighter Squadron is a United States Air Combat Command unit, assigned to the 495th Fighter Group at Naval Air Station Joint Reserve Base Fort Worth, Texas. The squadron was activated in 2019 and flies the F-35A as an active associate unit of the 457th Fighter Squadron.

The squadron's first predecessor was organized in June 1917 as the 19th Aero Squadron, a provisional unit, at Kelly Field, Texas. It deployed to France as the 24th Aero Squadron (Observation) and flew combat missions. Following the armistice, it became part of the Army of Occupation. It returned to the United States and was demobilized in November 1919.

The squadron's second predecessor was formed in 1921 as the 24th Squadron (Pursuit). It moved to the Panama Canal Zone the following year and served in the air defense of the Panama Canal until inactivating in 1946. The two squadrons were consolidated in 1924.

== History ==
=== World War I ===
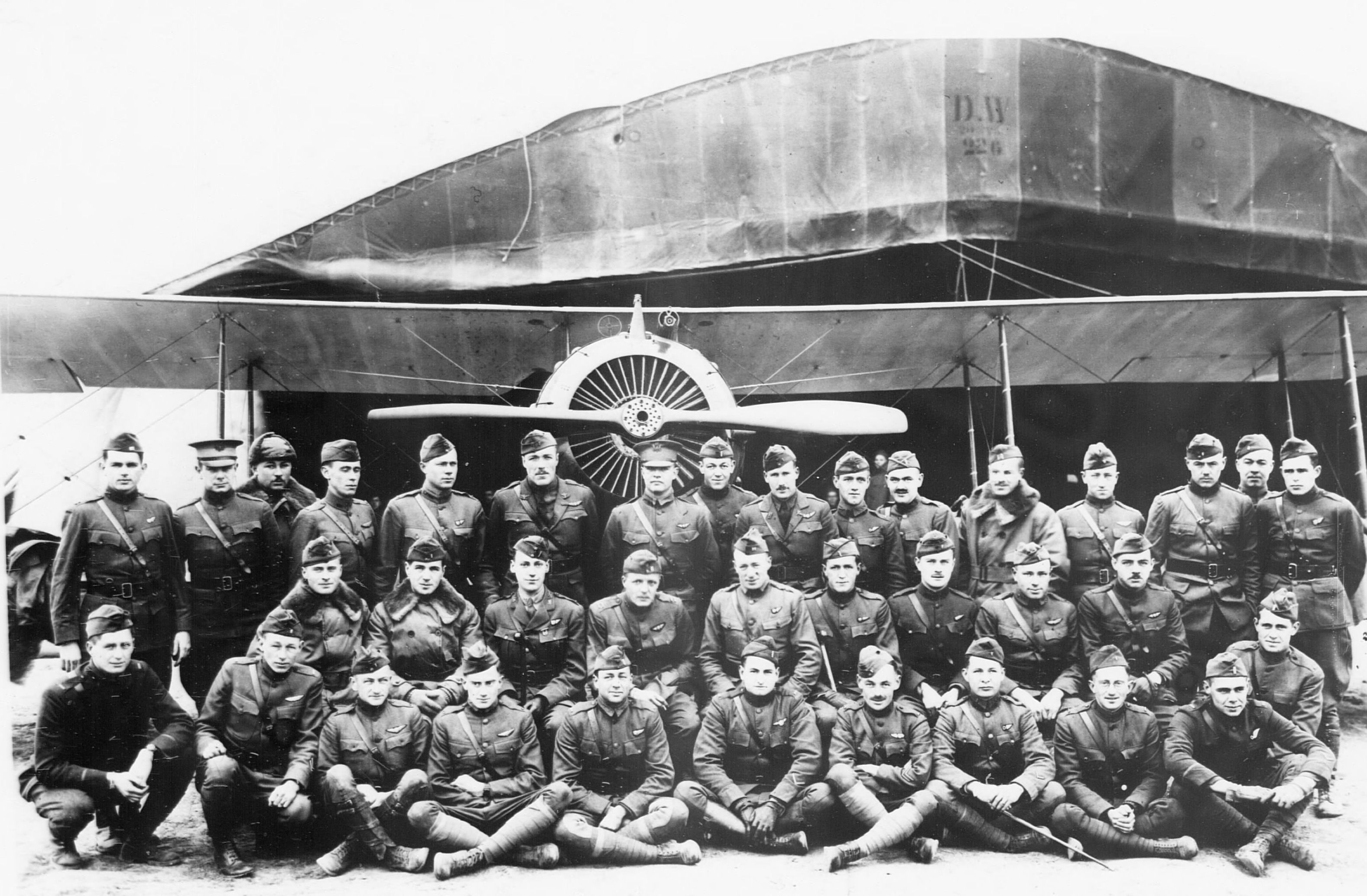
24th Aero Squadron, Vavincourt Aerodrome, France, November 1918

The 24th Fighter Squadron was formed in early June 1917 as the 19th Provisional Aero Squadron, drawing its personnel from Company F, Provisional Aviation School Squadron, which had been organized at Kelly Field, Texas on 1 May 1917. It became the 24th Aero Squadron on 14 June 1917. On 11 November 1917, the original squadron was divided, with half of the squadron being organized as the 185th Aero Squadron.

The unit deployed to England after the U.S. entry into World War I on 9 January 1918, and from there moved on to France after a training period in England, on 18 July 1918, positioned first at St. Maixent Replacement Barracks, and later at Ourches Aerodrome.

During its World War I service, the 24th was assigned to the First Army Observation Group. Its first combat mission came on 12 September 1918, and 13 more missions were flown during the preceding 10 days. The unit's first confirmed combat victory came on 15 September 1918 when 2nd Lt Roe E. Weils (Pilot) and 2nd Lt Albert W. Swmebroad (Observer) shot down a German aircraft. The unit also lost three aircraft during the same period, and of the crews from these aircraft, two men became Prisoners of War.

The unit went on to fly 155 missions from Gondreville and Vavincourt Aerodromes from 22 September 1918 during the Meuse-Argonne Offensive and claimed 11 aerial victories. Of these missions, 22 were termed "special combat missions" in which they were sent out by Army Headquarters to obtain aerial reconnaissance information most urgently needed to support ground operations, all of which were conducted at "extremely low altitude." For these special duties, teams were detached from the squadron and sent to Army Headquarters at Souilly Aerodrome between 9 and 18 October. On one such mission, 1st Lt. Raymond P. Dillon (Pilot) and 2nd Lt. John B. Lee III engaged nine enemy aircraft and claimed three of them.

After the November 1918 Armistice with Germany, the squadron was part of the Occupation of the Rhineland, returning to the United States on 1 October 1919 and being demobilized.

=== Panama Canal Defense ===
==== Interwar years ====
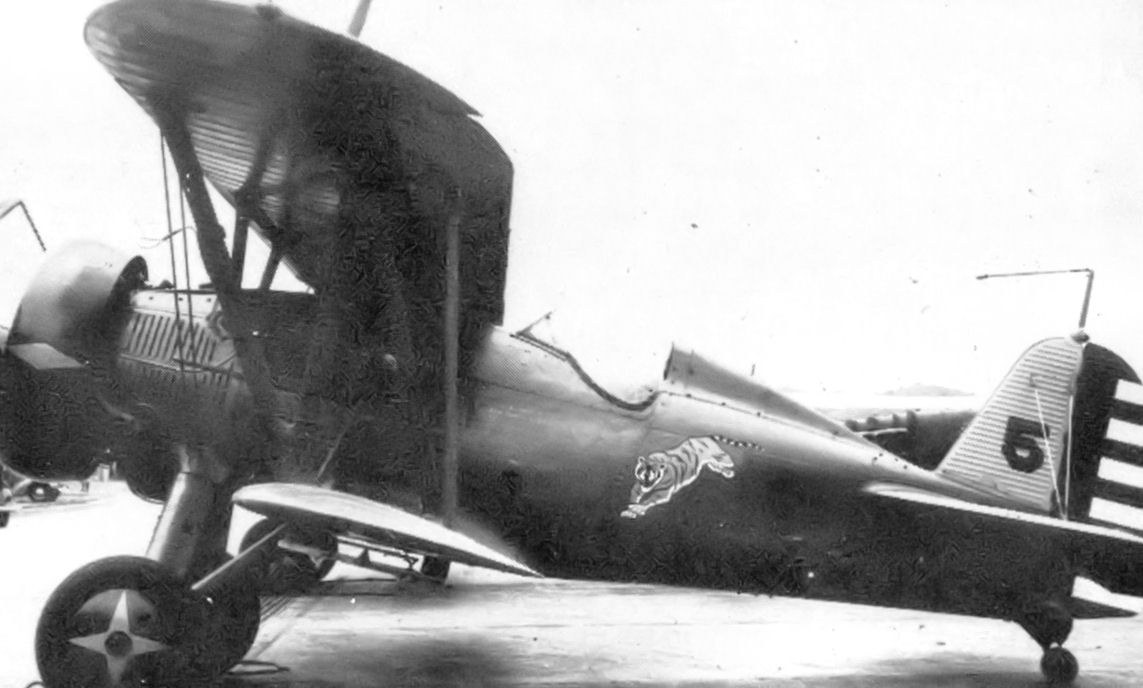
Boeing P-12E at Albrook Field, Canal Zone (Note: Probably a 1932 Serial, Squadron #5. Note squadron emblem prominent on fuselage. Taken about 1933.)

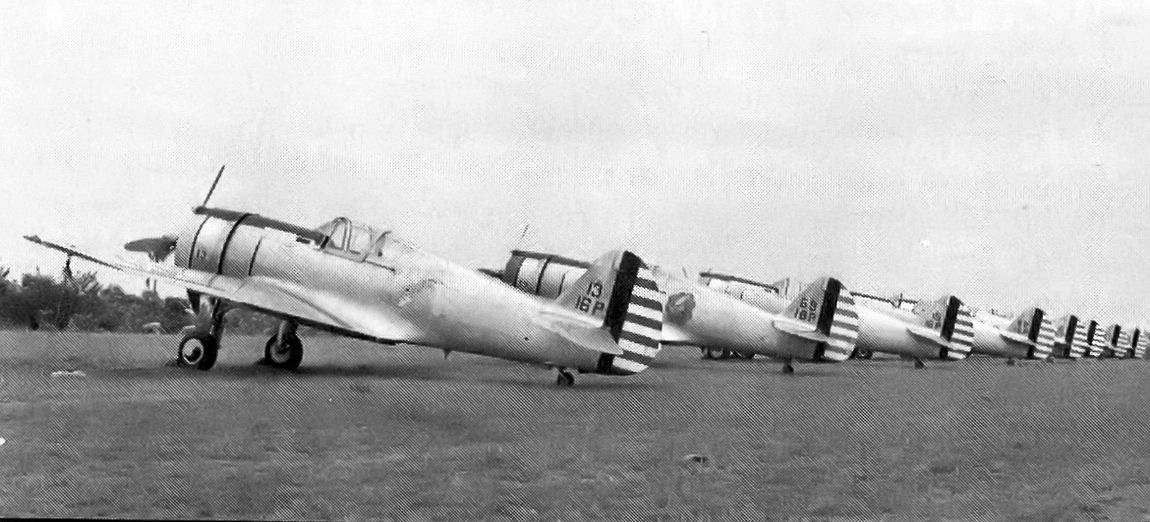
Eight Curtiss P-36A Hawks at Rio Hato Airfield in 1939 (Note: Identified aircraft are serials 38-13, 38-69 and 38-15.)

The 24th Squadron (Pursuit) was organized at Mitchel Field, New York, and assigned to the 6th Composite Group at France Field, Panama Canal Zone on 22 April 1922. Ground elements departed 30 April 1922 from the port of New York on the USAT Somme en route to the Canal Zone. Air elements concurrently departed Mitchel Field and arrived several days later at France Field, Panama Canal Zone. The squadron was redesignated the 24th Pursuit Squadron in 1923.

The unit remained at France Field until October 1932 when it moved to the newly completed Albrook Field, where it joined the 16th Pursuit Group, to which it had been assigned in 1930. For the rest of its existence, the squadron's mission was the defense of the Panama Canal. The squadron was redesignated, in keeping with the changes sweeping through the Army Air Corps, becoming the 24th Fighter Squadron on 15 May 1942.

The Great Depression in the United States and lack of funding to the United States Army Air Corps led to the fortunes of the unit being at a rather low ebb by 1 January 1939, at which time the squadron consisted of six flying officers and 93 other ranks, the Squadron was equipped with the Boeing P-26A Peashooter. With the breakout of World War II in Europe during September 1939, the Squadron was one of the first to be brought up to strength when, on 7 September 1939, 25 new Second Lieutenants arrived from Barksdale, Selfridge and Langley Fields in the United States. Between the date of their arrival and the Pearl Harbor Attack on 7 December 1941, 13 of these young officers were reassigned to other pursuit squadrons in the Canal Zone, and this marked the beginning of a policy whereby most of the squadrons of the 16th and 32d Pursuit Groups grew, almost literally, out of the 24th Pursuit Squadron.

In October 1939, the Squadron received word that it was to re-equip with the new Curtiss P-36A Hawks. By the end of 1939, the Squadron was at authorized strength with 12 P-36As (the squadron color was yellow at the time), one captain (the squadron commander), 11 Second Lieutenants and 142 enlisted ranks. The year 1940 passed in a series of training maneuvers, and personnel replacements and reassignments. Due to training accidents, as of 31 December 1940, the unit had but eight of its P-36A's left, and officer strength had dwindled to one captain, one first lieutenant and six second lieutenants, but enlisted strength had grown to 158. In June 1941, the Squadron received nine new Curtiss P-40C Warhawks and, with these, a number of long-range navigational flights were undertaken, one going so far as Trinidad.

==== World War II ====
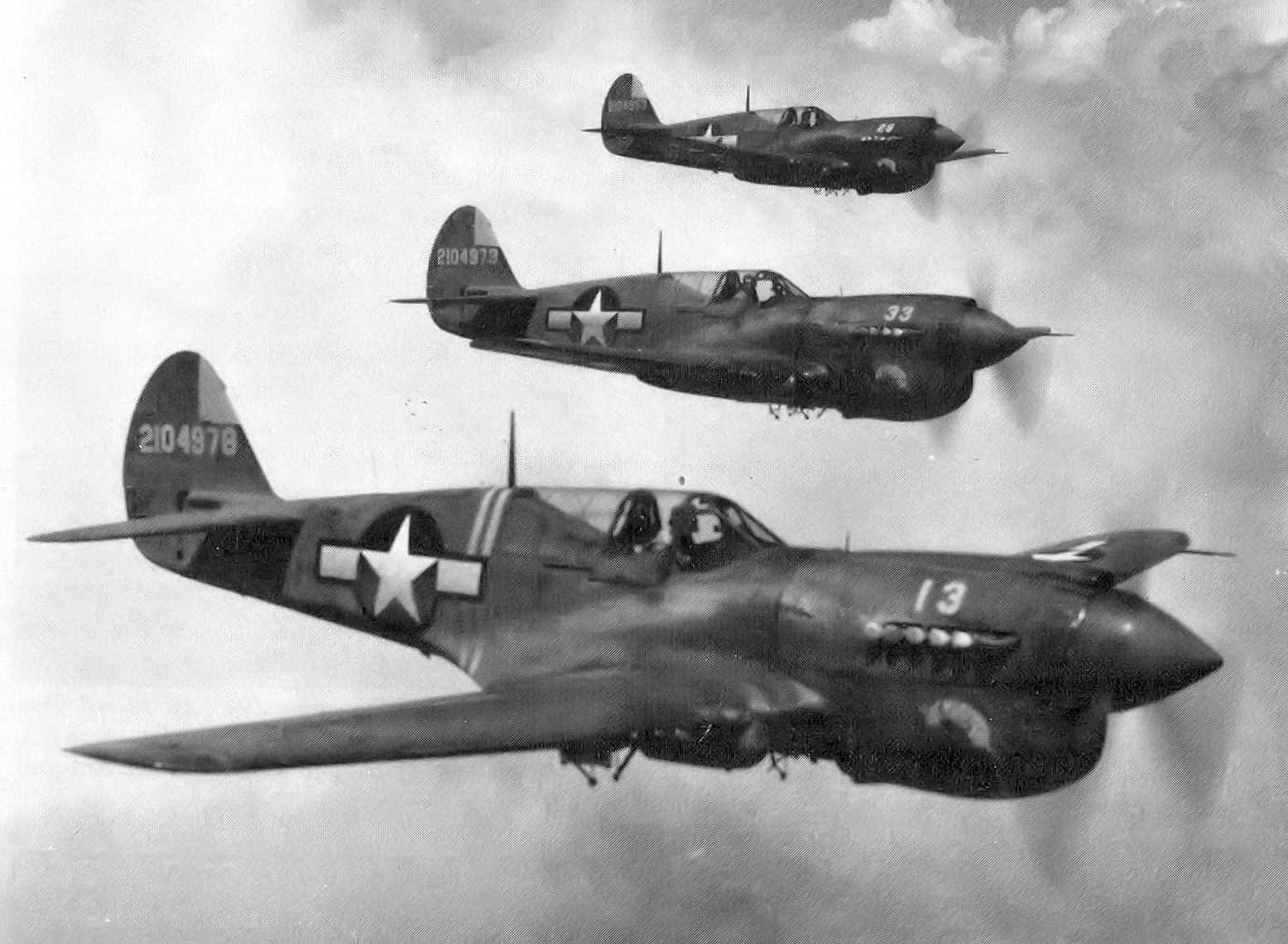
Three aircraft formation of squadron P-40N Warhawks (Note: Aircraft were operating from Madden Field, Panama. Serials 42-104978 (Squadron #13), 42-104973 (Squadron #33) and 42-104953 (Squadron #29).)

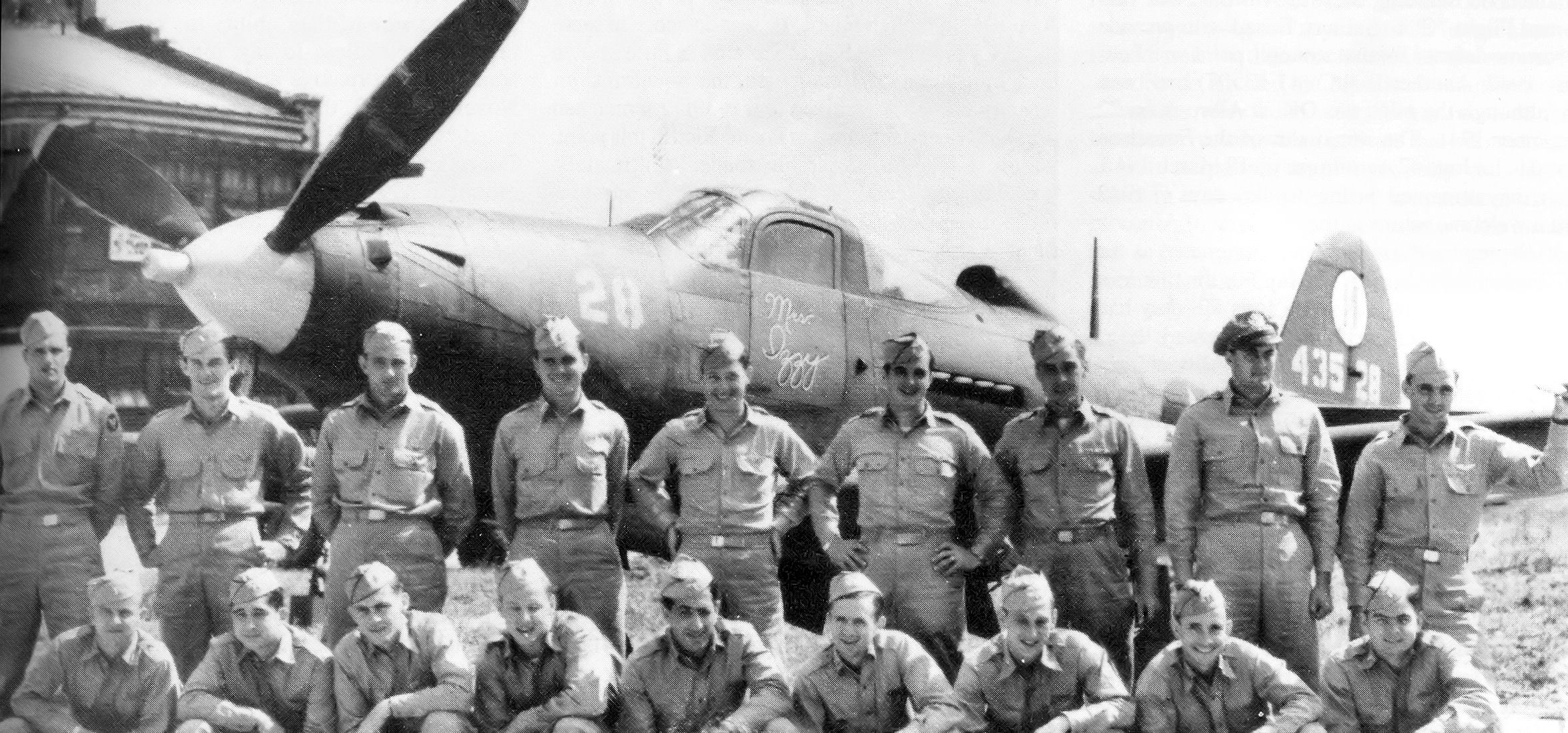
Squadron P-39 Airacobra (Note: Aircraft is Bell P-39Q-20-BE Airacobra, serial 44-3528 "Miss Izzy". Taken at France Field, Panama with squadron personnel in 1944.)

After the Pearl Harbor Attack in December 1941, the squadron initially remained on standing alert at Albrook, but dispatched C Flight to Salinas Airport, Ecuador, to provide local air defense for that strategic point on 2 February 1942. The remainder of the squadron moved to La Joya #2 Aerodrome 09°04′59″N 079°19′00″W on 12 March 1942, where they remained until returning to Albrook on 30 September. For the first four months that the unit was at La Joya #2, they had operated off the very primitive dirt runway there. This field was 25 miles north east of Albrook, just off the main Pan-American Highway to Chepo. It was, however, well situated as, just off the runway was heavy jungle growth, which offered excellent revetments and camouflage. The unit had also transitioned from its P-40C's to Bell P-39D Airacobras starting 2 May 1942, when it acquired ten of these aircraft From the 53d Fighter Group. The field at La Joya became flooded (due to the rainy season) in September 1942, forcing the return of the unit, somewhat ahead of schedule, to Albrook, where conditions were very crowded. By then, the P-39Ds had been exchanged for 14 P-39Ks.

On 15 October 1942, eight P-39Ks were dispatched on a mission near Rio Hato to graphically illustrate the effectiveness of the cannon-armed fighter as a ground-attack aircraft. The Airacobras attacked a column of derelict trucks positioned there and, when the dust settled, all but five of the 115 vehicles had been completely destroyed. In addition, between November 1942 and 11 January 1943, the squadron also had a solitary Douglas P-70 Havoc night fighter, which it maintained and operated on behalf of the XXVI Fighter Command at Albrook. This was the rather weak Sixth Air Force response to a concern over the lack of night fighter defenses for the Panama Canal.

The respite at Albrook was short-lived, however, as it had now become the policy of Sixth Air Force to rotate its fighter squadrons in and out of remote bases for practical as well as for morale purposes. Thus, on 17 January 1943, (with a total of 17 aircraft on hand) the squadron took up residence again at La Joya #2, following the arrival of the dry season, where it stayed until 28 May, when it returned once again, briefly, to Albrook. However, just prior to the return to Albrook on 24 May, 12 P-39K's flew in support of three Navy PT Boats in a simulated dive-bombing and strafing attack on two Navy destroyers some ten miles south east of Taborquilla Island.

The next move, however, was to Howard Field (after being yet again flooded out at La Joya), on 9 June 1943, although Flight E was detached to serve on Rey Island in the Bay of Panama on 15 June (Punta Coco Airfield, at the southern tip la Esmeralda peninsula). Also, the squadron received four P-39Ds which had previously been stationed at Losey Field, Puerto Rico. Fortunately, however, the Squadron flew its last P-39 missions on 25 June 1943 and, ironically, these were replaced on 27 June 1943 by two refurbished Curtiss P-40Cs and on 29 June two new P-40N Warhawks. From that point through until August, the squadron transitioned into new P-40N's, 22 of which were on hand by the end of that month. Meanwhile, the detachment at Rey Island (E Flight) was joined by F Flight, and these were amalgamated into one very large E Flight, still on Rey Island.

On 27 August 1943, flying their new P-40N's, A and B Flights flew a mass cross-country to Costa Rica. The next day, they flew down the Atlantic side of the Isthmus of Panama – completely undetected – and made a successful surprise "attack" on the Gatun Locks of the Panama Canal. B Flight made three dive-bombing attacks from 10,000 feet while A Flight made four strafing passes. Defending interceptors, finally alerted to the proceedings, didn't show up until the attack was completely over. Effective 1 November 1943, the squadron was assigned directly to the XXVI Fighter Command and, by 31 December, had totally re-equipped with P-4ON's.

The squadron was moved again to Madden Field (near Madden Dam) on 8 March 1944 and, shortly following, again re-equipped, this time with Bell P-39Q-5s and P-39Q-20s, and Piper L-4s and North American AT-6 Texans were also assigned. A "hack" Northrop RA-17 as well as a Curtiss RP-40C were also assigned. By March a single Vultee BT-13A Valiant had also been added, to augment the instrument training program. In July 1944, the squadron was once again tasked to make mock attacks on Panama Canal installations and, later in the same month, conducted very intensive interceptor exercises against various VI Bomber Command elements. By the end of that month, 23 P-39Q's were on hand, of which 21 were combat ready.

On 15 August 1944, the squadron moved again, this time to France Field and, by October, the unit had reached perhaps its highest state of combat readiness, with 23 of 24 P-39Q's airworthy, the highest percentage in XXVI Fighter Command at the time.

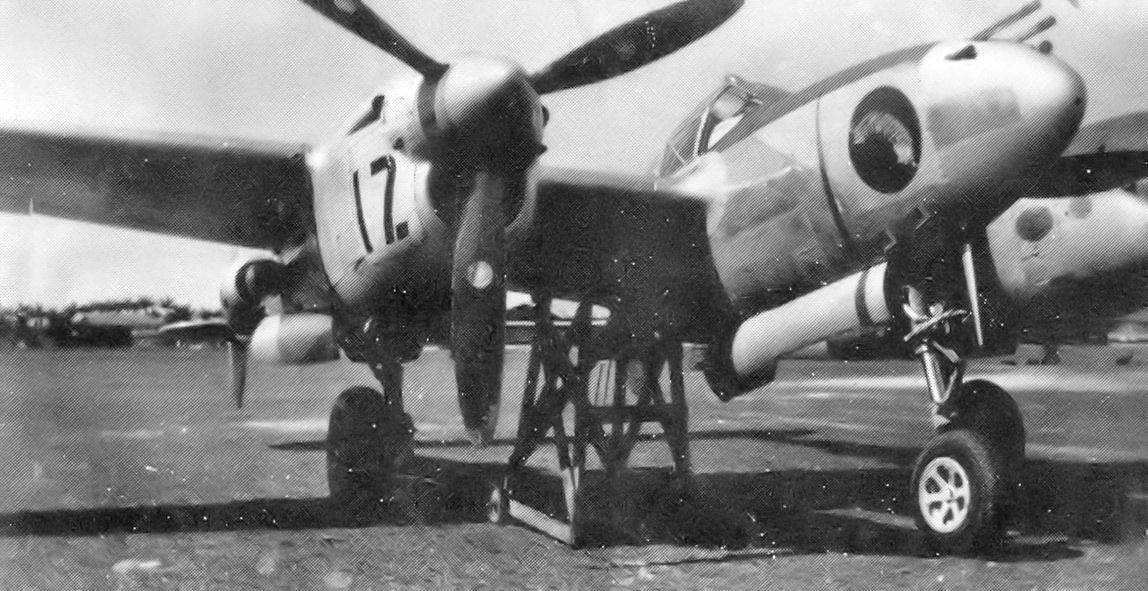
caption=P-38J Lightning (Squadron #12), France Field, Panama, 1945

In February 1945, the unit was redesignated as the 24th Fighter Squadron (Two Engine) and this signaled the advent of the sleek Lockheed P-38 Lightning into squadron service. The first P-38 known assigned was P-38J 44-23072, which also suffered a landing accident on 25 February 1945. The squadron moved once again, although the main body was still stationed at France Field, this time to Chame Field, Panama, and by March 1945 had a mixed strength consisting of 16 P-39Qs, 11 P-38Js, and single examples of the Cessna UC-78, North American AT-6F and a Vultee BT-13A. By June 1945, the P-38 Lightnings predominated, with 20 P-38s on hand and but five P-39Qs, although one of the P-38s was lost that month to an accident, the earlier P-38J's having been augmented by P-38Ls. A Beechcraft UC-45F was also assigned to the squadron to serve as a conversion trainer to twin-engined equipment, augmenting the UC-78.

With the end of the war in September 1945, the squadron reduced its activities, and many personnel were transferred back to the United States for separation. The squadron was placed in a non operational status on 1 November 1945, and inactivated on 15 October 1946. Its remaining aircraft were transferred to the 43d Fighter Squadron.

Combined Joint Task Force - Operation Inherent Resolve (CJTF-OIR)

In April 2023 the 24th Fighter Squadron deployed with the 457th Expeditionary Fighter Squadron to the 378 Air Expeditionary Wing. This marked a return to combat operations for the men and women of the 24 FS and the last operational deployment of the F-16C. The unit was selected for conversion to the F-35A.

=== Active associate squadron ===
The squadron was reactivated on 25 October 2019 at Naval Air Station Joint Reserve Base Fort Worth as an active duty associate unit of Air Force Reserve Command's 457th Fighter Squadron. At Carswell, it replaced the 355th Fighter Squadron, which moved to another base without personnel or equipment. The squadron is assigned to the 495th Fighter Group, which is located at Shaw Air Force Base, South Carolina. Its assigned pilots flew the General Dynamics F-16 Fighting Falcons of the 457th until late 2023. On October 1, 2023 the unit was recoded as the newest F-35A Fighter Squadron. The F-35A marks a significant milestone for the men and women of the 24th Fighter Squadron, the unit now hosts the most combat capable fighter aircraft in USAF history.

== Lineage ==
24th Aero Squadron

- Organized as 19th Aero Squadron (Provisional) c. June 1917

Redesignated 24th Aero Squadron on 14 June 1917
Redesignated 24th Aero Squadron (Observation) 22 August 1917
Demobilized on 1 October 1919
Consolidated with the 24th Pursuit Squadron on 8 April 1924

24th Fighter Squadron

- Constituted as the 24th Squadron (Pursuit) on 30 August 1921

Organized on 1 October 1921
Redesignated 24th Pursuit Squadron on 25 January 1923
Consolidated with the 24th Aero Squadron on 8 April 1924
Redesignated 24th Pursuit Squadron (Interceptor) on 6 December 1939
Redesignated 24th Fighter Squadron on 15 May 1942
Redesignated 24th Fighter Squadron (Two Engine) on 1 February 1945
Inactivated on 15 October 1946

- Redesignated 24th Fighter Squadron

Activated on 25 October 2019

=== Assignments ===
- Post Headquarters, Kelly Field, c. June 1917
- Aviation Concentration Center, January 1918
- American Expeditionary Forces, 24 January – 6 August 1918 (attached to Royal Flying Corps until 18 July 1918
- Replacement Concentration Center, AEF, 23 July 1918
- IV Corps Observation Group, 6 August 1918
- First Army Observation Group, 22 August 1918
- Third Army, 9 April 1919
- III Corps Observation Group, 6 May 1919 (attached to 2nd Infantry Division)
- American Forces in Germany, 2 July 1919
- Post Headquarters, Mitchell Field, 2 August 1919
- II Corps Area, 5 August – 1 October 1919
- Second Corps Area, 1 October 1921
- Panama Canal Department, 30 April 1922
- 6th Group (Observation) (later 6th Group (Composite), 6th Composite Group), 27 May 1922 (Note: Clay states that the squadron was relieved from assignment to the 6th Group on 8 May 1928. Clay, p. 1391. Maurer gives the year of this transfer as 1929. Maurer, Combat Squadrons, p. 127 (Maurer, Combat Units, p. 42. also states assignment to the 6th Group ended in 1929). Neither says to what headquarters the squadron was assigned. Ream indicates the assignment to the 6th continued until the squadron was reassigned to the 20th Pursuit Group. Ream, Factsheet. If the squadron was relieved from the 6th Group without formal reassignment, it would have transferred to the next higher headquarters, the Panama Canal Department.) (Note: For the various designations of the 6th Group, see Robertson, Patsy (27 June 2017). "Factsheet 6 Operations Group (AMC)". Air Force Historical Research Agency.)
- 20th Pursuit Group, 15 November 1930 (attached to 6th Composite Group)
- 3d Attack Wing, 16 June 1932 (attached to 6th Composite Group)
- 16th Pursuit Group (later 16th Fighter Group), 1 December 1932
- XXVI Fighter Command, 1 November 1943
- 6th Fighter Wing, 25 August – 15 October 1946
- 495th Fighter Group, 25 October 2019 – present

=== Stations ===
- Kelly Field, Texas, c. June – 28 December 1917
- Aviation Concentration Center, Garden City, New York, 3–9 January 1918
- Romney Rest Camp, Winchester, England, 24–31 January 1918
- RFC Wye, Kent, England, 31 Jan 1918;

Divided into training flights, 31 January – 11 May 1918

Flight A, RFC Wye
Flight B, RFC London Colney/RFC Croyden, South London
Flight C, RFC Sedgeford, Norfolk
FLight D, RFC Wyton, Huntingdonshire

- RFC Narborough, Norfolk, 11 May – 18 July 1918
- St. Maixent Replacement Barracks, France, 22 July 1918
- Ourches Aerodrome, France, 6 August 1918
- Gondreville-sur-Moselle Aerodrome, France, 22 August 1918
- Vavincourt Aerodrome, France, 22 September 1918 (detachment operated from Souilly Aerodrome, 9–18 October 1918, 27 October – 6 November 1918)
- Weissenthurm, Germany, 7 May – 14 July 1919
- Mitchel Field, New York], c. 2 August 1919
- Park Field, Tennessee, August – 1 October 1919
- Mitchel Field, New York, 1 October 1921 – 22 April 1922
- France Field, Panama Canal Zone, 30 April 1922
- Albrook Field, Panama Canal Zone, 26 October 1932
- La Joya Field, Panama, 15 March 1942
- Albrook Field, Panama Canal Zone, September 1942
- La Joya Field, Panama, 10 January 1943
- Albrook Field], Panama Canal Zone, 28 May 1943
- Howard Field, Panama Canal Zone, 9 June 1943
- Madden Field, Panama, 8 March 1944
- France Field, Panama Canal Zone, 15 August 1944 – 15 October 1946
- Naval Air Station Joint Reserve Base Fort Worth, 25 Oct 2019 – present

=== Aircraft ===
- Curtiss JN-4 Jenny, 1917
- Salmson 2A2, 1918-1919
- De Havilland DH-4, 1918–1919, 1922-1930
- Spad S.XIII, 1919
- Fokker D.VII, 1921–1922
- S.E.5 at various times during period 1922–1930
- Thomas-Morse MB-3 at various times during period 1922–1930
- Boeing PW-9, at various times during period 1922–1930
- Boeing P-12, 1930–1939
- Boeing P-26 Peashooter, 1938–1939
- Curtiss P-36 Hawk, 1936–1942
- Curtiss P-40 Warhawk, 1940–1944
- Bell P-39 Airacobra, 1942–1943, 1944–1945
- Douglas P-70 Havoc, 1942–1943
- Lockheed P-38 Lightning, 1945–1946
- Republic P-47 Thunderbolt, 1946
- General Dynamics F-16C Viper, 2019–2023
- Lockheed Martin F-35A Lightning II, 2024–present

== See also ==
- List of American aero squadrons
- Samuel Reeves Keesler
