= Science Bob =

American science communicator

Bob Pflugfelder
- Born: Westchester County, New York
- Other name: Science Bob
- Education: Emerson College
- Occupations: Author; Educator; Science communicator; Media personality
- Known for: Youth science education advocacy
- Notable work: Nick and Tesla series
- Television: Jimmy Kimmel Live
- Website: https://sciencebob.com

Bob Pflugfelder, known professionally as Science Bob, The Bob, or simply Pflugfelder is an American author, educator, and media personality, known primarily for his science advocacy on network TV talk shows. He has appeared on numerous live programs–including as a regular guest on Live with Kelly and Michael and Jimmy Kimmel Live!–and on the Nickelodeon series Nicky, Ricky, Dicky & Dawn. He has served as a public engagement partner or guest-speaker/-presenter for a number of schools, scientific initiatives, and institutions, in some cases alongside other notable science advocates, including Bill Nye, Tim Dodd, and Mark Rober.

== Biography ==
Bob Pflugfelder was born between 1967 and 1968. He was raised alongside his older sister, who is nine years his senior, in Westchester County, New York. His mother was a homemaker, his father a Wall Street banker. He spent his summers at Camp Becket in western Massachusetts, going on to serve on the camp's staff, and purchasing a home in the region later in life. He attended Emerson College in the late 1980s, studying television production. He has stated that it was during this period, while participating in a class project at a Boston elementary school, that he first thought he "might be destined to teach".

After graduating from Emerson, Pflugfelder moved to Los Angeles, hoping to work in the film and television industry. He eventually found work on The Jeff Foxworthy Show as a science tutor to actor Jonathan Lipnicki. Lipnicki's boxing coach was also named Bob, leading the crew to need to make a distinction between "Boxing Bob" and "Science Bob", creating the pseudonym Pflugfelder uses today. Pflugfelder would later tutor actors Rico Rodriguez of Modern Family and Erik Per Sullivan of Malcolm in the Middle during their time on their respective shows. Since then, he has served in various teaching roles, while making guest appearances on network television and at various STEM engagement initiatives across the United States. At various times in his career, Pflugfelder has appeared on The Today Show, Jimmy Kimmel Live!, Live with Kelly and Michael, Hack My Life, Good Morning America, and Home & Family, and at the USA Science & Engineering Festival, the World Science Festival, the White House Science Fair, and Maker Faire.

In 2014, speaking to The Boston Globe, Pflugfelder expressed interest in the creation of a program similar in format to Bill Nye the Science Guy, driven in part by the fact that by then "no major, popular TV show exclusively devoted to science for kids [had come into existence] since PBS's [Bill Nye] ended its run in 1998".

== Personal life ==
Pflugfelder holds five Guinness World Records. Additionally, he owns a log-cabin summer home in the Berkshires.

== Bibliography ==
- Nick and Tesla series (2016–2023)
