= Becket-Chimney Corners YMCA =

Summer camps for children in Western Massachusetts

Coordinates: 42.2918°N 73.0787°W

The Becket-Chimney Corners YMCA is a YMCA affiliated organization located in The Berkshires, specifically Becket, Massachusetts. There are three camps - Camp Becket for boys (est. 1903), Chimney Corners Camp for girls (est. 1931), and Becket Day Camp (est. 1991).

The cabins do not have electricity, and each camper area (villages for Camp Becket and units for Chimney Corners Camp) has a communal bathroom where kids shower and brush their teeth. In addition to group activities and team-building, campers engage in numerous individual activities, including sports, arts and crafts, drama, boating, ball and team games and nature activities.

During the off-seasons, there are work weekends, during which alumni, staff, and kids participate in work activities, such as wood chip spreading or fixing roofs. An alumni weekend provides an opportunity for alumni to reconnect. All of these events are hosted at Chimney Corners Camp because of the heated and insulated cabins. Camp Becket has recently constructed a new dining hall.

== Chapel ==
Chapel is a non-religious gathering that takes place on Sundays at both Camp Becket and Chimney Corners Camp (separately). Several campers and staff are chosen to give a speech on the theme. It is an outdoor event with a designated location by the lake at both camps.

== Opportunities for Older Participants ==
The Becket-Chimney Corners YMCA offers specialty programs for older campers, such as Construction cabins, for campers interested in carpentry and building skills, and the Adventure Odyssey cabin, for campers interested in rock climbing, bouldering, and backwoods camping. One new structure is completed each season. The Adventure Odyssey blends sport climbing using a ropes course, climbing tower, various top-roped chimneys on the property, and off-site climbing locations, with off-site camping and hiking. The focus of this program is group building and leave-no-trace camping techniques.

== Travel Service Programs ==
Each summer since 1963 (excpet 2020), the Becket-Chimney Corners YMCA has sent teenagers across the United States and around the world. Envoys are typically former Becket or Chimney Corner campers who have finished their sophomore year of high school. The International Camper Exchange Program (ICEP) focuses on service work and cultural exchange in countries such as Chile, Japan, New Zealand, Peru, Uruguay, Spain and Sweden, each of which lasts for 4–5 weeks. The Teen Leadership and Service (TLS) program combines biking and community service in Vermont and New York State. Yellowstone Adventure and Service (YAS) combines adventure activities and service work in Yellowstone National Park and the Grand Tetons.

== Leadership in Training Programs (LIT) ==
Aides Program The Aides program is an eight-and-a-half-week leader-in-training program offered to participants finishing their junior year in high school. Dr. Russell Irons started the current program in 1951 as the first step in the camp's leadership development program. Most summers see roughly 30 Aides, but it varies from year to year. The smallest number of Aides in one summer was 15 in 2026. The focus of the Aides Program is to learn how a resident camp operates by assisting in the office, camp store, infirmary, and kitchen. Aides also partake in lifeguard training and join cabin groups with an assigned mentor counselor to learn how to become better leaders.

REACH The REACH program was a co-ed program where participants were trained to become counselors solely in South Dakota. As of 2022, the REACH program has been combined with the Aides Program. The Aides stay in South Dakota for one to two weeks in partnership with the YMCA of the Seven Council Fires, spending time at Camp Marrowbone and Dupree Day Camp.

== Camp Becket ==
Camp Becket, also known as Camp Becket-in-the-Berkshires, is a YMCA summer camp for boys in the Berkshires of western Massachusetts. Founded in 1903 by George Hannum on Rudd Pond in Becket, Massachusetts, it is one of the oldest continually operational summer camps in the United States. The camp continues to teach core values espoused by its second director, Henry Gibson (tenure, 1904–1927).

These include the eight Becket Mottos:

- Do Your Best
- Play the Game
- Manners Maketh the Man
- Peace Through Understanding
- I Can and I Will
- Each for All—All for Each
- Better Faithful than Famous
- Help the Other Fellow

The camp is divided into four units, called villages, that each contain eight to ten cabins. From youngest to oldest, these are:

- Iroquois (cabins named after the American Indian tribes of the Iroquois League, and Algonquin and Erie)
- Pioneer (cabins named after famous explorers)
- Frontier (cabins named after U.S. Forts). It is also known as the Showcase Village because it is in the middle of the camp
- Ranger (cabins named after U.S. National Parks).

=== Songs ===
Becket has a tradition of singing songs in the dining hall after meals.

One of the oldest and most often sung songs at Becket is Four Miles Up, sung in a gospel or traditional version:

Four Miles Up

Four miles up,

Four miles down,

Four miles away from Becket Town,

Guess it's worth the four mile tramp

With a Ra Ra Ra for Becket Camp!

Other traditional Becket songs include Becket in the Berkshires, "Oh, Sweet Becket", Sons of Noble Living, Try to Remember, Pink Pajamas, Mountain Dew, Becket Way, "Beckets for me", "Puff", "If I had a hammer", The Canoe Song, and many songs from the Big Show. The most traditional Becket song is Amici, a song about friendship written by one of the camp directors' wives. The song is only sung after all camp activities, such as campfires and talent shows.

=== Notable alumni ===
- Jon Lucas - writer of several screenplays, including The Hangover, Four Christmases, and Ghosts of Girlfriends Past.
- Paul Dudley White - personal physician of President Dwight D. Eisenhower
- David Putnam - U.S. Army lieutenant and WW1 Flying Ace
- Timothy Geithner - Former U.S. Treasury Secretary
- Welles Crowther - Equities trader who saved at least nine on 9/11. While running back into the South Tower with NYFD personnel to save more people, Welles died in the tower's collapse. Also known as "the man in the red bandana."
- Peter Sagal - Host of NPR's quiz show Wait Wait... Don't Tell Me!
- David Blatt - Princeton basketball star and former head coach of the Cleveland Cavaliers
- "Science" Bob Pflugfelder - Author, science communicator, and regular guest on Jimmy Kimmel Live!

== Chimney Corners Camp ==
Part of the Becket Chimney Corners YMCA, Chimney Corners is a sister camp to Camp Becket situated about a mile away, on Smith Pond. The camp Chimney Corners offers many opportunities for campers, including horseback riding, tennis, soccer, and many other sports and arts activities. The camp is divided into three different age groups: The Junior Unit (with cabins named after famous ships), for ages 7–11; The Intermediate Unit (cabins named after mythical places), for ages 11–13; and the Senior Unit (named after constellations), for ages 13–15. The camp is divided into two four week sessions, although the youngest campers have the opportunity to stay for just two weeks as part of the starter program. Campers in the oldest age group can also participate in construction cabins and Adventure Odyssey was reinstated for Chimney Corners in 2014.

Chimney Corners also has its own set of mottos:

Agape: Unconditional love for all of humanity

PACE: Positive Attitude Changes Everything

HELPS: Healthy Living, Empowering Girls and Women, Leadership and Learning, Positive Relationships, and Social Responsibility.

Chimney Corners is also rich with traditions. These include song and dance competitions called Wiff N' Poof and Song and Sign, a 5K color run during first session, and Chimney Palooza, a dance party run by the Aides, during second session.

=== Reach ===
Initiated in 1991, the primary goal of the REACH Program is to help teens develop leadership skills through a service-oriented experience, based in a Lakota Sioux community in South Dakota. The services heighten the importance of volunteer service for the benefit of others. The REACH Program incorporates visits to pow-wows, Badlands National Park, Wounded Knee, Mount Rushmore, and the Crazy Horse Memorial.

In the southwestern corner of the Cheyenne River Reservation, participants stay in the Red Scaffold community center. Red Scaffold is a small town consisting of 15–30 homes, churches, cemeteries, and playgrounds with a population of approximately 100-150 people. REACH groups also partner with the Sioux YMCA located in the town of Dupree.

Starting in 2022, the REACH program merged with the Aides program. All Chimney Corners Aides participate in a two-week version of REACH, referred to as 'SoDak'.
