= Air Aces =

- Genre: Documentary
- Original language: English
- No. of seasons: 1 (ongoing)
- No. of episodes: 6

Production
- Running time: 60 minutes
- Production company: Cineflix Inc.

Original release
- Network: History
- Release: September 20, 2012 – February 2013

Air Aces is a Cineflix produced series that airs on History channel in Canada. The series originally aired in the UK titled Heroes of the Skies on September 20, 2012. The series premiered in Canada as Air Aces on January 7, 2013 on History and also aired on Military Channel later in 2013. The show tells the stories of the most heroic airborne combat missions in history. The series uses real vintage aircraft and re-creates mid-air combat sequences. Featuring Spitfires, Lancaster bombers, and Phantom fighters and aerial stunt teams, the series dramatizes the exploits of the world's greatest Air Aces. The series also features interviews with the last surviving veterans and military historians and rare archival footage.

== Alternative titles ==
Air Aces is called Heroes of the Skies in the United Kingdom and airs on Channel 5.

== Episodes ==
=== Season 1 ===
==== Episode 1 - George Beurling ====
Canadian George Beurling broke every rule in the book yet became one of the greatest fighter pilots of World War II. The part of George Beurling is played by British actor Adam Drew.

==== Episode 2 - Douglas Bader ====
Using bold but controversial tactics, Douglas Bader beats all the odds to help turn the tide in the Battle of Britain and become Britain's most celebrated air ace. The part of Douglas Bader is played by British actor Mark Stanley.

==== Episode 3 - Wing Walker ====
The crew of Lancaster ME669 had one of the most dangerous jobs in the Air Force, but the tactic called "total war" overshadowed their legacy. Yet, for the more than one hundred thousand volunteers – half of who would not return – there was no other option.

==== Episode 4 - Red Tails ====
Pressure from African-American activist groups pushed President Franklin D. Roosevelt to initiate a Blacks-only fighter pilot training program during World War II. What happened next gave birth to a potent fighting force against Nazi Germany and change the course of American history.

==== Episode 5 - Robin Olds ====
In July 1966, North Vietnam's fleet of MiG-21s is hammering the US Air Force. With the help of his pilots, Colonel Robin Olds masterminds Operation Bolo; a death-defying bait-and-switch tactic that he hopes will wipe out the MiGs once and for all.

==== Episode 6 - Gabby Gabreski ====
Against the backdrop of World War II, American pilots race to shoot down the most German planes and be crowned the countries top-flying ace. US Air Force Pilot Francis Gabby Gabreski makes it his personal mission to be the best there ever was.
