= Taborcillo =

Private island off the coast of Panama

Coordinates: 8°40′20″N 79°44′39″W

Geography
- Location: Gulf of Panama

Administration
- Panama
- Province: Panamá Province

Isla Taborcillo (sometimes described as John Wayne Island) is a small private island 2 kilometres (1 mile) off the coast of Panama, which was once owned by American film actor John Wayne. Currently owned by Austrian businessman Ralph Hübner, founder of publishing company Hübner Who is Who Verlag für Personenenzyklopädien AG, the island contains a resort hotel and theme park, and is a vacation destination for tourists. A part of the island has been designated as a protected bird sanctuary; egrets, brown pelicans and hummingbirds nest here.

== Environment ==
The island, along with the mangroves and mudflats of the encompassing Chame Bay, has been designated an Important Bird Area (IBA) by BirdLife International because it supports significant numbers of many waterbirds as well as a breeding colony of white ibises. Other resident birds include tricolored herons, great and snowy egrets and yellow-crowned night-herons. Olive Ridley, hawksbill and green sea turtles nest on the island’s beaches.

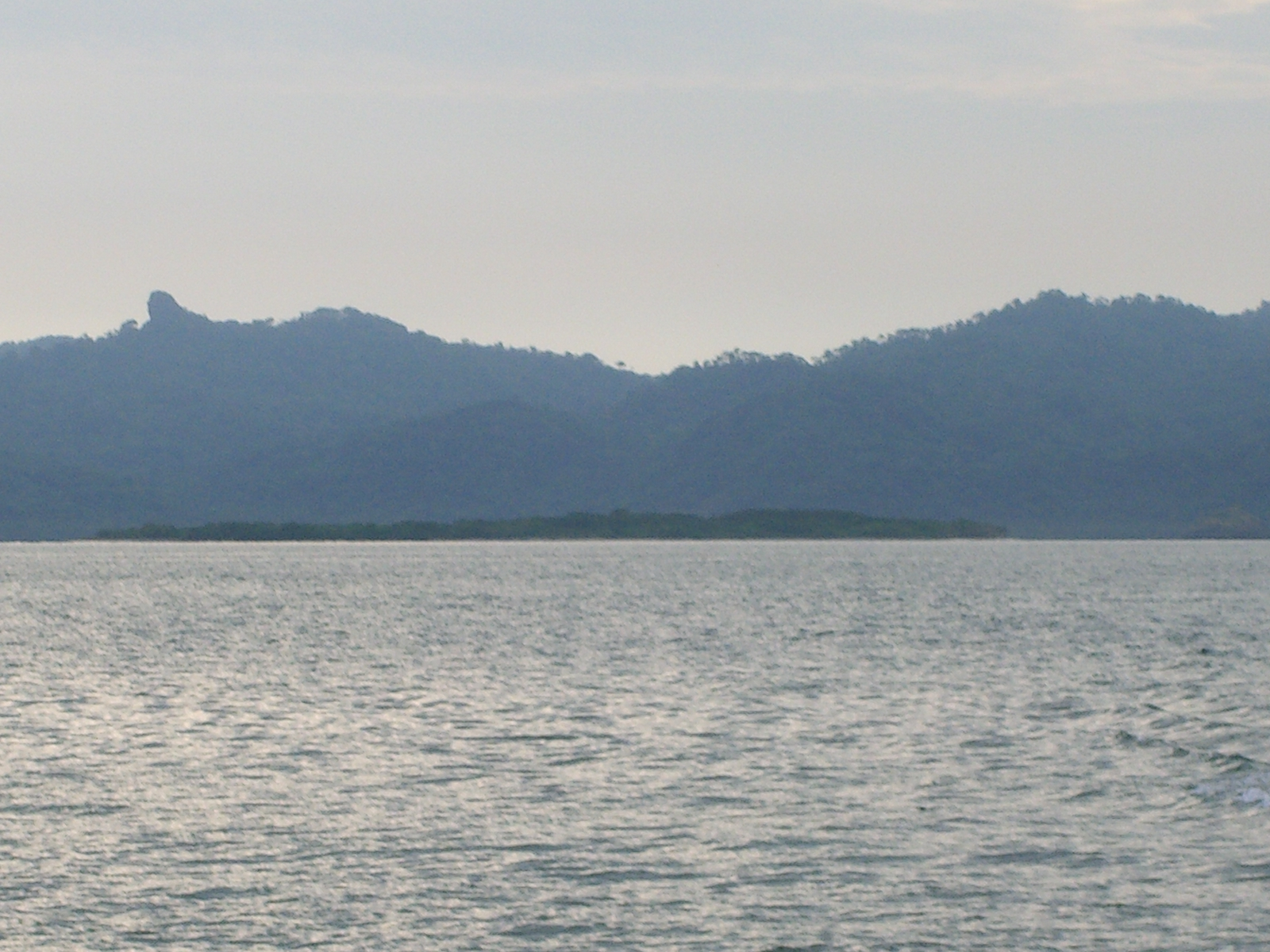
Picture of Isla Taborcillo a.k.a. John Wayne Island, off the coast of Panama

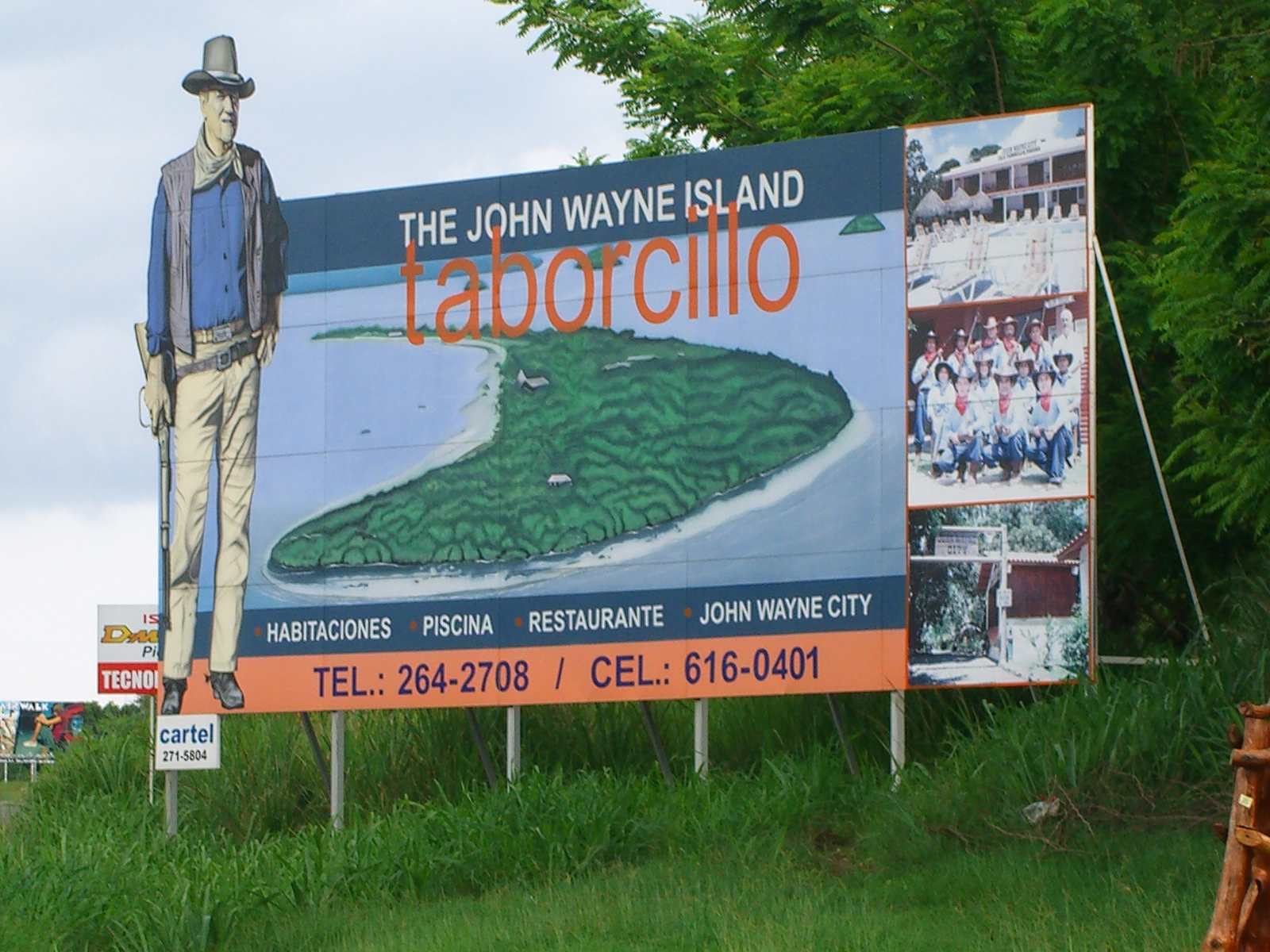
Roadside sign on the way to John Wayne Island
