= 2nd Pursuit Group =

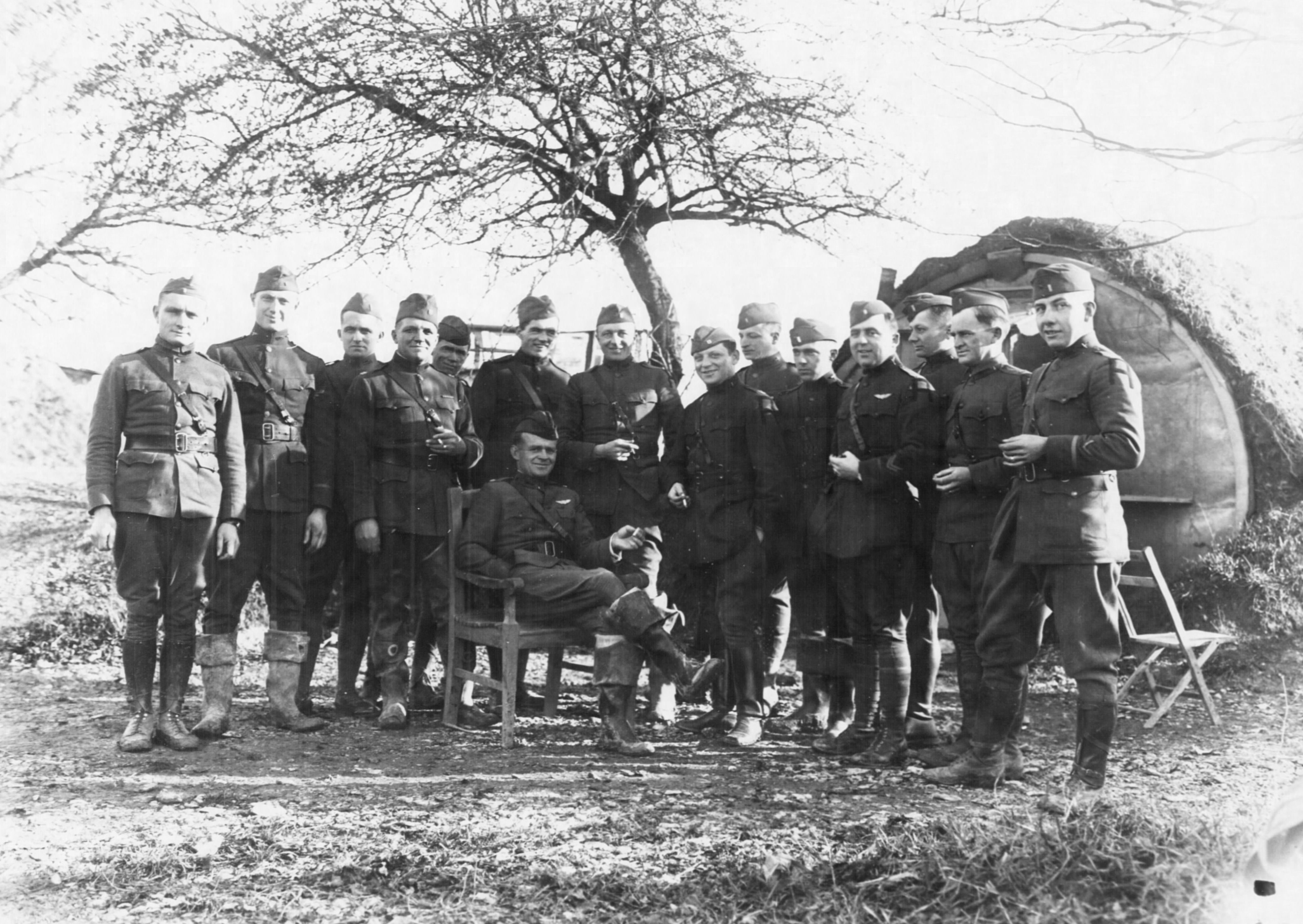
- Staff of the 2nd Pursuit Group, Belrain Aerodrome, France
- Active: 1918–1919
- Country: United States
- Branch: Air Service, United States Army
- Type: Group
- Role: Command of pursuit squadrons
- Part of: American Expeditionary Forces (AEF)
- Engagements: World War I: St. Mihiel Offensive Campaign; Meuse-Argonne Offensive Campaign

The 2nd Pursuit Group was an Air Service, United States Army unit that fought on the Western Front during World War I as part of the Air Service, First United States Army. It was demobilized in France on 10 April 1919. There is no modern United States Air Force unit that shares its lineage and history.

== History ==
The group was organized on 29 June 1918 at Croix de Metz Aerodrome, Toul, France. The 13th Aero Squadron was initially the only unit assigned. The 2nd Pursuit Group immediately began operations against the enemy. The 139th Aero Squadron was assigned to the group the next day, and by 16 August the 13th and 22nd Aero Squadrons filled out the unit's complement of squadrons. All the group's squadrons were equipped with French SPAD S.XIIIs. In theory the group totaled 72 aircraft and an equal number of pilots. The reality was that it was rare for the number of pilots to equal the number of aircraft or for the aircraft to be fully standardized across the entire group. The 28th Aero Squadron was assigned to the Group on 6 November.

When the armistice with Germany was signed and hostilities ceased at 11:00 on 11 November 1918, the pilots of the group had flown 7,788:21 hours in combat over enemy territory. In the 111 flying days made possible by the weather, 358 pilots engaged the enemy in 166 air battles with the loss of 30 pilots. During the 166 air battles, 132 victories were credited to the pilots of the group, with 16 flying aces having the destruction of five or more enemy aircraft to their credit. In addition, four pilots of the group were decorated with the Distinguished Service Cross.

=== Lineage ===
- Organized as the 2nd Pursuit Group on 29 June 1918

Demobilized on 11 December 1918

=== Assignments ===
- First Army Air Service, 29 June 1918
- 1st Pursuit Wing, 6 July 1918

=== Components ===
- 13th Aero Squadron (Pursuit), 28 June 1918 – 5 December 1918
- 22nd Aero Squadron (Pursuit), 16 August 1918 – 11 December 1918
- 28th Aero Squadron (Pursuit), 6 November 1918 – 11 December 1918
- 49th Aero Squadron (Pursuit), 2 August 1918 – 5 December 1918
- 103rd Aero Squadron (Pursuit), 4 July 1918 – 7 August 1918
- 139th Aero Squadron (Pursuit), 30 June 1918 – 11 December 1918

=== Stations ===
- Croix de Metz Aerodrome, Toul, France, 29 June – 23 September 1918
- Belrain Aerodrome, France, 23 September 1918 – 11 December 1918

== See also ==
- Organization of the Air Service of the American Expeditionary Force
