= Edward Meeker Haight =

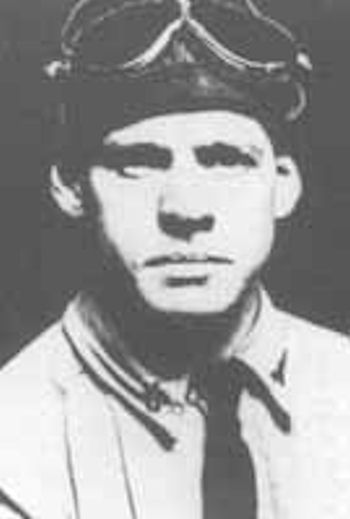
- Edward Meeker Haight, 1918
- Born: May 30, 1896; Astoria, New York, U.S.
- Died: December 5, 1975 (aged 79); Saint Petersburg, Florida, U.S.
- Relatives: Son Edward MIA in 1944
- Military career
- Allegiance: United States
- Branch: Air Service, United States Army; United States Army Air Forces; United States Air Force
- Rank: Colonel
- Unit: Air Service, United States Army: 139th Aero Squadron
- Commands: 30th Air Service Group, Randolph AFB
- Conflicts: World War I World War II
- Other work: Last World War I ace to serve in U.S. Air Force

Colonel Edward Meeker Haight (May 30, 1896—December 5, 1975) was a flying ace when he served as a lieutenant in World War I. He was credited with five aerial victories, all against German fighter planes.

== World War I service ==
Haight scored his victories in just over a month, from 28 September through 30 October 1918 flying a Spad.

== Between the World Wars ==
Postwar, Haight pursued a career in the U.S. Flying Service although he interrupted his employment at some point for approximately six years. He flew as an airline pilot in Central America, and having maintained his military reserve force commission was recalled to Active duty for World War II.

== World War II and beyond ==
During World War II, he rose to the rank of colonel and briefly commanded Randolph AFB in 1942. In 1950, having been culled from the officer's ranks he chose to enlist as a noncommissioned officer rather than leave the military; this allowed him to complete his 30 years for retirement. He retired on 3 May 1954 at Randolph AFB, after serving four years as a master sergeant in the School of Aviation Medicine.

== Relation ==
His son 2nd Lt Edward Haight was Missing in action on 18 July 1944 during World War II.

== See also ==
- List of World War I flying aces from the United States

== Bibliography ==
- Over the Front: A Complete Record of the Fighter Aces and Units of the United States and French Air Services, 1914-1918. Norman L. R. Franks, Frank W. Bailey. Grub Street, 1992. ISBN 0-948817-54-2, ISBN 978-0-948817-54-0.
- SPAD XII/XIII Aces of World War I. Jon Guttman. Osprey Publishing, 2002. ISBN 1-84176-316-0, ISBN 978-1-84176-316-3.
