= Robert Opie Lindsay =

American World War I fighter ace (1893–1952)

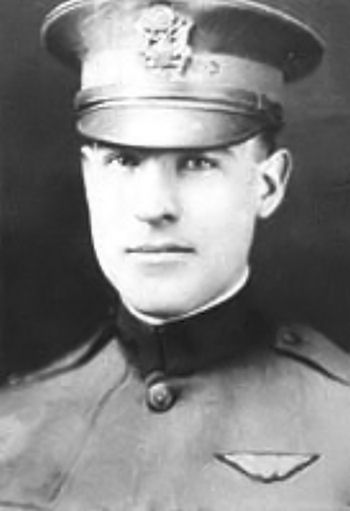
- Robert Opie Lindsay, 1918
- Born: 25 December 1894; Madison, North Carolina, United States
- Died: 1 August 1952 (aged 57); Fort Worth, Texas, United States
- Military career
- Allegiance: United States
- Branch: Air Service, United States Army
- Rank: Lieutenant
- Unit: 139th Aero Squadron
- Conflicts: World War I World War II
- Awards: Distinguished Service Cross
- Other work: Founding member of Civil Aeronautics Administration

Lieutenant (later Colonel) Robert Opie Lindsay (25 December 1894 – 1 August 1952) was an American World War I flying ace credited with six aerial victories in the closing days of the war. He returned to duty during World War II; at one point he commanded Fort Sill, Oklahoma as well as starting the National Air Guard of Oklahoma .

== Biography ==
=== Early life ===
Lindsay was born on December 25, 1894. He attended North Carolina State University and majored in textiles while also being a member of the basketball team. He also served as business manager of the school paper and editor of the Agromeck. He became the only North Carolina-born pilot to earn the distinction of flying ace, with six confirmed kills in air battles, while twice being shot down from 20,000 feet. His brother was William "Bill" Lindsay who played major league baseball for the Cleveland Naps.

=== Service in World War I ===
Lindsay joined the U.S. Signal Corps in 1917. After training in the U.S. and France, he was shipped off to the 139th Aero Squadron. He was slightly wounded on the first day of the Battle of Saint-Mihiel, but recovered to help shoot down two Pfalz D.IIIs on 18 September 1918. He would score four more victories in the remaining weeks of the war, and be awarded the Distinguished Service Cross. His citation tells the tale:

"The Distinguished Service Cross is presented to Robert Opie Lindsay, First Lieutenant (Air Service), U.S. Army, for extraordinary heroism in action near Bantheville, France, October 27, 1918. In company with two other planes, Lieutenant Lindsay attacked three enemy planes (Fokker type) at an altitude of 3,000 meters, and after a sharp fight brought down one of them. While engaged with the two remaining machines, eight more planes (Fokker type) came at him from straight ahead. He flew straight through their formation, gained an advantageous position, and brought down another plane before he withdrew from the combat. General Orders No. 46, W.D., 1919"

=== Service during World War II ===
Lindsay returned to his nation's service during World War II. After joining the U.S. Army Air Corps, he rose to the rank of Colonel and commanded Fort Sill, Oklahoma. He retired in 1945.

=== After World War II ===
He then became a founding member of the Civil Aeronautics Administration (United States), and helped foster Berry Field, which became Nashville International Airport.

Robert Opie Lindsay died on 1 August 1952 in a Fort Worth, Texas hospital after undergoing surgery on 24 July. He was survived by his wife, two daughters, two brothers, and a sister.

== See also ==
- List of World War I flying aces from the United States

== Bibliography ==
- Over The Front: The Complete Record of the Fighter Aces and Units of the United States and French Air Services, 1914-1918 . Norman Franks, Frank Bailey. Grub Street Publishing, 2008. ISBN 0948817542 ISBN 978-0948817540
