= Joseph T. McNarney =

US Army general (1893–1972)

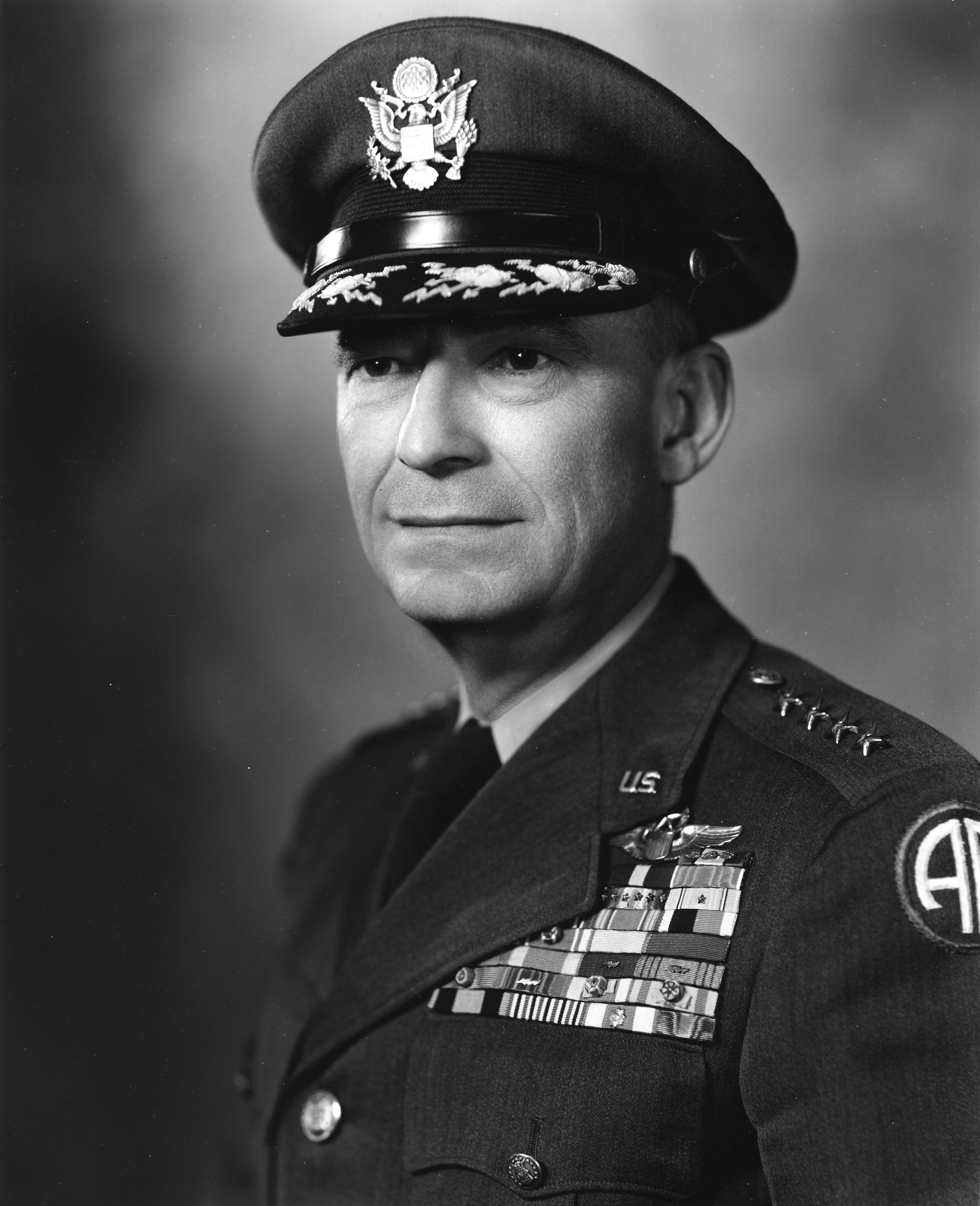
- McNarney in the 1950s
- Born: 28 August 1893; Emporium, Pennsylvania, U.S.
- Died: 1 February 1972 (aged 78); La Jolla, California, U.S.
- Burial place: Forest Lawn Memorial Park
- Spouse: Helen Wahrenberger McNarney
- Military career
- Allegiance: United States of America
- Branch: United States Army (1915–47); United States Air Force (1947–52)
- Service years: 1915–1952
- Rank: General
- Commands: Air Materiel Command; United States Forces of Occupation in Germany; Deputy Chief of Staff of the United States Army; United States Army Europe; United States Army Forces, Mediterranean Theater; 7th Bombardment Group; Second Army Observation Group; VI Corps Observation Group; 1st Corps Observation Group
- Conflicts: World War I World War II
- Awards: Army Distinguished Service Medal (5); Navy Distinguished Service Medal; Legion of Merit

Joseph Taggart McNarney (28 August 1893 – 1 February 1972) was a four-star general in the United States Army and in the United States Air Force, who served as Military Governor of occupied Germany.

== Early life ==
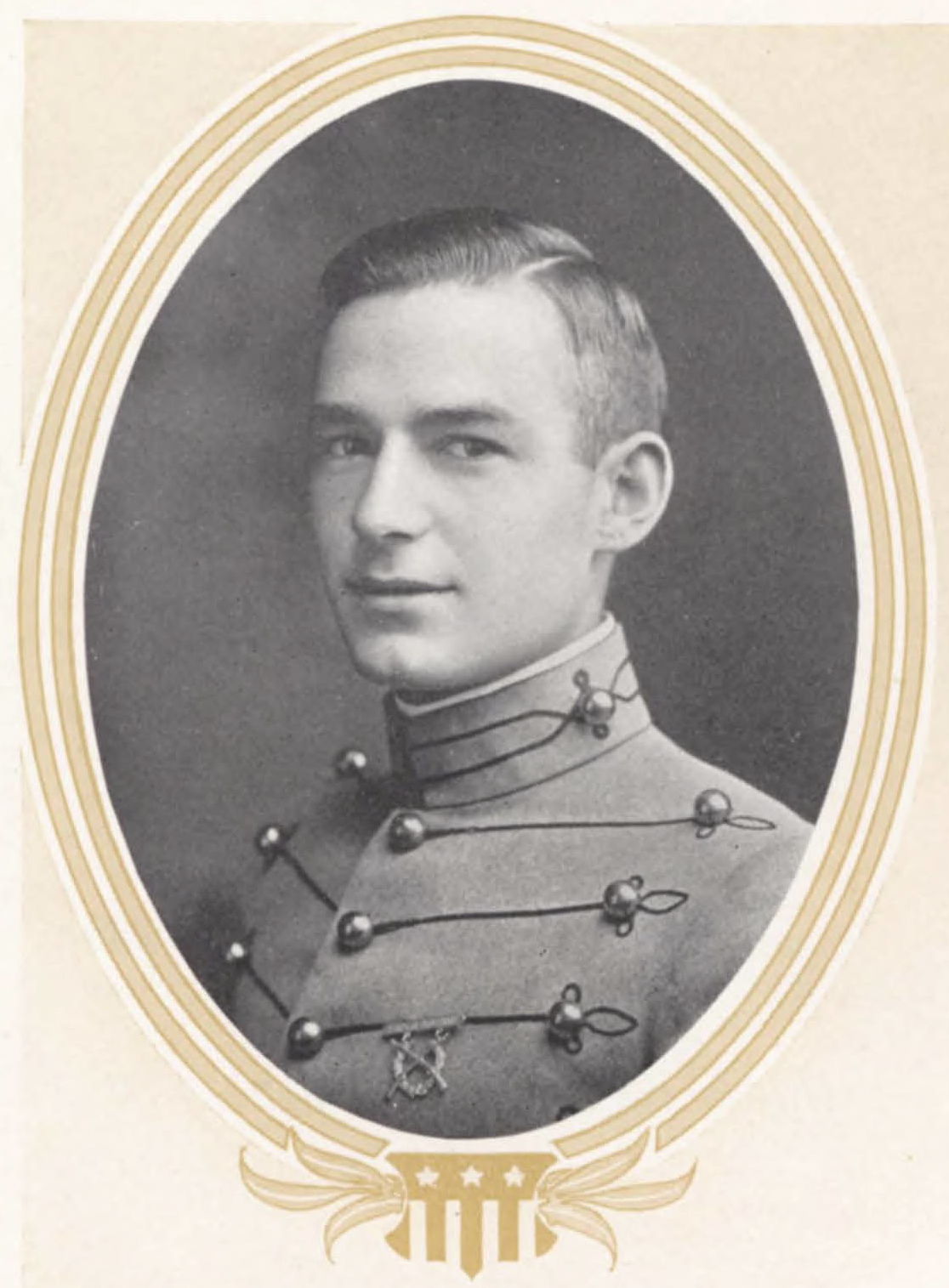
At West Point in 1915

Joseph Taggart McNarney was born on 28 August 1893, in Emporium, Pennsylvania. He graduated from the United States Military Academy in June 1915 (as part of "the class the stars fell on") and was commissioned as a second lieutenant of Infantry. McNarney served with the 21st Infantry at Vancouver Barracks, Washington, and the 37th Infantry at Yuma, Arizona. In July 1916, he became a first lieutenant and began flight training at the Signal Corps Aviation School in San Diego, California. A year later, he was rated as a Junior Military Aviator and detailed to the Aviation Section, U.S. Signal Corps. He served as an instructor in meteorology and radio telegraphy. McNarney was promoted to captain in May 1917 and posted to the 1st Aero Squadron at Columbus, New Mexico, until August 1917.

== Military career ==
=== World War I ===
McNarney went to France in August 1917. After two weeks as a student at the French Flying School at Avord, he served four months at Issoudun, where the 1st Aero Squadron was helping organize an aviation instruction school for the Air Service AEF, and at Amanty. He was an observer at the front with the 4th French Army at Chalons-sur-Marne for a week before becoming director of the 2d Corps Aeronautical School in February and March 1918. In April, McNarney served as a member of the staff of the Assistant Chief of Air Service, Zone of the Advance until May 8. He was then made a flight commander in the 1st Aero Squadron, where he led observation flights in the Toul sector for two months. He was promoted to major in June 1918 and flew with the IV Corps Observation Group in July.

During the Chateau Thierry offensive, he both commanded the 1st Corps Observation Group and served as chief of the III Corps' air service. After two weeks of staff duty assisting in the organization of the new First Army Air Service in August, he commanded the IV Corps Observation Group during the St. Mihiel offensive and the V Corps Observation Group during the Meuse-Argonne Offensive. With the formation of the Second Army Air Service in October 1918, he became Air Service officer to the VI Corps and later commanded the VI Corps Observation Group to February 1919, when he became commanding officer of the Second Army Observation Group. In April 1919, McNarney was attached to the American Expeditionary Force Headquarters in Paris to write a manual on air observation and was promoted to lieutenant colonel in May.

=== Between the wars ===
McNarney returned to the United States in October 1919 to take charge of the flying school at Gerstner Field, Louisiana. McNarney experienced the chaotic ups and downs in rank common to Regular officers following the reorganization of the Army by the National Defense Act of 1920. He first reverted to his permanent rank of captain of Infantry on 21 February 1920. On 1 July 1920, when the Air Service became a combatant arm of the line, he transferred to the Air Service as a captain, then was promoted to major on the same date by virtue of a provision in the National Defense Act that allowed officers who earned their rank in service with the AEF to retain it. On 4 November 1922, he was discharged when Congress set a new ceiling on the number of majors authorized in the Air Service. He was reappointed as a captain, then promoted again to major on 16 June 1924.

McNarney went to Langley Field, Virginia, in November 1920 as a student in the Air Service Field Officers School and remained there as an instructor until 1925. McNarney graduated with honors in June 1926 from the Command and General Staff School at Fort Leavenworth, Kansas. The Air Service became the Air Corps in July and McNarney served the next three years in the Air Section of the Military Intelligence Division of the War Department General Staff. In August 1930, he completed the Army War College course and went to March Field, California, as commandant of the Air Corps Primary Flying School, moving with it to Randolph Field, Texas. He succeeded Major Carl A. Spaatz as commanding officer of the 7th Bomb Group in October 1931, and on occasion concurrently served under Spaatz as executive officer of the 1st Bomb Wing at March Field.

McNarney was an instructor at the Army War College in Washington from August 1933 to March 1935, when he went to Langley Field, Virginia, as G-4, helping in the organization of the new General Headquarters Air Force with immediate promotion to lieutenant colonel. In July 1938, he was assigned to Hamilton Field, California, and in less than a year returned to Washington to serve in the War Plans Division of the War Department General Staff. McNarney became a member of the Joint Army-Navy Planning Committee in June 1939. The following March he was promoted to colonel. In May he was appointed to the Canada-United States Permanent Defense Board and became a brigadier general in April 1941. One month later, he was assigned as chief of staff of a special Army observer group in London, serving until December 1941.

=== World War II ===
After the attack on Pearl Harbor, McNarney served on the Roberts Commission which investigated the Army and Navy commanders in Hawaii. In January 1942, McNarney was promoted to major general and appointed by Army Chief of Staff Gen. George C. Marshall, to chair the War Department Reorganization Committee of the War Plans Division, resulting in the recommendation by Marshall of the plan that resulted in the autonomy of the United States Army Air Forces within the Army. He succeeded William Bryden as Marshall's deputy chief of staff in March with promotion to lieutenant general in June. While deputy chief of staff, McNarney developed a plan for land-based anti-submarine warfare under which the AAF organized the Army Air Forces Antisubmarine Command with a mission to attack hostile submarines "wherever they may be operating". This offensive measure materially aided destruction of the German hold on sea lanes before it was disbanded in 1943 as redundant to efforts of the United States Navy.

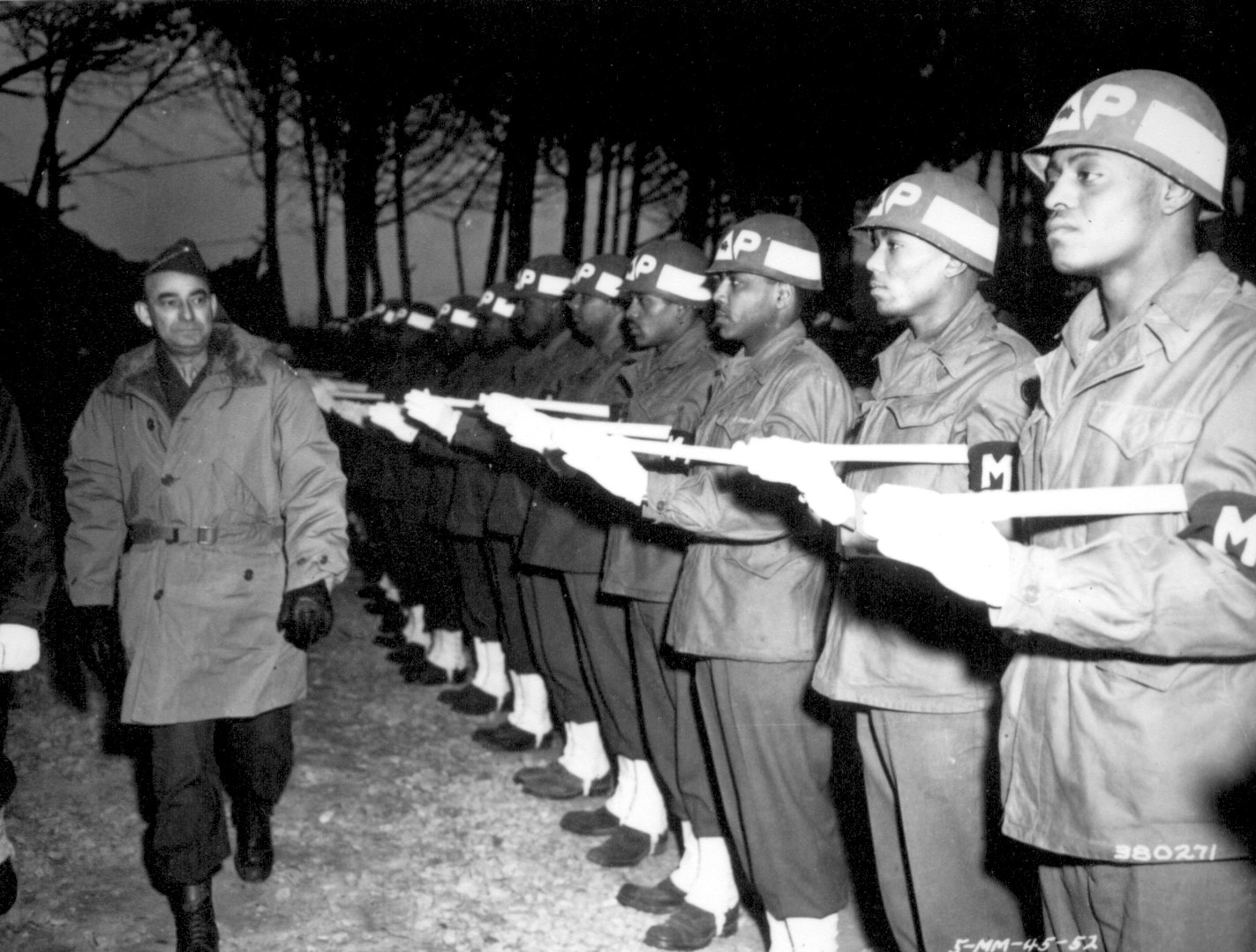
Lieutenant General Joseph T. McNarney, Deputy Supreme Allied Commander, Mediterranean Theater, inspects Honor Guard of MPs during his tour of the Fifth Army front at the 92nd Division sector, 4 January 1945

McNarney was high among the suggested officers who might serve as supreme commander of the Pacific War, but the position was not created. In October 1942, AAF Commanding General Henry H. Arnold proposed to Marshall that an Army man be named Supreme Allied Commander for the war effort in the Pacific and suggested Douglas MacArthur, McNarney or Lesley McNair for the position, Marshall without comment passed the request to his staff for analysis. There, Major General Albert Wedemeyer and Brigadier General St. Clair Streett examined the problem. Wedemeyer, an Army officer, thought the supreme commander should be an airman; either Arnold or McNarney. Streett, an airman himself, was also in favor of a supreme commander but he recognized the political challenges, projecting that the president would have to make the appointment, not a committee of military men. Streett suggested McNarney or Admiral Chester W. Nimitz, depending on whether an air or a naval strategy was considered most important. Of this analysis work, nothing was enacted; Marshall did not bring the problem and its suggested solutions to either the Navy or the president.

McNarney went to Europe as Deputy Supreme Allied Commander in the Mediterranean Theater and commanding general of the United States Army Forces, Mediterranean Theater, in October 1944. He was promoted to full general in March 1945, and in September became acting supreme allied commander of the Mediterranean Theater.

=== Post-war ===
After Dwight D. Eisenhower was appointed the Chief of Staff of the Army in Washington, D.C., McNarney took over his position as commanding general of the United States Forces in the European Theater and commander in chief, United States Forces of Occupation in Europe in November 1945. At the same time he was military governor of the American occupied zone in Germany in Frankfurt until the beginning of 1947. Thus, he was also the American representative in the Allied Control Council. Therefore, he was jointly responsible for the American food policy in occupied Germany in the harsh hunger-winter of 1946/47.

However, McNarney rarely displayed interest in his job; instead delegating most of his responsibility to his deputy governor, Lucius D. Clay. On 15 June 1946, Clay, frustrated with the difficulty of the job given his position, wrote to Secretary of State James Byrnes requesting his retirement. Secretary Byrnes pleaded for Clay to stay on, and Clay agreed. Shortly thereafter, McNarney was posted to a position in Washington, and Clay replaced McNarney as governor.

McNarney returned to the United States as senior member of the United Nations Military Staff Committee in New York City in March 1947. His first assignment as a general in the newly independent United States Air Force was as commander of Air Materiel Command at Wright-Patterson Air Force Base in Ohio in October 1947. He left Air Materiel Command to become chief of the Department of Defense's Management Committee in September 1949. McNarney retired on 31 January 1952, and held executive positions with General Dynamics, and later served on the Draper Committee. He died on 1 February 1972, in La Jolla, California. He is interred at Forest Lawn Memorial Park in Glendale, California.

== Racist beliefs ==
While serving as the military governor of the American zone from 1945 to 1947, McNarney refused to use any African-American service members as part of his staff and said that it would take 100 years before "the Negro will develop to the point where he will be on a parity with white Americans".

== Awards and decorations ==
McNarney's awards include:

- Army Distinguished Service Medal with four bronze oak leaf clusters
- Navy Distinguished Service Medal
- Legion of Merit
- Order of Suvorov First Class (Union of Soviet Socialist Republics)
- Knight Commander of the Order of the Bath (United Kingdom)
- Officer's Cross of the Order of White Eagle (Yugoslavia)
- Officer of the Order of Merit (Chile)
- Officer of the Military Legion of Merit (Brazil)
- War Medal (Brazil)
- Knight Grand Cross of the Order of Saints Maurice and Lazarus (Italy)
- Grand Officer of the Legion of Honour (France)
- Croix de Guerre with bronze Palm (France)
- Grand Cordon of the Order of Leopold with Palm (Belgium)
- Knight Grand Cross of the Order of the Crown (Belgium)
- Commander's Cross of the Virtuti Militari (Poland)
- Commander's Cross with Star of the Order of Polonia Restituta (Poland)

Military offices
Preceded by Dwight D. Eisenhower	Commanding General, United States Army Europe; 1945–1947	Succeeded by Lucius D. Clay
Preceded by George S. Patton (acting)	Military Governor of the U.S. Occupation Zone in Germany; 1945–1947	Succeeded by Lucius D. Clay
