= Saizerais Aerodrome =

- Part of American Expeditionary Forces (AEF)
- Located near: Saizerais, France
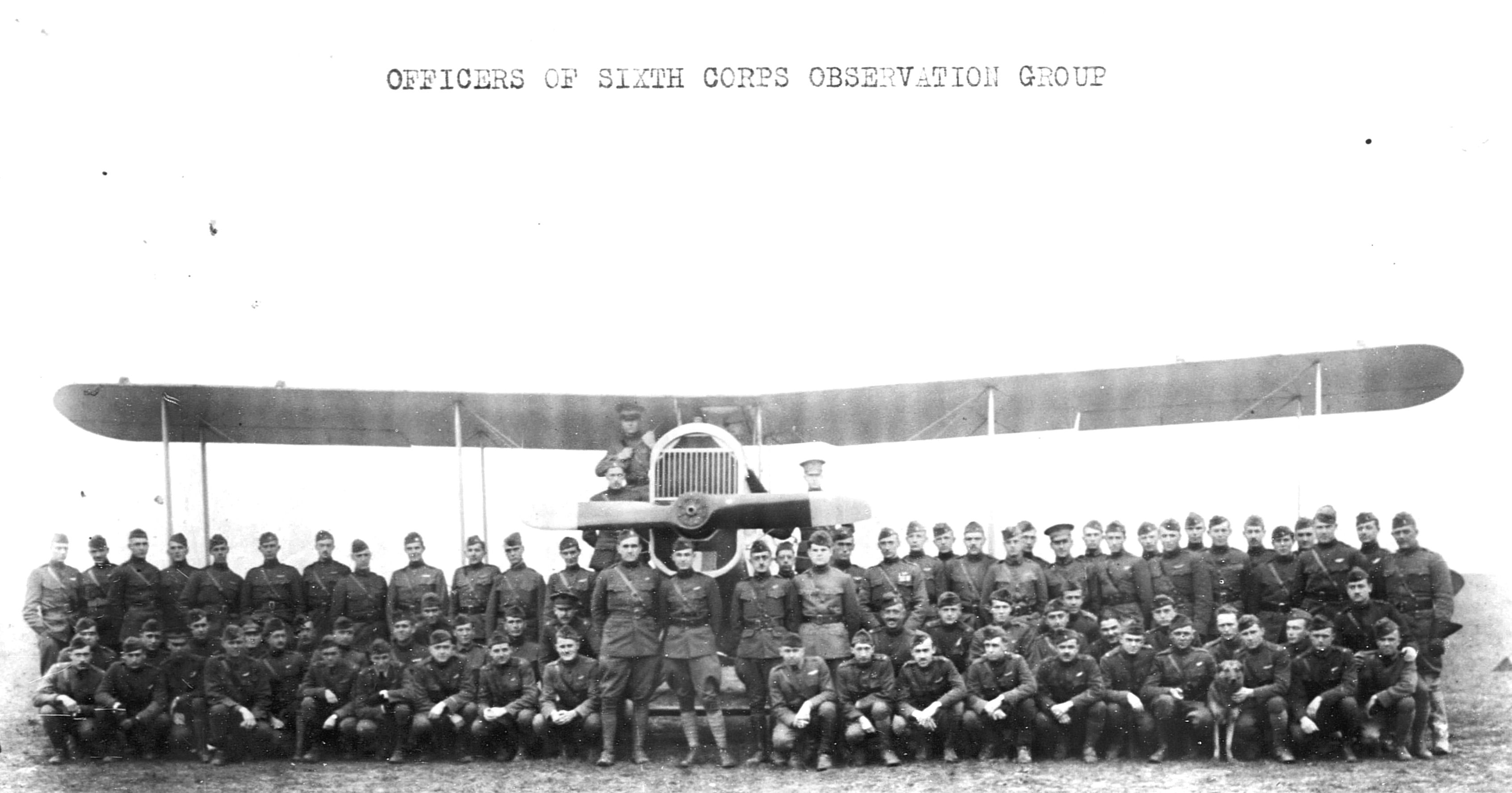
- VI Corps Observation Group officers with a De Havilland DH-4, Saizerais Airfield, France, November 1918

Site information
- Type: Combat Airfield
- Controlled by: Air Service, United States Army
- Condition: Agricultural area

Location
- Coordinates: 48°47′46″N 006°01′25″E

Site history
- Built: 1918
- In use: 1918–1919
- Battles/wars: World War I

Garrison information
- Garrison: VI Corps Observation Group; United States First Army Air Service

Saizerais Aerodrome, was a temporary World War I airfield in France, used by the French Air Service, and briefly by the Air Service, United States Army. It was located approximately 13 miles (21 km) north-northwest of Nancy in the Meurthe-et-Moselle department in north-eastern France.

== Overview ==
The airfield was built in late Spring 1916 by and for the French Air Service, and continuously operational until early April 1918.

484th Aero Squadron (Construct.) arrived about 10 October 1918, probably to make to tidy up an airfield which had not been used for some time. United States VI Corps Observation Group, Second Army Air Service two squadrons arrived on 23–25 October, with the Group's HQ; Second Army was established in October primarily to carry out offensive operations in the Metz area, however, before it could become fully operational, the war ended and the Group most likely did not perform many missions.

After the armistice, the Group's HQ stayed at Saizerais until being disbanded on 15 April 1919. The 354th Aero Squadron moved to Rhineland, while its second squadron, 8th Aero Squadron, had already left in late November 1918. The airfield was eventually returned to agricultural use; today it is a series of cultivated fields located 1/2 miles to the southwest of Saizerais, at the edge of Saizerais forest's northern tip.

== Known units assigned ==
- Headquarters, VI Corps Observation Group, 25 Oct – 15 April 1919
- 8th Aero Squadron (Observation), 23 October – 21 November 1918
- 354th Aero Squadron (Observation), 25 October – 15 April 1919

== See also ==
- List of Air Service American Expeditionary Force aerodromes in France
