= Fourth Corps Area =

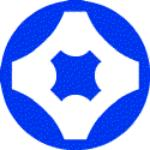
- Active: 20 August 1920–7 December 1941
- Country: United States of America
- Branch: United States Army
- Type: Military District
- Role: Training
- Part of: Department of War
- Garrison/HQ: Charleston, SC; Fort McPherson, GA; Atalanta, GA

The Fourth Corps Area was a Corps area of the United States Army from 20 August 1920 to 7 December 1941. It replaced the Southeastern Department based in Charleston, South Carolina and was originally headquartered there. The headquarters was then transferred to Atlanta, Georgia, and encompassed the states of Alabama (transferred in December 1920), Florida, Georgia, Louisiana, Mississippi, North Carolina, South Carolina and Tennessee.

Its formations included Third Army (1936–40); IV Corps with 4th Division, 30th Division, and 31st Division; XIV Corps with 81st Division, 82d Division, and 87th Division; Fourth Coast Artillery District; and Fourth Corps Area Service Command.

The Fourth Corps Area Training Center was established in 1921, originally at Camp McClellan, Alabama, to train regular army and organized reserve units, as well as ROTC cadets and CMTC candidates.

With the adoption of the four field army plan on 1 October 1933, the mobile units of the Fourth Corps Area were reassigned to the Third Army or GHQ Reserve, or were demobilized.

The Fourth Corps Area was redesignated as the Fourth Corps Area Service Command (CASC) in May 1941 and redesginated again as Fourth Service Command 22 July 1942.

== Commanders ==
Fourth Corps Area

- Major General George W. Read 20 August 1920–27 September 1920)
- Major General John F. Morrison (27 September 1920–25 October 1921)
- Brigadier General Walter H. Gordon (25 October 1921–13 July 1922)
- Major General David C. Shanks (13 July 1922–17 January 1925)
- Brigadier General Albert J. Bowley (17 January 1925–1 May 1925)
- Major General Douglas MacArthur (1 May 1925–26 July 1925)
- Brigadier General Albert J. Bowley (26 July 1925–7 October 1925)
- Major General Johnson Hagood (7 October 1925–19 March 1927)
- Brigadier General Albert J. Bowley 19 March 1927–4 April 1927
- Major General Malin Craig (4 April 1927–5 August 1927)
- Brigadier General Albert J. Bowley 5 August 1927–18 October 1927
- Major General Richmond P. Davis (18 October 1927–1 September 1929)
- Brigadier General Harold B. Fiske (1 September 1929–3 October 1929)
- Major General Frank R. McCoy 3 (October 1929–1 February 1932)
- Major General Edward L. King (5 February 1932–27 December 1933)
- Brigadier General James H. Reeves (28 December 1933–13 January 1934)
- Major General George V. H. Moseley (13 January 1934–28 September 1938)
- Brigadier General Robert O. Van Horn (28 September 1938–7 October 1938)
- Major General Stanley D. Embick (7 October 1938–30 September 1940)

Fourth Corps Area Service Command

- Major General John P. Smith (11 October 1940–25 February 1942)

Fourth Service Command

- Major General William Bryden (March 1942–15 January 1944)
- Major General Frederick E. Uhl (January 1944–10 June 45)
- Major General Edward H. Brooks (June 1945–December 1945)
