= Second Army Air Service =

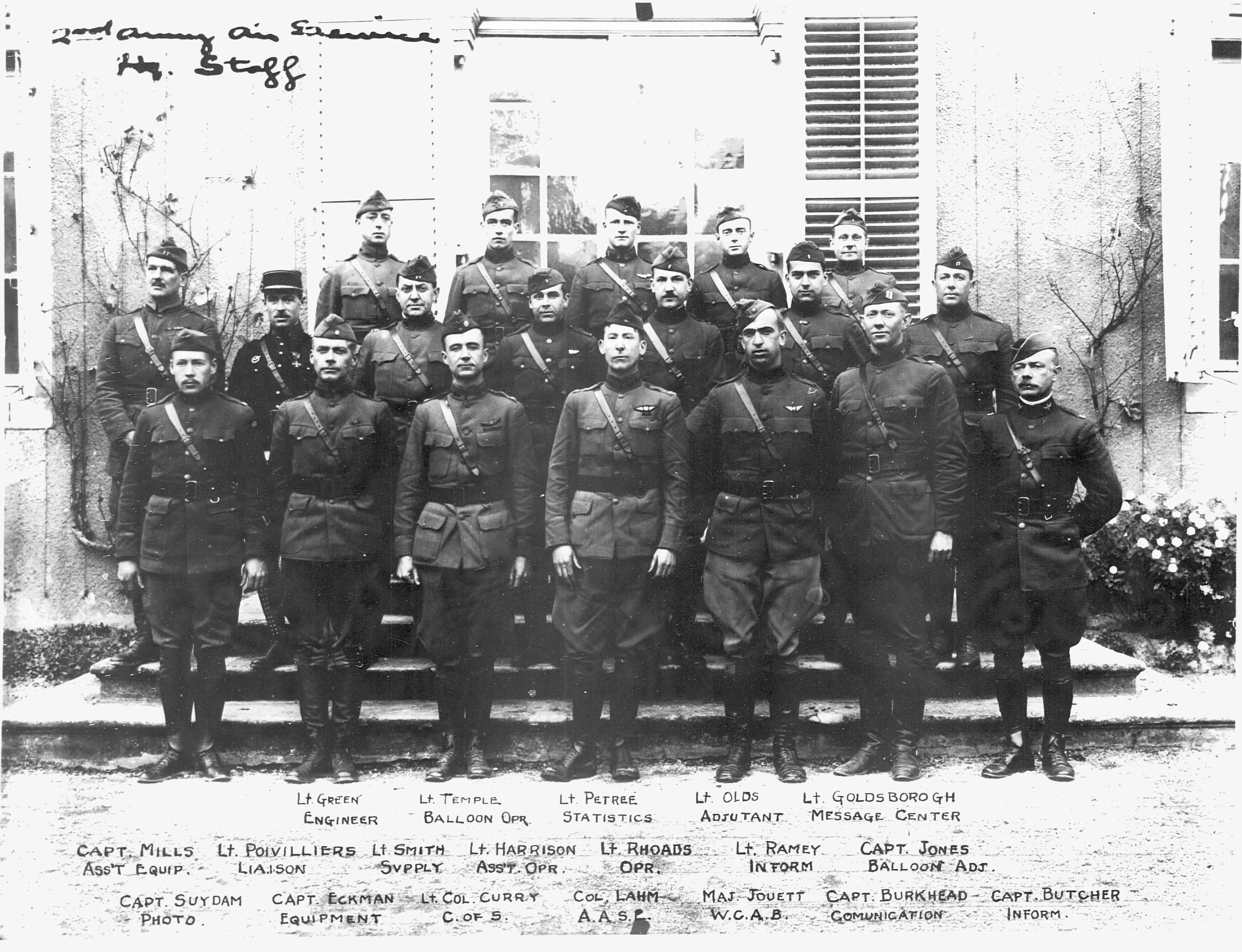
- Headquarters Staff, Second Army Air Service, Gengault Aerodrome (Toul), France, November 1918
- Active: 12 October 1918 – 15 April 1919
- Country: United States
- Branch: Air Service, United States Army
- Type: Air Service
- Role: Command and Control
- Part of: American Expeditionary Forces (AEF)
- Engagements: World War I

The Second Army Air Service was an Air Service, United States Army unit that fought on the Western Front during World War I as part of the Air Service, Second United States Army. It was demobilized in France on 15 April 1919 with the demobilization of the United States Second Army. There is no modern United States Air Force unit that shares its lineage and history.

== History ==
=== Organization ===
The Second Army Air Service was established on 14 October 1918 by General Order, 287, GHQ. Paragraph 170 appointed Colonel Frank P. Lahm as Chief of Air Service, Second Army, thus establishing a separate Air Service organization. Headquarters was established at Gengault Aerodrome, Toul, France.

Second Army was made up of the IV and VI Army Corps of the United States Army and the 2d Corps d'Armee Colonials (French). Since the French portion of the Army had undertaken to provide its own Air Service units, the Second Army AS was tasked to provide and assign the units necessary for the two American Army Corps along with pursuit and bombardment units for general operation with the Army. Plans were drawn up to have Corps Observation groups for the IV and VI Corps of three squadrons each; a Day Bombardment Group of 3 squadrons; a Pursuit Wing of three Groups, and an Army Observation Wing of 3 groups. In addition a balloon wing would be provided with balloon groups assigned to each Corps.

=== Formation ===
However, at the time of its establishment, nearly all of the Air Service units in France were already committed to the First Army Air Service, and the number of squadrons of the various types available were considerably less than needed. Also flying personnel with front-line experience were exceedingly scarce, in view of the demands being made by First Army, which was still in need of additional squadrons and personnel itself.

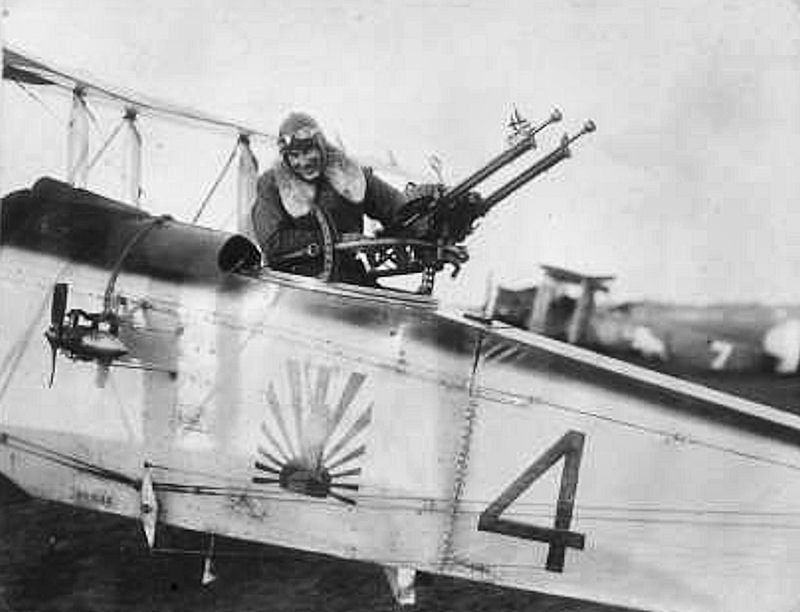
135th Aero Squadron Dayton-Wright DH-4 No 4

In order to give Second Army some experienced personnel, it was decided to withdraw the IV Corps Observation Group with the 8th and 135th Aero Squadrons from First Army and reassign them to Second Army. These two units were supplement from new squadrons being equipped at the Services of Supply 1st Air Depot at Colombey-les-Belles Airdrome.

The newly arrived 168th Aero Squadron was assigned to the Group at Toul, where the Group commenced operations at once with photographic and visual observation missions for Second Army. The 85th Aero Squadron was assigned on 4 November also to IV Corps. The VI Corps Observation Group was formed about the nucleus of the 8th Aero Squadron, which was joined by the 354th at Saizerais Aerodrome. The French Corps Observation Group was made up of the 28, 47th and 277th French Squadrons operating from the St. Mihiel Airdrome. This was the total Corps Observation organization on the date of the signing of the Armistice with Germany.

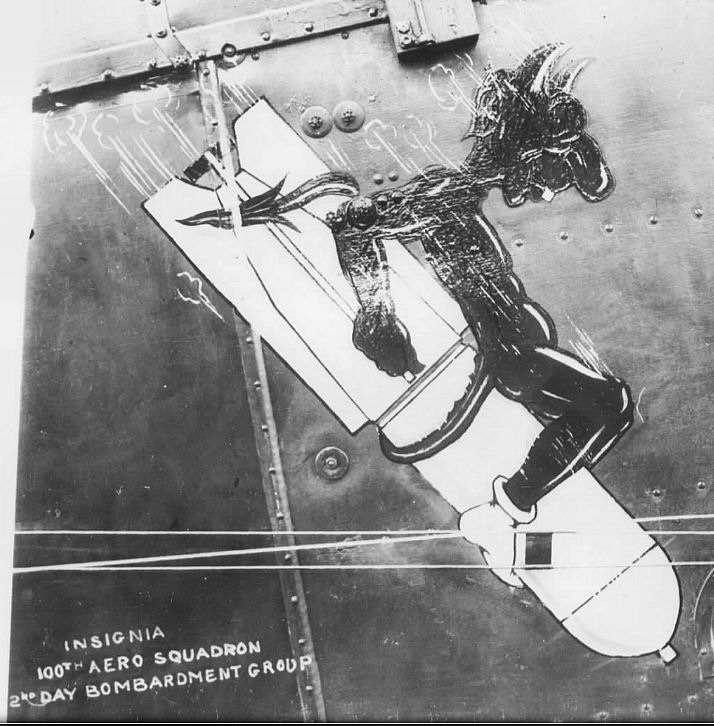
100th Aero Squadron Emblem, painted on the fuselage of DH-4 at Ourches Aerodrome

An Army Observation Group was tentatively formed at Toul on 25 October, however it never was fully organized with a command staff. The 85th Aero Squadron, assigned to the Group was transferred to IV Corps on 4 November. The 278th Aero Squadron, being equipped at Colombey, was not ready for assignment and, in fact, never arrived at the front by 11 November. Reconnaissance that required extensive penetration of the enemy lines, were carried out by the Corps Observation Groups.

The 2d Day Bombardment Group, consisting of the 100th and 163d Squadrons was assigned to Ourches Aerodrome, was unable to carry out any offensive operations prior to 11 November. Offensive Pursuit Patrols were only made by the 25th and 141st Squadrons, new squadrons transferred from Colombey which formed the nucleus of the 4th Pursuit Group. Had the war continued, this group would have performed in a stellar manner, as it was strengthened by the 17th and 148th Squadrons, two organizations which were transferred from operations with the British Expeditionary Forces on 4 November, and had been flying in combat for several months and were both highly commented upon by the Royal Air Force. Both were in the process of being re-equipped with SPAD XIII aircraft at the time of the Armistice. A second pursuit group, the 5th, had its units at Colombey at the time of the Armistice and was not organized until 15 November.

=== Demobilization ===
As a result of the Armistice with Germany, American occupation forces would be sent to the German Rhineland. The Third Army Air Service, under the command of Brigadier General William Mitchell was organized on 14 November as the Air Service component of Third Army. First and Second Army Air Services were ordered to transfer some of its units at the front to Third Army as part of its organization, along with personnel from their Headquarters staffs along with the required equipment, ranging from office furniture to airplanes. The 5th Pursuit Group was transferred to Third Army on 19 November, along with the 41st, 138th and 638th Aero Squadrons.

The rest of the Second Army Air Service remained at its stations in France, awaiting orders to demobilize. Flying continued on a limited basis to keep the pilots proficient in their skills. The 85th and 168th Squadrons were transferred to the Services of Supply 2d Air Instructional Center at Tours Aerodrome, where they carried out mapping missions directed by Headquarters, AEF.

On 15 April 1919, orders were received from Paris that the Second Army Air Service was to demobilize. The 85th, 141st, 168th, and 354th Aero Squadrons were transferred to Third Army, with the remainder of its organizations to report to the Services of Supply 1st Air Depot to turn in their equipment. After being processed at Colombey, personnel were assigned to the Commanding General, Services of Supply, and sent to one of several staging depots in France where they awaited transport back to the United States and subsequent return to civilian life.

=== Lineage ===
- Organized in France as: Second Army Air Service, on 14 October 1918

Demobilized in France on 15 April 1919

=== Assignments ===
- Second United States Army, 12 October 1918 – 15 April 1919

=== Components ===
- Second Army Observation Group, 25 October – 4 November 1918

Chaumont Aerodrome, France (Never Fully Organized)

- IV Corps Observation Group, 14 October 1918 – 28 February 1919

Gengault Aerodrome (Toul), France

- VI Corps Observation Group, 23 October 1918 – 15 April 1919

Saizerais Aerodrome, France

- French Corps Observation Group, 14 October – 11 November 1918

St. Mihiel Aerodrome (Attached)

- 2d Day Bombardment Group, 1 November 1918 – 15 April 1919

Ourches Aerodrome, France

- 4th Pursuit Group, 26 October 1918 – 15 April 1919

Gengault Aerodrome (Toul), France

- 5th Pursuit Group, 15 November 1918 – 15 April 1919

Lay-Saint-Remy Aerodrome, France

- 258th Aero Squadron, 7 November 1918 – 15 April 1919
- 278th Aero Squadron, 14 November 1918 – 15 April 1919

=== Stations ===
- Gengault Aerodrome (Toul), France, 12 October 1918 – 15 April 1919

== See also ==
- Organization of the Air Service of the American Expeditionary Force
