= Deputy Chief of Staff of the United States Army =

Defunct military position

The deputy chief of staff of the Army was a military position in the United States Army, operating from 1921 to 1948, that served as second-in-command to the chief of staff of the Army, the Army's most senior military officer. The deputy chief of staff of the Army was tasked with providing the chief of staff of the Army with policy review, budgetary direction, and administration of day-to-day operations, among other responsibilities. The office of the deputy chief of staff of the Army refers to both the office holder's position as well as their assigned staff.

In 1921, the deputy chief of staff of the Army replaced the executive assistant to the chief of staff of the Army. In turn, the deputy chief of staff was replaced by the vice chief of staff of the Army in 1948, which assumed responsibility for similar functions.

== Duties ==
The deputy chief of staff of the Army was second-in-command to the chief of staff of the Army. The deputy chief of staff was authorized to aid the chief of staff of the Army in providing high-level direction and guidance to the Army. The deputy chief of staff's specific responsibilities included reviewing existing policies and promulgating new ones. In addition, the deputy chief of staff also maintained responsibility for the oversight and approval of the Army's budgetary and legislative direction. The deputy chief of staff also determined guidance for the Army's organization and staffing, as well as administrative procedures for day-to-day operations.

The appointment of the deputy chief of staff was made by the United States secretary of war, based on the recommendation of the chief of staff of the Army. Generally, the deputy chief of staff was authorized to hold the rank of major general up until World War II, when the deputy became a lieutenant general, and later a full general.

== History ==
In September 1921, the deputy chief of staff of the Army was created to replace the executive assistant to the chief of staff of the Army.

In November 1948, the deputy chief of staff of the Army was replaced by the vice chief of staff of the Army.

== List of office holders ==
Individuals who served as deputy chief of staff of the Army included:

No.	Portrait	Deputy Chief of Staff of the United States Army	Took office	Left office	Time in office
1	James Harbord	Major General; James Harbord (1866–1947)	5 December 1921	31 December 1922	1 year, 26 days
2	John L. Hines	Major General; John L. Hines (1868–1968)	1 January 1923	31 December 1924	1 year, 365 days
3	Dennis E. Nolan	Major General; Dennis E. Nolan (1872–1956)	1 January 1925	31 December 1926	1 year, 351 days
4	Fox Conner	Major General; Fox Conner (1874–1951)	1 January 1927	30 November 1927	333 days
5	Briant H. Wells	Major General; Briant H. Wells (1871–1949)	1 December 1927	8 March 1930	2 years, 97 days
6	Preston Brown	Major General; Preston Brown (1872–1948)	9 March 1930	11 October 1930	215 days
7	Ewing E. Booth	Major General; Ewing E. Booth (1870–1949)	12 October 1930	21 December 1930	70 days
8	George Van Horn Moseley	Major General; George Van Horn Moseley (1874–1960)	22 December 1930	22 February 1933	2 years, 62 days
9	Hugh A. Drum	Major General; Hugh A. Drum (1879–1951)	23 February 1933	1 February 1935	1 year, 343 days
10	George S. Simonds	Major General; George S. Simonds (1874–1938)	2 February 1935	28 May 1936	1 year, 116 days
11	Stanley D. Embick	Major General; Stanley D. Embick (1877–1957)	29 May 1936	30 September 1938	2 years, 124 days
12	George C. Marshall	Brigadier General; George C. Marshall (1880–1959)	16 October 1938	30 June 1939	257 days
13	Lorenzo D. Gasser	Brigadier General; Lorenzo D. Gasser (1876–1955); Acting	1 July 1939	30 May 1940	334 days
14*	William Bryden	Major General; William Bryden (1880–1972); *Serving Simultaneously	1 June 1940	16 March 1942	1 year, 288 days
14*	Richard C. Moore	Major General; Richard C. Moore (Additional Deputy Chief of Staff) (1880–1966); *Serving Simultaneously	22 July 1940	8 March 1942	1 year, 229 days
14*	Henry H. Arnold	Lieutenant General; Henry H. Arnold (Acting Additional Deputy Chief of Staff for Air) (1886–1950); *Serving Simultaneously	11 November 1940	8 March 1942	1 year, 117 days
15	Joseph T. McNarney	Lieutenant General; Joseph T. McNarney (1893–1972)	9 March 1942	21 October 1944	2 years, 226 days
16	Thomas T. Handy	Lieutenant General – General; Thomas T. Handy (1892–1982)	22 October 1944	30 August 1947	2 years, 312 days
17	Joseph L. Collins	Lieutenant General; Joseph L. Collins (1896–1987)	1 September 1947	14 November 1948	1 year, 74 days

== See also ==
- Deputy chief of staff
- Vice Chief of Staff of the United States Army
