= 354th Aero Squadron =

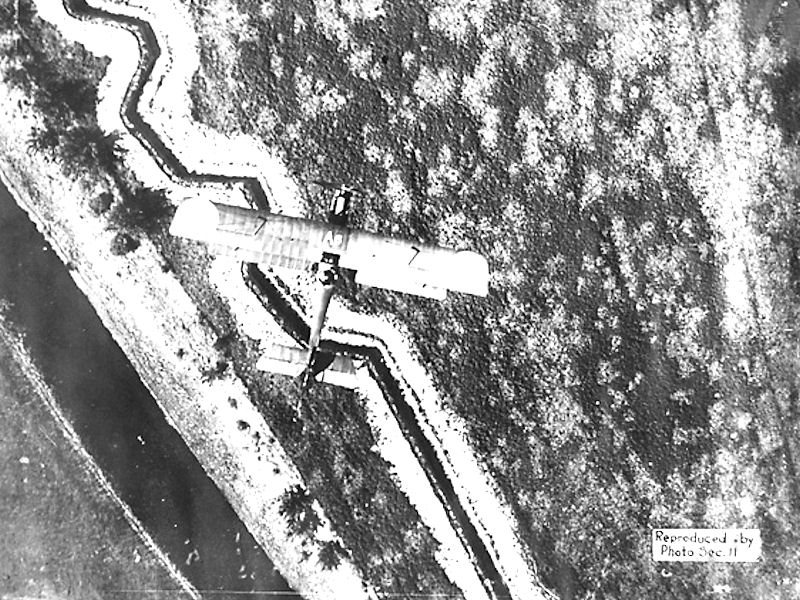
- A Dayton-Wright DH-4 of the 354th Aero Squadron flying over the front line trenches in the Toul Sector, France, November 1918
- Active: 29 January 1918 – 30 June 1919
- Country: United States
- Branch: United States Army Air Service
- Type: Squadron
- Role: Corps Observation
- Part of: American Expeditionary Forces (AEF)
- Engagements: World War I Occupation of the Rhineland

Commanders
- Notable commanders: Capt. Frederick J. Luhr

Insignia
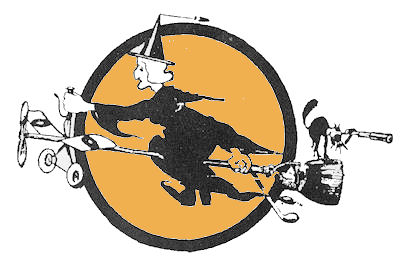
- 354th Aero Squadron Emblem

Aircraft flown
- Reconnaissance: Dayton-Wright DH-4, 1918–1919
- Trainer: Curtiss JN-4, 1918

Service record
- Operations: VI Corps Observation Group; Western Front, France: 21 October-11 November 1918: Combat operations began 28 October, ended morning of 11 November 1918. No casualties reported. Several encounters with enemy aircraft, but no combats reported.

The 354th Aero Squadron was a United States Army Air Service unit that fought on the Western Front during World War I.

The squadron was assigned as a Corps Observation Squadron, performing short-range, tactical reconnaissance over the VI Corps, United States Second Army sector of the Western Front in France, providing battlefield intelligence.

The squadron saw limited combat, and with Second Army's planned offensive drive on Metz cancelled due to the 1918 Armistice with Germany, and was assigned to the United States Third Army as part of the Occupation of the Rhineland in Germany. It returned to the United States in June 1919 and was demobilized.

The squadron was never reactivated and there is no current United States Air Force or Air National Guard successor unit.

== History ==
=== Origin ===
The 354th Aero Squadron was organized at Kelly Field, Texas, on 28 January 1918. The enlisted personnel, numbering one hundred and fifty in all, was composed of men of all walks of life. Hailing from almost every state in the Union, they had finally met at Kelly Field, Texas, for assignment. The majority had been at Kelly for as long as two months learning the squad movements, something about military courtesy and a lot about "fatigue". Many were still in civilian clothing that looked the worse for wear, and only a few were wearing a military uniform.

On 7 February due to measles cases, the 354th was placed in Quarantine Camp. Several of the men been sent to the Base Hospital at Fort Sam Houston, Texas, sick with measles and the congested quarters then occupied by the squadron made the spread of this and other diseases difficult to prevent. Naturally there was disappointment. It had been learned that the 354th was designated as a Service (Flying) Squadron and the anticipation of foreign service had grown very strong. In the Quarantine Camp there were the usual camp duties. Men had the opportunity to get acquainted and they began to feel more as members of an organization than as a lot of men temporarily brought together.

On 21 February the squadron was released from Quarantine Camp and ordered to Kelly Field No. 3, the part of Kelly that was used as an organization camp. Orders came on 21 March st for the squadron to move to Rich Field, Waco, Texas. At Waco there were the usual camp duties. The camp into which the organization went was constructed for the organization of Air Service units. Drills, fatigue and guard duty made up the daily schedule. Due to lingering sicknesses, the squadron was quarantined for the first ten days after reaching Rich Field. Remaining in Waco for about five weeks, the squadron continued its indoctrination into the Army, performing frequent hikes to various parts of the surrounding country, as well as learning flag semaphore signaling.

=== Training ===
On 27 April, the 354th was ordered to Hicks Field, part of the Camp Taliaferro training complex operated by the British Royal Flying Corps near Fort Worth, Texas. The squadron traveled to Hicks by rail. On 1 May one hundred five men were put on special duty in the hangars, the shops and the Quartermaster Department. Equipped with blue denim uniforms, the men set to work learning skills they would need in the war zone. The mechanics frequently went up in the Curtiss JN-4 training planes and on two or three occasions got involved in crashes. Unfortunately two squadron members were killed, and several were injured and had to be left behind at the end of training.

The squadron was ordered for overseas duty at the end of June, and on 9 July, the 354th received its travel orders to proceed immediately to the Aviation Concentration Center, Camp Mills, Long Island, New York for transfer. At this time, the 354th consisted of three officers and one hundred fifty-four men. The train arrived in Garden City early on 14 July. There the squadron awaited further orders, and on the 24th the order was received that no one could leave the camp. However, the squadron was delayed until 16 August when the squadron was moved to the Port of Entry, Hoboken, New Jersey, where it was boarded on the USS Von Steuben, a sized German liner that was impressed into service as a troop ship. The trans-Atlantic crossing to France was uneventful, the squadron arriving at the port of Brest, France on 25 August 1918.

=== Arrival in France ===
Upon arrival, the squadron remained at a rest camp, awaiting further orders. After five days, orders arrived sending the squadron to the Air Service Replacement Concentration Center at the large St. Maixent Replacement Barracks. A very uncomfortable French troop train was used to transport the squadron. The squadron arrived at St. Maixent at about 9.00 o'clock on the evening of 4 September. The distance up to the station from the railroad station was about two miles, and the squadron marched to the barracks, although some delays meant it was midnight until all were in their bunks.

The two weeks spent at St. Maixent were for the purpose of getting equipped to go into the fighting zone. Besides being issued extra clothing, rifles, gas masks, etc., the men were given special instructions in the use of their gas masks. However, while there, Spanish flu was prevalent and while there, about one-third of the 354th suffered from the disease. It was not until 19 September that the men had recovered enough to be transferred to the 1st Air Depot at Colombey-les-Belles Airdrome. There the distant booming of guns was convincing evidence that the "Zone of Advance" (Western Front) had been entered. For the next two weeks the men of the squadron were billeted on either side of the main road leading into the town from the front, where frequently the big guns came rumbling back for repairs and where trucks and ambulances were constantly going to and fro. At Colombey-les-Belles, the men got acquainted with the V-12 Liberty aircraft engine that would power the airplanes issued to the 354th, the Dayton-Wright DH-4. There, it was determined that the 354th would be a Corps Observation squadron, and on the 30th, the squadron was transferred to Autreville Airdrome.

Compared to the billets at Colombey, at Autreville there were newly constructed barracks and amongst other luxuries, there was a mess hall. Instead of a pig and a puddle at the entrance to the office, there was a nicely constructed cinder pathway with a rustic fence on either side. The majority of the men who had been left at St. Maixent, sick in the camp hospital, rejoined the squadron at Autreville. The 354th was the headquarters squadron and hence had the responsibility of keeping the post in good condition. Towards the middle of the month several pilots and observers joined the squadron and on the 21st seven DH-4s were ferried over from Colombey. The transportation equipment had already arrived and as everything was ready for a move to the front, the squadron left Autreville for the Saizerais Aerodrome at 10:30 A.M. on 25 October, traveling by trucks through Colombcy and Toul and arriving at 3 p.m. on the same day.

=== Toul Sector ===
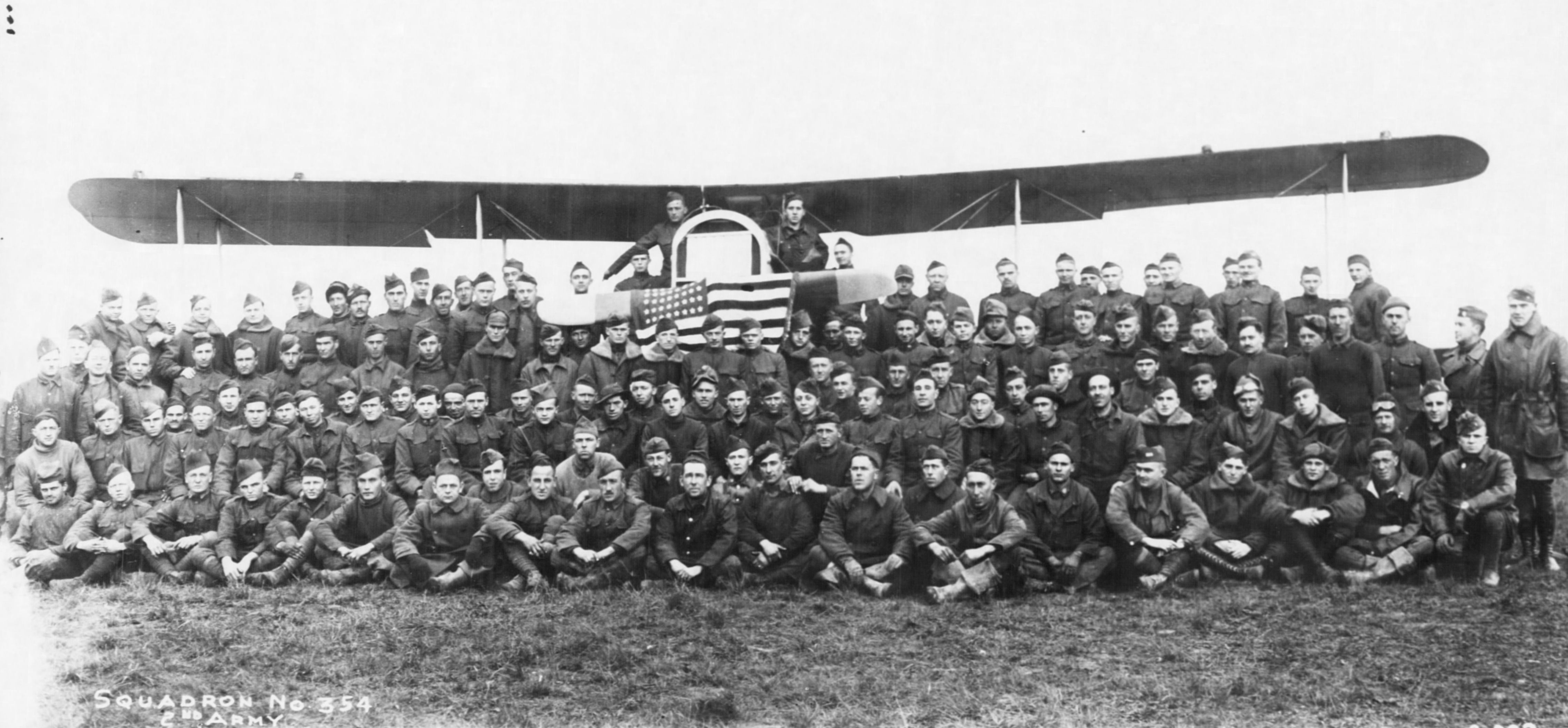
354th Aero Squadron, Saizerais Aerodrome, France

At Saizerais the 354th was joined with the 8th Aero Squadron to form the VI Corps Observation Group. No time was lost in getting to work. On the day following its arrival, several pilots and observers were transferred from the 8th, which had been on the Post for some time. Along with the pilots, seven DH-4s were also transferred from the 8th, which had more than was required.

On 28 October, with fourteen planes on hand and eleven pilots and fourteen observers assigned, the first operations were begun, consisting of reconnaissance in front of the 92d Infantry Division. The portion of the sector assigned to the 354th extended from Villier-sous-Perry to Eply. The squadron performed artillery adjustments for the 349th, 156th, 350th and 351st Field Artillery Regiments, also there were infantry liaison maneuvers with the 183d Brigade of the 92d Division. The number of planes, pilots and observers was increased and on 6 November, eighteen pilots were assigned, along with fifteen observers. The number of patrols scheduled to fly across the line varied from day to day, according to the movements of the enemy. An average of ten sorties were scheduled daily.

When the Armistice was signed on 11 November, the 354th had just struck its full stride. There were forty-seven officers, many of whom had considerable training. The enlisted personnel had been brought up to 184 men and the mechanics on the field were fully familiar with the DH-4s. During the time the squadron was in combat, no planes were lost and no casualties were suffered.

==== Third Army of occupation ====
Having arrived late at the front, the 354th remained in Europe for a considerable amount of time after the Armistice. After the Armistice, proficiency flights were flown and gunnery practice was taken, however, no flights were permitted over German-held territory. The squadron remained at Saizerais until 15 April 1919 when the Second Army Air Service was demobilized, and was ordered to join the occupation force of the Rhineland under the Third Army Air Service, IV Corps Observation Group.

One of its duties was to fly over Cologne and other parts of the Rhineland occupied by Third Army. In addition, the squadron was able to perform test flights on surrendered German aircraft. Flights of the Fokker D.VII, Pfalz D.XII, Halberstadts and Rumpler aircraft were made and evaluations were made.

==== Demobilization ====
On 13 June 1919 orders were received from First Army for the squadron to report to the 1st Air Depot, Colombey-les-Belles Airdrome to turn in all of its supplies and equipment and was relieved from duty with the AEF. The squadron's DH-4 aircraft were delivered to the Air Service Production Center No. 2. at Romorantin Aerodrome, and there, practically all of the pilots and observers were detached from the squadron.

Personnel at Colombey were subsequently assigned to the commanding general, services of supply, and ordered to report to a staging camp at Le Mans, France, for the return crossing of the Atlantic back to the United States. It then moved to the port of embarkation at Brest, where the squadron left France by ship on 11 June and docked in New York City on 25 June 1919. There, the men of the 354th Aero Squadron were demobilized and returned to civilian life.

=== Lineage ===
- Organized as: 354th Aero Squadron on 28 January 1918

Re-designated: 354th Aero Squadron (Corps Observation), on 30 September 1918
Demobilized on 30 July 1919.

=== Assignments ===
- Post Headquarters, Kelly Field, 28 January 1918
- Post Headquarters, Fort Sam Houston, 7 February 1918
- Post Headquarters, Kelly Field, 21 February 1918
- Post Headquarters, Rich Field, 21 March 1918
- Aviation Section, U.S. Signal Corps

Attached to: Royal Flying Corps, 1 May-9 July 1918

- Aviation Concentration Center, 14 July 1918
- Headquarters, Chief of Air Service, AEF, 25 August 1918
- Air Service Replacement Concentration Center, 4 September 1918
- 1st Air Depot, 19 September 1918
- VI Corps Observation Group, 25 October 1918
- IV Corps Observation Group, 15 April 1919
- 1st Air Depot, 13 June 1919
- Commanding General, Services of Supply, June 1919
- Mitchel Field, New York, 25–30 June 1919

=== Stations ===
- Kelly Field, Texas, 28 January 1918
- Fort Sam Houston, Texas, 7 February 1918
- Kelly Field, Texas, 21 February 1918
- Rich Field, Texas, 21 March 1918
- Hicks Field, Texas, 1 May 1918
- Aviation Concentration Center, Garden City, New York, 14 July 1918
- Port of Entry, Hoboken, New Jersey

Overseas transport: USS Von Steuben, 16–25 August 1918

- Brest, France, 25 August 1918
- St. Maixent Replacement Barracks, France, 4 September 1918
- Colombey-les-Belles Airdrome, France, 19 September 1918
- Autreville Aerodrome, France, 30 September 1918
- Saizerais Aerodrome, France, 25 October 1918s
- Sinzig Airdrome, Germany, 15 April 1919
- Colombey-les-Belles Airdrome, France, 13 June 1919
- Le Mans, France, June 1919
- Brest, France, June 1919
- Mitchel Field, New York, July 1919

=== Enemy aircraft flown for evaluation ===
- Evaluated Fokker D.VII, Pfalz D.XII, Halberstadt and Rumpler aircraft, 1919

=== Combat sectors and campaigns ===
Streamer	Sector/Campaign	Dates	Notes
	Toul Sector	28 October – 11 November 1918	

=== Notable personnel ===
- Cpt. Frederick Luhr, SSC

SSC: Silver Star Citation

== See also ==
- Organization of the Air Service of the American Expeditionary Force
- List of American aero squadrons
