= Lykens, Ohio =

Coordinates: 40°57′54″N 83°01′01″W

Lykens is an unincorporated community in Lykens Township, Crawford County, Ohio, United States.

== History ==
Lykens was laid out in 1870.

== Notable people ==
- Lorenzo D. Gasser, U.S. Army major general, born in Lykens
