= Lorenzo D. Gasser =

U.S. Army major general

- Gasser as a colonel, circa 1930. Harris & Ewing Collection, Library of Congress.
- Born: May 3, 1876; Lykens, Ohio, U.S.
- Died: October 29, 1955 (aged 79); Washington, D.C., U.S.
- Burial place: Arlington National Cemetery
- Spouse: Molly Gregory Sugrue (m. 1904–1951)
- Military career
- Allegiance: United States
- Service: Ohio National Guard; United States Army
- Service years: 1893–1898 (National Guard); 1899–1940 (Army); 1941–1945 (Army)
- Rank: Major General
- Nickname: Cap
- Service number: O–1018
- Unit: U.S. Army Infantry Branch
- Commands: Company E, 2nd Ohio Volunteer Infantry; Company A, 43rd Infantry Regiment; Company I, 28th Infantry; 31st Infantry Regiment; Post of Manila; 16th Infantry Brigade; Fort Meade, Maryland; War Department Manpower Board
- Wars: Spanish–American War; Philippine–American War; United States Military Government in Cuba; Pancho Villa Expedition; World War I Japanese invasion of Manchuria; World War II
- Awards: Army Distinguished Service Medal (3); Legion of Merit; Legion of Honor (Chevalier) (France)

Lorenzo Dow Gasser (May 3, 1876 – October 29, 1955) was a career officer in the United States Army. A veteran of the Spanish–American War, Philippine–American War, United States Military Government in Cuba, Pancho Villa Expedition, World War I, and World War II, he attained the rank of major general and was a recipient of three awards of the Army Distinguished Service Medal, the Legion of Merit, and the French Legion of Honor (Chevalier). Gasser was best known for his command of the 31st Infantry Regiment as part of the 1932 U.S. response to the Japanese invasion of Manchuria, his service as Deputy Chief of Staff of the United States Army (following George C. Marshall), and his Second World War presidency of the War Department Manpower Board.

A native of Lykens, Ohio, Gasser was raised and educated in Tiffin, Ohio, where he worked as a glassworker and store clerk and served in the Ohio National Guard. He enlisted as a private in 1893, was promoted to sergeant, and received his commission as a captain in 1898. Gasser commanded Company E, 2nd Ohio Volunteer Infantry during the Spanish–American War, then served as a first lieutenant with the 43rd U.S. Volunteer Infantry Regiment in the Philippines during the Philippine–American War. He then obtained a commission in the regular army, and served primarily with the 28th Infantry at Fort Snelling, Minnesota. From 1906 to 1909, he served with the 28th Infantry as part of the United States Military Government in Cuba. In early 1916, he took part in the Pancho Villa Expedition on the staff of the army's Southern Department headquarters in El Paso, Texas. During World War I, he served as assistant chief of staff of the 30th Division, assistant chief of staff of III Corps, and assistant chief of staff for transportation (G-4) at the American Expeditionary Forces headquarters. After the war, he served as deputy assistant chief of staff (G-4) in charge of disposing of enemy war materiel during the post-war occupation. Gasser's wartime service was recognized with award of the Army Distinguished Service Medal and French Legion of Honor (Chevalier).

After the war, Gasser served on the War Department General Staff, as executive officer of the 10th Infantry Regiment, and on the staff of the army's Chief of Infantry. In 1931 he was assigned to command the 31st Infantry Regiment and the Post of Manila. In 1932, his regiment took part in the U.S. response to the Japanese invasion of Manchuria. In June 1936, Gasser was promoted to brigadier general and in September he was assigned to command the 16th Infantry Brigade. From July 1939 to May 1940, Gasser served as Deputy Chief of Staff of the United States Army, and he retired after reaching the mandatory retirement age of 64. His service as Deputy Chief of Staff was recognized with a second award of the Army Distinguished Service Medal.

In 1941, Gasser was recalled to active duty for World War II and served as the War Department representative at the Office of Civilian Defense. In 1942, he was assigned as OCD's assistant director in charge of civilian protection and promoted to major general. In March 1943, he was appointed president of the War Department Manpower Board, and he served in this position until retiring again in December 1945. His wartime service was recognized with a third award of the Army Distinguished Service Medal and award of the Legion of Merit. In retirement, Gasser resided in Washington, D.C.. He died in Washington on October 29, 1955, and was buried at Arlington National Cemetery.

== Early life ==
Gasser was born in Lykens, Ohio, on May 3, 1876, a son of Frederick Gasser and Lucinda (Rhoads) Gasser. His father, a Union Army veteran of the American Civil War, died in 1882, and Gasser and his siblings were raised by guardians in Tiffin, Ohio. Gasser attended the public schools of Tiffin and was employed as a glassworker and a clerk in a grocery store. In July 1893, Gasser enlisted in the Ohio Army National Guard's Company E, 2nd Infantry Regiment, and he advanced through the ranks to become a sergeant. In April 1898 he became company commander with the rank of captain.

== Start of career ==
At the start of the Spanish–American War, most of Gasser's National Guard company volunteered for federal service, and they were organized as Company E, 2nd Ohio Volunteer Infantry. He led his company during mobilization and training at Camp Asa S. Bushnell near Columbus, Ohio, Camp George H. Thomas near Chattanooga, Tennessee, and Camp John S. Poland near Knoxville, Tennessee. The war ended in December 1898, and Gasser's company was discharged at Camp Sylvester B. Price near Macon, Georgia, in February 1899.

Gasser returned to Tiffin, but in August 1899 he resumed active military service when he was commissioned as a first lieutenant in the 43rd Infantry Regiment, a temporary unit raised for the Philippine–American War. Before he departed Tiffin, the mayor and other civic leaders presented Gasser with a ceremonial sword and uniform rank insignia, hat and gloves at a well-attended October 5 public gathering. He joined his regiment at Fort Ethan Allen, Vermont, then served in the Philippines as commander of the 43rd Infantry's Company A. He was promoted to captain in April 1901, and discharged in July 1901.

After his discharge from the volunteers, Gasser was appointed a second lieutenant in the regular army with an effective date of February 1901, and assigned to the 21st Infantry Regiment. He was promoted to first lieutenant in January 1902, and served with his regiment in the Philippines from January 1902 to January 1904.

Following his return from the Philippines, Gasser commanded Company I, 28th Infantry at Fort Snelling, Minnesota, after which he remained at Fort Snelling as a member of the regimental staff. In September 1904, Gasser married Molly Gregory Sugrue of Tiffin. Because they had carried out their courtship in secret, Sugrue left Tiffin after telling friends and family that she was going to visit the Louisiana Purchase Exposition in St. Louis. They were first notified of the wedding by Sugrue's telegram informing them that she had traveled to San Francisco, where Gasser and she were married at the home of Archbishop Patrick William Riordan. They had no children and remained married until her death in 1951.

From 1906 to 1909, Gasser served with the 28th Infantry as part of the United States Military Government in Cuba. He was promoted to captain in July 1911, and in September 1911 he was transferred to the 10th Infantry Regiment at Fort Benjamin Harrison, Indiana. In November, he rejoined the 28th Infantry at Fort Snelling.

== Continued career ==
In February 1913, Gasser was assigned to temporary Quartermaster duty with U.S. forces in Galveston, Texas. In early 1916, he took part in the Pancho Villa Expedition when he was assigned to temporary staff duty with the army's Southern Department in El Paso, Texas. At the start of World War I in 1917, Gasser was assigned to duty with the Army General Staff in Washington, D.C. In October 1917, he was assigned as assistant chief of staff for the 30th Division during its organization and training at Camp Sevier, South Carolina. In January, Gasser returned to the War Department staff and was assigned as recorder of the Department of War's War Council, a body of senior officials responsible for directing planning and policy during the war.

In March 1918, he was promoted to temporary major and temporary lieutenant colonel, both to date from August 5, 1917. In June 1918, he arrived in France, where he served as assistant chief of staff for III Corps, then attended the General Staff College course in Langres. In September, he was assigned as assistant chief of staff for transportation (G-4) at the American Expeditionary Forces headquarters. Gasser remained in Europe after the end of the war in November 1918, and served as deputy assistant chief of staff (G-4) in charge of disposing of enemy war materiel during the post-war occupation. He returned to the United States in February 1919, and his wartime service was recognized with award of the Army Distinguished Service Medal. and French Legion of Honor (Chevalier).

After returning to the United States, Gasser served on the War Department General Staff until July 1920, when he was assigned as a student at the Army War College. After graduating in June 1921, he was assigned as secretary of the War Department General Staff. In 1925, he was assigned to the 10th Infantry at Fort Thomas, Kentucky. In 1927, he was assigned to staff duty in the office of the Chief of Infantry. He was promoted to colonel in May 1928.

== Later career ==
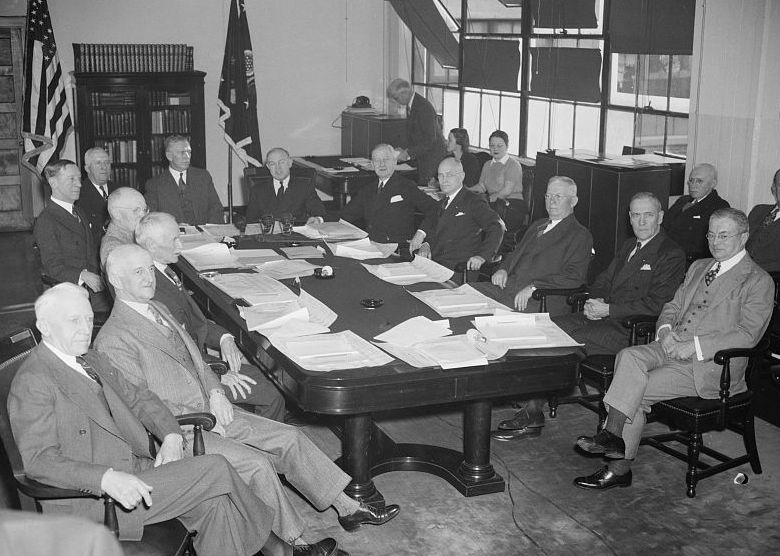
Army and Corps area Commanders meet with Secretary of War and Chief of Staff in Washington, D.C., Dec. 1, 1939. Gasser is first on the left. Army Chief of Staff George Marshall is seated at the head of the table.

In June 1931, Gasser was assigned to command the 31st Infantry Regiment and the Post of Manila in the Philippines. In February 1932, Gasser led the 31st Infantry to China, where it took part in the protection of U.S. government and business interests during the American response to the Japanese invasion of Manchuria. In July, the 31st Infantry resumed duty in Manila. In February 1934, Gasser returned to the United States and was assigned as chief of staff of the Fourth Corps Area at Fort McPherson, Georgia.

Gasser was promoted to brigadier general in June 1936 and in September he was assigned to command the 16th Infantry Brigade, a unit of the 8th Infantry Division, at Fort Meade, Maryland. In August 1937, he was assigned as the army's assistant chief of staff for personnel (G-1). In July 1939, George C. Marshall, the Deputy Chief of Staff of the United States Army, was promoted to Chief of Staff of the United States Army. When Marshall requested that Gasser serve as his deputy, Gasser protested that he was too old and would retire in less than a year. Marshall countered that Gasser's experience and institutional knowledge would be invaluable to Marshall as Marshall began his new duties, so Gasser consented. Because his retirement was imminent, Gasser was ineligible for promotion to major general, so he served as Marshall's acting deputy until May 1940, when he reached the mandatory retirement age of 64 and was succeeded by William Bryden. At his retirement, he received a second award of the Army Distinguished Service Medal, which was presented by Secretary of War Harry Woodring.

In retirement, Gasser advocated military preparedness in speeches to civilian and military audiences and volunteered to inspect camps and review troops as the army expanded in anticipation of entry into World War II. In May 1941, Gasser was recalled to active duty and assigned as the War Department representative at the Office of Civilian Defense, a wartime agency created to coordinate federal activities including nighttime blackouts and air raid warnings intended to protect civilians and wartime industries in the event of an invasion or emergency.

In early 1942, Gasser was promoted to major general and assigned as OCD’s assistant director in charge of civilian protection. In July 1942, Gasser was one of the members of the military commission that tried and convicted the participants of Operation Pastorius. Pastorius was a German effort to land covert operatives in the United States for the purpose of sabotaging the American war effort. The eight agents were apprehended almost immediately after they arrived in June, and six of them were executed in August. In February 1943, theater commander Dwight Eisenhower requested that Marshall assign a general officer to serve as Eisenhower's personal representative at the front during the Tunisian campaign. Gasser was among those Eisenhower suggested, but when Marshall replied that Omar Bradley, another officer on Eisenhower's list, who had served under Gasser when Gasser was the Army's G-1, was immediately available, Eisenhower concurred.

In March 1943, the army created the War Department Manpower Board, a five-member panel headed by Gasser that reviewed civilian and military staffing requirements at army facilities throughout the United States to identify areas where the War Department could implement economies and efficiencies as it attempted to balance the army’s need for uniformed soldiers with the need for civilian employees in wartime industries. In May 1943, Gasser received the honorary degree of Doctor of Military Science (DScMil) from Pennsylvania Military College. In late 1944 and early 1945, Gasser traveled to Europe to conduct manpower reviews of U.S. Army bases, and he returned to the U.S. in March. In September 1945, Gasser received the Legion of Merit to recognize his work with the Office of Civilian Defense and a third award of the Army Distinguished Service Medal to commend his service with the manpower board, both of which were presented by Marshall. He retired for the second time in December 1945.

== Death and burial ==
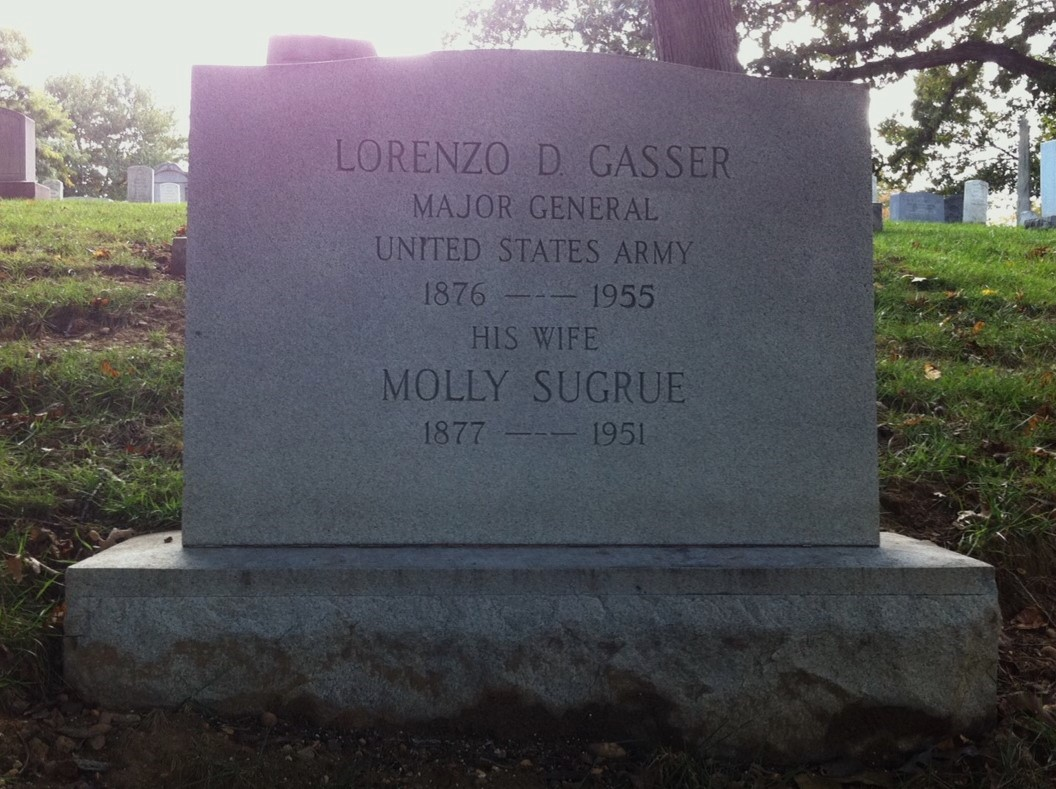
Grave of Gasser at Arlington National Cemetery

In retirement, Gasser was a resident of the Kennedy–Warren Apartment Building in Washington, D.C. An avid golfer, Gasser belonged to the Army and Navy Club, Chevy Chase Club and Burning Tree Club, and he frequently played with Eisenhower and other senior army leaders. In August 1948, he donated his papers and collection of military memorabilia to the Seneca County Museum in Tiffin. In October 1946, 1948, and 1952 Gasser was one of the speakers at reunions of the company he commanded during the Spanish–American War.

Gasser died at Walter Reed Army Medical Center in Washington on October 29, 1955. He was buried at Arlington National Cemetery.

== Works by ==
- "Division Supply". Infantry Journal. Washington, DC: United States Infantry Association. July–August 1913. pp. 21–24 – via Google Books.
- Gasser, L. D. (May 1942). "The Civilian Element in the National Fighting Team". The Military Engineer. 34 (199). Alexandria, VA: Society of American Military Engineers: 221–222. JSTOR 44691771.

== Dates of rank ==
Gasser's effective dates of rank were:

- Captain (Ohio National Guard), April 22, 1898
- Captain (United States Volunteers), May 13, 1898
- First Lieutenant, (United States Volunteers), August 17, 1899
- Second Lieutenant, February 2, 1901
- First Lieutenant, January 4, 1902
- Captain, March 11, 1911
- Major (temporary), August 5, 1917
- Lieutenant Colonel (temporary), August 5, 1917 (vacated May 16, 1919)
- Major, February 9, 1918
- Lieutenant Colonel, July 1, 1920
- Colonel, May 10, 1928
- Brigadier General, June 17, 1936
- Brigadier General (retired), May 4, 1940
- Brigadier General, May 24, 1941
- Major General (temporary), January 19, 1942
- Major General (retired), December 31, 1945

== Awards ==
Gasser's awards and decorations included:

- Distinguished Service Medal with two Oak Leaf Clusters
- Legion of Merit
- Spanish War Service Medal
- Philippine Campaign Medal
- Cuban Pacification Medal
- Mexican Service Medal
- World War I Victory Medal
- American Defense Service Medal
- American Campaign Medal
- World War II Victory Medal
- Legion of Honor (France)

=== Distinguished Service Medal citations ===
The citations for Gasser's awards of the Distinguished Service Medal included:

- "The President of the United States of America, authorized by Act of Congress, July 9, 1918, takes pleasure in presenting the Army Distinguished Service Medal to Major (Infantry) Lorenzo Dow Gasser (ASN: 0-1018), United States Army, for exceptionally meritorious and distinguished services to the Government of the United States, in a duty of great responsibility during World War I. As Chief of Motor Transportation Section, Office of the Assistant Chief of Staff, G-4, American Expeditionary Forces, Major Gasser showed unusual ability, tireless energy, and a comprehensive grasp of details in preparing plans for the organization and operation of a general headquarters reserve of motor transportation. Later, As Deputy Assistant Chief of Staff, G-4, at Advance General Headquarters at Treves, Germany, in coordinating the plans for the reception and disposition of enemy war materials, he successfully handled a problem requiring great tack and high professional attainments, thereby rendering services of great value to the American Expeditionary Forces."

Service: Army Rank: Major Division: American Expeditionary Forces General Orders: War Department, General Orders No. 43 (1922)

- "The President of the United States of America, authorized by Act of Congress, July 9, 1918, takes pleasure in presenting a Bronze Oak Leaf Cluster in lieu of a Second Award of the Army Distinguished Service Medal to Brigadier General Lorenzo Dow Gasser (ASN: 0-1018), United States Army, for exceptionally meritorious and distinguished service in a position of great responsibility to the Government of the United States, during a grave emergency. By his leadership and executive ability while Acting Deputy Chief of Staff of the Army of the United States (1939 - 1940), Brigadier General Gasser has made an important contribution to the National Defense. Denied by force of circumstances the increased rank appropriate to his high position, the vigor and efficiency with which he has carried out the exacting cuties of his office afford a fine example of the highest soldier qualities."

Service: Army Rank: Brigadier General Division: War Department General Staff General Orders: American Decorations, Supplement 4 (1940)

- "The President of the United States of America, authorized by Act of Congress, July 9, 1918, takes pleasure in presenting a Bronze Oak Leaf Cluster in lieu of a Third Award of the Army Distinguished Service Medal to Major General Lorenzo Dow Gasser (ASN: 0-1018), United States Army for exceptionally meritorious and distinguished service in a position of great responsibility to the Government of the United States. As president of the War Department Manpower Board from March, 1943 to September, 1945 he initiated measures which ensured the most effective and economical use of manpower, both military and civilian, under jurisdiction of the War Department."

Service: Army Rank: Major General Division: War Department General Staff General Orders: War Department, General Orders No. 80 (1945)
