= Thomas T. Handy =

United States Army general

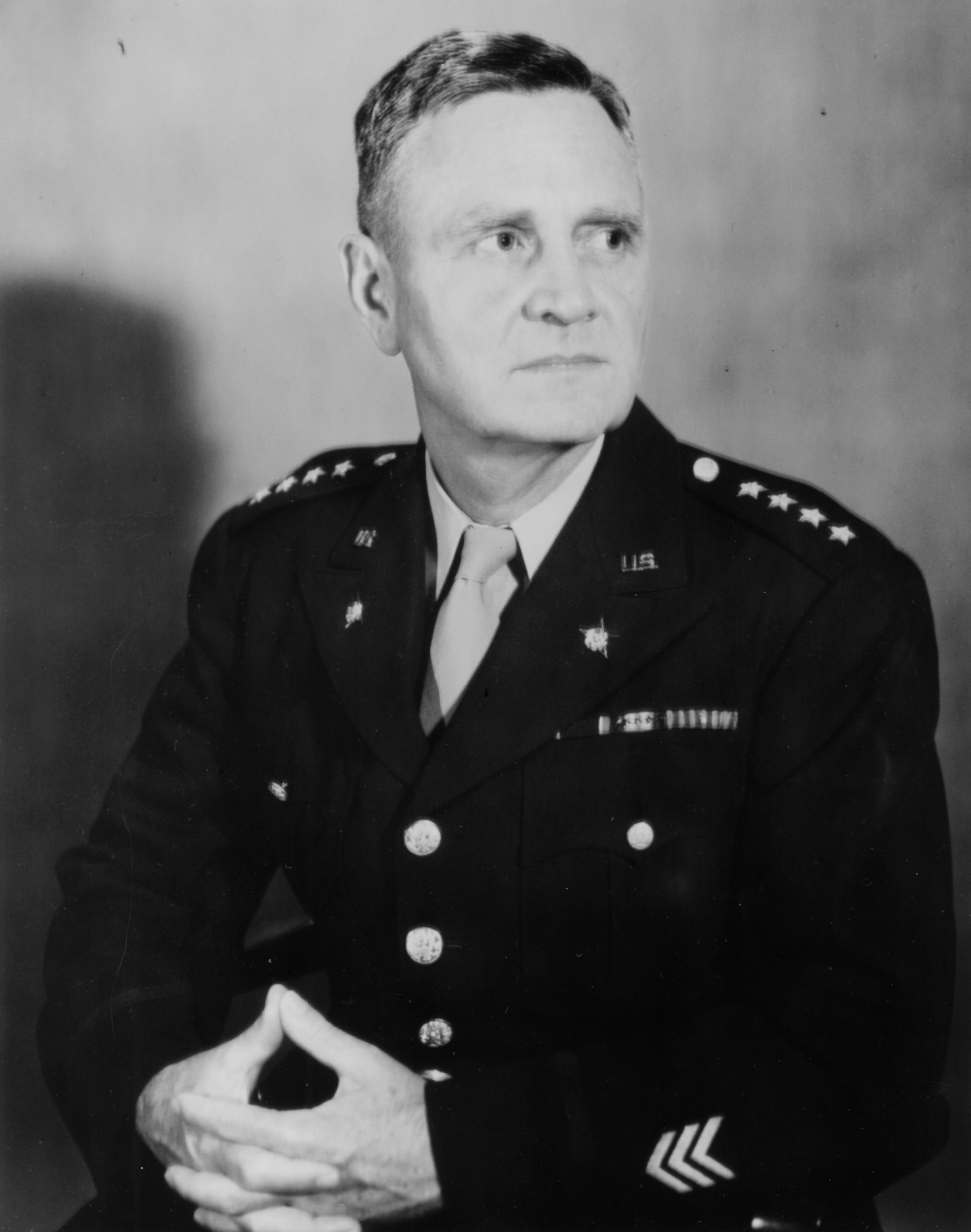
- Handy in 1952
- Born: 11 March 1892; Spring City, Tennessee
- Died: 12 April 1982 (aged 90); San Antonio, Texas
- Burial place: Arlington National Cemetery
- Military career
- Allegiance: United States
- Branch: United States Army
- Service years: 1916–1954
- Rank: General
- Service number: 0-4665
- Commands: United States Army Europe; Deputy Chief of Staff of the United States Army; United States European Command; Fourth United States Army; 78th Field Artillery Battalion
- Conflicts: World War I World War II
- Awards: Distinguished Service Cross; Army Distinguished Service Medal (3); Legion of Merit

Thomas Troy Handy (11 March 1892 – 12 April 1982) was a United States Army four-star general who served as Deputy Chief of Staff, United States Army from 1944 to 1947; Commanding General, Fourth United States Army from 1947 to 1949; Commander in Chief, United States European Command from 1949 to 1952; Commander in Chief, United States Army Europe/Commander, Central Army Group in 1952; and Deputy Commander in Chief, United States European Command from 1952 to 1954.

== Biography ==
Handy was born on 11 March 1892, in Spring City, Tennessee, and attended the Virginia Military Institute, graduating in 1914. He did not receive an army commission until two years later, in the Field Artillery. Handy deployed with the 5th Field Artillery Regiment to France in August 1917, four months after the American entry into World War I, moving to the 42nd Division in 1918. On 26 February 1918, he accompanied Colonel Douglas MacArthur, the 42nd Division's chief of staff, on a trench raid. Later that year was assigned to the 151st Field Artillery Regiment. Following World War I and occupation duty in Germany he went to Fort Sill, Oklahoma. During the war, he was awarded the Distinguished Service Cross (United States).

The President of the United States of America, authorized by Act of Congress, 9 July 1918, takes pleasure in presenting the Distinguished Service Cross to Major (Field Artillery) Thomas Troy Handy, United States Army, for extraordinary heroism in action while serving with 7th Field Artillery, 1st Division, A.E.F., in the Salient-du-Feys, France, 9 March 1918. When Company D, 168th Infantry was under severe attack in the salient du Feys, France, Major Handy voluntarily joined it upon finding that he could do so without interfering with his normal duties, and by his coolness and conspicuous courage aided materially in its success.(https://valor.militarytimes.com/hero/100173)

Handy returned to his alma mater in 1921, serving as an instructor until 1925. After graduating from the Command and General Staff School at Fort Leavenworth, Kansas, he assumed duties as Executive Officer of the 3rd Field Artillery Brigade in 1928. He served in various staff assignments from 1929 to 1931 in Panama, then returned to Fort Sill as an instructor at the United States Army Field Artillery School until 1934. His time there was followed as a student at the United States Army War College, and after graduating in 1935 he went to the Naval War College. His schooling was followed by assignment to the General Staff until 1940, interrupted for a year by taking command of the 78th Field Artillery Battalion at Fort Benning.

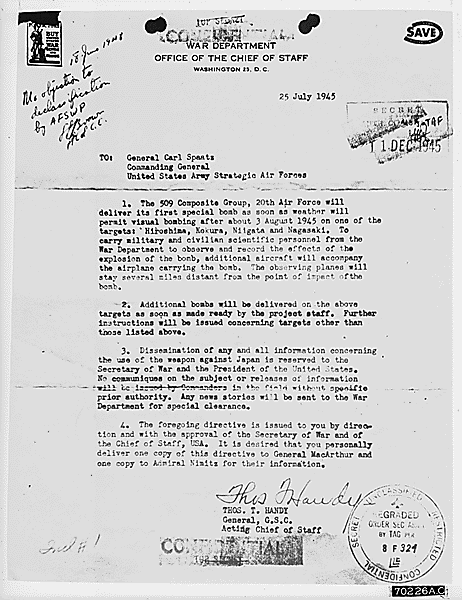
Letter from Handy to General Carl Spaatz authorizing the dropping of the first atomic bomb, 25 July 1945

In December 1941 Handy was promoted to temporary brigadier general, and temporary major general in June 1942 when he became Assistant Chief-of-Staff in charge of Operations Division, succeeding Dwight Eisenhower. In September 1944 he was promoted to temporary lieutenant general. In October 1944 he became Deputy Chief-of-Staff of the Army, receiving his fourth star in March 1945. In August 1945 he was acting Chief-of-Staff, due to George C. Marshall's absence, and transmitted the order for use of the atomic bomb.

Following the war, Handy remained Deputy Chief of Staff, and in September 1947 he assumed command of Fourth United States Army at Fort Sam Houston, Texas. Two years later, in September 1949, he was Lucius D. Clay's successor as Commander-in-Chief of European Command (EUCOM). He moved to Deputy Supreme Allied Commander in 1952 when Matthew Ridgway was named Supreme Allied Commander Europe. Handy retired from the army in 1954 to Washington, D.C., later residing in San Antonio, Texas.

Handy died on 12 April 1982 at the Brooke Army Medical Center in San Antonio, and was buried in Arlington National Cemetery next to his wife, Alma Hudson Handy (1890–1970).

== Awards and decorations ==
Handy's awards and decorations included the Distinguished Service Cross, Army Distinguished Service Medal with two oak leaf clusters, Legion of Merit, National Defense Service Medal, Croix de Guerre (France), the Commander of the Legion of Honor (France), the Croix de Guerre with Palm (Belgium), Honorary Knight Commander of the Order of the British Empire (United Kingdom), Grand Officer of the Order of Leopold (Belgium), Grand Cordon of the Order of Cloud and Banner (Yun Hui) (China), the Order of Abdon Calderon 1st Class (Ecuador), and the Distinguished Civilian Service Medal.

Military offices
| Preceded by Clarence R. Huebner | Commanding General United States Army Europe; 1949–1952 | Succeeded by Manton S. Eddy |
