= William Bryden =

United States Army major general

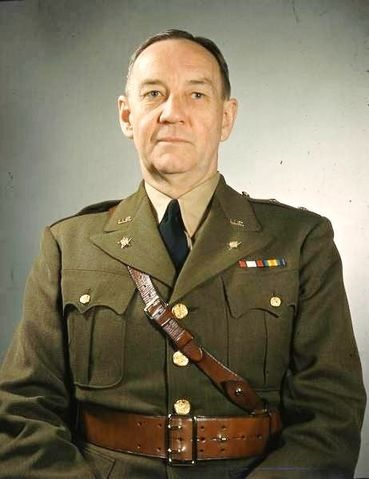
- Bryden circa 1941, when he was the army's Deputy Chief of Staff
- Born: February 3, 1880; Hartford, Connecticut, U.S.
- Died: January 20, 1972 (aged 91); Washington, D.C., U.S.
- Burial place: Arlington National Cemetery
- Spouse: Ellen Barry (m. 1912–1972, his death)
- Children: 2
- Relatives: Raymond W. Bliss (cousin); Thomas Henry Barry (father-in-law)
- Military career
- Allegiance: United States
- Service: United States Army
- Service years: 1904–1946
- Rank: Major General
- Service number: 0–1900
- Unit: U.S. Army Field Artillery Branch
- Commands: Department of Field Gunnery, School of Fire for Field Artillery; 329th Field Artillery Regiment; 15th Field Artillery Brigade; 9th Field Artillery Brigade; 16th Infantry Brigade and Fort George G. Meade; 13th Field Artillery Brigade and Fort Bragg; Fourth Corps Area; Fourth Service Command; Secretary of War´s Separation Board
- Conflicts: Philippine–American War; Pancho Villa Expedition; World War I World War II
- Awards: Army Distinguished Service Medal (3)

William Bryden (February 3, 1880 – January 20, 1972) was a career officer in the United States Army. A veteran of the Philippine–American War, Pancho Villa Expedition, World War I, and World War II, he attained the rank of major general and was three-time recipient of the Army Distinguished Service Medal. Bryden was best known for his assignment to several senior command positions, including the 15th Field Artillery Brigade (1918), 9th Field Artillery Brigade (1918–1919), 16th Infantry Brigade and Fort George G. Meade (1937–1938), 13th Field Artillery Brigade and Fort Bragg (1938–1940), Deputy Chief of Staff of the United States Army (1940–1942), Fourth Corps Area (1942), Fourth Service Command (1942–1944), and president of the Secretary of War´s Separation Board (1944–1946).

A native of Hartford, Connecticut, Bryden was raised in Hartford and Chelsea, Massachusetts. He graduated from the United States Military Academy (West Point) in 1904 and began a career in the Field Artillery Branch. His early assignments included Fort D. A. Russell, Wyoming and Fort Stotsenburg, Philippines. He was an instructor in mathematics at West Point from 1908 to 1912, and secretary of the Field Artillery School from May 1915 to June 1916. During World War I, Bryden served as assistant commandant of the School of Fire for Field Artillery and director of the school's Department of Field Gunnery, and received promotion to temporary colonel and temporary brigadier general in October 1918. In the closing days of the war, he commanded the 15th Field Artillery Brigade at Camp Stanley, Texas and the 9th Field Artillery Brigade at Camp McClellan, Alabama from November 1918 until the brigade was demobilized in February 1919.

Bryden's post-war assignments included instructor at the United States Army Command and General Staff College and executive officer in the Office of the Chief of Field Artillery. He commanded the 16th Infantry Brigade at Fort George G. Meade, Maryland from September 1937 to May 1938 and the 13th Field Artillery Brigade and Fort Bragg from May 1938 to June 1940. Bryden was the Deputy Chief of Staff of the United States Army from June 1940 to March 1942, and was promoted to major general in May 1941. He commanded the Fourth Corps Area (later redesignated the Fourth Service Command) from March 1942 until February 1944, when he reached the mandatory retirement age of 64. Because of the army's expansion for World War II, Bryden remained on active duty and served as president of the Secretary of War´s Separation Board. He retired for the second time in January 1946.

In retirement, Bryden resided in Washington, D.C. He died in Washington on January 20, 1972, and was buried at Arlington National Cemetery.

== Early life ==
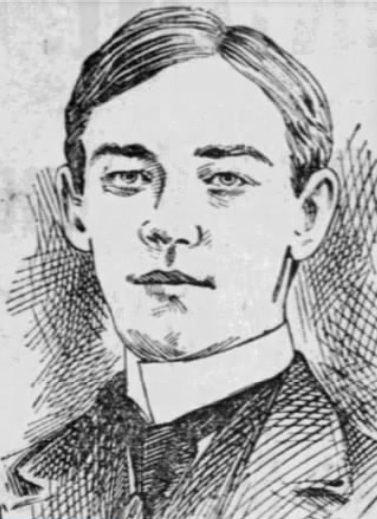
Bryden at the time of his 1900 appointment to West Point

Bryden was born in Hartford, Connecticut on February 3, 1880, a son of veterinarian George Bryden and Florence A. (Bliss) Bryden. He was raised and educated in Hartford until his father died in 1895, after which he was raised in the Chelsea, Massachusetts home of his maternal uncle, Eli C. W. Bliss. Bryden's first cousin, Raymond W. Bliss, served as Surgeon General of the United States Army from 1947 to 1951.

Bryden attended Chelsea High School, from which he graduated in 1898. During his high school years, Chelsea High School fielded a battalion of cadet companies that performed in military drill and ceremony contests. Bryden was elected commander of Company C, known as "Pony Company" because its members were smaller than average or otherwise deemed unsuitable for the top tier companies. Bryden was already decided upon a military career, and his leadership abilities were evident when he led Company C to first place in 1898's annual competition.

In 1899, Bryden competed for a congressional appointment from Representative John F. Fitzgerald to the United States Military Academy (West Point). He placed second on the examination and was named as alternate in the event the first-place finisher did not accept or was disqualified. In early 1900, he competed for a congressional appointment from Senator George Frisbie Hoar; he finished first on the exam, received the appointment, and began attendance at West Point in the fall of 1900. Bryden graduated in 1904 ranked 19th of 124 and received his commission as a second lieutenant of Field Artillery.

== Start of career ==
Bryden was assigned to the 13th Field Artillery Battery at Fort D. A. Russell, Wyoming, where he served from September 1904 to January 1906. He was then posted to Fort Stotsenburg, Philippines with his battery during the Philippine–American War, where he served from March 1906 to June 1907. Bryden was promoted to first lieutenant in January 1907, and in May 1907 the 13th Battery was redesignated Battery E, 5th Field Artillery Regiment. He served with Battery E in the Philippines until April 1908, and at Fort Leavenworth, Kansas until August 1908. While at Fort Stotsenberg, Bryden assisted Edmund L. Gruber in creating the "U.S. Field Artillery March".

From August 1908 to August 1912, Bryden was a mathematics instructor at West Point. He served with the 5th Artillery at Fort Sill, Oklahoma from November 1912 to December 1914 and Fort Naco, Arizona from December 1914 to January 1915, during the Pancho Villa Expedition. In January 1915, he received promotion to captain. Bryden was a student at the Fort Sill School of Fire for Field Artillery from February to May 1915, and served as secretary of the Field Artillery School from May 1915 to June 1916.

== Continued career ==
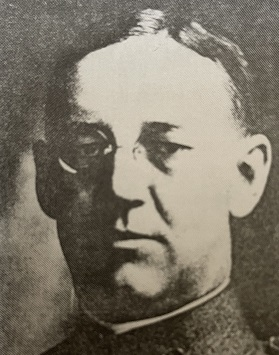
National Archives photo, circa 1918

From June 1916 to June 1917, Bryden served as aide-de-camp to Thomas Henry Barry, commander of the Central Department with headquarters in Chicago. He was a member of the Central Department staff from June to August 1917, and was promoted to temporary major and lieutenant colonel on August 5 as the army expanded for World War I. From August to October 1917, he commanded the 329th Field Artillery Regiment at Camp Custer, Michigan. From October 1917 to October 1918, Bryden served as assistant commandant of the School of Fire for Field Artillery and director of the school's Department of Field Gunnery. He was promoted to temporary colonel in June 1918 and temporary brigadier general in October 1918.

Bryden commanded the 15th Field Artillery Brigade at Camp Stanley, Texas from October to November 1918 and the 9th Field Artillery Brigade at Camp McClellan, Alabama from November 1918 until the brigade was demobilized in February 1919, following the end of the war. In February 1919, he reverted from temporary brigadier general to his permanent rank of major. He served at Fort Sill from February to May 1919, then traveled to Treves (now Trier) in Germany, where he attended the course at the Army Center of Artillery Studies from June to July. After returning to the United States in August, Bryden was assigned to the War Department General Staff in Washington, D.C. Bryden's accomplishments at the Field Artillery School during the war were recognized in 1921 with award of the Army Distinguished Service Medal.

In September 1922, Bryden began attendance at the United States Army Command and General Staff College, from which he graduated in June 1923. He remained at the staff college as an instructor from June 1923 to May 1924, when he was assigned to command 2nd Battalion, 1st Field Artillery Regiment at Fort Sill. In July 1924, he returned to the Command and General Staff College as an instructor, where he remained until August 1927. Bryden was a student at the United States Army War College from August 1927 to June 1928, and he was promoted to lieutenant colonel in March 1928. After completing the war college course, Bryden was assigned as executive officer in the Office of the Chief of Field Artillery.

In October 1931, Bryden was assigned to temporary duty with the Second Corps Area at Governors Island, New York. From December 1931 to October 1934 he served concurrently as executive officer of the 13th Field Artillery Regiment and 11th Field Artillery Brigade at Schofield Barracks, Hawaii. From December 1934 to August 1935, Bryden served with the 6th Field Artillery Regiment at Fort Hoyle, Maryland, and he was promoted to colonel in May 1935.

== Later career ==
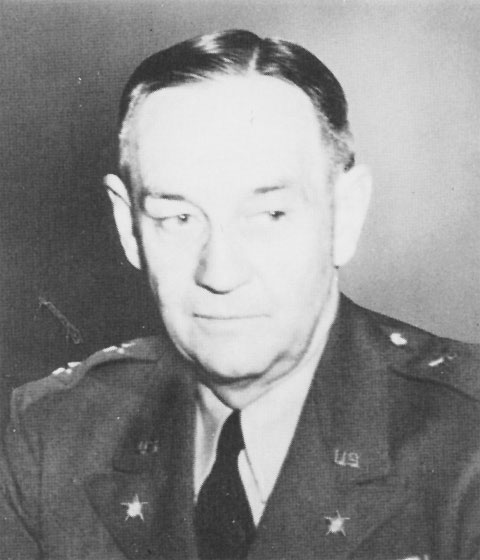
From 1950's The United States Army in World War II – The War Department: Chief of Staff; Prewar Plans and Preparations

Bryden served in the Operations section (G-3) Mobilization Division on the War Department General Staff from August 1935 to September 1937, and he was promoted to brigadier general on September 1, 1937. From September 1937 to May 1938 he commanded the 16th Infantry Brigade at Fort George G. Meade, Maryland. In May 1938, he was assigned to command the 13th Field Artillery Brigade and the post at Fort Bragg, North Carolina.

In June 1940, Bryden was assigned as Deputy Chief of Staff of the United States Army, succeeding Lorenzo D. Gasser. In May 1941, he received promotion to major general. After Joseph T. McNarney succeeded him as deputy chief of staff in March 1942, Bryden commanded the Fourth Corps Area, later redesignated the Fourth Service Command until reaching the mandatory retirement age of 64 in February 1944. Bryden remained on active duty as part of the U.S. effort for World War II as president of the Secretary of War's Separation Board, which made recommendations on which officers to retain in the army after the war. He retired again in January 1946. Bryden's World War II achievements were recognized with two awards of the Army Distinguished Service Medal, one for his term as deputy chief of staff and one for his leadership of the Fourth Service Command and presidency of the separation board.

== Death and burial ==
In retirement, Bryden was a resident of Washington, D.C. and Niantic, Connecticut. He was active in veterans and academic affairs, including membership in the Newcomen Society of the United States and Army and Navy Club, service as commander of Washington's American Legion Post 18, and appointment as senior vice commander of the D.C. chapter of the Military Order of the World Wars. Bryden maintained a longtime interest in West Point alumni affairs, including a term as one of the alumni association's vice presidents. He died in Washington on January 20, 1972. Bryden was buried at Arlington National Cemetery.

== Awards ==
Bryden received three awards of the Army Distinguished Service Medal; one to recognize his World War I service, one to recognize his performance of duty as Deputy Chief of Staff of the United States Army, and one to recognize his leadership of the Fourth Service Command and presidency of the Secretary of War's Separation Board. His other awards included the Philippine Campaign Medal, Mexican Border Service Medal, World War I Victory Medal, World War II Victory Medal, American Campaign Medal, and American Defense Service Medal.

== Family ==
In 1912, Bryden married Ellen Barry (1885–1974), the daughter of Major General Thomas Henry Barry. They were the parents of two daughters. Daughter Ellen (1914–1995) was the wife of Lieutenant General Alexander D. Surles (1916–1995). Daughter Marion (1917–2004) was the wife of first Melvin W. Schoephoester (1911–1942), a pilot who died while serving as a first lieutenant in World War II, then Major General Frank Willoughby Moorman (1912–1995).

== Works by ==
- "The Field Artillery of the "Army of the United States"". The Field Artillery Journal. Washington, DC: United States Field Artillery Association. May–June 1921. pp. 247–272 – via Google Books.
