= Stanley Dunbar Embick =

United States Army general

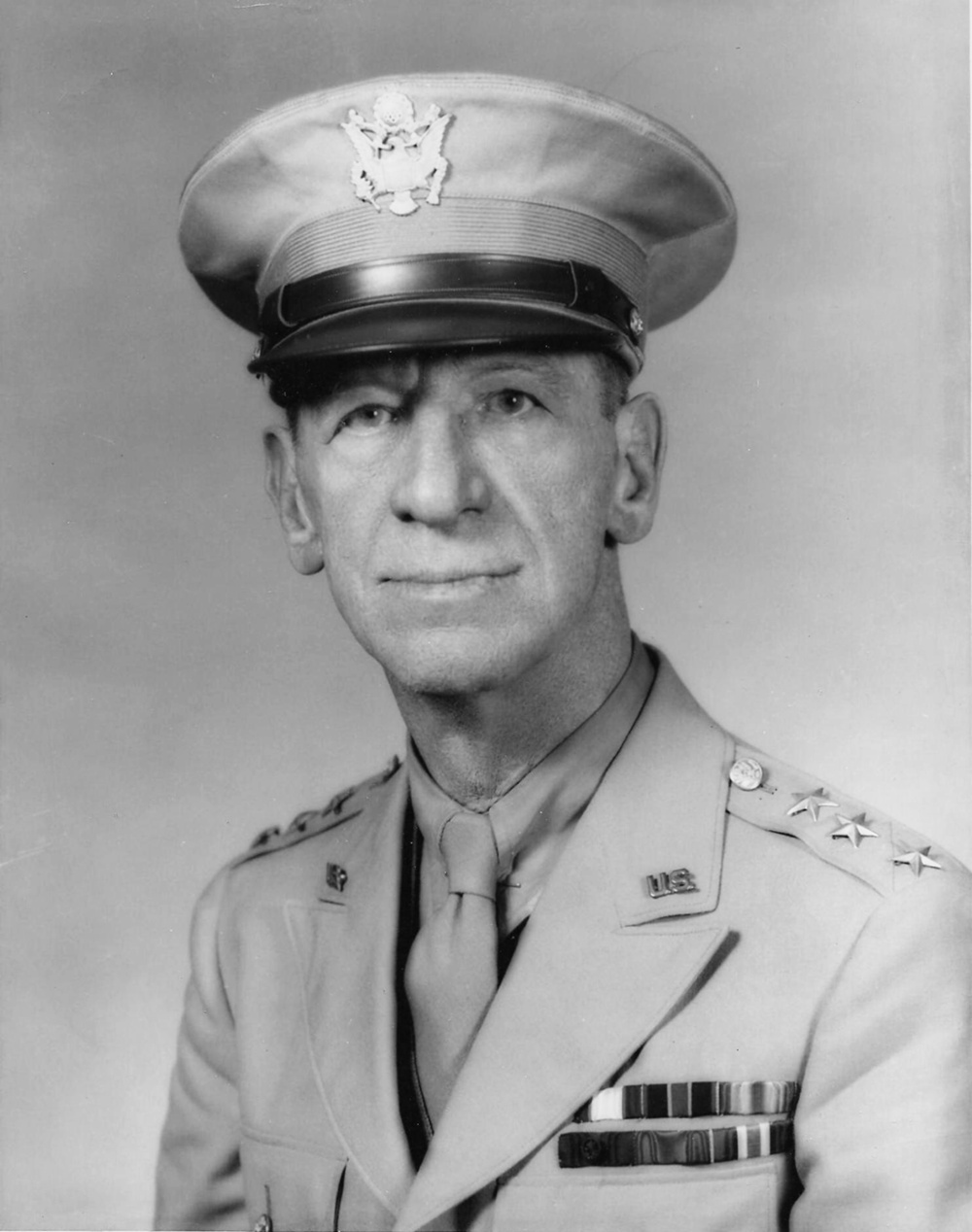
- Born: January 22, 1877; Greencastle, Pennsylvania, U.S.
- Died: October 23, 1957 (aged 80); Walter Reed Army Medical Center, U.S.
- Burial place: Arlington National Cemetery
- Military career
- Allegiance: United States
- Branch: United States Army
- Service years: 1899–1941; 1942–1946
- Rank: Lieutenant General
- Service number: 0-766
- Commands: Third United States Army; IV Corps; Deputy Chief of Staff of the United States Army
- Conflicts: Spanish–American War; World War I World War II
- Awards: Army Distinguished Service Medal (2)

Stanley Dunbar Embick (January 22, 1877 – October 23, 1957) was a lieutenant general in the United States Army.

== Military career ==
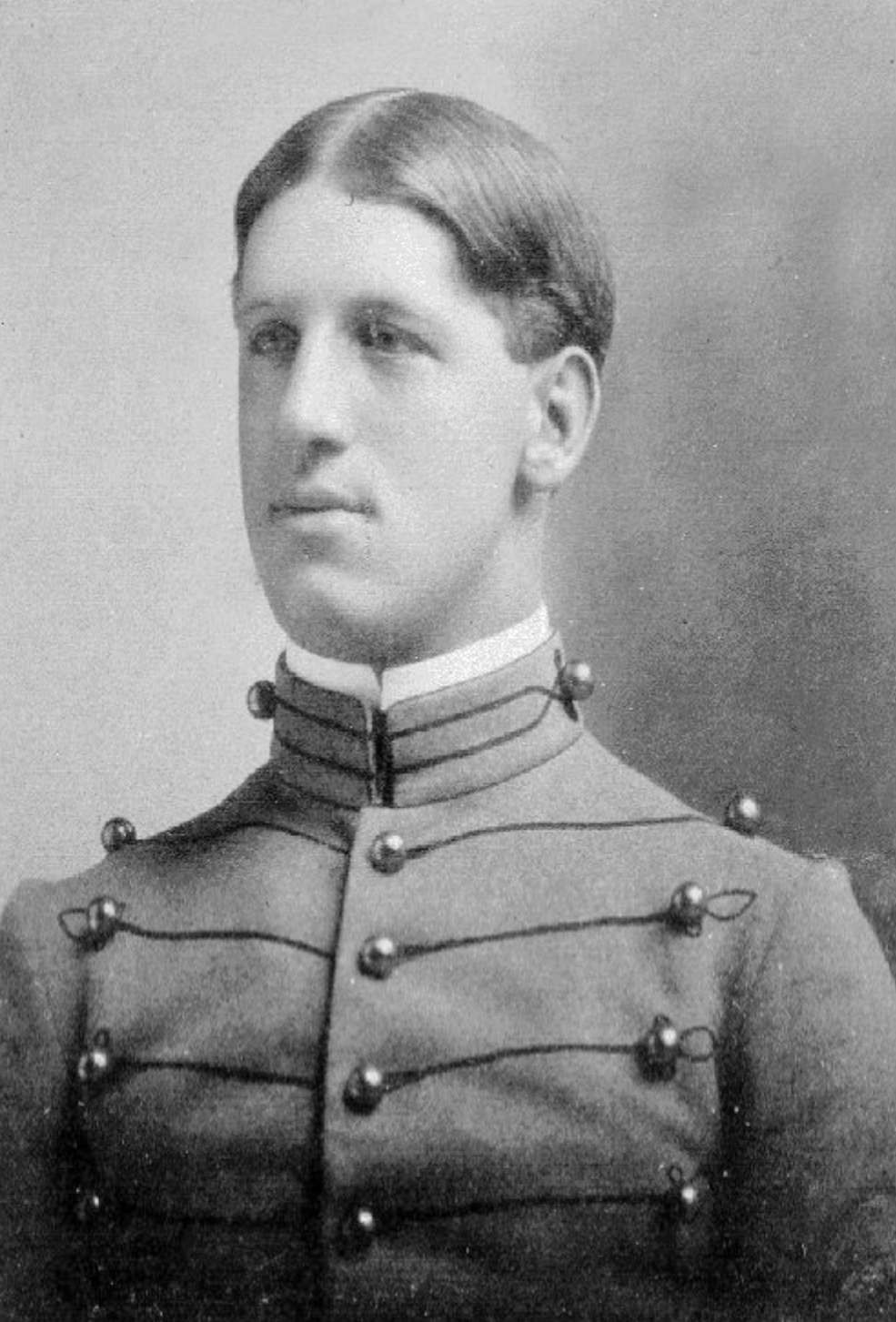
At West Point in 1899

Embick was born in Greencastle, Franklin County, Pennsylvania on January 22, 1877. He attended Dickinson College before enrolling at the United States Military Academy in West Point, New York, from which he graduated in 1899. Commissioned a second lieutenant of Artillery, he served in the occupation of Cuba following the Spanish–American War. After his service in Cuba, he served in a variety of assignments, including the staff of the Coast Artillery School at Fort Monroe, Virginia and Assistant to the Chief of Artillery in Washington, D.C.

During World War I Embick served on the staff of the Supreme War Council, and then the commission to Negotiate Peace, for which he received the Army Distinguished Service Medal. The citation for the medal reads:

The President of the United States of America, authorized by Act of Congress, July 9, 1918, takes pleasure in presenting the Army Distinguished Service Medal to Colonel (Signal Corps) Stanley Dunbar Embick, United States Army, for exceptionally meritorious and distinguished services to the Government of the United States, in a duty of great responsibility during World War I. As a member of the American Section of the Supreme War Council, by his sound military judgment, qualifications, his breadth of vision, and his sound military judgment, Colonel Embick has rendered invaluable aid in solving the many complex problems that have come before the Supreme War Council.

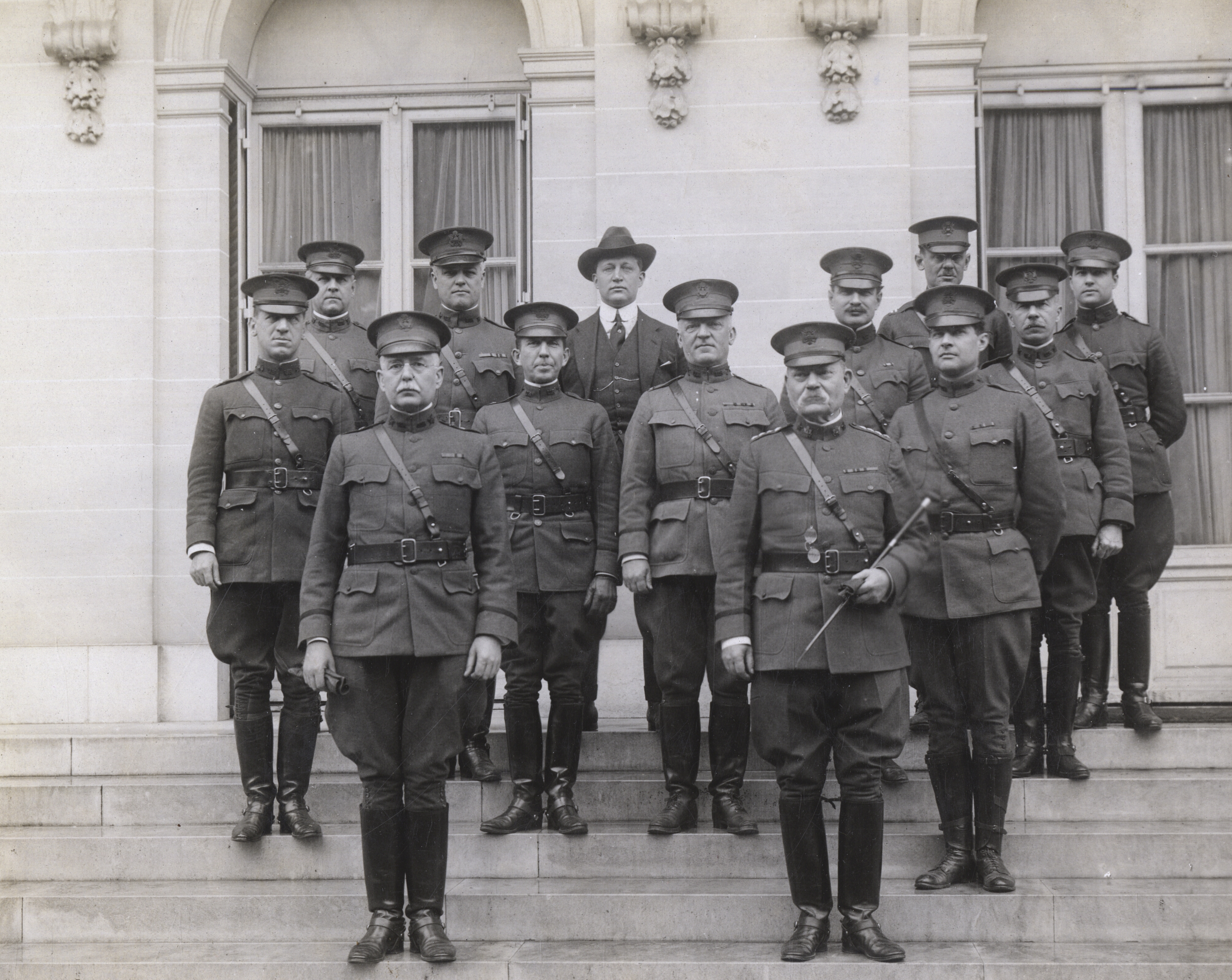
The Allied War Council at the home of General Tasker H. Bliss at Versailles, France, May 1918. Colonel Stanley D. Embick is stood in the second row, first on the left.

In December 1919 Embick was assigned to the staff of the War Department's War Plans Division, where he served until attending the Army War College. After serving as a War College instructor, Embick served in the Philippines, afterwards returning to Washington to serve as Executive Officer of the War Plans Division. In 1930 he became commandant of the Coast Artillery School.

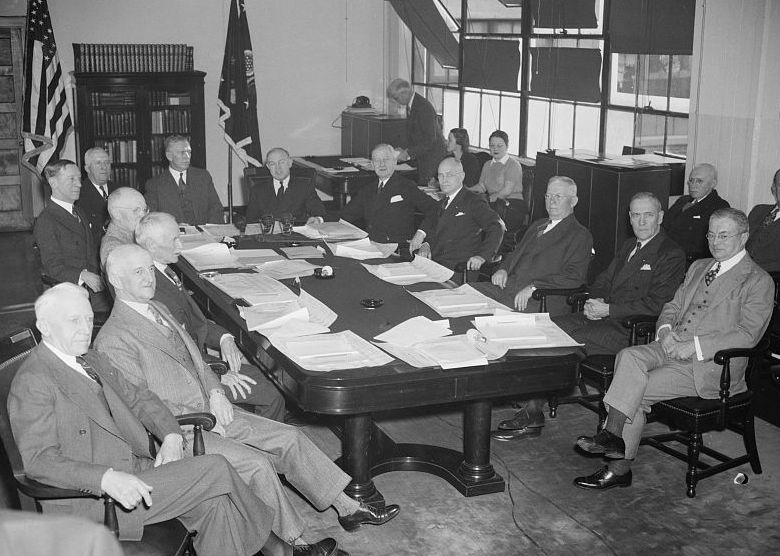
Army and corps area commanders meet with Secretary of War and Chief of Staff in Washington, D.C., Dec. 1, 1939 to plan intensive training of the army for the next six months. Lieutenant General Stanley D. Embick, commanding both the Fourth Corps Area and the Third Army, is sat fifth on the left.

In 1932 Embick was appointed commander of harbor defenses in the Philippines as a brigadier general, where he was responsible for constructing Corregidor's Malinta Tunnel, which was used as a bomb-proof storage and personnel bunker and hospital during World War II, and is now the venue for a historical audio-visual presentation about the war.

Embick became Director of the War Plans Division as a major general in 1936, and later that year was named the Army's Deputy Chief of Staff. He was appointed IV Corps commander in 1938, and later the same year took command of the Third Army as a lieutenant general, where he served until his 1941 retirement.

Embick was recalled for World War II, serving as Chief of the Joint Strategic Survey Committee, Chairman of the Inter-American Defense Board, and a delegate to the Dumbarton Oaks Conference that created the United Nations. He retired again in 1946, receiving a second Distinguished Service Medal.

== Later life ==
In the late 1940s Embick served on the commission that proposed reforms to America's military and intelligence agencies, including creation of the Department of Defense by merging the War and Navy Departments.

Embick died at Washington, D.C.'s Walter Reed Army Hospital on October 23, 1957, and was buried at Arlington National Cemetery. He was the father in law of General Albert Coady Wedemeyer.

== Awards ==
- Army Distinguished Service Medal with oak leaf cluster
- Army of Cuban Occupation Medal
- World War I Victory Medal
- American Defense Service Medal
- American Campaign Medal
- World War II Victory Medal

== Dates of rank ==
No insignia	Cadet, United States Military Academy: June 15, 1895
No pin insignia in 1899	Second lieutenant, Regular Army: February 19, 1899
	First lieutenant, Regular Army: May 8, 1901
	Captain, Regular Army: January 23, 1905
	Major, Regular Army: July 1, 1916
	Lieutenant colonel, Temporary: August 5, 1917
	Colonel, National Army: September 13, 1917
	Major, Regular Army: June 30, 1920
	Lieutenant colonel, Regular Army: July 1, 1920
	Colonel, Regular Army: September 24, 1921
	Brigadier general, Regular Army: September 1, 1930
	Major general, Regular Army: May 1, 1936
	Lieutenant general, Temporary: August 5, 1939
	Major general, Regular Army: October 1, 1940
	Major general, Retired List: February 1, 1941
	Major general, Recalled to active duty: February 1, 1941
	Lieutenant general, Army of the United States: January 7, 1942
	Lieutenant general, Retired List: June 27, 1946

== Bibliography ==
- Biographical Annals of Cumberland County, Pennsylvania, Chicago: The Genealogical Publishing Co., 1905, pages 141–143
- General Stanley D. Embick: Military Dissenter, Society for Military History, by Ronald Schaffer, 1973
- Men of West Point: The First 150 Years of the United States Military Academy, by Richard Ernest Dupuy, 1951
- Biographical Register of the Officers and Graduates of the U.S. Military Academy at West Point, New York Since its Establishment in 1802, by George Washington Cullum, 1920, Supplemental Volume VI-A, page 873
- Corregidor in Peace and War, by Charles M. Hubbard and Collis H. Davis, 2007
- Dominion or Decline: Anglo-American Naval Relations on the Pacific, 1937–1941, by Ian Cowman, 1996
- Dumbarton Oaks: The Origins of the United Nations and the Search for Postwar Security, by Robert C. Hilderbrand, 1990
- The National Cyclopaedia of American biography, by James Terry White, 1967, Volume 43, page 102

Military offices
Preceded by George Van Horn Moseley	Commanding General of the Third United States Army; 1 October 1938 – 30 September 1940	Succeeded by Herbert J. Brees
