= VI Corps Observation Group =

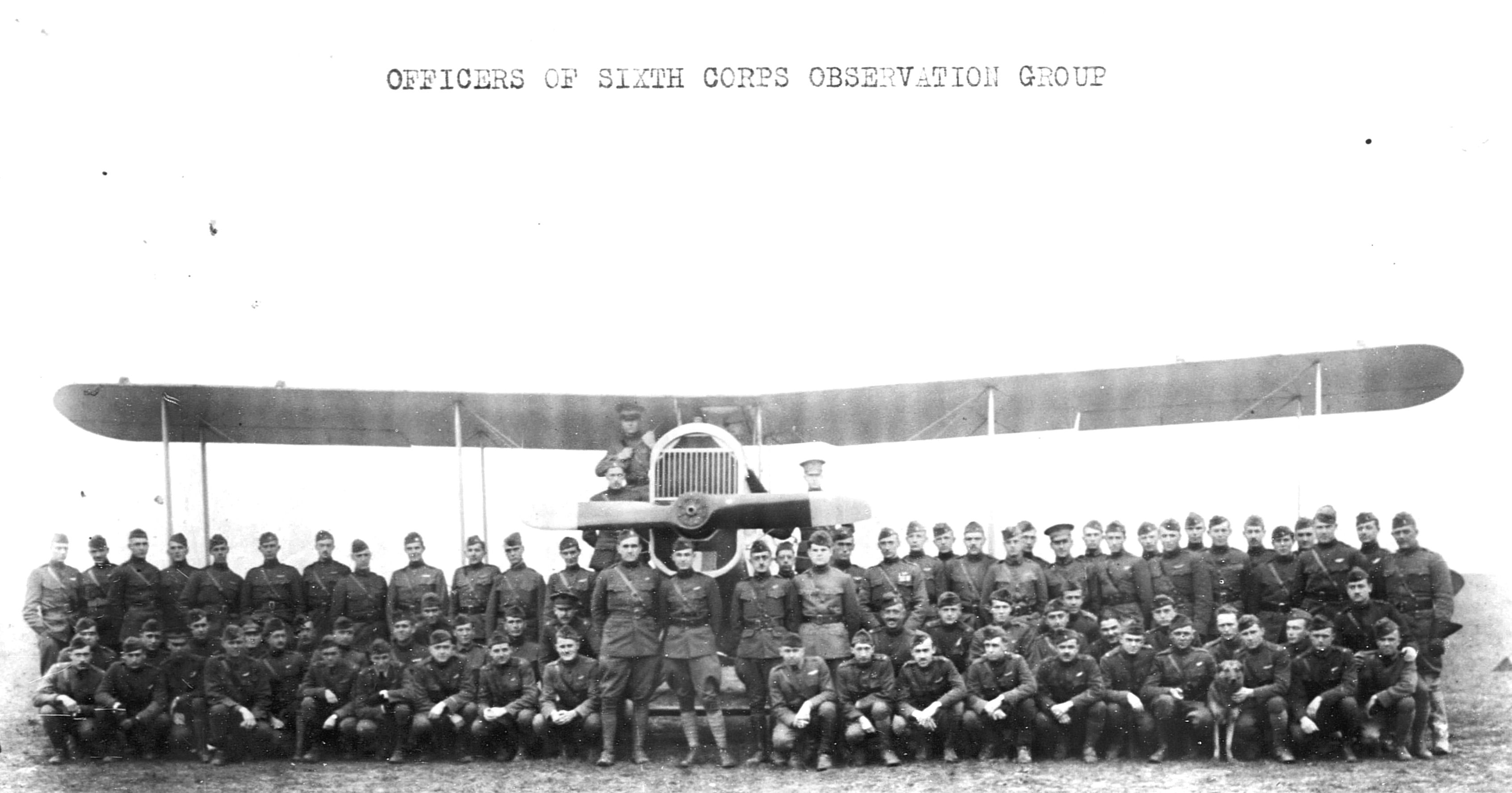
- VI Corps Observation Group officers with a De Havilland DH-4, Saizerais Airfield, France, November 1918
- Active: 23 October 1918-15 April 1919
- Country: United States
- Branch: Air Service, United States Army
- Type: Group
- Role: Command and Control
- Part of: American Expeditionary Forces (AEF)
- Engagements: World War I: 8t. Mihiel Offensive Campaign

Insignia
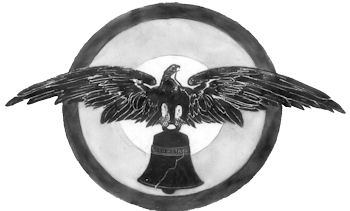
- 8th Aero Squadron Emblem

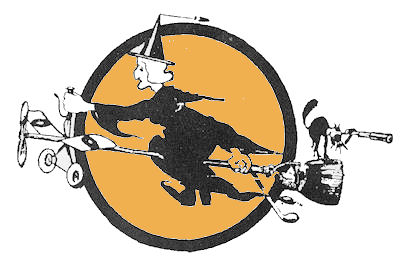
- 354th Aero Squadron Emblem

The VI Corps Observation Group was an Air Service, United States Army unit that fought on the Western Front during World War I as part of the Air Service, Second United States Army. It was demobilized in France on 15 April 1919. There is no modern United States Air Force unit that shares its lineage and history.

== History ==
Organized at Saizerais Airfield, France on 23 October 1918. At the time the group was being organized, the airfield was under construction, although it had been previously used by the French and British as an emergency landing field. The 8th Aero Squadron was assigned to the Group on 23 October, being transferred from the IV Corps. Its aircraft landed on the field and the squadron commenced operations that afternoon.

A second squadron, the 354th Aero, arrived on 23 October. The 354th was a new squadron which had just been assigned to combat duty. Along with the two flying squadrons, the 11th Photographic and an intelligence squadron was assigned to the Group. In the afternoon of the 23rd, seven pilots and seven observers were transferred from the 8th Squadron to the 354th along with eight aircraft allowing the squadron to commence operations at once. The 8th was assigned to the Sixth Corps Artillery for photographic and command work. The 354th was assigned to the 92d Division; at the time the only division assigned to VI Corps.

During the period 23 October through 9 November, the VI Corps sector was very quiet, and also the weather was very bad for flying. Nevertheless, the group took numerous aerial photographs of enemy territory, made daily visual reconnaissances and made several adjustments of artillery. It noted the enemy was forming artificial lakes at Cheminot and Mailly-sur-Seille, being formed by its engineers damning streams. A patrol on 10 November was made over enemy lines for reconnaissance of enemy infantry and artillery positions.

A morning combat patrol was made on 11 November in which all group planes patrolled the lines in compliance with orders from Second Army headquarters.

After the Armistice with Germany and the conclusion of the war, squadron flying continued on a limited basis to keep the pilots proficient in their skills. However, the main endeavors of the Group was Army administrative paperwork. The 8th Aero Squadron was ordered to proceed to the 2nd Aviation Instruction Center on Tours Aerodrome on 21 November. Second Army was ordered demobilized on 15 April 1919, and the 354th was transferred to the IV Corps Observation Group, Third Army for occupation duty in the Rhineland, Germany. Headquarters personnel were subsequently assigned to the Commanding General, Services of Supply and ordered to report to one of several staging camps in France. There, personnel awaited scheduling to report to one of the Base Ports in France for transport to the United States and subsequent demobilization.

=== Lineage ===
- Organized in France as: VI Corps Observation Group, 23 October 1918

Demobilized in France on 15 April 1919

=== Assignments ===
- Second Army Air Service, 23 October – 15 April 1919

=== Components ===
- 8th Aero Squadron (Corps Observation) 23 – October 1918
- 354th Aero Squadron (Corps Observation) 23 October 1918 – 15 April 1919

=== Stations ===
- Saizerais Airfield, France, 23 October 1918 – 15 April 1919

== See also ==
- Organization of the Air Service of the American Expeditionary Force
