= 8th Aero Squadron =

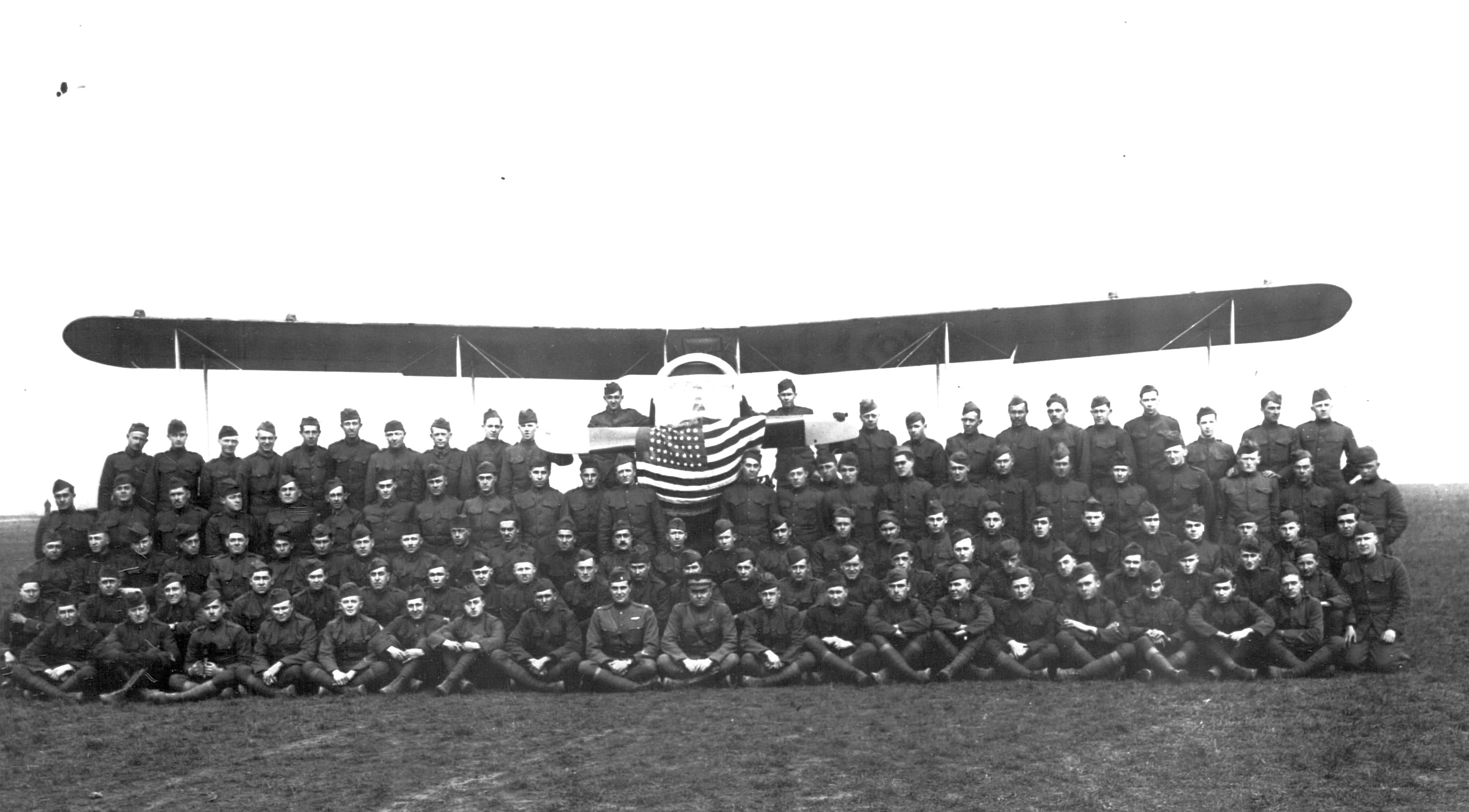
- 8th Aero Squadron, Saizerais Aerodrome, France, 11 November 1918
- Active: 21 June 1917 – 25 May 1919
- Country: United States
- Branch: Air Service, United States Army
- Type: Squadron
- Role: Corps Observation
- Part of: American Expeditionary Forces (AEF)
- Engagements: World War I

Commanders
- Notable commanders: Capt. John G. Winant

Insignia
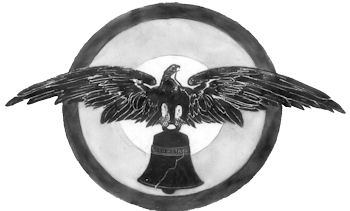
- 8th Aero Squadron Emblem

Aircraft flown
- Reconnaissance: Dayton-Wright DH-4, 1918–1919
- Trainer: Curtiss JN-4, 1917

Service record
- Operations: IV Corps Observation Group; VI Corps Observation Group; Western Front, France: 14 August-11 November 1918: Enemy Aircraft shot down: 4; Killed: 4; Wounded: 2; Missing: 3 (2 POW, escaped, returned to duty); Aircraft lost:

The 8th Aero Squadron was an Air Service, United States Army unit that fought on the Western Front during World War I.

The squadron was assigned as a Corps Observation Squadron, performing short-range, tactical reconnaissance over the IV Corps, United States First Army sector of the Western Front in France, providing battlefield intelligence. IV Corps was transferred to the United States Second Army in October 1918 for a planned offensive drive on Metz which was cancelled due to the 1918 Armistice with Germany on 11 November.

The squadron returned to the United States in June 1919 and became part of the permanent United States Army Air Service in 1921, being re-designated as the 8th Squadron (Surveillance).

The current United States Air Force unit which holds its lineage and history is the 8th Special Operations Squadron, assigned to the 1st Special Operations Wing, Hurlburt Field, Florida.

== History ==
=== Origins ===
The 8th Aero Squadron was drawn from enlisted personnel of the 2d Company "I" Provisional aviation camp, Kelly Field, Texas. After a short period of training at Kelly Field, the squadron moved to Selfridge Field, Michigan, on 5 July 1917. Together with the 9th Aero Squadron, the 8th helped to construct the new flying field. For three and a half months, the 8th Aero Squadron was engaged in training, the flight cadets completing primary aviation flight training, including soloing on Curtiss JN-4 "Jenny" trainers.

By mid October, the squadron was placed on alert for overseas duty, and on the 27th, the 8th Aero moved to Aviation Concentration Center, Garden City, New York to await transportation overseas, and spent the next month being trained in the fundamentals of soldiering.

On 22 November, the squadron was ordered on board the RMS Carpathia, arriving at Liverpool, England, on 7 December, moving on to the American Rest Camp "Winnaldon", near Winchester. There, the squadron was divided into four Flights, which were sent to several Royal Flying Corps Airdromes for additional training. The squadron was re-assembled at RFC Thetford on 1 May 1918 for final training, and was ordered to France on 16 July.

=== Combat in France ===
The squadron crossed the English Channel on the night of the 17th, arriving at Le Havre and proceeded to the Air Service Replacement Concentration Center at St. Maixent Replacement Barracks. After a short stay, it was classified as a Corps Observation squadron and ordered to the 1st Observation Group School at Amanty Airdrome, arriving on 31 July. At Amanty, the squadron was equipped with American-made Dayton-Wright DH-4 aircraft, the second squadron equipped with the aircraft to reach the Western Front. In addition, owing to the short distance from the front, two weeks of intensive training was given to the pilots and observers, flying over enemy territory.

On 31 August the squadron was moved by train to Ourches Aerodrome from which it would fly combat missions. There the squadron became part of the IV Corps Observation Group and was attached as a Divisional Observation Squadron to the First Division. The squadron was immediately engaged in combat duty, flying photographic and reconnaissance missions over the St. Mihiel Salient. On 29 September, the entire IV Corps Group moved up to Croix de Metz Aerodrome, situated about two kilometers northeast of Toul, Meurthe et Moselle, France. The squadron remained here little less than a month. During this time considerable work was accomplished; at the suggestion of Col. Kahn, two photographic planes were sent out on single missions with protection, instead of one aircraft. On such a trip made 25 September, a string of pictures covering some forty kilometers were taken. This was one of the longest, if not the longest, strip photographed by an American Observation squadron on a single mission. One of the duties assigned the squadron at this time was photographing the entire Corps front to a depth of ten kilometers, an area of 600 square kilometers. A large number of these pictures had been taken before the squadron was transferred to the VI Corps.

On 8 October 1st Lt. Edward R. Moore and 1st Lt. Gardner P. Allen while on a photographic mission displayed extraordinary heroism for which they were later awarded the Distinguished Service Cross. The next day, 1st Lt. Robert J. Cochran and 1st Lt. Claude S. Garrett, Flight commander of Flight "C" were brought down in flames while taking pictures. They, with three other planes, were attacked by twenty-six German aircraft. Three German planes were brought down, two by Sgt. F.G. Smith and one by Lt. S. Chambers.

On 23 October, the squadron was moved to Saizerais Aerodrome and attached to the VI Army Corps, where shortly after arrival it was joined by the 354th Aero squadron. This squadron had just arrived on the front and in order to place experienced flyers in the squadron, Major McNarney ordered seven pilots and seven observers transferred to the 354th Squadron. While at Saizerais and before the Armistice was signed, five officers were lost. Both at Toul and Saizerais a number of successful voluntary bombing missions were carried out. While at Saizerais, one German aircraft was destroyed and officially credited to Lt. F. B. Fort and Sergeant B.B. Cook.

=== Post-Armistice activities ===
The 8th Aero Squadron was engaged in active combat in France for about two and one-half months. They logged over 900 combat hours on photographic/bombing missions in the Dayton-Wright DH-4, "Liberty Plane", with only one forced landing and four enemy aircraft kills credited.

On 5 February 1919, G-3 order.s NJ. 129, Headquarters, Second Army, was received relieving the squadron from the II and VI Army Corps, with instructions to proceed by truck train to the 1st Air Depot, Colombey-les-Belles Airdrome, for preparation to return to the United States. Under G.H.Q. orders, only ten officers were allowed to be taken with the squadron, so it became necessary to detach the surplus officers. The DH-4 aircraft were to be delivered to Air Service Production Center No. 2. at Romorantin Aerodrome, a distance of about four hundred miles from the airdrome. One plane, however, was transferred to the 354th Squadron. The flight leaders were given orders to land at Orly Field, near Paris, for gas and oil and then proceed to their destination. One plane was forced to land because of losing the drain plug from its water pump while in the air. A safe landing was made, however, and the plane was later flown to destination. By 9:00 P.M. 8 February 1919, all planes had been heard from and were safe. The 8th Aero Squadron then became a ground unit.

On 19 February, the squadron entrained at Barisey-la-Cote, for St. Andre-de-Culizac. Seven box cars were assigned the squadron for officers and men. Five days were consumed on the move to Bordeaux where, upon arrival, billets were assigned to officers and men in the small village of Fargues-Saint-Hilaire. The billets were the usual French rooms but the men were very comfortable. The squadron commander and his adjutant were assigned one of the largest chateaux in the village, splendidly furnished and equipped with billiard tables and a huge library.

The squadron remained there until 19 April spending the time in preparing for embarkation. It then moved by marching to Camp Genicort, a distance of about ten kilometers, and went through the delousing mill the same day. On 20 April, the reign of terror of final preparation for return was completed and found the squadron on board the USS Pastores with the shores of La Belle, France, receding in the distance. On 2 May 1919, the squadron debarked and moved by ferry and train to Camp Mills, Garden City, Long Island, and was once again deloused. On 3 May the organization moved to Mitchell Field, Long Island, and the work of transferring the enlisted men to different cantonments for discharge commenced. This was completed by 20 May and the squadron then consisted of one officer, 1st Lt. Walter Bender, and eight men, all of whom were on furlough.

The squadron was then sent back to Kelly Field, Texas on 25 May 1919. One officer and the squadron records were transferred to Kelly Field, Texas. After reorganization at Kelly Field, Texas on 5 July 1919 in which one officer and 150 men were assigned from Rockwell Field, California.

=== Lineage ===
- Organized as 8th Aero Squadron on 21 June 1917

Re-designated: 8th Aero Squadron (Corps Observation), 31 July 1918
Re-designated: 8th Aero Squadron, 3 May 1919
Re-designated: 8th Surveillance Squadron, 25 May 1919

=== Assignments ===
- Post Headquarters, Kelly Field, 21 June 1917
- Post Headquarters, Selfridge Field, 8 July 1917
- Aviation Concentration Center, 28 October 1917
- Headquarters American Rest Camp, 8 December 1917
- Air Service Headquarters, AEF, British Isles, 24 December 1917

Attached to: Royal Flying Corps for training

- Headquarters American Air Service Camp, 18 July 1918
- Air Service Replacement Concentration Center, 20 July 1918
- IV Corps Observation Group, 31 August 1918

Attached to: First Division, AEF, 8–14 Sep 1918

- VI Corps Observation Group, 23 October 1918
- 2d Air Instructional Center, 21 November 1919
- 1st Air Depot, 5 February 1919
- Commanding General, Services of Supply, February-20 Apr 1919
- Post Headquarters, Mitchell Field, 3 May 1919
- Post Headquarters, Kelly Field, 25 May 1919

=== Stations ===
- Kelly Field, Texas, 21 June 1917
- Selfridge Field, Michigan, 8 July 1917
- Aviation Concentration Center, Garden City, New York, 28 Oct-22 Nov 1917
- Port of Entry, Hoboken, New Jersey

Overseas transport, RMS Carpathia, 22 November-7 December 1917

- Winchester, England, 8 December 1917
- RFC Dartford, England, c. 24 December 1917

Detachments at RFC Thetford, RFC Wyton, and RFC Northolt, England

- RFC Thetford, England, 1 May-17 Jul 1918
- Le Havre, France, 18 July 1918
- St. Maixent Replacement Barracks, France, 20 July 1918
- Amanty Airdrome, France, 31 July 1918
- Ourches Aerodrome, France, 31 August 1918
- Croix de Metz Aerodrome (Toul), France, 29 September 1918
- Saizerais Aerodrome, France, 23 October 1918
- Tours Aerodrome, France, 21 November 1918
- Colombey-les-Belles Airdrome, France, 5 February 1919
- Fargues-Saint-Hilaire, France, 22 Feb-18 Apr 1919

Return transport, USS Pastores, 20 April-2 May 1919

- Mitchel Field, New York, 3 May 1919
- Kelly Field, Texas, 25 May 1919

=== Combat sectors and campaigns ===
Streamer	Sector/Campaign	Dates	Notes
	St. Mihiel Offensive Campaign	12–16 September 1918	
	Toul Sector	17 September-11 November 1918	

=== Notable personnel ===
- Lt. Gardner P. Allen, DSC
- Lt. Claude S. Garrett, Flight Leader, KIA
- Lt. Edward R. Moore, DSC
- Lt. Charles E. Whitehouse
- Capt. John G. Winant
- Capt. William B. Wynn, SSC

DSC: Distinguished Service Cross; SSC: Silver Star Citation; KIA: Killed in Action

== See also ==
- Organization of the Air Service of the American Expeditionary Force
- List of American Aero Squadrons
