= Autreville Airdrome =

- Part of American Expeditionary Forces (AEF)
- Located near: Autreville, Vosges, France
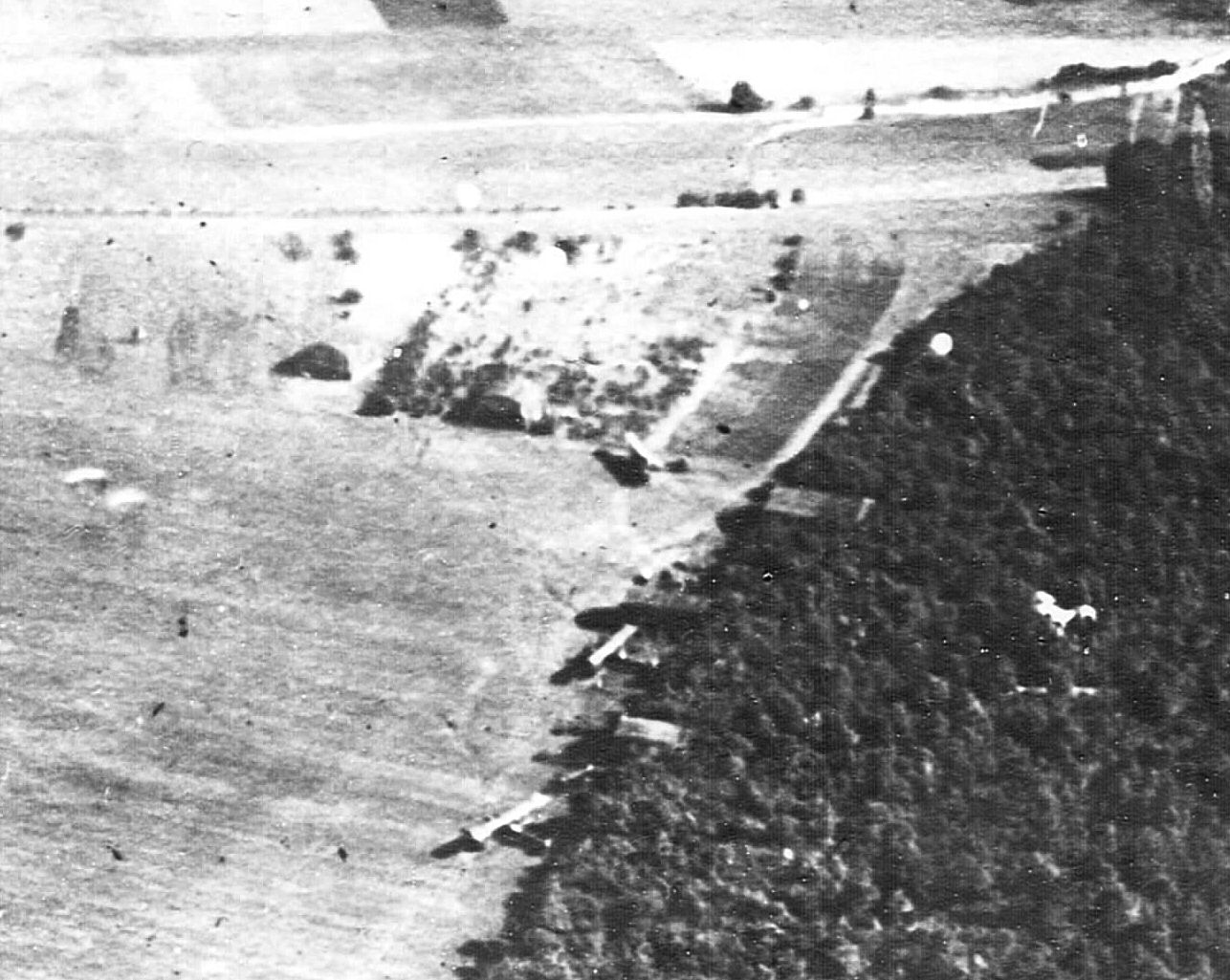
- Dayton-Wright DH-4s of the VII Corps Observation Group at Autreville Airdrome, October, 1919

Site information
- Type: Combat Airfield
- Controlled by: Air Service, United States Army
- Condition: Agricultural area

Location
- Coordinates: 48°27′38″N 005°49′41″E

Site history
- Built: 1918
- In use: 1918–1919
- Battles/wars: World War I

Garrison information
- Garrison: VII Corps Observation Group; United States First Army Air Service

Autreville Airdrome was a temporary World War I airfield in France, used by the United States First Army Air Service. It was located 9 miles (14 km) south of Toul, at the northern tip of the Vosges department in northeastern France, near the large depot of Colombey-les-Belles.

== Overview ==
Autreville Airdrome was one of the first airfields selected in the Toul sector for the Air Service. However, since it was 45 kilometers from the front at the time it was chosen for development, was used by the United States First Army Air Service as both a long-distance strategic reconnaissance airfield as well as for battlefield tactical reconnaissance.

The Airdrome was obtained by the Air Service on 7 March 1918. It consisted of 268 acres of land, with a capacity of four aero squadrons and one-half a Park (Support) squadron. Buildings were constructed in a forested area next to the airfield for camouflage from enemy aircraft; works were performed by two Construction squadron: 477th Aero Squadron 28 March to 12 June, and 482nd Aero Squadron 28 March to early July. On the Airdrome at the time of the November 1918 armistice consisted of 33 barracks and mess hals, two maintenance shops, 6 supply warehouses and a total of twenty-one French "Bessonneau" aircraft hangars. There were a total of eight administration buildings, and a small medical clinic.

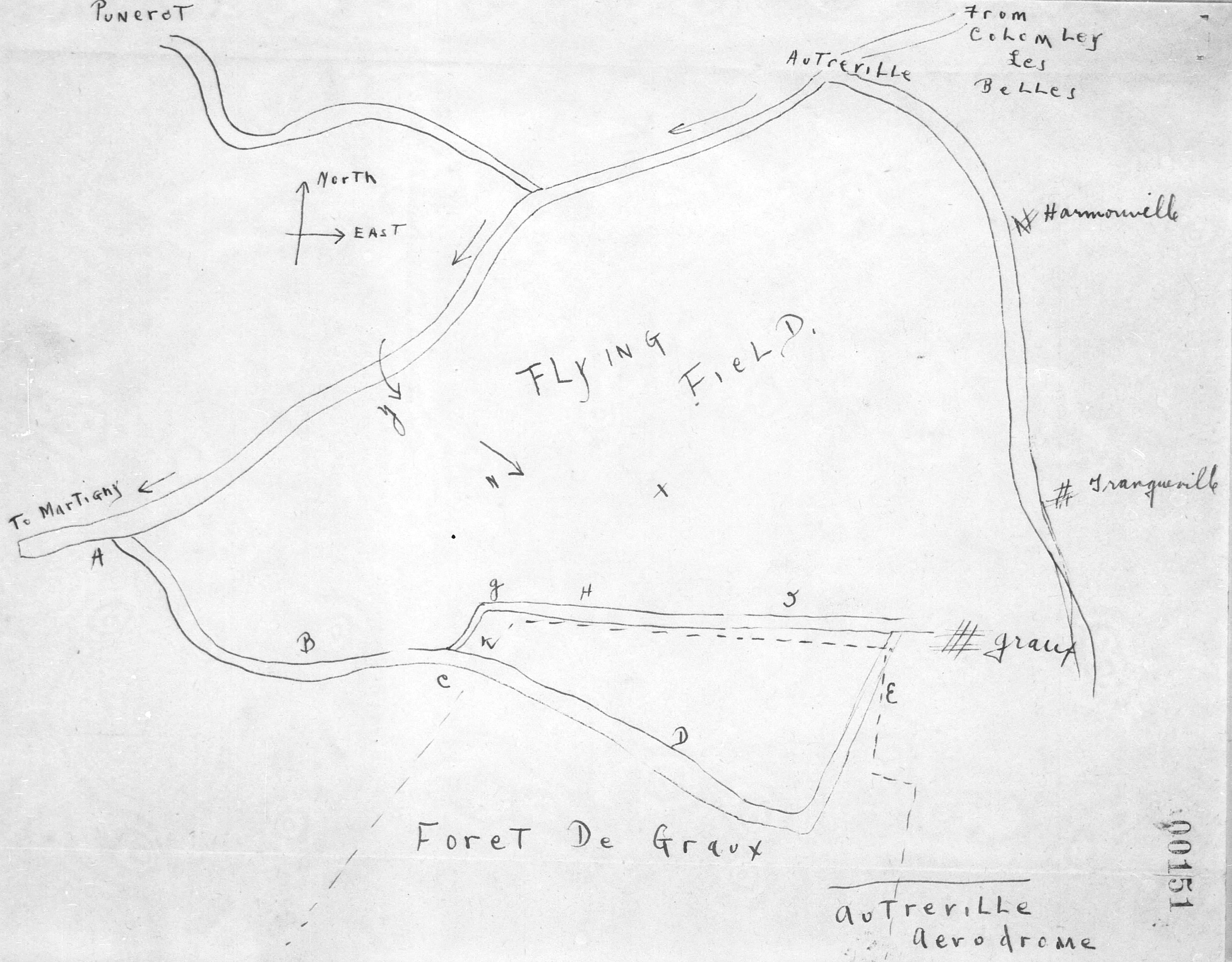
Drawing made by the 482d Aero Squadron (Construction) of Autreville Airdrome

The airfield was mostly completed by the summer of 1918 with the exception of hangars, as the construction of the flying field was given priority. In the first week of August, Royal Air Force Handley-Page O/100 bombers arrived at the airfield from Ochey, after a bombing raid there had caused considerable damage. The British erected five hangars on the field. From Autreville, the RAF carried out a night bombing raid on Cologne before returning to Ochey by the end of September.

In mid September, the first United States units began to arrive - 168th and 186th Aero Sqn, although without any aircraft, having just been released from the 1st Air Depot in nearby Colombey les Belles; they probably trained joining operational groups. Two more squadrons arrived in late September, along with Salmson 2A2 and Dayton-Wright DH-4 aircraft, also being released from the 1st Air Depot, the squadrons taking part in the Meuse-Argonne Offensive when properly trained. The last one was gone by 10 November.

In preparation for a joint drive by the American Second Army and the French on Metz in November, arrangements were made for two additional French hangars to be shipped to Autreville from Lay-St. Remy; two French escadrilles were ordered to Autreville, both working for the French 1st Cavalry Corps with 10th Fr. Army, but they reached Autreville after the Armistice was signed; they had left Autreville by the end of November. The last unit to fly through the airfield was seen in February 1919, escadrille R 246, on its way to Germany.

Known units assigned to Autreville Airdrome were:

- 168th Aero Squadron (training before joining IV Corps Obs. Group) 2 Sept 1918 – 5 Oct 1918
- 186th Aero Squadron (training before joining First Army Obs. Group), 18 September 1918 – 29 October 1918 (Salmson 2A2)
- 354th Aero Squadron (training, then VI Corps Obs. Group on 21 Oct), 30 Sept 1918 – 25 Oct 1918 (Dayton-Wright DH-4)
- 278th Aero Squadron (VII Corps Obs. Group), 1 Oct 1918 – 10 Nov 1918 (Dayton-Wright DH-4)

In the following weeks after the armistice in November 1918, the airfield was abandoned and turned to the 1st Air Depot for de-construction. All hangars and other structures were dismantled and all useful supplies and equipment were removed and sent back to the Depot for storage. Upon completion, the land turned over to the French government.

Eventually the land was returned to agricultural use by the local farmers. The site today is a series of cultivated fields located on the south side of the Départmental 674 (D674), about 2 miles north-east of Martigny-les-Gerbonvaux, with no indications of its wartime use. The wooded area to the west of the Airfield remains a forested area.

== See also ==
- List of Air Service American Expeditionary Force aerodromes in France
