= Lemmes Aerodrome =

French WWI airfield

- Part of American Expeditionary Forces (AEF)
- Located near: Lemmes, France Lemmes Aerodrome (France)

Site information
- Type: Combat Airfield
- Controlled by: Air Service, United States Army
- Condition: Agricultural area

Location
- Coordinates: 49°04′11″N 005°16′19″E

Site history
- Built: 1918
- In use: 1918–1919
- Battles/wars: World War I

Garrison information
- Garrison: First Army Observation Group; United States First Army Air Service

Lemmes Aerodrome, was a temporary World War I airfield in France, used predominantly by the French Air Service, and briefly by the Air Service, United States Army. It was located 0.6 miles (0.97 km) West-Northwest of the commune of Lemmes, and approximately 9 miles (14 km) south-west of Verdun, in the Meuse department in Lorraine in north-eastern France.

== Overview ==
The airfield was one of the major airfields used by the French Air Service about Verdun, from early 1916 to the end of the war, with Vadelaincourt other major airfield touching it.

For probably some operational reason, the American 186th Aero Squadron moved here from nearby Souilly Aerodrome on 7 November 1918, already back there on 24 November, after the Armistice had been signed.

Eventually, the airfield was returned to agricultural use. Today it is a series of cultivated fields located northwest of Lemmes. The airfield was located west of the D 1916, which takes its symbolic number from the fact that it was the only road always open during the Battle of Verdun for bringing supplies to the city and the front units.

== See also ==
- List of Air Service American Expeditionary Force aerodromes in France
