= 258th Aero Squadron =

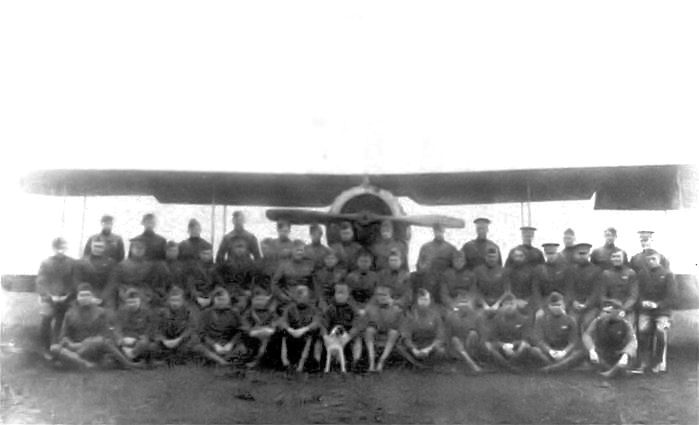
- 258th Aero Squadron (with its mascot) in front of a squadron Salmson 2A2, Manonville Airdrome, France, November 1918
- Active: 14 February 1918 – 1 August 1919
- Country: United States
- Branch: United States Army Air Service
- Type: Squadron
- Role: Corps Observation
- Part of: American Expeditionary Forces (AEF)
- Engagements: World War I Occupation of the Rhineland

Commanders
- Notable commanders: Lt. George F. Hughes

Insignia
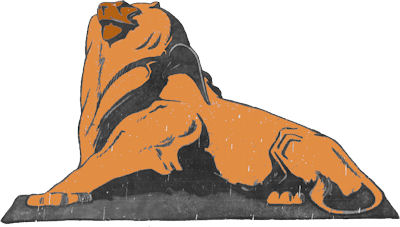
- 258th Aero Squadron Emblem

Aircraft flown
- Reconnaissance: Salmson 2A2, 1918–1919; Dayton-Wright DH-4, 1919

Service record
- Operations: VII Corps Observation Group; Western Front, France: 10 September-11 November 1918

The 258th Aero Squadron was a United States Army Air Service unit that fought on the Western Front during World War I.

The squadron was assigned as a Corps Observation Squadron, performing short-range, tactical reconnaissance over the VII Corps, United States First Army sector of the Western Front in France, providing battlefield intelligence. After the 1918 Armistice with Germany, the squadron was assigned to the United States Third Army as part of the Occupation of the Rhineland in Germany. It returned to the United States in August 1919 and was demobilized.

There is no current United States Air Force or Air National Guard successor unit.

== History ==
=== Origins ===
The 258th Aero Squadron was temporarily formed on 1 January 1918 at 02:00 out of a sleepy contingent of men at Kelly Field, Texas which were lined up in formation and assigned to the unit. The men were ordered to Camp MacArthur, Waco, Texas on 14 February where the squadron was formally organized and designated. After several weeks of drill and instruction in soldiering, on 1 March the 258th was ordered to Wilbur Wright Field, Fairfield, Ohio for technical training in which the men were classified based on their ability for the line of work which they would be assigned.

On short notice, the squadron was notified to move to the Aviation Concentration Center, Hazelhurst Field (Field #1), New York at which they arrived on 23 March. The squadron, along with the 257th AS were given the duty of preparing a tent encampment. When erected, the squadron was sent to Mineola Field (#2, later Mitchel Field) to receive training in the uncrating and assembly of airplanes. As part of their duties at Mineola, the squadron erected another tent camp which was used for receiving new aircraft. It was designated "Acceptance Park". On 29 May, orders were received for overseas duty, the squadron boarding the SS President Grant. It arrived at Brest, France on 12 June, where the squadron was assigned to a Rest Camp. From Brest, it boarded a troop train, arriving at the St. Maixent Replacement Barracks on 17 July. After a week at the Replacement Concentration Center being equipped for duty, it was ordered to proceed to the 3d Air Instructional Center at Issoudun Aerodrome for combat training. It arrived at the 3d AIC on 24 July, where it was temporarily assigned to Field #3 (Solo Flying, Cross Country, basic aerobatics training). It was later reassigned to Field #9 where it was engaged in maintenance work of Nieuport 18M aircraft.

=== Combat in France ===
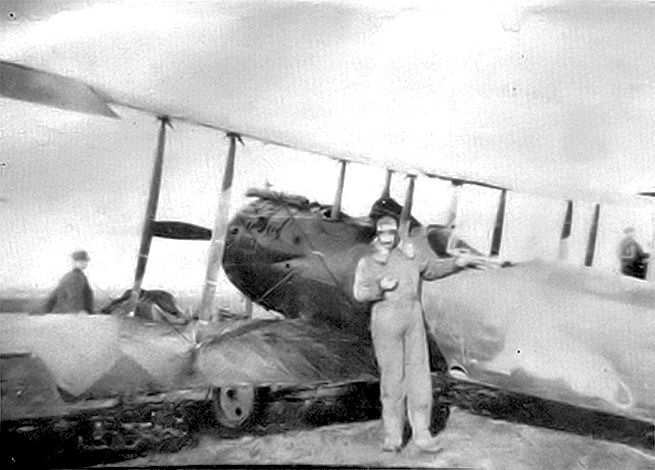
An unidentified pilot from the 258th Aero Squadron standing next to his Salmson 2A2 at Manonville Airdrome, France, November 1918. Note the squadron emblem on the fuselage.

Several pilots and observers were assigned to the squadron on 19 September and the 258th was designated as a Corps Observation, being assigned to the VII Corps Observation Group at Luxeuil-les-Bains Aerodrome. Luxeuil, although in the "Zone of Advance" (the Western Front), was primarily an equipping and organizing station, but not far from the lines to operate from. Also at Luxeuil, the squadron was equipped with 24 Salmson 2A2 reconnaissance aircraft, which were ferried from Orly Field, near Paris. However, only five squadron pilots were available, and the 258th remained at Luxeuil awaiting additional personnel. According to the squadron history, the members of the squadron were extremely frustrated at the time, being ready to go into combat with new airplanes, but without adequate numbers of pilots and observers. However, the squadron took advantage of the opportunity to familiarize themselves with the local area, practicing formation flying along and over the front, although not on any ordered missions. German Anti-Aircraft Artillery fire was received although the Germans did not challenge the Salmsons with any Fokkers or other pursuit planes. On one patrol along the line, one of the observers noted some planes he judged to be German.

Also, while waiting for additional pilots and observers, the 258th conducted a school for infantry officers in liaison work with observation planes. Instruction was provided to officers of the 7th, 81st and 88th Divisions of VII Corps. The shortage of pilots and observers meant the squadron remained at Luxeuil until 31 October when it finally was ordered into combat and moved to Mathay Aerodrome on 31 October. Its mission was to provide reconnaissance for the French 7th Army, being the first AEF squadron to patrol around Altkirch and Mulhouse. For the next eleven days, the squadron flew over the lines. German aircraft were encountered but never attacked the squadron's formations, however the German Anti-Aircraft fire was very effective and active. It then was ordered to fly reconnaissance over the city of Metz.

=== Third Army of Occupation ===
Airplane on airfield at Weissenthurm, Rhineland, Germany.

The squadron remained at Mathay Aerodrome (with Second Army Air Services since 7 November), then at Grand Aerodrome from 18 November until being assigned to Weißenthurm Airdrome, Germany on 15 April 1919 to serve as part of the occupation force of the Rhineland under the Third Army Air Service, III Corps Observation Group.

There, the squadron began a series of photo-reconnaissance flights in the occupied Rhineland of major manufacturing centers, important cities and towns in both Occupied Germany as well as Luxembourg. Lines of communication (railroads, rivers and roads) were carefully mapped and photographed. It also operated some Dayton-Wright DH-4s at Weißenthurm during the summer of 1919 when the Salmsons were returned to the French. In addition, squadron was able to perform test flights on surrendered German aircraft. Flights of the Fokker D.VII, Pfalz D.XII, Halberstadts and Rumpler aircraft were made and evaluations were made.

=== Demobilization ===
On 18 July 1919 orders were received from Third Army for the squadron to report to the 1st Air Depot, Colombey-les-Belles Airdrome to turn in all of its supplies and equipment and was relieved from duty with the AEF. The squadron's Salmson aircraft were delivered to the Air Service American Air Service Acceptance Park No. 1 at Orly Aerodrome to be returned to the French. There practically all of the pilots and observers were detached from the squadron.

Personnel at Colombey were subsequently assigned to the commanding general, services of supply, and ordered to report to one of several staging camps in France. There, personnel awaited scheduling to report to one of the base ports in France for transport to the United States and subsequent demobilization. The 258th Aero Squadron was demobilized at Mitchell Field, New York on 1 August 1919.

=== Lineage ===
- Temporarily formed on 1 January 1918

Organized and designated as 258th Aero Squadron on 14 February 1918
Re-designated: 258th Aero Squadron (Corps Observation), 19 September 1918
Demobilized, 1 August 1919

=== Assignments ===
- Post Headquarters, Kelly Field, 1 January 1918
- Post Headquarters, Camp MacArthur, 14 February 1918
- Post Headquarters, Wilbur Wright Field, 1 March 1918
- Aviation Concentration Center, 23 March 1918
- Air Service Replacement Concentration Center, AEF, 17 July 1918
- 3d Air Instructional Center, 24 July 1918
- VII Corps Observation Group, 19 September 1918
- Second Army Air Service, 7 November 1918
- III Corps Observation Group, 15 April 1919
- 1st Air Depot, 12 May 1919
- Commanding General, Services of Supply, May–July 1919
- Post Headquarters, Mitchel Field, 1 August 1919

=== Stations ===
- Kelly Field, Texas, 1 January 1918
- Camp MacArthur, Texas, 14 February 1918
- Wilbur Wright Field, Ohio, 1 March 1918
- Hazelhurst Field, New York, 23 March 1918
- Aviation Concentration Center, Garden City, New York, New York, 1 April 1918
- Port of Entry, Hoboken, New Jersey

Overseas transport, SS President Grant, 29 May – 12 June 1918

- Brest, France, 12 June 1918
- St. Maixent Replacement Barracks, France, 17 July 1918
- Issoudun Aerodrome, France, 24 July 1918
- Luxeuil-les-Bains Aerodrome, France, 19 September 1919
- Mathay Aerodrome, France, 31 October 1918
- Manonville Aerodrome, France, 11 November 1918
- Grand Aerodrome, France, 18 November 1918
- Weißenthurm Aerodrome, Germany, 15 April 1919
- Colombey-les-Belles Airdrome, France, 12 May 1919
- France, May–July 1919
- Mitchell Field, New York, 1 August 1919

=== Enemy aircraft flown for evaluation ===
- Evaluated Fokker D.VII, Pfalz D.XII, Halberstadt and Rumpler aircraft, 1919

=== Combat sectors and campaigns ===
Streamer	Sector/Campaign	Dates	Notes
	Vosges Sector	31 October-10 November 1918	

== See also ==
- Organization of the Air Service of the American Expeditionary Force
- List of American aero squadrons
