= Trier-Föhren Airfield =

Trier-Föhren Airport Flugplatz Trier-Föhren
- IATA: none; ICAO: EDRT

Summary
- Airport type: Public
- Operator: Bundeswehr / Flugplatz GmbH Trier
- Serves: Trier, Germany
- Location: Föhren
- Elevation AMSL: 665 ft (203 m)
- Coordinates: 49°51′48″N 006°47′17″E
- Website: www.Flugplatz-Trier.de

Map
- Location in Rhineland-Palatinate, Germany

Runways
Direction	Length		Surface
Direction	m	ft	Surface
05/23	1,200^{†}	3,937^{†}	Concrete
- ^{†}1,130 m (3,707 ft): takeoff on 05/landing on 23. Sources: AIRPORTS.DE,

Trier-Föhren Airfield (German: Flugplatz Trier-Föhren) (ICAO: EDRT) serves Trier, a city in Rhineland-Palatinate, Germany. It is located in Föhren, 8 nautical miles (15 km; 9 mi) northeast of Trier and approximately 340 miles (547 km) southwest of Berlin. The airfield supports general aviation, with no commercial airline service available. Charter services and a full selection of amenities are available.

The current field is a recent facility, opened in 1977, built about 18 km from the site of the historic Trier Airfield built in the early 20th century.

== History ==
Trier-Föhren Airfield was built from scratch to replace the old Trier Airfield in the 1970s. It is next to the village of Föhren. A French army garrison formerly at Trier Airfield also moved to Föhren until it was disbanded in the 1990s. Since then, the "Industriepark Region Trier" was developed on its former site.

== Facilities ==
The airfield resides at an elevation of 665 feet (203 m) above mean sea level. It has one runway designated 05/23 with a concrete surface measuring 1,200 by 30 metres (3,937 ft × 98 ft).

== See also ==
- Transport in Germany
- List of airports in Germany
