= 278th Aero Squadron =

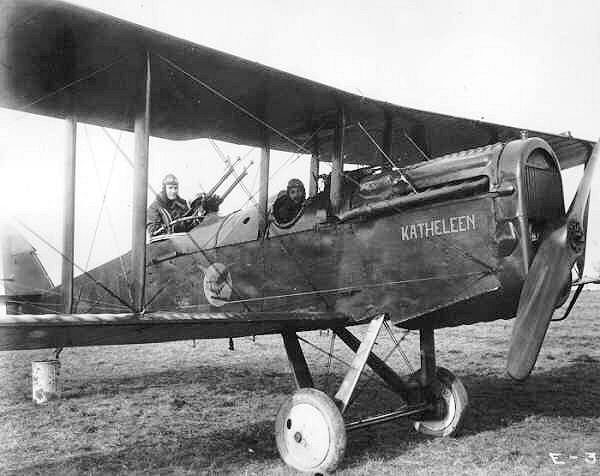
- Dayton-Wright DH-4 observation aircraft "Katheleen" flown by the 278th Aero Squadron
- Active: 14 February 1918 – 13 June 1919
- Country: United States
- Branch: United States Army Air Service
- Type: Squadron
- Role: Corps Observation
- Part of: American Expeditionary Forces (AEF)
- Engagements: World War I Occupation of the Rhineland

Commanders
- Notable commanders: Capt. Horace N. Heisen

Insignia
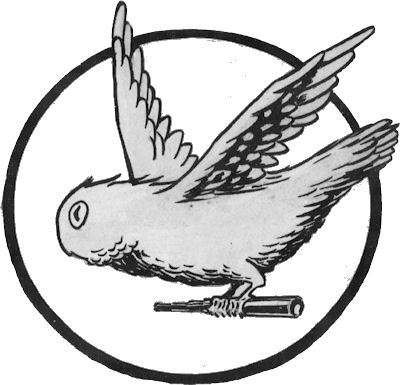
- 278th Aero Squadron Emblem

Aircraft flown
- Reconnaissance: Dayton-Wright DH-4, 1918–1919
- Trainer: Curtiss JN-4, 1918

Service record
- Operations: VII Corps Observation Group; Western Front, France: 29 October-11 November 1918

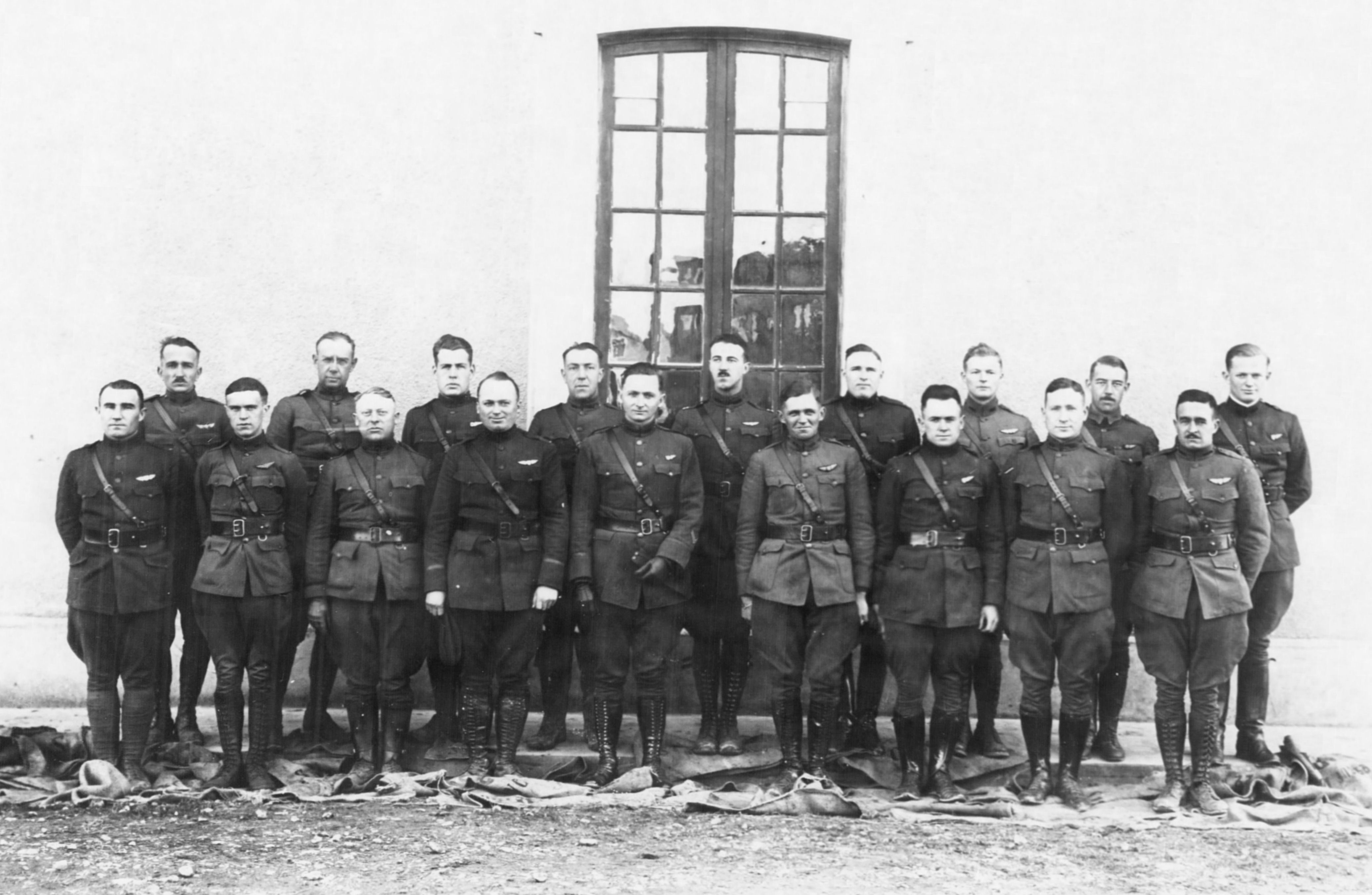
Pilots of the 278th Aero Squadron, Croix de Metz Aerodrome, Toul, France

The 278th Aero Squadron was a United States Army Air Service unit that fought on the Western Front during World War I.

The squadron was assigned as a Corps Observation Squadron, performing short-range, tactical reconnaissance over the VII Corps, United States First Army sector of the Western Front in France, providing battlefield intelligence. After the 1918 Armistice with Germany, the squadron was assigned to the United States Third Army as part of the Occupation of the Rhineland in Germany. It returned to the United States in June 1919 and was demobilzied.

There is no current United States Air Force or Air National Guard unit that holds its lineage or history.

== History ==
The 278th Aero Squadron was organized at Love Field, Dallas, Texas on 14 February 1918. The squadron was trained in various mechanics skills with the Curtiss JN-4 trainer, and other necessary skills for duty in France. It was also used to support the operations of the various departments at Love Field. However, on 8 July 1918, the squadron was ordered to report to the Aviation Concentration Center, Garden City, Long Island, for overseas duty. It was further ordered to report to the Port of Entry, Hoboken, New Jersey and on 18 August 1918, it sailed for the port of Brest, France on board the USS Von Steuben, arriving in France on 27 August after an uneventful voyage across the Atlantic Ocean.

At Brest, the squadron remained at the Pontanezen Barracks awaiting orders until 2 September when it boarded a train bound for the Replacement Concentration Center, AEF, St. Maixent Replacement Barracks for equipping, and personnel processing. It arrived at St. Maixent on 4 September and was then further ordered to proceed to the 1st Air Depot at Colombey-les-Belles Airdrome. There the men were given gas masks and trained how to use the mask with tear gas. There, the men of the 278th also heard the artillery of the Western Front for the first time of the Zone of Advance. On 1 October, it was moved to the nearby Autreville Airdrome where it began to receive pilots and observers, as well as some Dayton-Wright DH-4 observation aircraft, the squadron being designated a Corps Observation (reconnaissance) squadron. It was assigned to the First Army VII Corps Observation Group on 29 October and was ordered to the Croix de Metz Aerodrome, near Toul on 10 November.

However, the Armistice with Germany on 11 November meant the 278th Aero Squadron would not see any combat at the front. Unfortunately, the squadron did suffer a tragic incident when on 29 November, 2d Lieutenants Ogilieve and Williams were killed in a plane crash.

In "Wings of Honor" by James J. Slone Jr., Slone gives the names of the pilot and observer as Lts. Alexander K. Ogilive and Bill N. Williams, stating that they crashed and burned in their DH-4 on 29 Nov.. There was also another accident just prior to the disbanding of the 278th according to James Slone: Lt Jerry Ilich was killed when he was hit by Lt. Gustafson's airplane of the 25th Pursuit Squadron."

=== Third Army of Occupation ===
The squadron remained at Croix de Metz Aerodrome (with Second Army Air Services from 14 November) until being assigned to Sinzig Airdrome, Germany on 15 April 1919 to serve as part of the occupation force of the Rhineland under the Third Army Air Service, III Corps Observation Group.

There, the squadron began a series of photo-reconnaissance flights in the occupied Rhineland of major manufacturing centers, important cities and towns in both Occupied Germany as well as Luxembourg. Lines of communication (railroads, rivers and roads) were carefully mapped and photographed. In addition, squadron was able to perform test flights on surrendered German aircraft. Flights of the Fokker D.VII, Pfalz D.XII, Halberstadts and Rumpler aircraft were made and evaluations were made.

=== Demobilization ===
On 18 May 1919 orders were received from Third Army for the squadron to report to the 1st Air Depot, Colombey-les-Belles Airdrome to turn in all of its supplies and equipment and was relieved from duty with the AEF. The squadron's DH-4 aircraft were delivered to the Air Service Production Center No. 2. at Romorantin Aerodrome, and there, practically all of the pilots and observers were detached from the squadron.

Personnel at Colombey were subsequently assigned to the commanding general, services of supply, and ordered to report to one of several staging camps in France. There, personnel awaited scheduling to report to one of the base ports in France for transport to the United States and subsequent demobilization. The 278th Aero Squadron was demobilized at Mitchell Field, New York on 13 June 1919.

=== Lineage ===
- Organized as 278th Aero Squadron on 14 February 1918.

Re-designated: 278th Aero Squadron (Corps Observation), on 1 October 1918
Demobilized on 13 June 1919

=== Assignments ===
- Post Headquarters, Love Field, 14 February 1918
- Aviation Concentration Center, 8 July 1918
- Headquarters, Chief of Air Service, AEF, 27 August 1918
- Air Service Replacement Concentration Center, AEF, 2 September 1918
- 1st Air Depot, 11 September 1919
- VII Corps Observation Group, 29 October 1918
- Second Army Air Service, 14 November 1918
- IV Corps Observation Group, 15 April 1919
- 1st Air Depot, 18 May 1919
- Commanding General, Services of Supply, May 1919
- Post Headquarters, Mitchel Field, June 1919

=== Stations ===
- Love Field, Texas, 14 February 1918
- Aviation Concentration Center, Garden City, New York, 8 July 1918
- Port of Entry, Hoboken, New Jersey, 17 August 1918

Overseas transport: USS Von Steuben, 18–27 August 1918

- Pontanezen Barracks, Brest, France, 27 August 1918
- St. Maixent Replacement Barracks, France, 4 September 1918
- Colombey-les-Belles Airdrome, France, 11 September 1918
- Autreville Airdrome, France, 1 October 1918
- Croix de Metz Aerodrome, Toul, France, 10 November 1918
- Sinzig Airdrome, Germany, 15 April 1919
- Colombey-les-Belles Airdrome, France, 18 May 1919
- France, May–June 1919
- Mitchel Field, New York, 13 June 1919

=== Enemy aircraft flown for evaluation ===
- Evaluated Fokker D.VII, Pfalz D.XII, Halberstadt and Rumpler aircraft, 1919

== See also ==
- Organization of the Air Service of the American Expeditionary Force
- List of American aero squadrons
