= Trier Air Base =

Historical German military airfield

Trier Air Base Advanced Landing Ground Y-57
- Located Near Trier, Germany
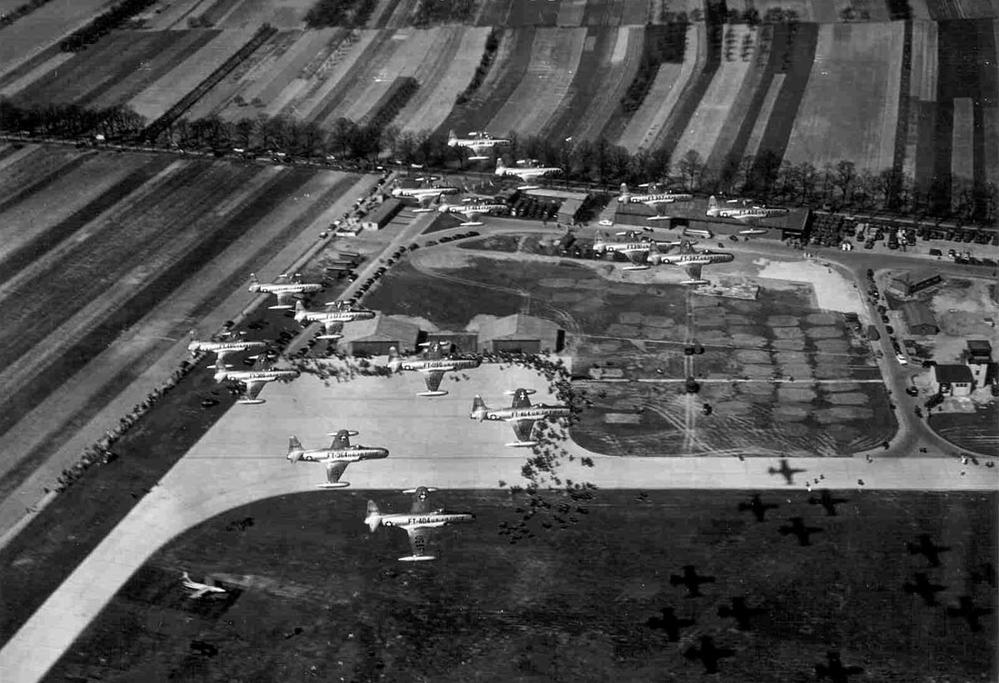
- RF-80 Shooting Stars of the 10th Tactical Reconnaissance Wing over Trier Air Base, 1955.

Site information
- Type: Military Airfield
- Controlled by: Deutsche Luftstreitkräfte, 1914-1918 Air Service, United States Army, 1918-1919; Deutsche Luftwaffe, 1936-1945; United States Army Air Forces, 1945 North Atlantic Treaty Organization (NATO), 1949-1977

Location
- Coordinates: 49°43′26″N 006°36′10″E

Site history
- In use: 1910–1977
- Battles/wars: Western Front (World War I); World War II

Trier Air Base, also known as Trier Euren Airfield, is a former military airfield located in the southwest of Trier, a city in Rhineland-Palatinate, Germany. It was established in 1910. During World War I it was used by the Deutsche Luftstreitkräfte as both a Zeppelin and military airfield. Later, it was used by the Air Service, United States Army, Deutsche Luftwaffe, the United States Army Air Forces, and NATO forces until being closed in 1977, when the airfield was converted into an industrial park.

== History ==
The history of Trier Air Base begins in 1910, when the Berliner Aeroclub held an air race between Trier and Metz. It was the first long range distance, and the first aviation undertaking in the southwest of Germany. It was then unused until 1913 when the German Imperial Army (Deutsches Heer) held maneuvers on the site, accompanied by an airplane. Afterwards, it became an intermediate airfield for Zeppelin airships based in Cologne. To facilitate this a large airship hangar was built at the field.

=== World War I ===
During the war, it was used as a Zeppelin Airbase. A Zeppelin from Trier bombed Paris on 21 March 1915. In addition to the Zeppelins, several combat aircraft squadrons of the Luftstreitkräfte (Imperial German Army Air Service) were stationed at Trier Airdrome.

=== United States Third Army ===
After the 1918 Armistice with Germany, the airfield was designated as an occupation area for the United States Third Army Air Service and many German aircraft were surrendered to the Americans there.

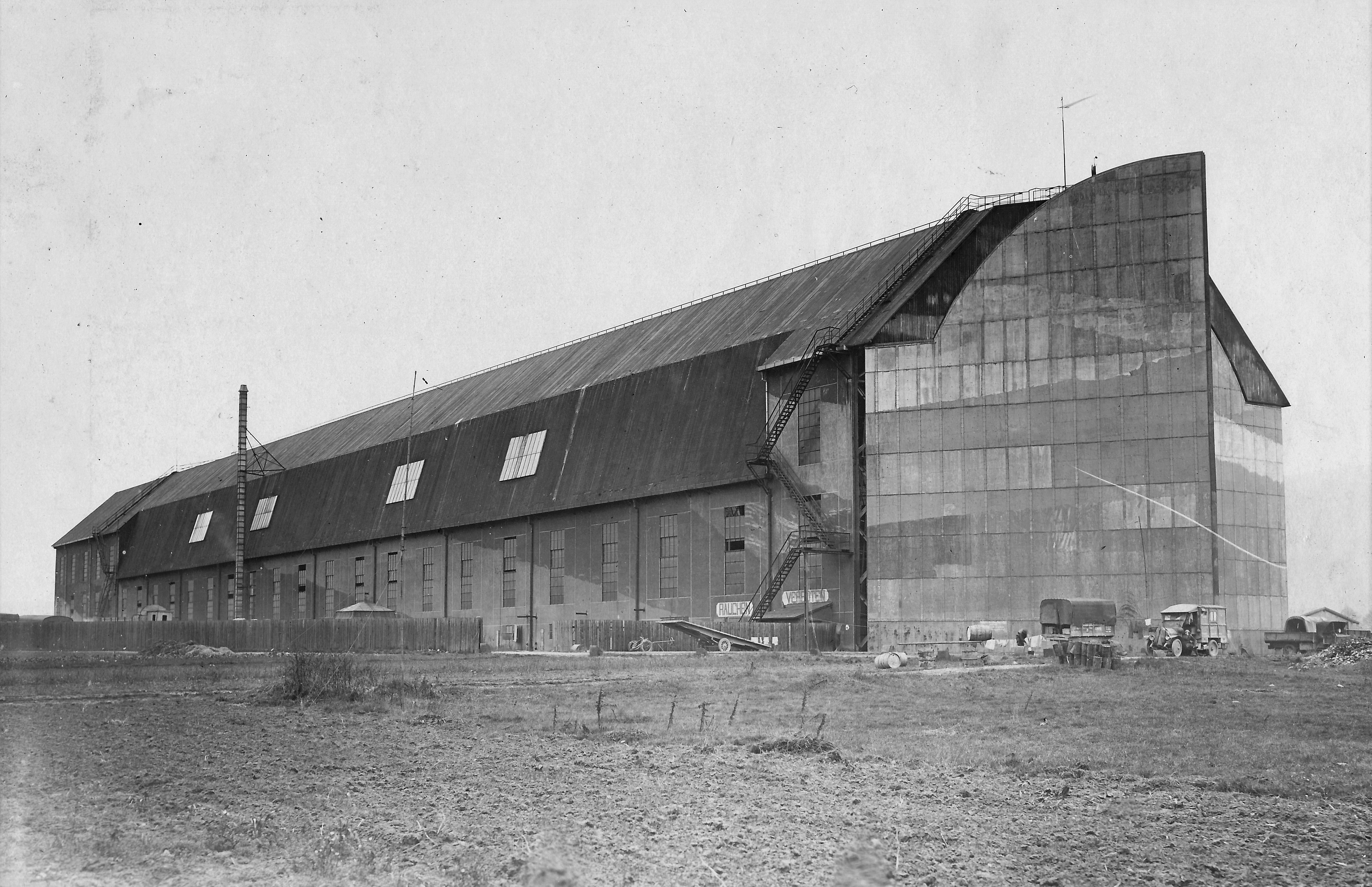
The airship hangar in 1919.

Initially, the Third Army Ait Service VII Corps Observation Group was assigned to the field. Assigned to it were the 12th and 88th Aero Squadrons (Corps Observation). Its mission it was to map the Rhineland area using aerial photography and perform test flights on surrendered German aircraft. Flights of the Fokker D.VII, Pfalz D.XII, Halberstadts and Rumpler aircraft were made and evaluations were provided.

Temporarily, Trier Airfield was the home of Headquarters of Third Army Air Service, which arrived on 8 December 1918. Assigned to it were the 9th, 91st, 94th and 166th Aero Squadrons. Its stay at Trier was brief, as it moved to Coblenz Airdrome, Fort Kaiser Alexander, once facilities in Coblenz were prepared.

Other Air Service squadrons at Trier were the 9th and 186th Aero Squadrons, which arrived on 15 April 1919 after the US First and Second Armies in France were demobilized. The American use of Trier Airfield ended on 12 May 1919 when Headquarters, Third Army ordered all Air Service units in the Rhineland to move back to France for demobilization.

=== Luftwaffe use in World War II ===
When the Americans left, the airfield was used by French troops, and German civilian aircraft were not allowed to use it until 1927. In 1935, in violation of the Treaty of Versailles, the Luftwaffe was brought into existence. The airfield was reopened by the Nazi Government, but due to its close proximity to the French border, the airfield was used for light non-military aircraft. In 1938 or 1939, some reserve units of the Luftwaffe were briefly stationed at the airfield, but no combat units were assigned.

When World War II broke out with France on 3 September 1939, Trier Airfield was placed on alert, but no Luftwaffe aircraft were assigned until May 1940, during the buildup of German forces prior to the Battle of France. The following known units were assigned to the airfield in May:

- Jagdgeschwader 53 (JG 53), Messerschmitt Bf 109E
- Jagdgeschwader 52 (JG 52), Messerschmitt Bf 109E
- Lehrgeschwader 1 (LG 1), Messerschmitt Bf 110C/D
- Zerstörergeschwader 1 (ZG 1), Messerschmitt Bf 110C/D
- Zerstörergeschwader 76 (ZG 76), Messerschmitt Bf 110C/D
- Kampfgeschwader 2 (KG 2), Dornier Do 17Z

All of these units took part in the ensuring combat in France during May and June 1940, and moving west into France. By mid-July, all of the combat units had moved out, and Trier airfield was unused for several years.

=== Advanced Landing Ground Y-57 ===
As Allied forces moved east from France in late 1944, the airfield was attacked on several occasions by Ninth Air Force Martin B-26 Marauder medium bombers and Republic P-47 Thunderbolts to deny the Luftwaffe use of the facility while the ground forces moved into Germany, crossing the Siegfried Line. The Trier area was the scene of heavy combat between the German Forces and Allies and they pushed east into the Rhineland as part of the Western Allied invasion of Germany. The following attacks on the airfield are recorded:

- 5 April 1944: low-level attack by P-47 Thunderbolts of the VIII Fighter Command – claims were one DFS 230 and one Gotha Go 242 destroyed; one Junkers Ju 188, one DFS 230 and five Go 242 damaged.
- 24 April 1944: low-level attack by VIII Fighter Command P-47s – claims were one Bf 110 destroyed; one damaged.
- 28 August 1944: low-level attack by VIII Fighter Command North American P-51 Mustangs – claims were two Junkers Ju 52 destroyed; one Focke-Wulf Fw 190 and one Ju 52 damaged. Following the shelling of Trier by U.S. artillery, the evacuation and demolition of the airfield was ordered on 16 September 1944. It was ordered to be made serviceable again on 20 December 1944.
- 13 January 1945: strafed by VIII Fighter Command P-51s.

Finally on 2 March 1945, the American Third Army captured the airfield. Combat engineers from IX Engineer command moved in with the 825th Engineering Aviation Battalion arriving on 6 March 1945 to repair the damaged airfield. Pierced Steel Planking was laid down over the damaged concrete runway, making it usable for American combat aircraft. In addition, the engineers began clearing the airport of mines and destroyed Luftwaffe aircraft, and repairing operational facilities for use by American aircraft. On 10 March the airfield was declared ready for Allied use and was designated as Advanced Landing Ground "Y-57 Trier-Euren". Trier Airfield was the first operational American airfield in occupied Germany.

Trier Airfield's primary use by the Americans was for combat resupply and casualty evacuation, being used largely by C-47 Skytrain transports from the day it was opened until the end of the war in May. It was also used by the Ninth Air Force 10th Reconnaissance Group until early April, flying photo-reconnaissance missions with Lockheed P-38 Lightnings (F-4) and North American P-51 Mustangs (F-5). On 26 March 1945, a Douglas A-26C-20-DT Invader (s/n 43-22503) of the 670th Bombardment Squadron, 416th Bombardment Group crash-landed near the runway after being hit in the right engine during a raid against Altenkirchen. With the end of the war, Trier Airfield was closed on 10 July 1945.

=== Postwar/NATO use ===
When the USAAF closed the airfield in July 1945, occupation forces from the United States Army moved in to garrison the facility. The airfield became a Displaced Persons camp during 1945 and early 1946, holding civilians from many countries of Europe as the continent slowly recovered from the ravages of war.

United States Army forces moved out of Trier in the late summer of 1945, as French forces moved into the Rhineland as part of their occupation zone of Germany. With the establishment of NATO in 1949, Headquarters, Fourth Allied Tactical Air Force (4 ATAF) was established at what became "Trier Air Base" about 1950. The wartime damaged airfield was repaired as part of the postwar reconstruction, and new buildings for the NATO facility were erected at the base. The NATO facility closed on 30 November 1957 after 4 ATAF was moved to Ramstein Air Base to consolidate command facilities with the USAF. Once NATO left the base, it was used as a civil airport for the city of Trier. In the early 1970s it became clear the airfield would have to close to allow industrial development. Construction of Trier-Föhren Airport as a replacement airfield for the city of Trier began.

A French army helicopter unit remained at the airport until 1977, when it was closed and converted into an industrial park. The original 4 ATAF buildings north of the airfield had been handed over the West German Air Force in 1957 and were used until 2009. After being used as a refugee camp in 2014–2018, the city of Trier decided to buy the former barracks and redevelop the area into an industrial park. Although the last aviation use of the Trier Air Base airfield ended in 1977, it is still recognizable, both from the air and on the ground. The runway and taxiways are largely intact and have been converted into streets and parking for large trucks. Two buildings of the airfield remained on the west side of the former airfield until 2019, although more and more of the runway is being removed and redeveloped.

== See also ==
- Advanced Landing Ground
