= 186th Aero Squadron =

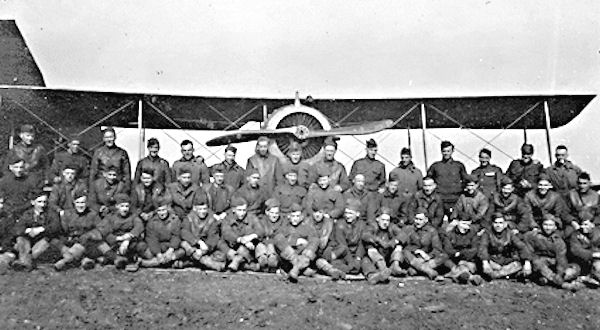
- 186th Aero Squadron
- Active: 16 November 1917 – July 1919
- Country: United States
- Branch: United States Army Air Service
- Type: Squadron
- Role: Observation
- Part of: American Expeditionary Forces (AEF)
- Engagements: World War I Occupation of the Rhineland

Commanders
- Notable commanders: Capt. John C. Kennedy

Insignia
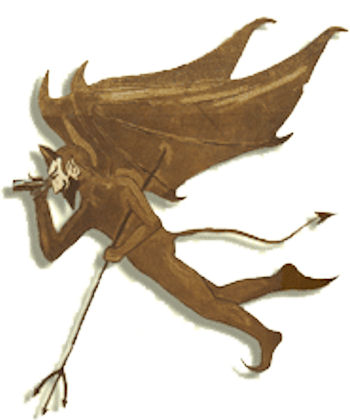
- 186th Aero Squadron Emblem

Aircraft flown
- Reconnaissance: Salmson 2A2 1918–1919
- Trainer: Curtiss JN-4, 1917

Service record
- Operations: First Army Observation Group; Western Front, France: 25 October-11 November 1918: Sorties: 7; Combat missions: 3; No combat losses or victories

The 186th Aero Squadron was a United States Army Air Service unit that fought on the Western Front during World War I.

The squadron was assigned as an Army Observation Squadron, performing long-range, strategic reconnaissance over the entire length of the United States First Army sector of the Western Front in France. After the 1918 Armistice with Germany, the squadron was assigned to the United States Third Army, VII Corps Observation Group at Trier Airfield, Germany as part of the Allied Occupation of the Rhineland.

The squadron was demobilized in Germany during July 1919 and its members returned to the United States. There is no modern United States Air Force unit that shares its lineage and history.

== History ==
=== Origins ===
The squadron was formed at Kelly Field, Texas, on or about 16 November 1917. It consisted of forty men transferred from the 25th Aero Squadron and 110 previously unassigned recruits from Kelly Field No. #1. The first official duty of the 186th was operation at the flying school where it was organized. From November 1917 to 20 January 1918 the 186th operated at the flying school there at Kelly Field, flying Curtiss JN-4 trainers and learning the basics of flying. With its initial training completed, the squadron was ordered on 20 January to proceed to the Aviation Concentration Center, Camp Mills, Garden City, New York, from which it would proceed overseas for duty.

The transportation of the squadron from Kelly Field to Camp Mills was accomplished with some good humor, much complaining, a few drunks, a minor accident or two, a few stray kisses administered to the men from patriotic American girls who desired to help make the world "free for democracy", but there were no casualties. The train jumped the track at Basile, Louisiana, which gave the men a chance to sample some good Southern liquor. One man was placed under arrest for disorderly conduct. At Washington, D.C., the Red Cross ladies served sandwiches and coffee, but no liquor. No arrests were made.

The 186th arrived at Aviation Concentration and Supply Camp No. 2, about two miles from Hempstead, New York, on 24 January 1918. At this point most of the troops went A.W.O.L. to visit relatives and others, principally others. After five days through the worst weather that Long Island is capable of, the 186th embarked on the White Star Line RMS Adriatic. At Halifax, Nova Scotia, the Adriatic waited for three days for a convoy, prior to the trans-Atlantic crossing. The northern climate froze you stiff. The squadron was inspected on the deck with the thermometer at sixteen below zero. Three enlisted men were taken from the ship here on account of mumps. The voyage across the Atlantic lasted sixteen days. Many were seasick and therefore had no fear of submarines. A seasick man had one advantage over the rest; a submarine would relieve his misery. The 186th won the majority of prizes in the boxing contests of the Adriatic, Kid Dayton starred.

=== Training in England ===
The 186th arrived at Liverpool, England on 16 February 1918 where three men were admitted to the hospital, two for measles and the other for suspected meningitis. They left Liverpool the same date, proceeding to Rest Camp Woodley, Romsey, near Winchester, arriving late that night. The squadron stayed at Romsey ten days under quarantine during which time all flying and medical personnel were transferred out. The squadron was split here into four flights and sent to different posts in England for additional training prior to being sent into combat in France. The division was as follows: "A" Flight to RFC Lilbourne, near Rugby; "B" Flight to RFC Castle Bromwich, Birmingham, and "C" and "D" Flights to RFC Rendcombe, near Cirencester. All flights were placed under the instruction of the Royal Flying Corps (RFC).

On 5 April 1918, "A" Flight was transferred to RFC Port Meadow, Oxford, and "B" Flight to RFC Rendcombe. During "B" Flights stay in Castle Bromwich, mumps developed and the entire flight was placed under quarantine for three weeks during which time they were put to work on a farm. This flight participated in the Allied parade in the city of Birmingham which was given in the honor of the Red Cross. The flights at Rendcombe went to Cheltenham, on 4 July and were entertained by the citizens of the city. There was a baseball game between the 186th and the 199th Aero Squadron, both of which were guests of the town.

While the squadron was in England they received instruction with different types of English planes, some of which are as follows: Bristol F.2 Fighters, Royal Aircraft Factory B.E.2Es, Avro 504s, D.H. 6's, R.E. 8's. Sopwith Camels, Sopwith Pups and Royal Aircraft Factory S.E.5s. This instruction was all practical; the men worked on the planes and were made responsible for their upkeep and efficiency.

=== Arrival in France ===
After six months training in England, on 17 August 1918 the squadron was re-assembled in Winchester, where they were equipped for duty in France. The 186th started for Southampton on 23 August 1918 where they went into camp awaiting transportation across the Channel. Embarked on board the S.S. Yale on 27 August, the cross-channel journey was made and the squadron disembarked at Le Havre, France the next morning. The squadron left Le Havre the next morning in French box cars fittingly called by the men "side door Pullmans". Their destination was unknown to them. After two-day and three nights they arrived at the St. Maixent Aerodrome, which was the processing base for new American units arriving in France. On 7 September the squadron were again loaded in the boxcars and arrived at Air Service Production Center No. 2, Romorantin Aerodrome, after two days of monotonous riding. After one week at Romoratin the 186th was again loaded into the famous side door Pullmans en route to the 1st Air Depot at Colombey-les-Belles Airdrome, arriving on 17 September for equipment issue. It then proceeded to the Autreville Aerodrome from there in trucks.

It was expected that the squadron's stay at Autreville would be no longer than the time necessary to draw supplies and get filled up with pilots and observers. At the time it was realized that a shortage of pilots and observers existed but it was never thought that it would take six weeks to get them ten of each. There were at this time about six squadrons in the neighborhood of Colombey-les-Belles waiting for their flyers. While here ships were drawn, which consisted of eighteen Salmson 2A2s, supposedly the last word in French observation airplanes. They were equipped with radio and guns, etc., and as far as the airplanes went the squadron was ready for work on the front about 1 October 1918, but as to flying personnel there was only one complete team assigned, one pilot and one observer. At this place all supplies were drawn, including radio equipment, armament, spare parts, etc., but as to transportation it was not thought necessary. One truck was placed at the disposal of the squadron for about six hours a day to draw all the material from Colombey-les Belles. Since all of the radio equipment was new and untried many radio tests from the air were made at Autreville and others were made later.

=== Combat operations ===
On 27 October 1918 the squadron was assigned to the First Army Observation Group and moved on the 29th, to Souilly Aerodrome for combat operations. All supplies, personnel, and equipment were transported the same day. The planes were transported by air. At Souilly one truck was all the transportation in the possession of the squadron. This one truck was used to draw rations, for aerial field service, for transportation of personnel to and from town, for hauling water, for all transportation of supplies and for hauling fuel.

The 186th participated in the operation of the two Argonne-Meuse offensives. The first trip over the lines were made 5 November 1918, by 2d Lt. Donald B. Phillips, pilot and 2d Lt. John B. Holmberg, observer. This plane furnished protection for a plane of the 88th Aerp Squadron which was on the same aerodrome with the 186th and was glad to cooperate in permitting our fliers to acquire experience over the lines in company with their old experienced skippers.

The squadron was held up in starting work over the lines because they were the first American squadron assigned to the long distance reglage work, (flying to strict map coordinates). This was new to them, and it was necessary to make considerable liaisons to the French squadrons that knew how this work should be done. There were also difficulties in the coordination with the infantry units the squadron was programmed to support, with the rapid advance of the units. On 6 November, the 186th moved again, to the nearby Lemmes Aerodrome.

On 8 November, 2d Lt. Fred C. Griffith, pilot and 2d Lt. Kenneth F. Potter, Observer, furnished protection for contact patrol northwest of Verdun. On 10 November a reconnaissance of German territory within the triangle of towns of Stenay, Montmedy and Olizy was made by 1st Lt. Clarence M. Smith, pilot and 1st Lt. Sidney S. Stocking, observer, and considerable valuable information was brought back but the ending of the war the following day impaired a great deal undoubtedly the value of that information. By the Armistice on 11 November the squadron had suffered no casualties nor had they received confirmation of any victories.

=== Third Army of occupation ===
As far as the squadron were concerned, the armistice was signed on 16 November for on that night an entire hangar was set aside for a party which included every enlisted man and every officer in the squadron. There were numerous speeches and songs not to mention a twenty-piece band from Rampont. This party lasted into the wee hours of the morning and everyone "did his bit", and it is hard to tell even to this day which was the utmost in the minds of the jolly squadron that night, the signing of the armistice or a celebration of the anniversary of the organization of the 186th Aero Squadron.

The squadron was back at Souilly Aerodrome on 24 November, and remained there until 15 April 1919 when the First Army Observation Group was demobilized, and the squadron was reassigned to Trier Airdrome, Germany to serve as part of the occupation force of the Rhineland under the Third Army Air Service, VII Corps Observation Group. At Trier, the squadron was able to perform test flights on surrendered German aircraft. Flights of the Fokker D.VII, Pfalz D.XII, Halberstadts and Rumpler aircraft were made and evaluations were made.

=== Demobilization ===
On 12 May 1919, orders were received from Third Army for the squadron to demobilize. It was ordered to report to the 1st Air Depot at Colombey-les-Belles Airdrome, to turn in all of its supplies and equipment and was relieved from duty with the AEF. The squadron's Salmson aircraft were delivered to the Air Service American Air Service Acceptance Park No. 1 at Orly Aerodrome to be returned to the French. There practically all of the pilots and observers were detached from the squadron. One of the personnel assigned to squadron in May 1919 was Donald Wilson.

Personnel at Colombey were subsequently assigned to the commanding general, services of supply, and ordered to report to one of several staging camps in France. There, personnel awaited scheduling to report to one of the base ports in France for transport to the United States and subsequent demobilization. The 186th Aero Squadron returned from Europe in June and was demobilized at Mitchel Field, New York.

=== Lineage ===
- Organized as 186th Aero Squadron on 16 November 1917

Re-designated: 186th Aero Squadron (Army Observation), 27 October 1918
Demobilized on 30 June 1919

=== Assignments ===
- Post Headquarters, Kelly Field, 16 November 1917 – 20 January 1918
- Aviation Concentration Center, 24 January 1918
- Air Service Headquarters, AEF, British Isles, 16 February 1918

Attached to Royal Flying Corps for training, 16 February-17 August 1918

- Replacement Concentration Center, AEF, 29 August-17 September 1918
- 1st Air Depot, 17–18 September 1918
- First Army Observation Group, 27 October 1918
- VII Corps Observation Group, 15 April 1919
- 1st Air Depot, 12 May 1919
- Commanding General, Services of Supply, May 1919
- Post Headquarters, Mitchel Field, June 1919

=== Stations ===
- Kelly Field, Texas, 16 November 1917 – 20 January 1918
- Aviation Concentration Center, Garden City, New York, 24–29 January 1918
- Port of Entry, Hoboken, New Jersey,

Overseas transport, RMS Adriatic, 29 January-16 February 1918

- Romney Rest Camp, Winchester, England, 16 February 1918

A Flight, RFC Lilbourne, England, 26 February 1918

RFC Port Meadow, England, 5 April 1918

B Flight, RFC Castle Bromwich, England, 26 February 1918

RFC Rendcomb, England, 5 April 1918

C & D Flight, RFC Rendcomb, England, 26 February 1918

- Winchester, England, 17 August 1918
- St. Maixent Replacement Barracks, France, 1 September 1918
- Colombey-les-Belles Airdrome, 17 September 1918
- Autreville Aerodrome, 18 September 1918
- Souilly Aerodrome, 29 October 1918
- Lemmes Aerodrome, 7 November 1918
- Souilly Aerodrome, 24 November 1918
- Trier Airdrome, Germany, 15 April 1919
- Colombey-les-Belles Airdrome, 12 May 1919
- France, May–June 1919
- Mitchel Field, New York, June 1919

=== Enemy aircraft flown for evaluation ===
- Evaluated Fokker D.VII, Pfalz D.XII, Halberstadt and Rumpler aircraft, 1919

=== Combat sectors and campaigns ===
Streamer	Sector/Campaign	Dates	Notes
	Meuse-Argonne Offensive Campaign	26 September-11 November 1918	

== See also ==
- Organization of the Air Service of the American Expeditionary Force
- List of American aero squadrons
