= Organization of the Air Service of the American Expeditionary Force =

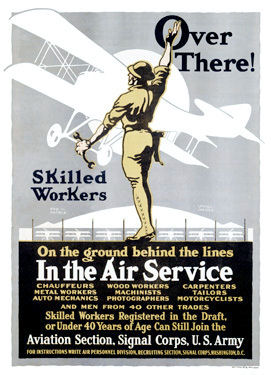
- World War I Air Service recruiting poster, 1918
- Active: 3 September 1917 - 1919
- Country: United States
- Branch: United States Army Air Service
- Part of: American Expeditionary Forces

Commanders
- Chief of Air Service, American Expeditionary Forces, 3 September 1917: William L. Kenly
- Chief of Air Service, American Expeditionary Forces, 27 November 1917: Benjamin Foulois
- Chief of Air Service, American Expeditionary Forces, 19 May 1918: Mason Patrick

Insignia
- Wing roundel of Air Service, United States Army aircraft

The Organization of the Air Service of the American Expeditionary Force on 11 November 1918, represents its maximum strength in World War I. Units of the Air Service are listed as assigned to the order of battle for that date, which was that of the Armistice with Germany. The first air unit arrived in France in September 1917, while the final air unit reaching the front did so on 9 November 1918. Unit operations began in April 1918. At the armistice, 57,508 officers and men served in the Air Service of the AEF, 24,512 in the Zone of Advance (combat area), and 32,996 in the Services of Supply (rear areas). Of its 6,861 officers, 4,088 were on flying status and 219 were qualified observation balloon aviators. 1,724 of those on flying status and approximately 100 of the balloonists served in combat units.

The First Army Air Service was activated 26 August 1918, with Col. Benjamin Foulois named chief over Col. Billy Mitchell. The Second Army Air Service was activated on 12 October with Col. Frank P. Lahm as chief, and the Third Army Air Service was created immediately after the armistice to provide aviation support to the army of occupation, primarily from veteran units transferred from the First Army Air Service.

The first two air combat groups formed in the AEF were the 1st Corps Observation Group, in April 1918, and the 1st Pursuit Group at Toul. Ultimately fourteen airplane and seven balloon groups were formed to support the operations of two field armies and five corps. The five pursuit and two bombardment groups were organized into two wings. The seven observation and seven balloon groups had one of each assigned to an army or corps air service. Two flexible "observation wings" were created to coordinate the reconnaissance activities of the five corps air services.

The basic units of the air service were the squadron for powered aircraft and the company for balloons. 45 squadrons (38 of which conducted combat operations) of aircraft and 17 companies of balloons served at the front. The 20 pursuit and seven bombardment squadrons were authorized 25 aircraft (including spares) and 18 crews each by the Field Service Regulations, while the 18 observation squadrons were each authorized 24 planes and 18 crews. Balloon companies were equipped with one balloon and approximately six observers each.

== Air Service of the American Expeditionary Force (AEF) ==
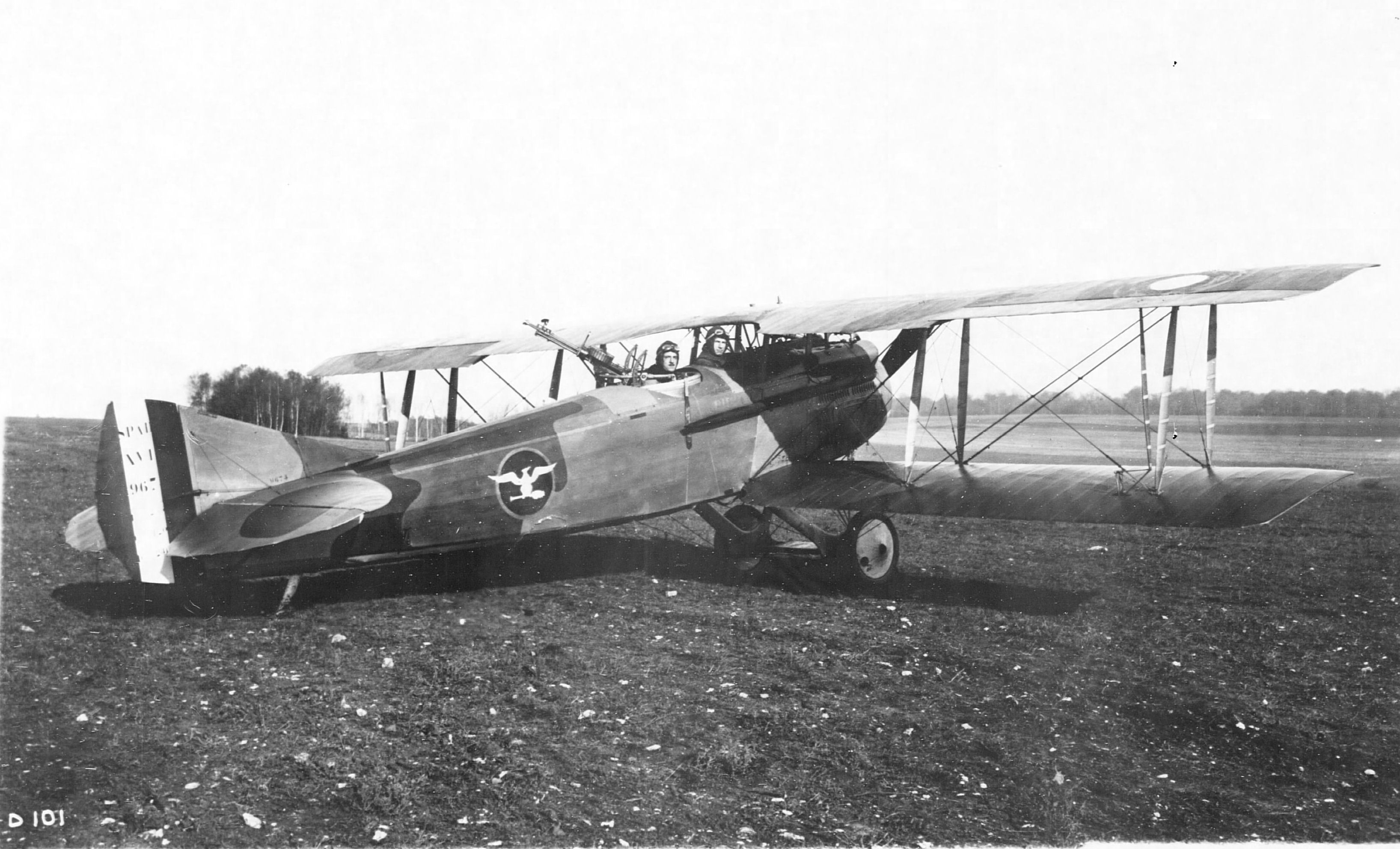
General William Mitchell's personal Spad XVI

- Headquarters Air Service, Zone of Advance

Headquarters, Chief of Air Service, AEF (Chaumont Hill 402 Aerodrome).

Major General Mason M. Patrick

Headquarters, Chief of Air Service, Group of Armies (Ligny-en-Barrois)

Brigadier General William L. "Billy" Mitchell

=== First Army Air Service ===
The First Army Air Service was the largest and most diverse Air Service combat organization of the American Expeditionary Forces in France, and most American Air Service combat units were assigned to it when assigned to the front. The First Army Air Service dates to the first American Air Service personnel arriving in France. On 15 January 1918, Colonel William Mitchell was appointed Chief of the Air Service, I Corps, First Army. At this time, the I Corps was being formed for the purpose of administratively handling all of the American troops then on the Western Front. Headquarters was located at Neufchâteau, France. When the first American Aero Squadrons arrived at the front in April 1918, they were assigned to the quiet Toul Sector. At this time, the American Air Service on the front consisted of only a few Aero Squadrons of the 1st Pursuit Group.

Created on 10 August at La Ferté-sous-Jouarre, the unit was formally organized on next 26 August at Ligny-en-Barrois, France. It consisted of the French Aerial Division, which consisted of a large number of pursuit and day bombardment squadrons. In addition, there was one other French pursuit group and three American pursuit groups-one American day-bombardment group-the 1st Army observation, and one French Army artillery group for the adjustment of long-range artillery fire. Eight night-bombardment squadrons of the British Royal Air Force. were to cooperate with the First Army Air Service whenever the tactical situation made such action expedient. The establishment of the First Army Air Service marked the first concentration of American air forces under its own commander.

On 11 November 1918, all offensive flying ended at 11:00 am in compliance with the Armistice with Germany. As part of the Armistice, Allied Forces were to occupy the Rhineland area of Germany beginning on 1 December. The Third Army Air Service was established to be the air component of the United States Third Army. Units from the First Army AS contributed to over half the strength of Third Army AS, consisting of eight Aero Squadrons, and the headquarters of the III Corps Observation Group, and the VII Corps Observation Group.

Headquarters was officially demobilized on 15 April 1919, its men arriving in the United States by the end of May and either transferred to Air Service units or returned to civilian life.

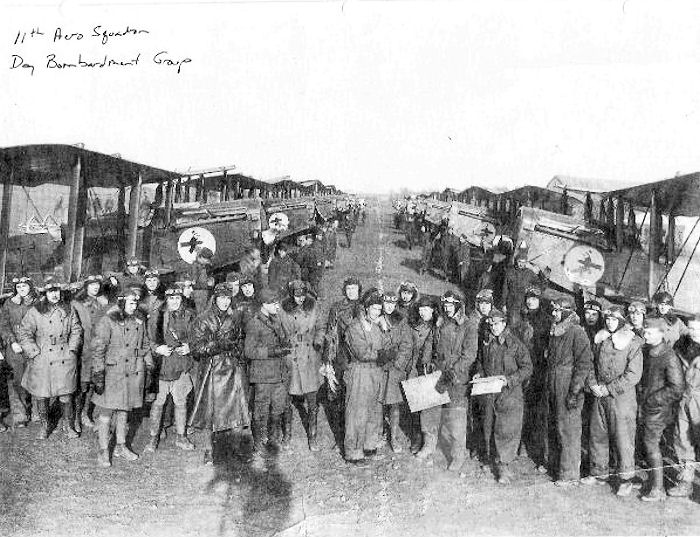
11th Aero Squadron posing with its De Havilland DH.4 Bombers (Note "Mr Jiggs" on each fuselage), Maulan Aerodrome

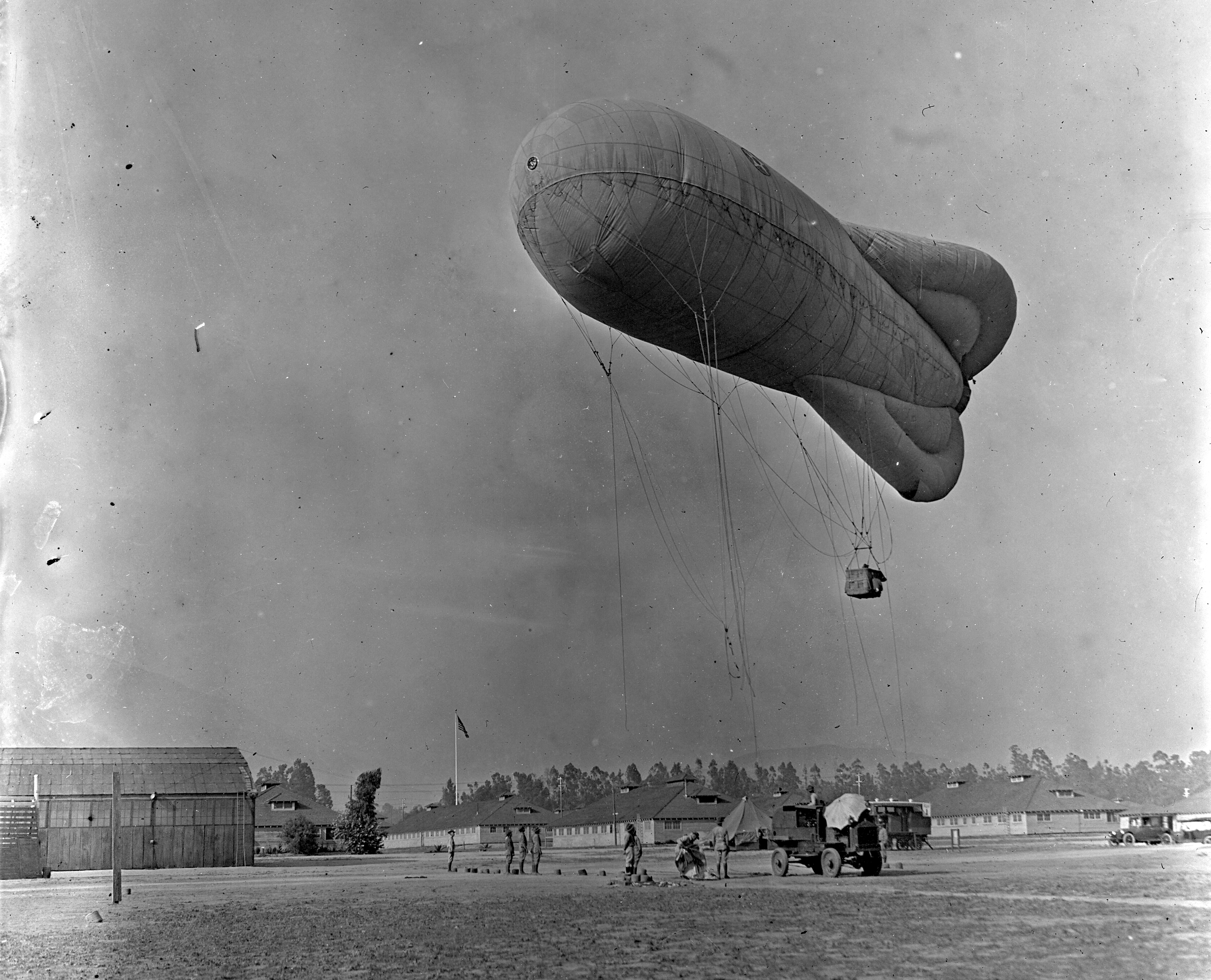
Caquot Type "R" kite balloon

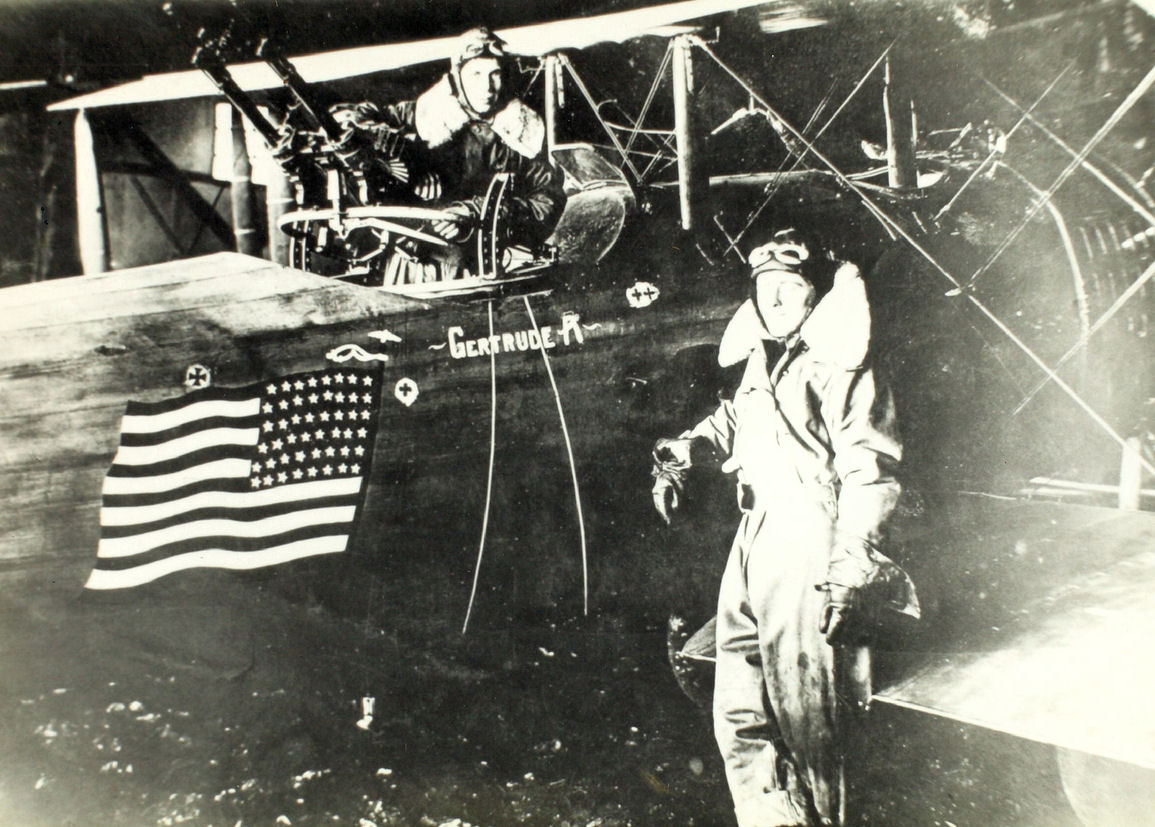
1st Aero Squadron Salmson 2.A2 reconnaissance aircraft, Remicourt Aerodrome

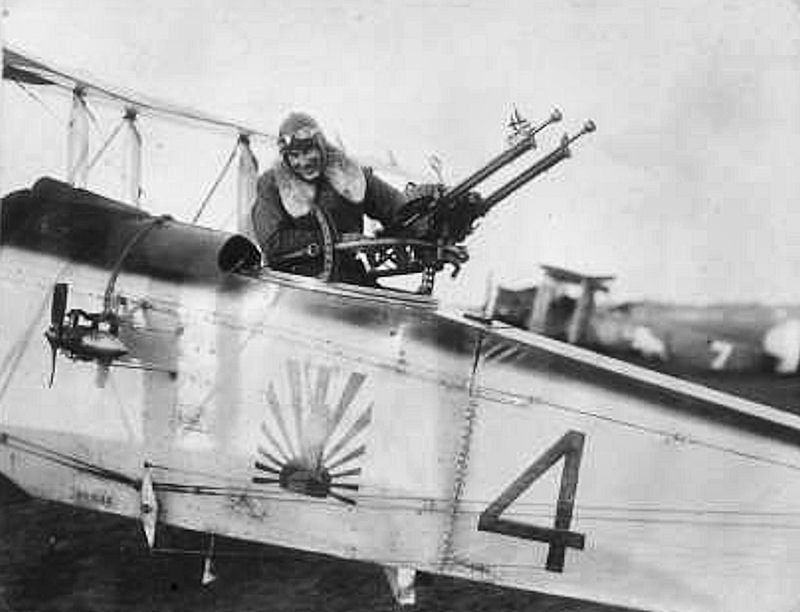
135th Aero Squadron De Havilland DH.4 No 4, Saizerais Aerodrome

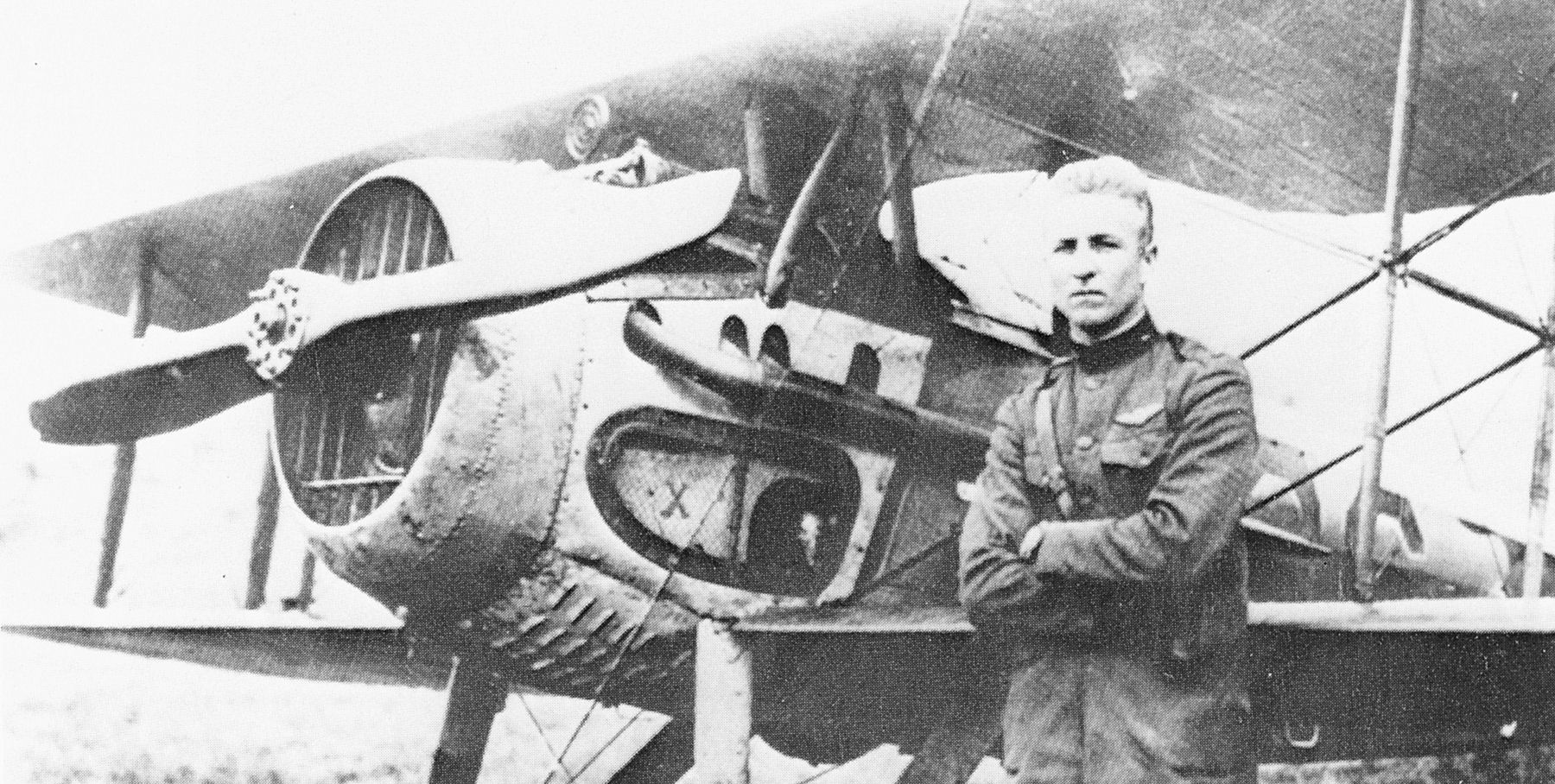
27th Aero Squadron - 2lt Frank Luke Jr with his SPAD XIII, Rembercourt Aerodrome

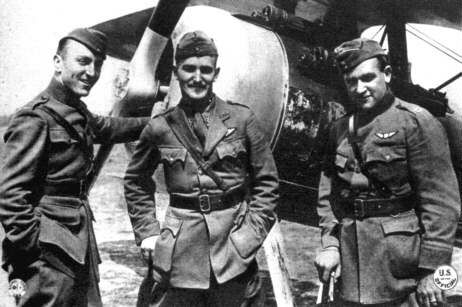
Eddie Rickenbacker, Douglas Campbell, and Kenneth Marr of the 94th Aero Squadron pose next to a Nieuport 28 fighter, 1918.

- HQ First Army Air Service, 10 August 1918 – 15 April 1919 (La Ferté-sous-Jouarre, then Ligny-en-Barrois 26 August, and Souilly Aerodrome 21 September)

Colonel Thomas D. Milling, Commander

  - First Day Bombardment Group 10 September 1918 – 17 December 1918 (Amanty Aerodrome, then 23 September to Maulan Aerodrome)

Major James L. Dunsworth, Commander

11th Aero Squadron (Day Bombardment) 10 September 1918 – 17 December 1918 (De Havilland DH.4)
20th Aero Squadron (Day Bombardment) 10 September 1918 – 17 December 1918 (De Havilland DH.4)
96th Aero Squadron (Day Bombardment) 10 September 1918 – 17 December 1918 (Breguet 14B.2)
166th Aero Squadron (Day Bombardment) 20 September 1918 – 21 November 1918 (De Havilland DH.4)

  - First Army Observation Group 6 September 1918 – 15 April 1919 (Vavincourt Aerodrome)

Captain Harry T. Wood, Commander

9th Aero Squadron (Night Observation) 26 Aug 1918 – 15 November 1918 (Breguet 14A.2)
24th Aero Squadron (Army Observation) 14 Aug 1918 – 15 April 1919 (Salmson 2.A2)
91st Aero Squadron (Army Observation) 7 May 1918 – 27 December 1918 (Salmson 2.A2)
186th Aero Squadron (Army Observation) 27 Oct 1918 – 10 April 1919 (Salmson 2.A2)

  - First Army Balloon Group

Major John Paegelow, Commander

11th Balloon Company (Fontaines)
43d Balloon Company (Fossé)

  - I Corps Observation Wing (Rampont)

Major Melvin Adams Hall, Commander

    - I Corps Observation Group 21 April 1918 – 15 April 1919 (HQ: see page)

1st Aero Squadron (Corps Observation) 21 April 1918 – 18 November 1918 (Salmson 2.A2)
12th Aero Squadron (Corps Observation) 30 April 1918 – 20 November 1918 (Salmson 2.A2)
88th Aero Squadron (Corps Observation) 28 May 1918 – 25 July 1918 (Salmson 2.A2)
50th Aero Squadron (Corps Observation) 8 September 1918 – 1 April 1919 (De Havilland DH.4)
90th Aero Squadron (Corps Observation) 15 November 1918 – 18 January 1919 (Salmson 2.A2)

    - I Corps Balloon Group (Chéhéry)

1st Balloon Company (Auzéville)
2d Balloon Company (Les Petites-Armoises)
5th Balloon Company (La Besace)

  - III Corps Observation Wing (Dun-sur-Meuse)

Major Joseph C. Morrow, Commander

    - III Corps Observation Group 20 September 1918 – 21 November 1918 (Souilly Aerodrome, 29 October 1918 to Bethelainville Aerodrome)

Captain Kenneth P. Littauer, Commander

88th Aero Squadron (Corps Observation) 24 May 1918 – 15 November 1918 (Salmson 2.A2)
90th Aero Squadron (Corps Observation) 11 June 1918 – 15 November 1918 (Salmson 2.A2)
1st Aero Squadron (Corps Observation) 18-21 November 1918 (Salmson 2.A2)

    - III Corps Balloon Group (Dun-sur-Meuse)

3d Balloon Company (Belrupt)
4th Balloon Company (Vilosnes-sur-Meuse)
9th Balloon Company (Consenvoye)
42d Balloon Company (Villers-devant-Dun)

  - IV Corps Observation Group 1 July-14 October 1918 (HQ: see page)

135th Aero Squadron (Corps Observation), 30 July 1918 – 14 October 1918 (De Havilland DH.4)
24th Aero Squadron (Corps Observation), 6-22 August 1918 (Salmson 2.A2)
8th Aero Squadron (Corps Observation), 31 August 1918 – 14 October 1918 (De Havilland DH.4)

  - V Corps Observation Wing (Nouart)

Major Martin F. Scanlon, Commander

    - V Corps Observation Group 1 September 1918 – 15 February 1919 (see page)

99th Aero Squadron (Corps Observation) 7 September 1918 – 15 February 1919 (Salmson 2.A2)
104th Aero Squadron (Corps Observation) 4 September 1918 – 14 January 1919 (Salmson 2.A2)
88th Aero Squadron (Corps Observation) attached 12-17 September 1918 (Salmson 2.A2)

    - V Corps Balloon Group (Nouart)

Captain Alvin C. Rois, Commander
6th Balloon Company (Brabant-sur-Meuse)
7th Balloon Company (Tailly)
8th Balloon Company (Nouart)
12th Balloon Company (Buzancy)

  - VII Corps Observation Group 7 August 1918 – 14 November 1918 (HQ: see page)

258th Aero Squadron (Corps Observation) 19 September 1918 – 7 November 1918 (Salmson 2.A2)
278th Aero Squadron (Corps Observation) 29 October 1918 – 14 November 1918 (De Havilland DH.4)

  - 1st Pursuit Wing 6 July 1918 – 17 December 1918 (HQ: see page)

Major Burt M. Atkinson, Commander
(from 5 May to 6 July, the three PG are directly under command on the First Army Air Service)

    - 1st Pursuit Group 5 May 1918 – 9 December 1918 (HQ: see page)

Major Harold E. Hartney, Commander

27th Aero Squadron (Pursuit) 2 June 1918 – 9 December 1918 (SPAD S.XIII)
94th Aero Squadron (Pursuit) 5 May 1918 – 20 November 1918 (SPAD S.XIII)
95th Aero Squadron (Pursuit) 5 May 1918 – 9 December 1918 (SPAD S.XIII)
147th Aero Squadron (Pursuit) 2 June 1918 – 9 December 1918 (SPAD S.XIII)
185th Aero Squadron (Night Pursuit) 5 October 1918 – 9 December 1918 (Sopwith Camel F.1)

    - 2d Pursuit Group 29 June 1918 – 11 December 1918 (see page)

Major Davenport Johnson, Commander

13th Aero Squadron (Pursuit) 28 June 1918 – 5 December 1918 (SPAD S.XIII)
22d Aero Squadron (Pursuit) 16 August 1918 – 11 December 1918 (SPAD S.XIII)
28th Aero Squadron (Pursuit) 6 November 1918 – 11 December 1918 (SPAD S.XIII)
49th Aero Squadron (Pursuit) 2 August 1918 – 5 December 1918 (SPAD S.XIII)
103rd Aero Squadron (Pursuit) 4 July 1918 – 7 August 1918 (SPAD S.XIII)
139th Aero Squadron (Pursuit) 30 June 1918 – 11 December 1918 (SPAD S.XIII)

    - 3d Pursuit Group 26 July 1918 – 31 December 1918 (see page)

Major William Thaw II, Commander

28th Aero Squadron (Pursuit) 22 August 1918 – 6 November 1918 (SPAD S.XIII)
49th Aero Squadron (Pursuit) 28 July 1918 – 2 August 1918 (SPAD S.XIII)
93d Aero Squadron (Pursuit) 26 July 1918 – 15 December 1918 (SPAD S.XIII)
103d Aero Squadron (Pursuit) 7 August 1918 – 31 December 1918 (SPAD S.XIII)
213th Aero Squadron (Pursuit) 26 July 1918 – 31 December 1918 (SPAD S.XIII)

=== Second Army Air Service ===
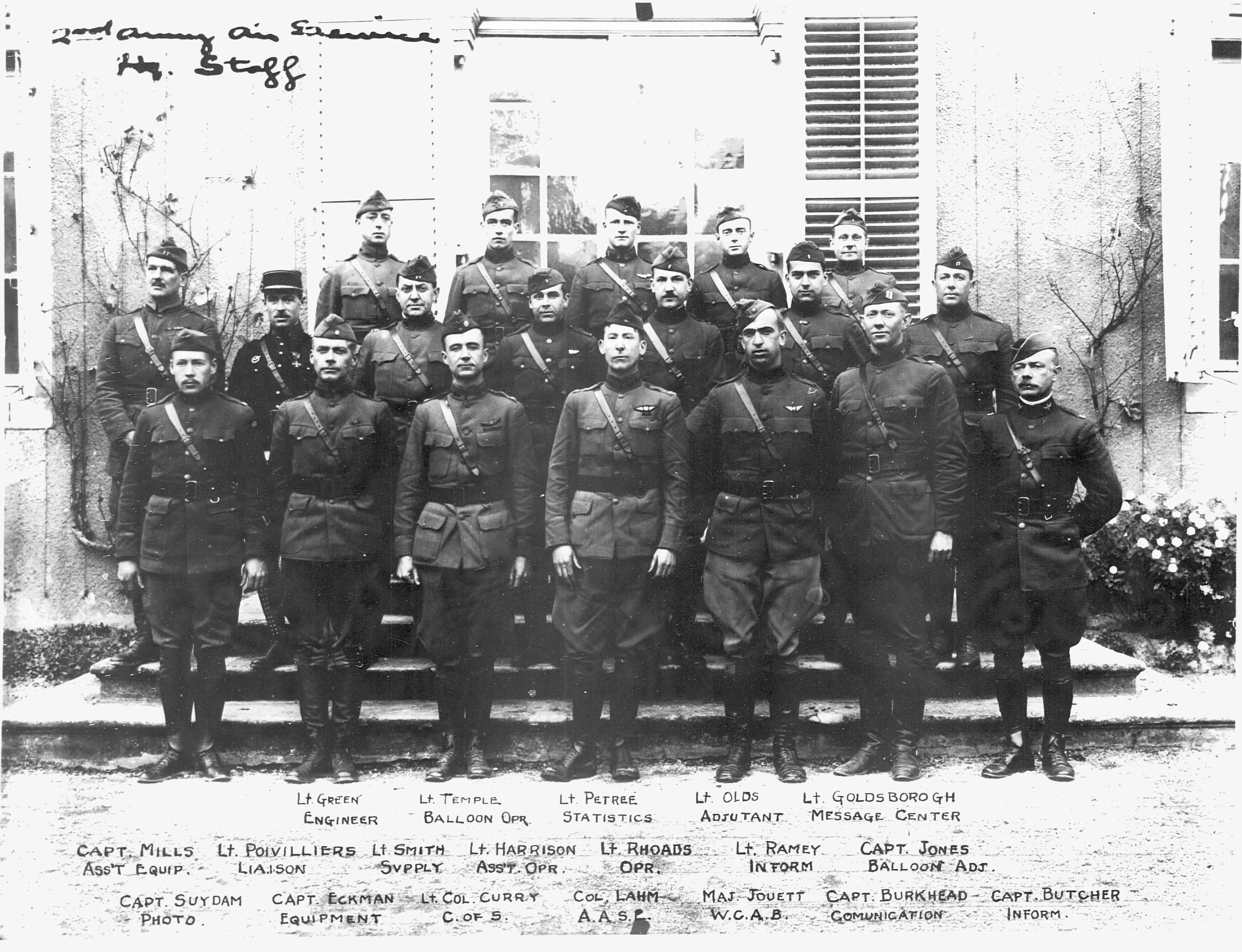
Headquarters staff, Second Army Air Service, Croix-de-Metz Aerodrome (Toul), France, November 1918

The Second Army Air Service was established on 14 October 1918 by General Order, 287, GHQ. Paragraph 170 appointed Colonel Frank P. Lahm as Chief of Air Service, Second Army, thus establishing a separate Air Service organization. Headquarters was established at Croix-de-Metz Aerodrome, Toul, France.

As a result of the Armistice with Germany, American occupation forces would be sent to the German Rhineland. The Third Army Air Service, under the command of Brigadier General William Mitchell was organized on 14 November as the Air Service component of Third Army. First and Second Army Air Services were ordered to transfer some of their units at the front to Third Army as part of its organization, along with personnel from their Headquarters staffs along with the required equipment, ranging from office furniture to airplanes. The 5th Pursuit Group was transferred to Third Army on 19 November, along with the 41st, 138th and 638th Aero Squadrons.

On 15 April 1919, orders were received from Paris that the Second Army Air Service was to demobilize. The 85th, 141st, 168th, 258th, 278th, and 354th Aero Squadrons were transferred to Third Army, with the remainder of its organizations to report to the Services of Supply 1st Air Depot to turn in their equipment. After being processed at Colombey, personnel were assigned to the commanding general, Services of Supply, and sent to one of several staging depots in France where they awaited transport back to the United States and subsequent return to civilian life.

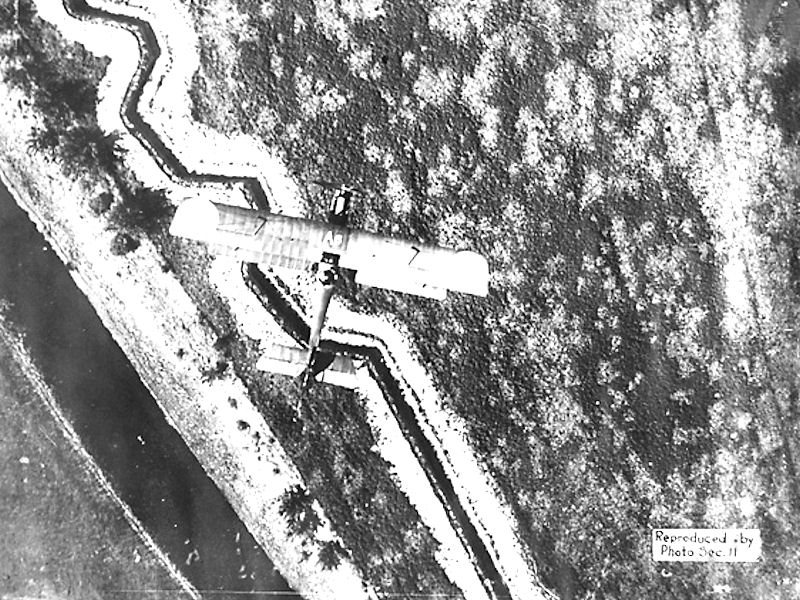
De Havilland DH.4 of the 354th Aero Squadron flying over the front line trenches in the Toul Sector, France, November 1918.

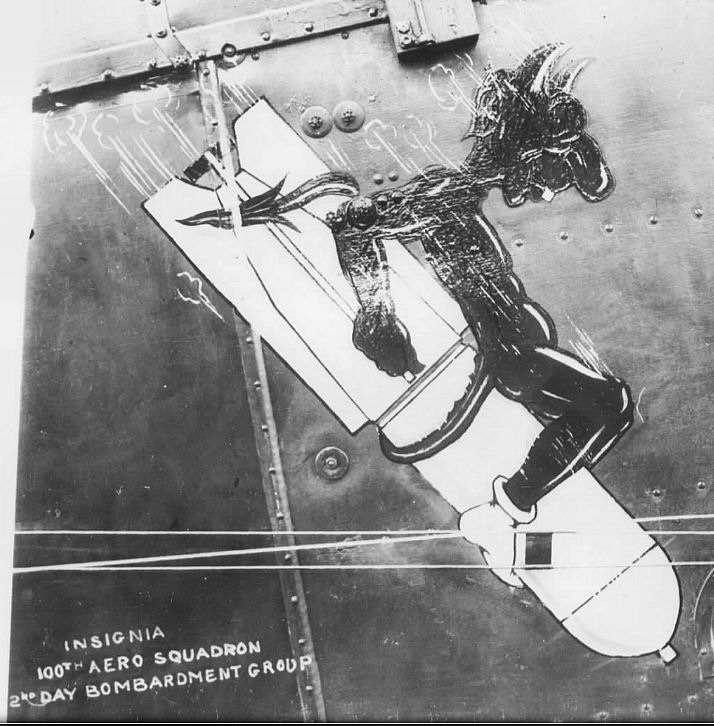
Squadron Emblem, painted on the fuselage of a De Havilland DH.4.

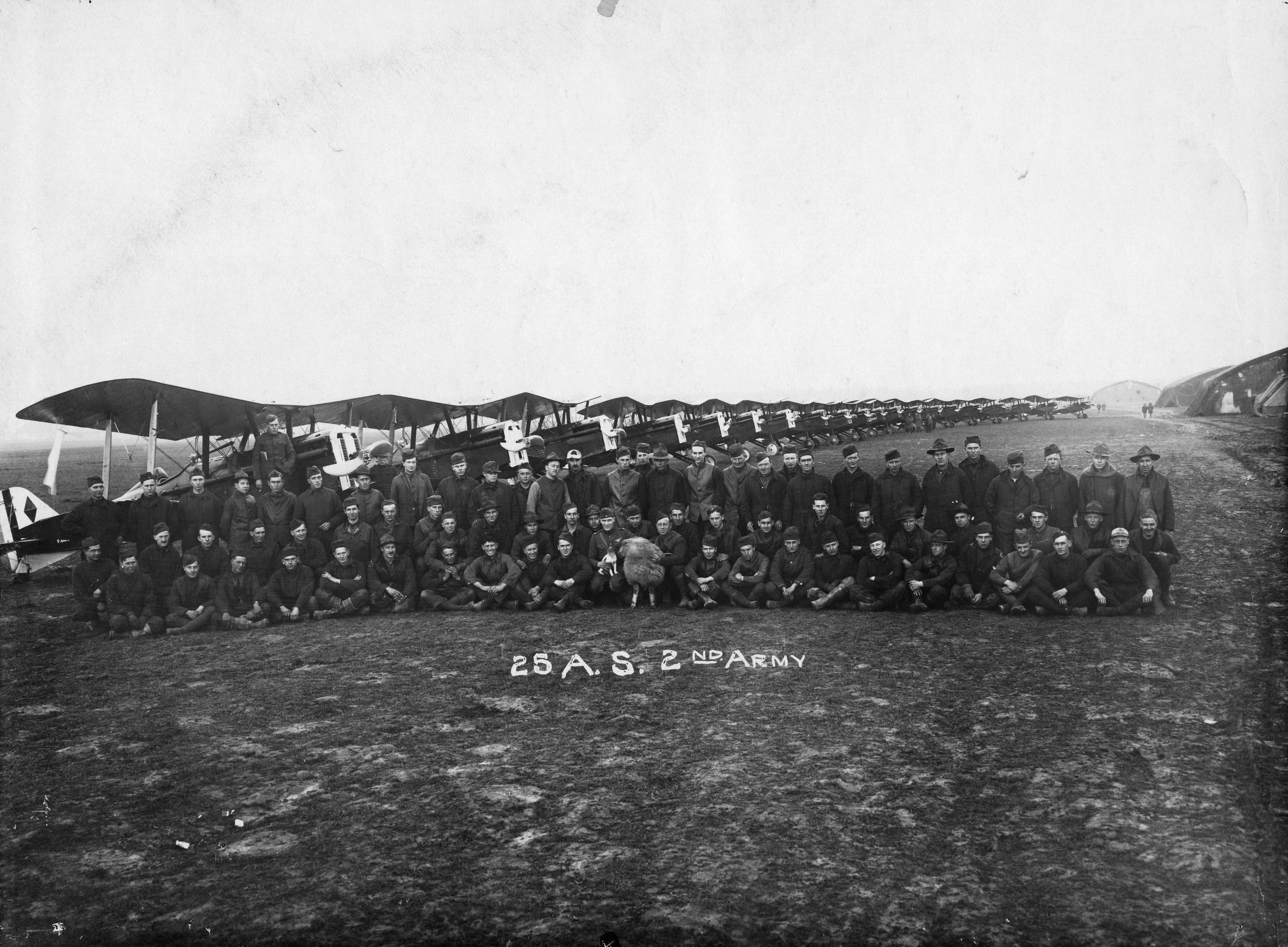
Royal Aircraft Factory S.E.5a's, 25th Aero Squadron enlisted corps with squadron commander Capt Reed Landis, Croix-de-Metz Aerodrome 1918

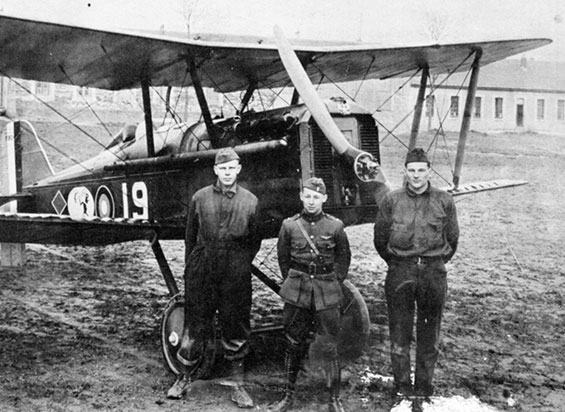
Joseph "Child Yank" Boudwin with mechanics and his last S.E. 5a, "19" of the 25th Aero Squadron

- HQ Second Army Air Service, 12 October 1918 – 15 April 1919 (Croix-de-Metz Aerodrome) (Toul)

Colonel Frank P. Lahm, Commander

  - Second Army Observation Wing (Croix-de-Metz Aerodrome) (Toul)

278th Aero Squadron (Army Observation), 14–21 November 1918

    - Second Army Observation Group 25 October-4 November 1918 (Chaumont Hill 402 Aerodrome)

Major C. Delaney, (attached from French Third Army), Commander

85th Aero Squadron (Army Observation), 25 October-4 November 1918 (Chaumont-Hill 402 Aerodrome, De Havilland DH.4)
Escadrilles Sal.28, Spa.47, and Spa.277, Aéronautique Militaire - (Saint-Mihiel Aerodrome) (Salmson 2.A2 and SPAD S.XIII)

  - IV Corps Observation Group 14 October-21 November 1918 (see page)

Major Harry B. Anderson, Commander

8th Aero Squadron (Corps Observation), 14-23 October 1918
85th Aero Squadron (Corps Observation), 4–21 November 1918 (Salmson 2.A2)
88th Aero Squadron (Corps Observation), 15–21 November 1918 (Salmson 2.A2)
135th Aero Squadron (Corps Observation), 14 October-21 November 1918 (De Havilland DH.4)
168th Aero Squadron (Corps Observation) 14 October 1918 – 21 November 1918 (De Havilland DH.4)
258th Aero Squadron (Corps Observation), 10–21 November 1918 (Salmson 2.A2)

  - VI Corps Observation Group 14 October-15 April 1919 (Saizerais Airfield)

Major Joseph T. McNarney, Commander

8th Aero Squadron (Corps Observation), 23 October 1918 – 21 November 1918 (Salmson 2.A2)
354th Aero Squadron (Corps Observation) 14 October 1918 – 15 April 1919 (De Havilland DH.4)

  - 2d Day Bombardment Group 1 November 1918 – 15 April 1919 (Ourches Aerodrome)

Major George E. A. Reinberg, Commander

100th Aero Squadron (Day Bombardment) 1 November 1918 – 15 April 1919 (De Havilland DH.4)
163d Aero Squadron (Day Bombardment) 1 November 1918 – 15 April 1919 (De Havilland DH.4)

  - 4th Pursuit Group 26 October 1918 – 15 April 1919 (Croix-de-Metz Aerodrome) (Toul)

Major Charles J. Biddle, Commander

17th Aero Squadron (Pursuit) 4 November 1918 – 12 December 1918 (SPAD S.XI)
25th Aero Squadron (Pursuit) 27 October 1918 – 15 April 1919 (RAF S.E. 5a)
141st Aero Squadron (Pursuit) 27 October 1918 – 15 April 1919 (SPAD S.XIII)
148th Aero Squadron (Pursuit) 4 November 1918 – 15 April 1919 (SPAD S.XI)

  - 5th Pursuit Group 15 November 1918 – 15 April 1919 (Lay-Saint-Remy Aerodrome)

Captain Dudley L. Hill, Commander

41st Aero Squadron (Pursuit), 15 November 1918 – 15 April 1919 (Sopwith Camel F.1)
138th Aero Squadron (Pursuit), 15 November 1918 – 15 April 1919 (Sopwith Camel F.1)
638th Aero Squadron (Pursuit), 15 November 1918 – 15 April 1919 (Sopwith Camel F.1)

  - Second Army Balloon Wing (Croix-de-Metz Aerodrome) (Toul)

Major John H. Jouett, Commander

(Six companies en route to front)
20 and 52 Balloon Companies, Aéronautique Militaire

    - IV Corps Balloon Group

15th, 18th, & 69th Balloon Companies

    - VI Corps Balloon Group

10th Balloon Company

== Third Army Air Service ==
Promptly after the armistice, the AEF formed the Third United States Army to march immediately into Germany while the remainder of the army demobilized. Brig. Gen. Mitchell was appointed to command the Third Army Air Service, on 14 November 1918. Gen. Mitchell was replaced in January as commander of the Third Army Air Service by Col. Harold Fowler, a combat veteran of the Royal Flying Corps and former commander of the American 17th Pursuit Squadron.

The most veteran units of the Air Service were selected to form the new Air Service. A pursuit unit, the 94th Aero Squadron; a day bombardment squadron, the 166th; and four observation squadrons (1st, 12th, 88th, and 9th Night) were initially assigned.

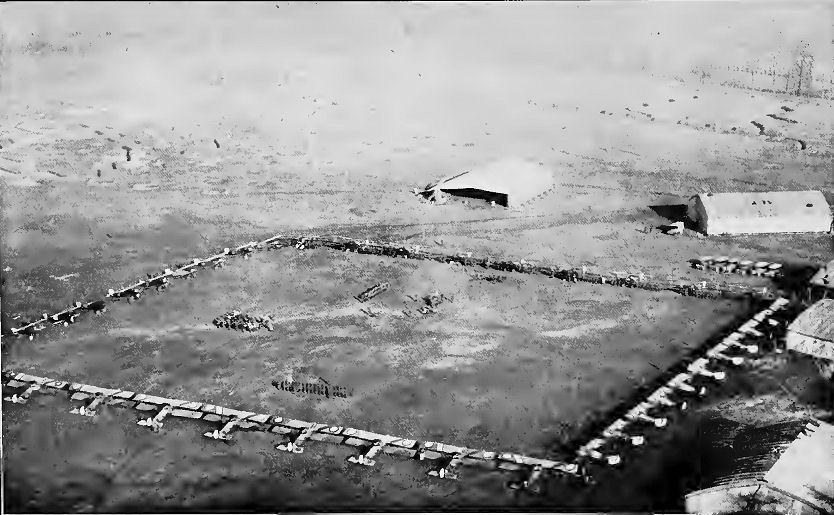
91st Aero Squadron - Coblenz Airfield, January 1919 medals ceremony.

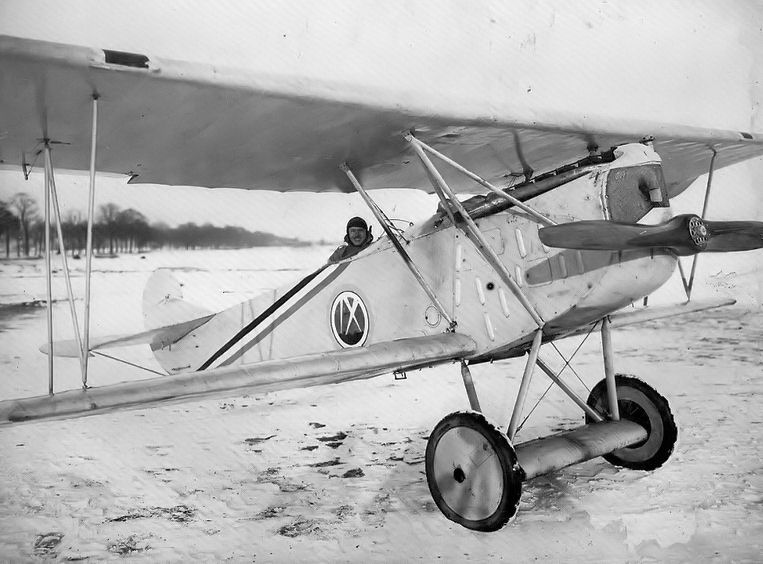
9th Aero Squadron - evaluating a captured Fokker D.VII, Trier Aerodrome

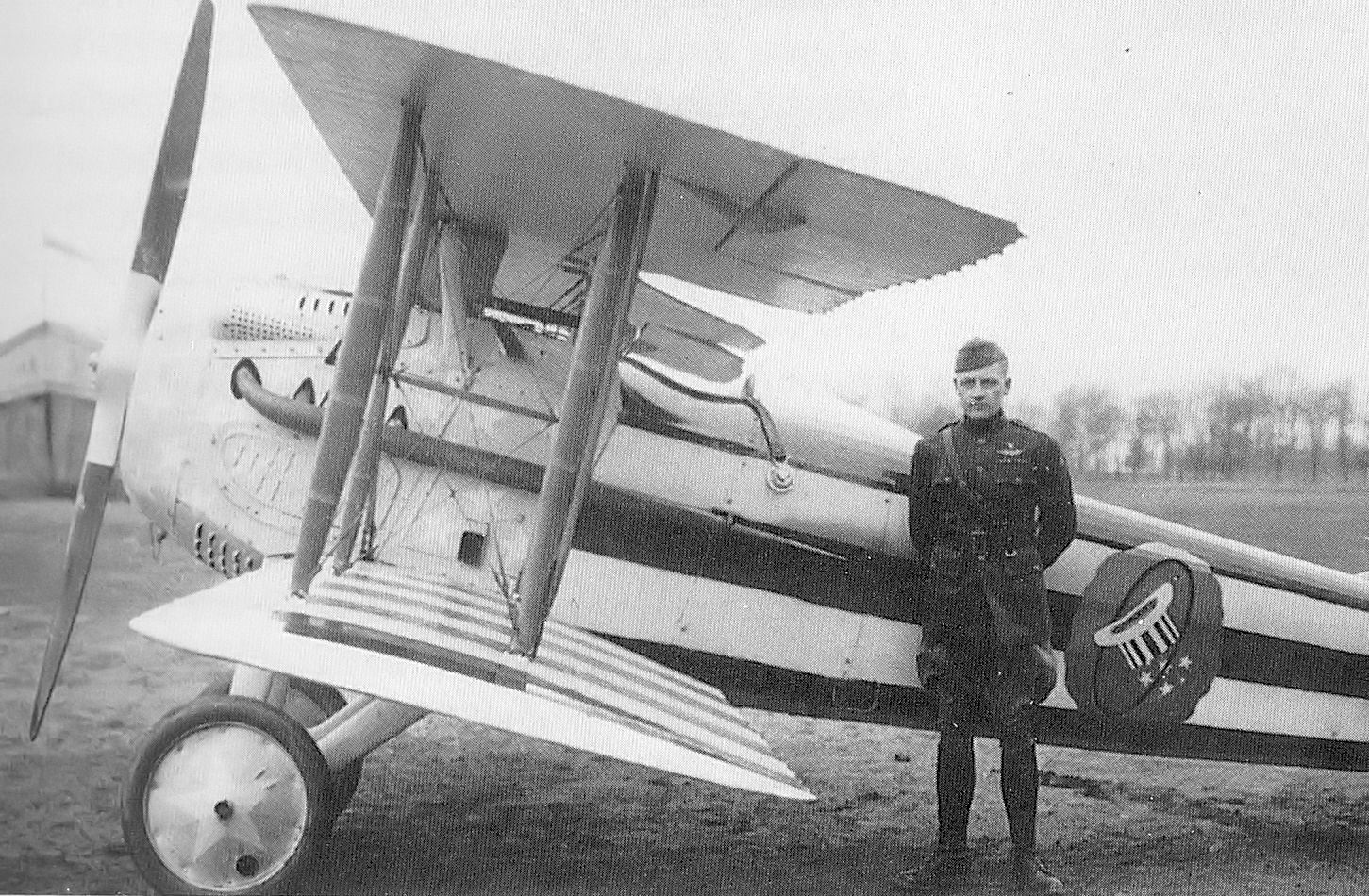
Major Reed Chambers, AEF 94th Pursuit Squadron next to a SPAD S.XIII, Coblenz Aerodrome

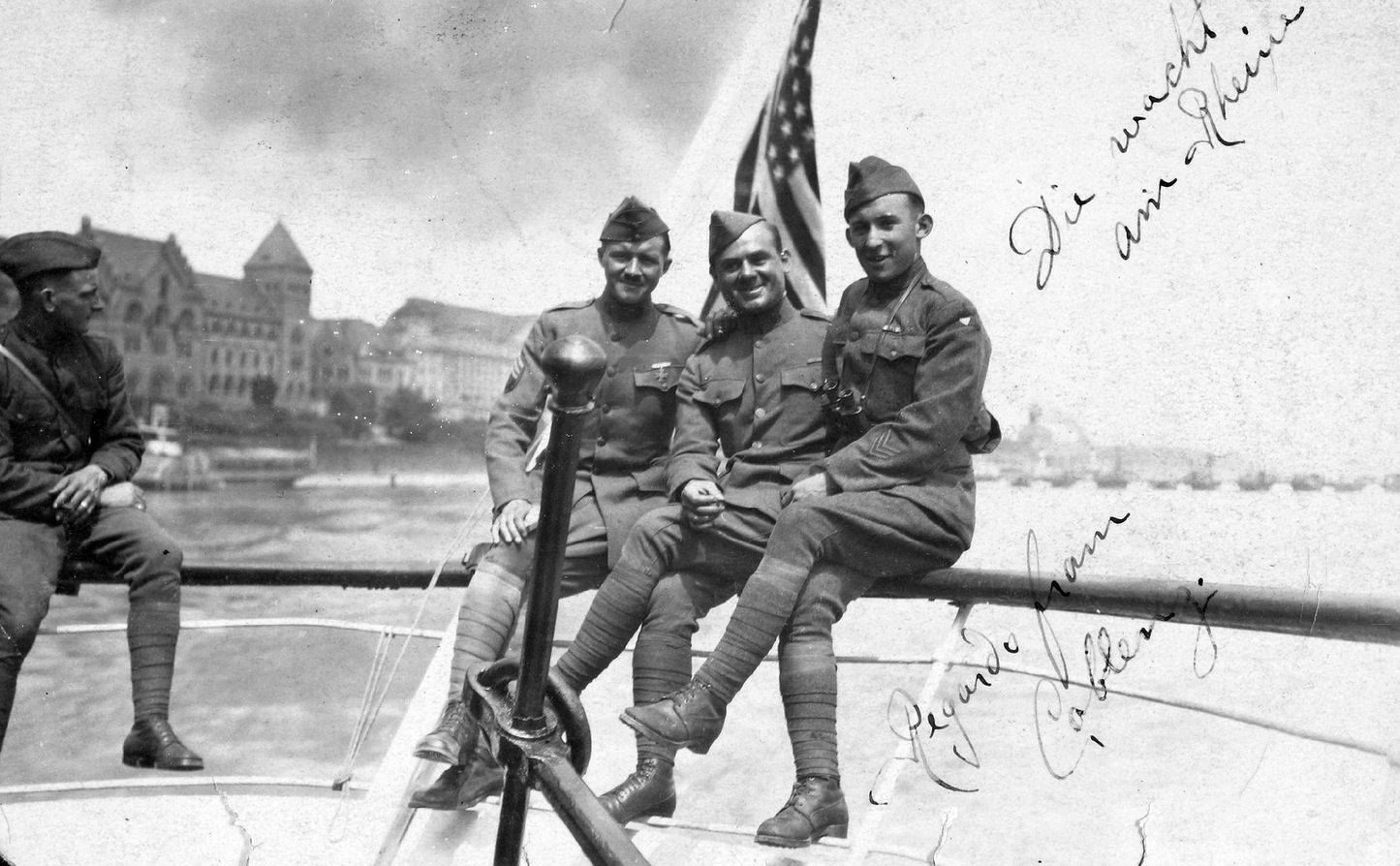
Members of the 1st Aero Squadron enjoying some R&R on a Rhine River Cruise, spring 1919

- HQ Third Army Air Service, 14 November 1918 – 2 July 1919 (HQ: see page).

9th Aero Squadron (Night Observation), 21 November 1918 – 15 April 1919
91st Aero Squadron (Observation), 21 November 1918 – 15 April 1919
94th Aero Squadron (Pursuit), 21 November 1918 – 15 April 1919
166th Aero Squadron (Day Bombardment), 21 November 1918 – 15 April 1919
24th Aero Squadron (Corps Observation), 12 May 1919 – 18 July 1919
138th Aero Squadron (Pursuit), 12 May-1 July 1919

  - III Corps Observation Group, 21 November 1918 – 12 May 1919 (HQ: see page) (Salmson 2.A2)

1st Aero Squadron (Corps Observation), 21 November 1918 – 12 May 1919
24th Aero Squadron (Corps Observation), 15 April 1919 – 12 May 1919
168th Aero Squadron (Corps Observation), 15 April 1919 – 12 May 1919
258th Aero Squadron (Corps Observation), 15 April 1919 – 12 May 1919

  - III Corps Balloon Group (Urbar)

1st, 3rd, 14th, 24th, and 44th Balloon Companies

  - IV Corps Observation Group, 21 November 1918 – 12 May 1919 (HQ: see page) (Salmson 2.A2)

12th Aero Squadron (Corps Observation), 21 November 1918 – 15 April 1919
88th Aero Squadron (Corps Observation), 21 November 1918 – 6 December 1918
85th Aero Squadron (Corps Observation), 15 April 1919 – 12 May 1919
278th Aero Squadron (Corps Observation), 15 April 1919 – 12 May 1919
354th Aero Squadron (Corps Observation), 15 April 1919 – 12 May 1919

  - VII Corps Observation Group, 14 November 1918 – 12 May 1919 (HQ: see page) (Salmson 2.A2)

9th Aero Squadron (Night Observation), 15 April 1919 – 12 May 1919 (De Havilland DH.4)
88th Aero Squadron (Corps Observation), 6 December 1918 – 12 May 1919
186th Aero Squadron (Corps Observation), 15 April 1919 – 12 May 1919

  - 5th Pursuit Group, 15 April 1919 – 12 May 1919

Coblenz Aerodrome (Sopwith F-1 Camel)

41st Aero Squadron (Pursuit), 15 April 1919 – 12 May 1919
138th Aero Squadron (Pursuit), 15 April 1919 – 12 May 1919
141st Aero Squadron (Pursuit), 15 April 1919 – 12 May 1919
638th Aero Squadron (Pursuit), 15 April 1919 – 12 May 1919

On 15 April 1919, the First and Second Army Air Services in France closed down, and the remainder of their personnel were returned to the United States. As a result, the Third Army Air Service was augmented with some of the few squadrons remaining in France. The Third Army Air Service's pursuit squadrons were consolidated at Coblenz. The 1st Aero Squadron and the remaining observation squadrons were consolidated at Weissenthurm and formed the III Corps Observation Group. The IV Corps Observation Group consisted of only the 85th Aero Squadron at Sinzing. The VII Corps Observation Group was at Trier.

On 15 May 1919, the Air Service was ordered to demobilize all of its flying units, which reported to the 1st Air Depot, Colombey-les-Belles Aerodrome, France for subsequent transfer to the Services of Supply for processing back to the United States from Channel ports of Embarkation in France. The remaining Air Service units were consolidated at Coblenz, with the other facilities in the Rhineland closed and dismantled. All foreign aircraft were returned to the French and British governments and personnel were demobilized in the United States by the end of July 1919.

== American Forces Germany ==
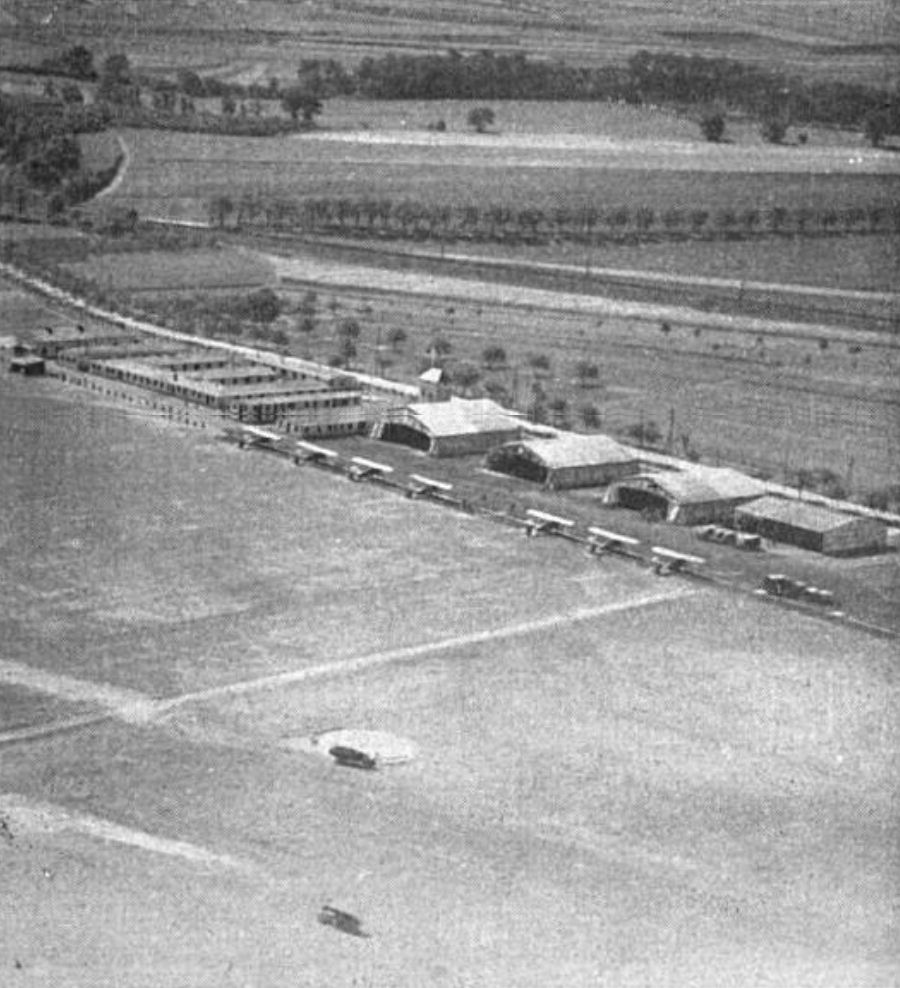
Weissenthurm Aerodrome, Germany, shown in 1921

The Treaty of Versailles officially came into effect in June 1919, and the Third Army Air Service was withdrawn. The Third Army Air Service officially was demobilized on 2 July 1919, and the American Forces Germany (AFG) took over the occupation duties in the Rhineland. In July 1920, it was decided to add an Air Service organization to the forces of the AFG, and on 23 July a detachment of officers and men were deployed to Germany, under the command of Major Frank M. Andrews. They were not assigned to any specific Aero Squadron, but to the AFG directly.

The Air Service personnel were established at Weissenthurm, south of Coblenz on the Rhine River. A new aerodrome was established, and some Bessonneau hangars were erected and quarters were established for personnel and offices. The contingent was equipped with 24 De Havilland DH.4 aircraft, powered by American Liberty engines. In March 1921, Army Engineers had erected facilities on the airfield and the Americans were moved to the airfield from the temporary facilities they occupied in the town during the winter. Occupation duties included all sorts and types of flying, such as test flights, photos of radio telegraph and radio telephone missions, joint flights with infantry, cavalry and artillery units during the winter and spring maneuvers, cross country flights and passenger carrying. A significant amount of aerial photography was taken for cartographic missions, and large mosaics of photos were created.

The postwar occupation mission was not popular with the American people, nor with the Americans sent to Germany, nor with the Germans. In 1922, President Harding began withdrawing American forces from the Rhineland. All AFG aviation activities were shut down in April and all of the excess equipment was disposed of through sales. On 24 January 1923, the last American forces departed from Germany, leaving Coblenz to the French, formally ending the United States involvement in World War I.

== See also ==
- List of United States Air Service aerodromes in France
- List of World War I flying aces from the United States

== Bibliography (Sources) ==
- Order of battle and commanders, 'Maurer Maurer (ed.) (1978). The U.S. Air Service in World War I, Volume I: The Final Report and A Tactical History, pp.391–392
- Locations and aircraft, Maurer Maurer Combat squadrons of the Air Force, World War II, USAF Historical Study 82, under individual unit entries
