= VII Corps Observation Group =

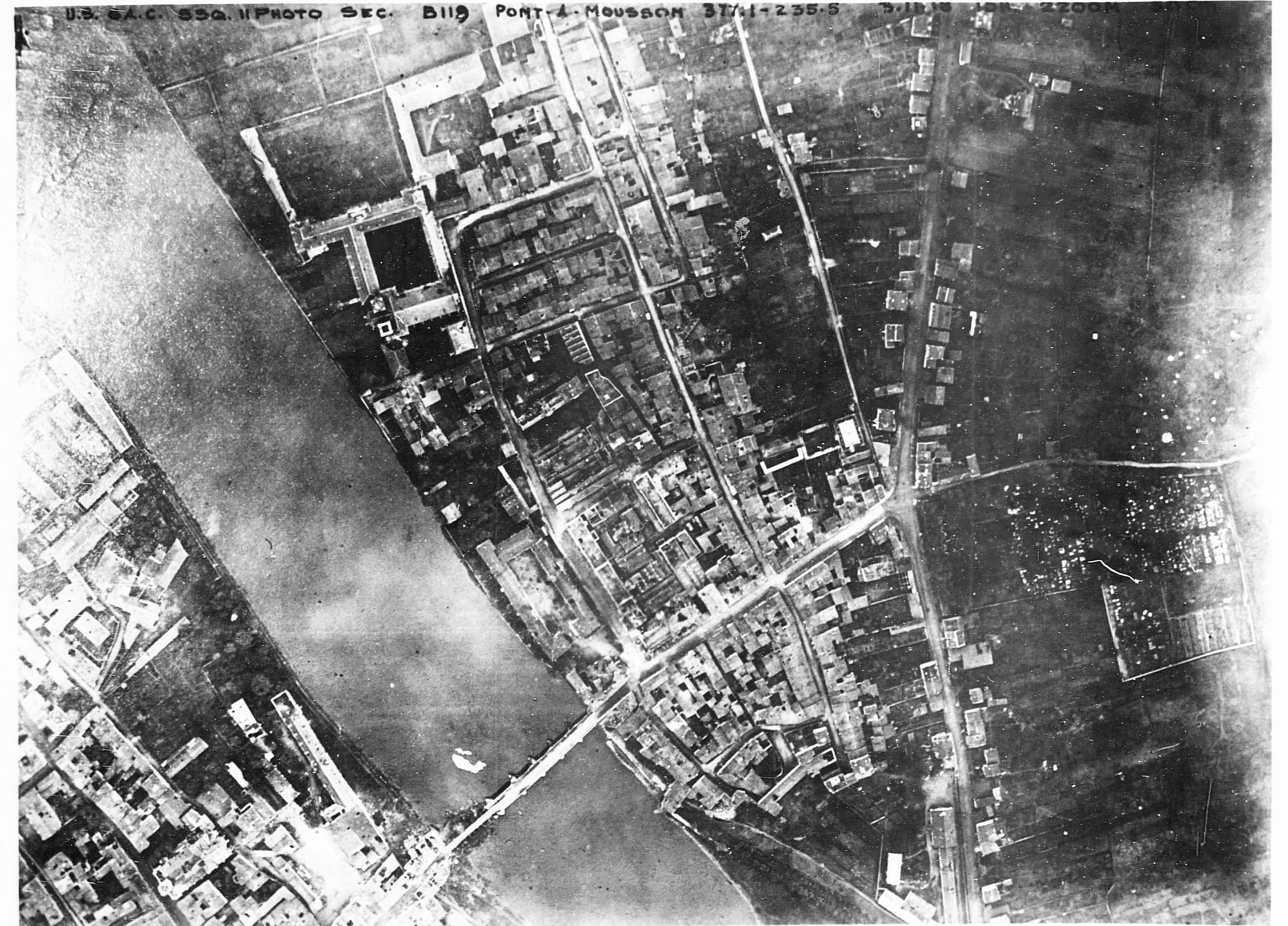
- Aerial photo of German-held Pont-à-Mousson, France, 3 November 1918. Taken by the 258th Aero Squadron (Corps Observation), VII Corps Observation Group.
- Active: 30 August 1918 – 12 May 1919
- Country: United States
- Branch: Air Service, United States Army
- Type: Group
- Role: Command and Control
- Part of: American Expeditionary Forces (AEF)
- Engagements: World War I Occupation of the Rhineland

Insignia
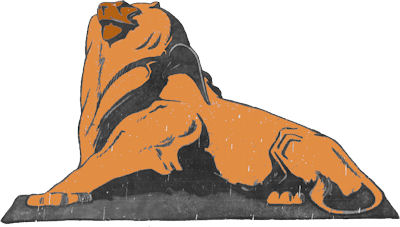
- 258th Aero Squadron Emblem

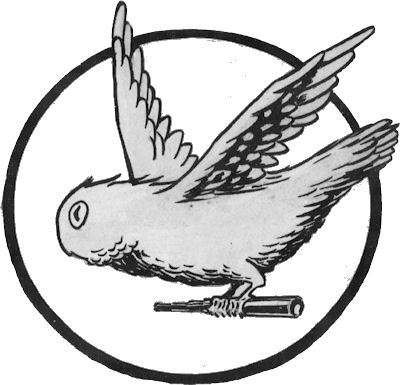
- 278th Aero Squadron Emblem

The VII Corps Observation Group was an Air Service, United States Army unit that fought on the Western Front during World War I as part of the First Army Air Service. It was later transferred to the Third Army Air Service as part of the United States Occupation of the Rhineland after the 1918 Armistice with Germany.

The group was demobilized in Germany on 12 May 1919 and its members returned to the United States. There is no modern United States Air Force unit that shares its lineage and history.

== History ==
=== First Army Air Service ===
Created on 1 August 1918 (?) and only organized as part of the VII Corps, United States Army on next 30 August, with headquarters established at Remicourt Aerodrome, France. The work at the headquarters was administrative organizational paperwork with the formation of the organization. The 258th Aero Squadron was assigned to the Group on 19 September, along with the 3d Photo Section, both stationed at Luxeuil-les-Bains Aerodrome.

The initial mission of the 258th was to perform liaison instruction with infantry divisions of the VII Corps. A school opened on 5 October and closed on the 19th. One flight of the 258th was stationed at Mathay Aerodrome, France, under the orders of the French, and were operating over the Belfort Front from 30 October to 7 November. On 7 November, the 258th was reassigned to Mathay and was reassigned to the Second Army Air Service. On 29 October, the 278th Aero Squadron was assigned to the Group, and was ordered to the Croix-de-Metz Aerodrome, near Toul on 10 November. On the 14th it was also assigned to Second Army.

=== Third Army Air Service ===
On 14 November, the VII Corps was assigned to the new United States Third Army, with a mission to occupy the northern Rhineland of Germany. The 88th Aero Squadron was assigned to the Group on 6 December for duty. VII Air Service Headquarters moved to Virton, Belgium on the 23d, and the 88th moved to Villers-la-Chevre Aerodrome in France on the 29th. Further movements were that headquarters moved to Grevenmacher, Luxembourg on 4 December and from there to Wittlich, Germany on the 12th. During this period, the 88th Squadron was doing panel exercises with the Corps radio station and march reconnaissances with the divisions on the march to Germany. The 88th moved to the Trier Airfield in Germany on 10 December. On 21 December, the VII Corps AS Headquarters moved from Wittlich to Trier.

In Germany, the Group was expanded with two additional Aero Squadrons on 15 April 1919, the 9th and the 186th. It also controlled two Photo Sections and three Balloon Companies. At Trier, the Group established a liaison school for detachments of the 89th and 90th Divisions on 8 January 1919, however, due to a shortage of officers in the divisions, the school was temporarily discontinued on the 18th.

On 12 May 1919, orders were received from Headquarters, Third Army, ordering the Group and all subordinate units to report to the Services of Supply, 1st Air Depot at Colombey-les-Belles Airdrome, France. There the Group was demobilized. Personnel were subsequently assigned to the Commanding General, Services of Supply and ordered to report to one of several staging camps in, France. There, personnel awaited scheduling to report to one of the Base Ports in France for transport to the United States and return to civilian life.

=== Lineage ===
- Organized in France as: VII Corps Observation Group, 30 August 1918

Demobilized on 12 May 1919

=== Assignments ===
- First Army Air Service, 30 August 1918
- Third Army Air Service, 14 November 1918 – 12 May 1919

=== Components ===
First Army Air Service

- 258th Aero Squadron (Corps Observation), 19 September – 7 November 1918

Flight detached to French Air Force, Mathay Airdrome, 30 October – 7 November 1918

- 278th Aero Squadron (Corps Observation), 29 October – 14 November 1918

Third Army Air Service

- 88th Aero Squadron (Corps Observation), 6 December 1918 – 12 May 1919
- 9th Aero Squadron (Night Observation), 15 April 1919 – 12 May 1919
- 186th Aero Squadron (Army Observation), 15 April – 12 May 1919

=== Stations ===
- Remicourt Aerodrome, France, 30 August 1918
- Virton, Belgium, 23 November 1918
- Grevenmacher, Luxembourg, 4 December 1918
- Wittlich, Germany, 12 December 1918
- Trier Airdrome, Germany, 21 December 1918 – 12 May 1919

== See also ==
- Organization of the Air Service of the American Expeditionary Force
