= Lemmes =

- Commune
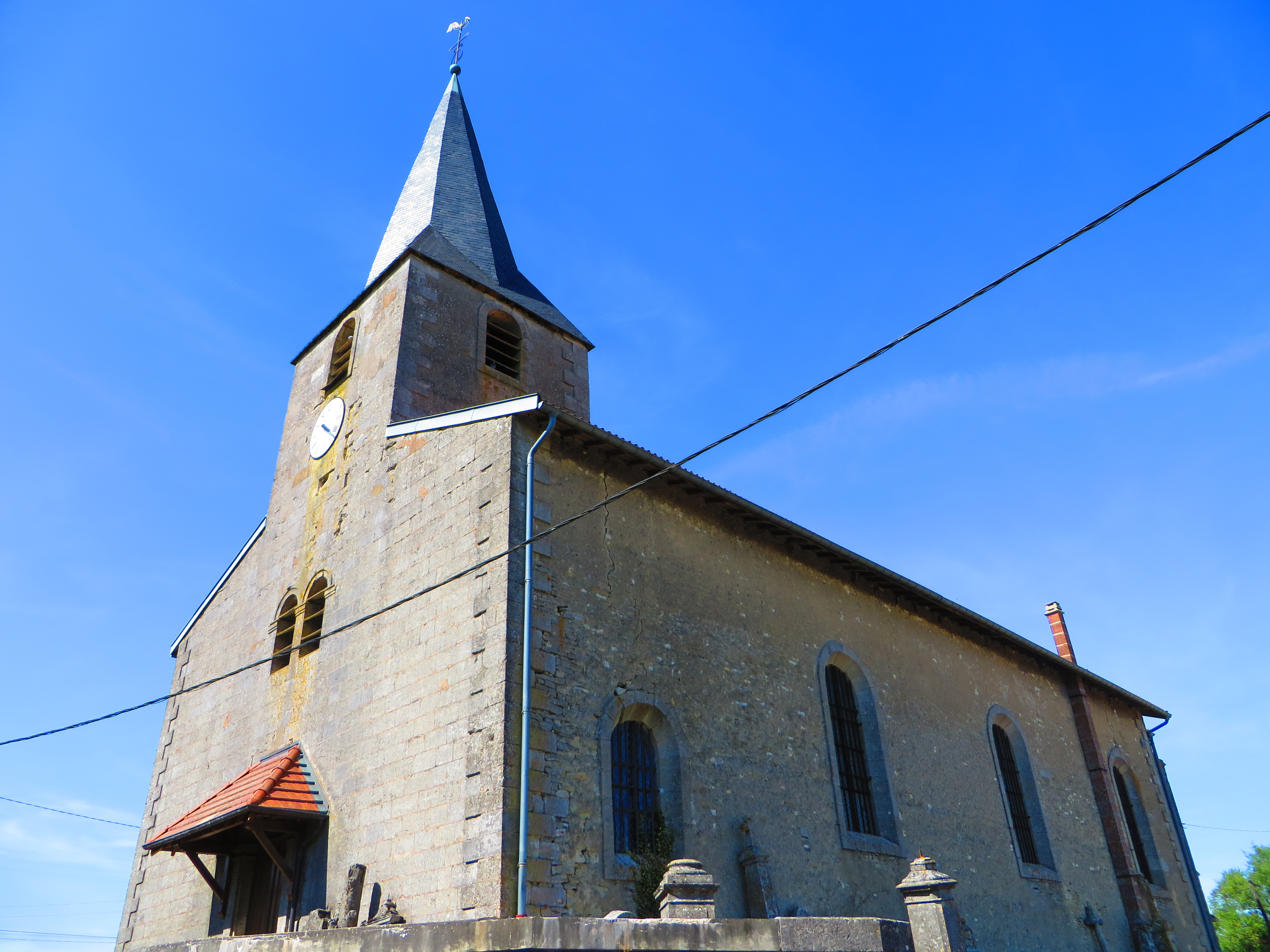
- The church in Lemmes
- Location of Lemmes
- Location within France Location within Grand Est
- Coordinates: 49°04′03″N 5°17′11″E
- Country: France
- Region: Grand Est
- Department: Meuse
- Arrondissement: Verdun
- Canton: Dieue-sur-Meuse

Government
  - Mayor (2020–2026): Hervé Corvisier
- Area^{1}: 11.05 km^{2} (4.27 sq mi)
- Elevation: 290 m (950 ft)
- Highest elevation: 320 m (1,050 ft)
- Lowest elevation: 238 m (781 ft)
- Population (2023): 240
  - Density: 22/km^{2} (56/sq mi)
- Time zone: UTC+01:00 (CET)
  - Summer (DST): UTC+02:00 (CEST)
- INSEE/Postal code: 55286 /55220
- ^{1} French Land Register data, which excludes lakes, ponds, glaciers > 1 km^{2} (0.386 sq mi or 247 acres) and river estuaries.

Lemmes (French pronunciation: [lɛm]) is a commune in the Meuse department in Grand Est in north-eastern France. It is approximately 9 miles (14 km) south-west of Verdun.

== See also ==
- Communes of the Meuse department
