= 138th Aero Squadron =

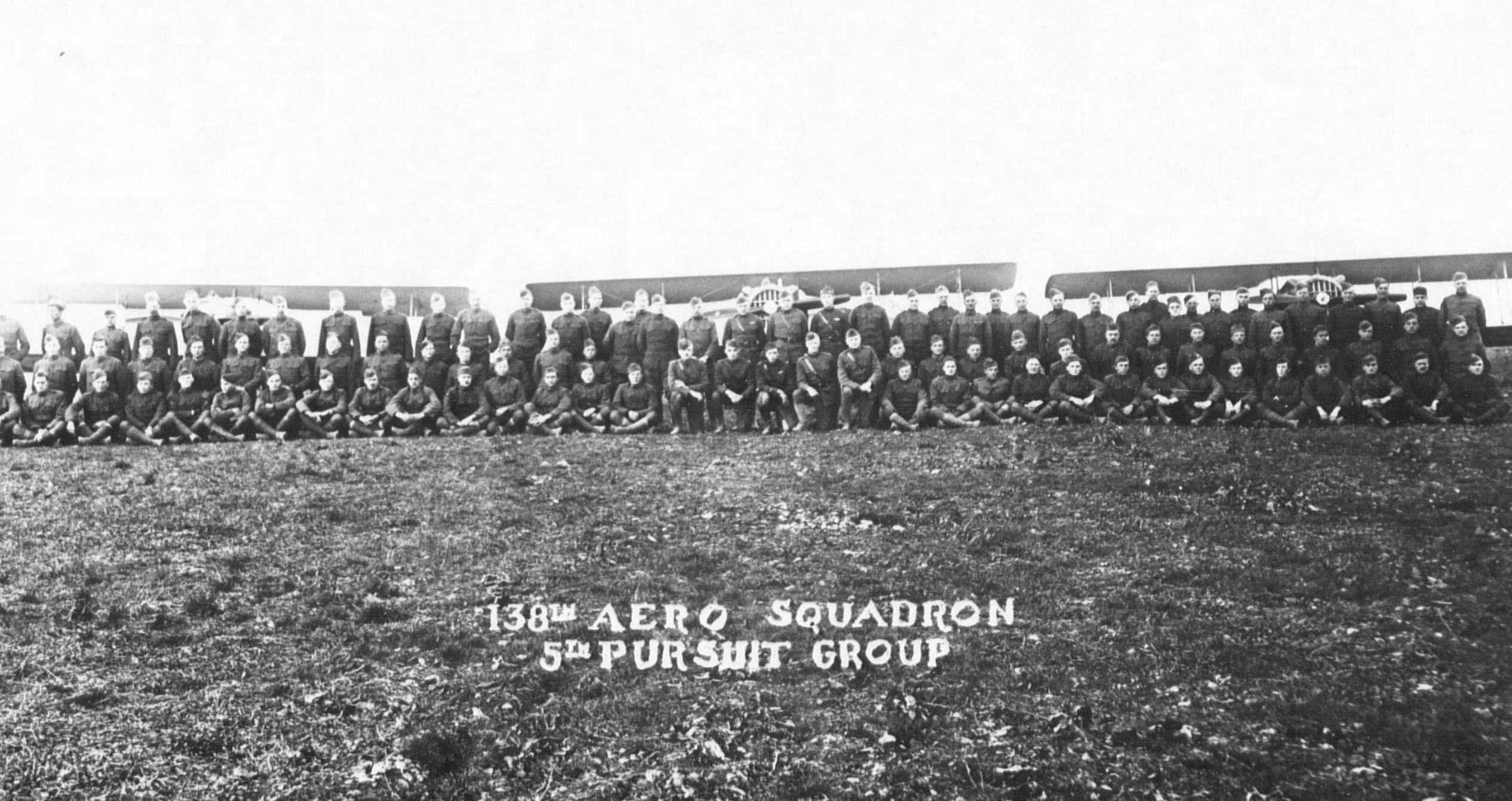
- 138th Aero Squadron formation, Lay-Saint-Remy Aerodrome, France, November 1919
- Active: 28 September 1917 – 30 August 1919
- Country: United States
- Branch: United States Army Air Service
- Type: Squadron
- Role: Pursuit
- Part of: American Expeditionary Forces (AEF)
- Engagements: World War I Occupation of the Rhineland

Commanders
- Notable commanders: Capt. Dudley Hill

Insignia
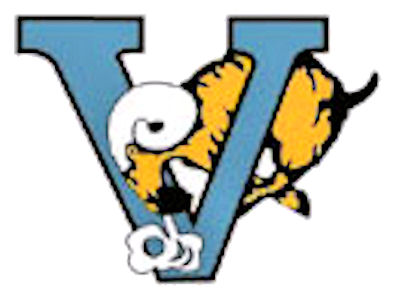
- 138th Aero Squadron Emblem

Aircraft flown
- Fighter: Sopwith Camel F.1, 1918–1919
- Trainer: Curtiss R-4, 1917–1918

Service record
- Operations: 5th Pursuit Group; Western Front, France: 28 October-11 November 1918; Not fully equipped at time of armistice, did not see any combat.

The 138th Aero Squadron was a United States Army Air Service unit that fought on the Western Front during World War I.

The squadron was assigned as a Day Pursuit (Fighter) Squadron as part of the 5th Pursuit Group, Second United States Army. Its mission was to engage and clear enemy aircraft from the skies and provide escort to reconnaissance and bombardment squadrons over enemy territory.

The squadron was never fully organized, and with Second Army's planned offensive drive on Metz cancelled due to the 1918 Armistice with Germany, the squadron was assigned to the United States Third Army as part of the Occupation of the Rhineland in Germany. It returned to the United States in August 1919 and was demobilized.

The squadron was never re-activated, and there is no United States Air Force or Air National Guard squadron that carries its lineage and history.

== History ==
=== Origins ===
The 138th Aero Squadron was organized on 28 September 1917 at Kelly Field, Texas. Prior to this, the men of the squadron had spent several weeks at various recruiting barracks around the country, and were brought to Kelly Field in August, before the formal organization of the unit. While there, they undertook infantry drill and camp duties. The men lived in tents and messed in the open, having to contend with the heat, wind and dust of the late Texas summer.

The squadron was ordered to proceed to Post Field, Oklahoma, on 18 October where it was assigned for training by the 3d and 4th Aero Squadrons. At Post Field, the squadron received instruction in transportation, engineering, aero repair, flying field management, hangars, post headquarters and quartermaster supply duties. An outbreak of measles struck the squadron at Post Field, and it extended the amount of time that would normally be spent at the station. On 5 December the squadron began to train with some Curtiss R-4 aircraft, with several aviation cadets taking primary flight training. Finally on 16 February, the men of the squadron were examined for overseas duty and were ordered to prepare for service in France.

On 18 February, along with the 137th Aero Squadron, the squadron departed for the Aviation Concentration Center, Mineola Field, Long Island, New York. After receiving equipment, it moved to the Port of Entry, Hoboken, New Jersey, on 5 March and boarded the RMS Cedric, a White Star Liner impressed into troop ship duty. The trans-Atlantic voyage to Liverpool, England, was uneventful, and the squadron arrived on 18 March. It then proceeded by train to the Romsey Rest Camp, Winchester.

=== Training in England ===
At Romsey the squadron was detached to the Royal Flying Corps (RFC) for advanced training. It was sent to RFC Montrose, Scotland, arriving on 26 March, where it was assigned to the RFC's 5th Wing. The training the squadron had received in the United States enabled it to make a valuable contribution to the wing's activities. By the beginning of August the squadron was eager to go to the front, and on the 14 August it departed Montrose for Flower Down Rest Camp, Winchester, having been ordered to duty in France.

=== Western Front ===
Arriving on the 17 August, transportation was scarce and it did not arrive at Cherbourg, France, until the 19 August before moving to the Replacement Concentration Center, AEF, at St. Maixent Replacement Barracks, where it arrived on the 22 August. There, the squadron was equipped with steel helmets, firearms and gas masks. It was also designated as a Pursuit Squadron. From St. Maixent, the squadron then proceeded to the Air Service Production Center No. 2, Romorantin Aerodrome, arriving on 29 August. At Romorantin, the squadron was engaged in fatigue and garrison duties. Next, it went to the 1st Air Depot, Colombey-les-Belles Airdrome on 20 September. There, all preparations were made for active service as a Pursuit Squadron, with pilots and an armament officer being assigned. On 5 November, sixteen British Sopwith Camel F.1s were assigned to the squadron. On the 14 November, together with the 41st and 638th Aero Squadrons, the 138th traveled from Colombey to its new aerodrome at Lay-Saint-Remy.

=== Post-Armistice activities ===
At Lay-Saint-Remy Aerodrome, the three squadrons constituted the 5th Pursuit Group, Air Service, Second Army. Despite the signing of the Armistice, the squadron continued to engage in flying and undertook proficiency flights, and training in formation flying, patrols and in air combat on schedule each day when the weather permitted, although all flying was performed in friendly territory. Demonstration flying was also performed for various events to thrill crowds and to demonstrate to the other branches of the service the capabilities of the Air Service. The pilots were skilled in aerobatic flying, and no accidents resulted from these exhibitions.

On 15 April 1919, orders were received that the Second Army Air Service was being demobilized. The entire 5th Pursuit Group was ordered to Coblenz, Germany, to become part of the Third Army Air Service. The squadron prepared for the journey, and their equipment and supplies were moved the 200-odd miles in their own trucks. The enlisted personnel moved by rail and also by truck, while the pilots ferried their aircraft to their new airfield in the Rhineland.

The squadron established itself in Fort Kaiser Alexander, which had been built by Wilhelm Hohenzollern's grandfather. The fort commanded a high ridge between the Rhine and Moselle rivers, overlooking the city. At Coblenz, the groups flew their assigned aircraft, and also performed test flights on surrendered German aircraft. Flights of the Fokker D.VII, Pfalz D.XII, Halberstadts, and Rumpler aircraft were made and evaluations made.

=== Demobilization ===
The entire air service of the Third Army, except that of the III Corps Observation Group at Weißenthurm Airdrome, were relieved from further duty, on 12 May 1919 and ordered demobilized. Yet, the 138th Aero Squadron seems to have stayed for some time in Koblenz with Third Army Air Service, as it did not reached the 1st Air Depot at Colombey-les-Belles Airdrome, France before 1 July, for subsequent demobilization. The squadron's Sopwith aircraft were delivered to the Air Service American Air Service Acceptance Park No. 1 at Orly Aerodrome to be returned to the British. There practically all of the pilots and observers were detached from the squadron.

Personnel at Colombey were subsequently assigned to the commanding general, services of supply, and ordered to report to one of several staging camps in France. There, personnel awaited scheduling to report to one of the base ports in France for transport to the United States. The 138th Aero Squadron arrived in New York Harbor in late July after which it was sent to Mitchell Field, Long Island, where it was demobilized in August 1919.

=== Significant Personnel ===
- Captain Dudley L Hill, Commander 22 August 1918 to 18 November 1918 and member of the Lafayette Escadrille previously.

=== Lineage ===
- Organized as 138th Aero Squadron on 28 September 1917

Re-designated: 138th Aero Squadron (Pursuit) on 22 August 1918
Demobilized on 30 August 1919

=== Assignments ===
- Post Headquarters, Kelly Field, 28 September 1917
- Post Headquarters, Post Field, 18 October 1917
- Aviation Concentration Center, 18 February 1918
- Air Service Headquarters, AEF, British Isles

Attached to the Royal Flying Corps for training, 26 March – 14 August 1918

- Replacement Concentration Center, AEF, 22 August 1918
- Air Service Production Center No. 2, 29 August 1918
- 1st Air Depot, 20 September 1918
- 5th Pursuit Group, 14 November 1918
- Third Army Air Service, 12 May 1919
- 1st Air Depot, 1 July 1919
- Commanding General, Services of Supply, July–August 1919
- Post Headquarters, Mitchell Field, August 1919

=== Stations ===
- Kelly Field, Texas, 28 September 1917
- Post Field, Oklahoma, 18 October 1917
- Aviation Concentration Center, Garden City, New York, 18 February 1918
- Port of Entry, Hoboken, New Jersey, 5 March 1918

Overseas transport: RMS Carmania, 5–18 March 1918

- Liverpool, England, 18 March 1918
- Romsey Rest Camp, Winchester, England, 18 March 1918
- RFC Montrose, Scotland, 26 March 1918
- Flower Down Rest Camp, Winchester, England, 14 August 1918
- Cherbourg, France, 19 August 1918
- St. Maixent Replacement Barracks, France, 22 August 1918
- Romorantin Aerodrome, France, 29 August 1918
- Colombey-les-Belles Airdrome, France, 20 September 1918
- Lay-Saint-Remy Aerodrome, France, 14 November 1918
- Coblenz Airdrome, Fort Kaiser Alexander, Germany, 15 April 1919
- Colombey-les-Belles Airdrome, France, 1 July 1919
- France, July – August 1919
- Mitchell Field, New York, August 1919

=== Enemy aircraft flown for evaluation ===
- Evaluated Fokker D.VII, Pfalz D.XII, Halberstadt and Rumpler aircraft, 1919

== See also ==
- Organization of the Air Service of the American Expeditionary Force
- List of American aero squadrons
