= 638th Aero Squadron =

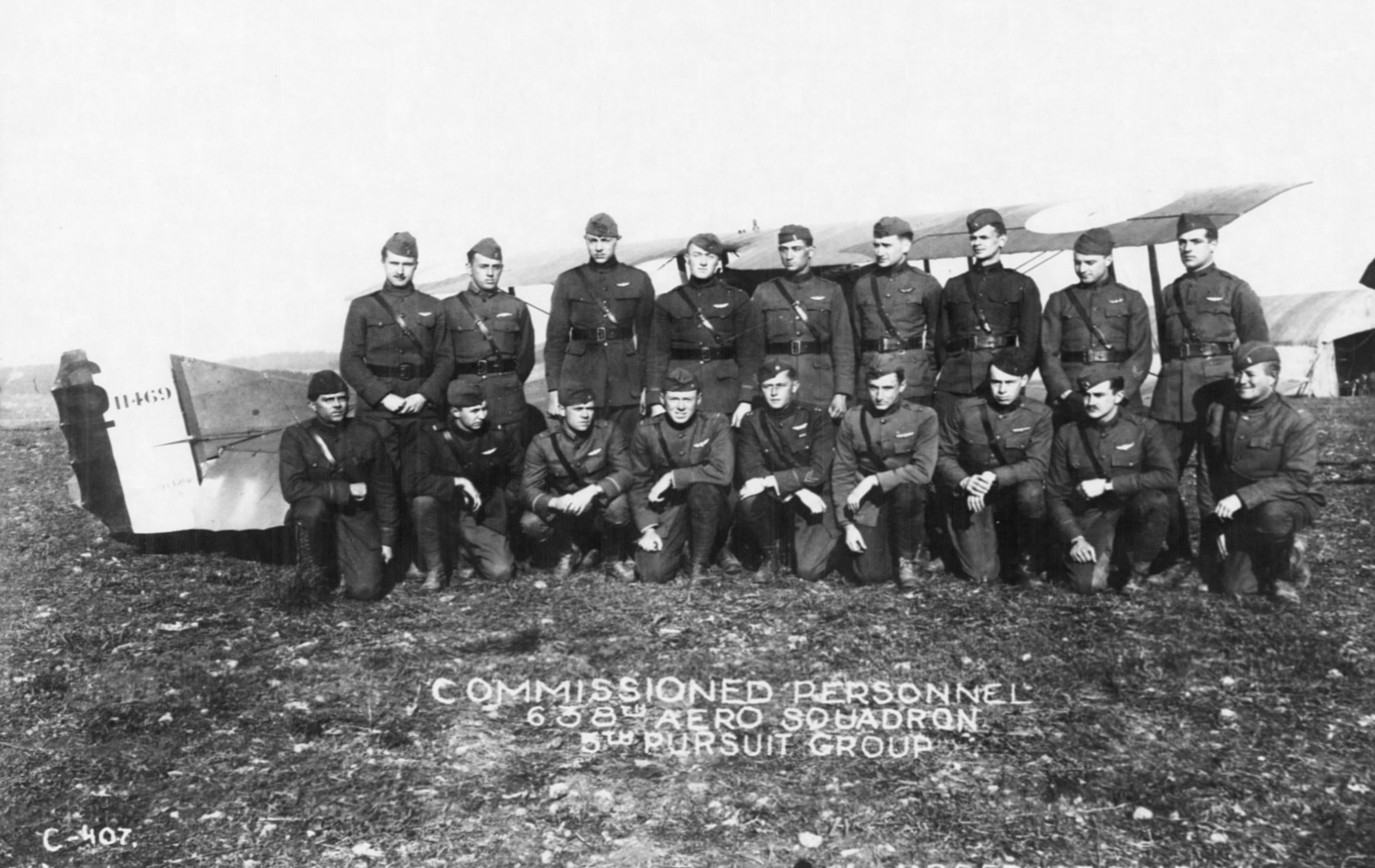
- 638th Aero Squadron, pilots, Lay-Saint-Remy Aerodrome, France, November 1918
- Active: 30 August 1917 – 30 July 1919
- Country: United States
- Branch: Air Service, United States Army
- Type: Squadron
- Role: Pursuit
- Part of: American Expeditionary Forces (AEF)
- Engagements: World War I Occupation of the Rhineland

Commanders
- Notable commanders: Lt. Fred B. Ashworth

Insignia
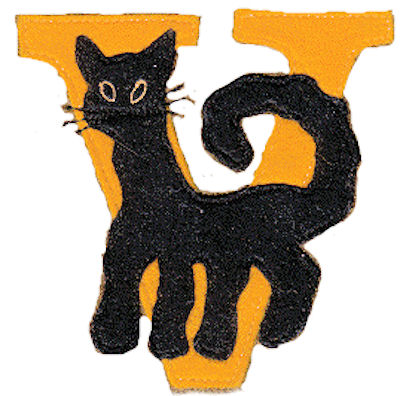
- 638th Aero Squadron Emblem

Aircraft flown
- Fighter: Sopwith Camel F.1, 1918-1919

Service record
- Operations: 5th Pursuit Group; Western Front, France: 28 October – 11 November 1918; Not fully equipped at time of the armistice, did not see any combat.

The 638th Aero Squadron was an Air Service, United States Army unit that fought on the Western Front during World War I.

The squadron was assigned as a Day Pursuit (Fighter) Squadron as part of the 5th Pursuit Group, Second United States Army. Its mission was to engage and clear enemy aircraft from the skies and provide escort to reconnaissance and bombardment squadrons over enemy territory.

The squadron was never fully organized, and with Second Army's planned offensive drive on Metz canceled due to the 1918 Armistice with Germany, the squadron was assigned to the United States Third Army as part of the Occupation of the Rhineland in Germany. It returned to the United States in July 1919 and was demobilized.

The squadron was never re-activated, and there is no United States Air Force or Air National Guard squadron that carries its lineage and history.

== History ==
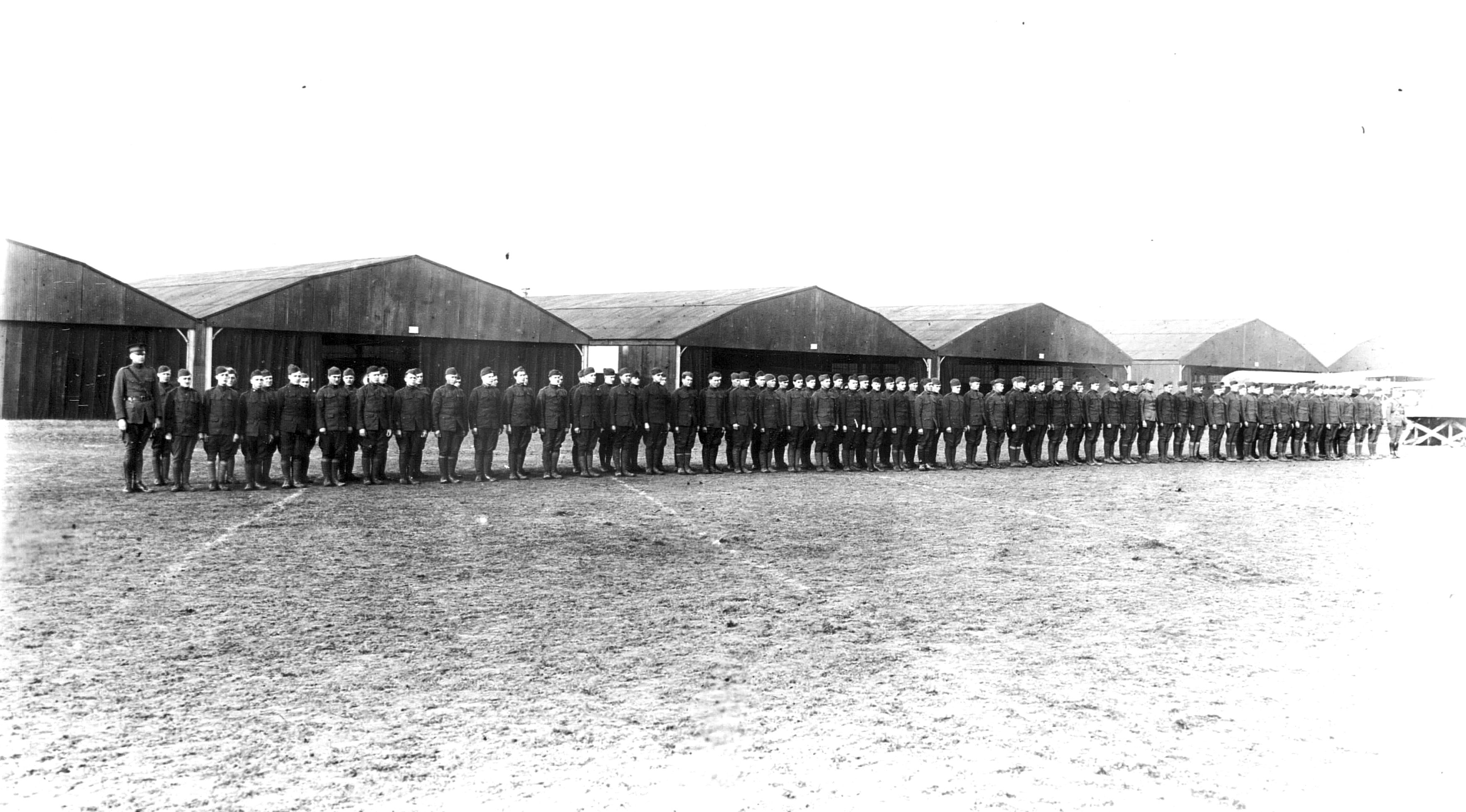
638th Aero Squadron formation at Colombey-les-Belles Airdrome, France

The 638th Aero Squadron was organized as the 117th Aero Squadron on 30 August 1917 at Kelly Field, Texas. While at Kelly Field, the squadron received its preliminary indoctrination training and performed the usual camp fatigue duties. On 26 October, the squadron received orders for overseas duty, and proceeded to the Aviation Concentration Center, Mineola Field, Long Island, New York, arriving on 31 October. While there, the squadron contributed its share of labor towards the construction of the facility and went through the process of equipping and preparing for foreign service.

The squadron moved to the Port of Entry, Hoboken, New Jersey on 16 December, and boarded the Cunard Liner SS Orduna on 17 December, bound for Liverpool, England. The voyage across the Atlantic was uneventful with the exception of extremely rough weather on Christmas Day. Also, a pilot boat was sunk off the Irish Coast by a mine or a submarine. This forced a change of destination, the Orduna turning into the River Clyde and docking in Glasgow, Scotland on 31 December. From there, the squadron traveled by train to the Morn Hill Rest Camp, Winchester, arriving on 1 January 1918.

At Winchester, the squadron was attached to the Royal Flying Corps (RFC) for advanced training. It was divided into flights: “A” Flight was sent to RFC Harlaxton, “B” Flight to RFC Spittlegate, and “C” and “D” Flights to RFC Catterick. At these stations, personnel received instruction in aircraft construction, engine maintenance, motor transport, and other technical skills. The flights were later posted to additional RFC stations before being reassembled at Camp Flower Down, Winchester, on 17 August. There, the squadron underwent a final examination and inspection by British authorities before receiving orders for deployment to the front.

The now 638th Aero Squadron moved to Southampton, and crossed the English Channel, arriving at American Rest Camp #2, Le Havre, France on 28 August. It then was moved to the Replacement Concentration Center, AEF, at St. Maixent Replacement Barracks, where it arrived on 31 August. There, the squadron was equipped with steel helmets firearms, and gas masks. It was also designated as a Pursuit Squadron. It then was ordered to proceed to the 1st Air Depot at Colombey-les-Belles Airdrome on 26 October. There, all preparations were made for active service as a Pursuit Squadron, with pilots and an armament officer being assigned. On 5 November, sixteen British Sopwith Camel F.1s were assigned to the squadron. On the 14th, together with the 41st and 138th Aero Squadrons, the 638th traveled from Colombey to its new aerodrome at Lay-Saint-Remy.

=== Post-Armistice activities ===
At Lay-Saint-Remy Aerodrome, the three squadrons constituted the 5th Pursuit Group, Air Service, Second Army. Despite the Armistice being signed, the squadron engaged in flying flew proficiency flights, training in formation flying, patrols, and in air combat being on the schedule each day the weather permitted, although all flying was performed in friendly territory. Also, demonstration flying was performed for various events to thrill the crowd and to demonstrate to the other branches of the service the capabilities of the Air Service. The pilots were skilled in aerobatic flying, and no accidents ever resulted from an exhibition.

On 15 April 1919, orders were received that the Second Army Air Service was being demobilized. The entire 5th Pursuit Group was ordered to Coblenz, Germany to become part of the Third Army Air Service. The squadron prepared to move, and their equipment and supplies were moved the 200-odd miles in their own trucks. The enlisted personnel moved by rail and also by truck, while the pilots ferried their aircraft to their new airfield in the Rhineland.

The squadron made itself comfortable in Fort Kaiser Alexander, which was built by Wilhelm Hohenzollern's grandfather. The fort commanded a high ridge between the Rhine and Moselle rivers, overlooking the city. At Coblenz, the groups flew a mixture of their assigned aircraft, and also they were able to perform test flights on surrendered German aircraft. Flights of the Fokker D.VII, Pfalz D.XII, Halberstadts and Rumpler aircraft were made and evaluations were made.

=== Demobilization ===
The entire air service of the Third Army, excepting that of the III Corps Observation Group at Weißenthurm Airdrome, was relieved from further duty with the Third Army, on 12 May 1919 and ordered demobilized. The 638th Aero Squadron was ordered to proceed to the 1st Air Depot at Colombey-les-Belles Airdrome, France for subsequent demobilization. The squadron's Sopwith aircraft were delivered to the Air Service American Air Service Acceptance Park No. 1 at Orly Aerodrome to be returned to the British. There practically all of the pilots and observers were detached from the squadron.

Personnel at Colombey were subsequently assigned to the commanding general, services of supply, and ordered to report to one of several staging camps in France. There, personnel awaited scheduling to report to one of the base ports in France for transport to the United States and subsequent demobilization. The 638th Aero Squadron arrived in New York Harbor in late July and arrived in New York Harbor. It was sent to Mitchell Field, Long Island, where it was demobilized in July 1919.

=== Lineage ===
- Organized as 117th Aero Squadron on 30 August 1917

Re-designated: 638th Aero Squadron on 1 February 1918
Re-designated: 638th Aero Squadron (Pursuit) on 31 August 1918
Demobilized on 31 July 1919

=== Assignments ===
- Post Headquarters, Kelly Field, 30 August 1917
- Aviation Concentration Center, 31 October 1917
- Air Service Headquarters, AEF, British Isles

Attached to the Royal Flying Corps for training, 1 January 1918 – 28 August 1918

- Replacement Concentration Center, AEF, 31 August 1918
- 1st Air Depot, 26 October 1918
- 5th Pursuit Group, 14 November 1918
- 1st Air Depot, 12 May 1919
- Commanding General, Services of Supply, May–July 1919
- Post Headquarters, Mitchell Field, July 1919

=== Stations ===
- Kelly Field, Texas, 30 August 1917
- Aviation Concentration Center, Garden City, New York, 31 October 1917
- Port of Entry, Hoboken, New Jersey, 16 December 1917

Overseas transport: SS Orduna, 17–31 December 1917

- Glasgow, Scotland, 31 December 1917
- Morn Hill Rest Camp, Winchester, England, 1 January 1918
- Various stations in Scotland and England, January–August 1918
- Flower Down Rest Camp, Winchester, England, 17 August 1917
- American Rest Camp #2, Le Havre, France, 28 August 1918
- St. Maixent Replacement Barracks, France, 31 August 1918
- Colombey-les-Belles Airdrome, France, 26 October 1918
- Lay-Saint-Remy Aerodrome, France, 14 November 1918
- Coblenz Airdrome, Fort Kaiser Alexander, Germany, 15 April 1919
- Colombey-les-Belles Airdrome, France, 17 May 1919
- France, April–July, 1919
- Mitchell Field, New York, July 1919

=== Enemy aircraft flown for evaluation ===
- Evaluated Fokker D.VII, Pfalz D.XII, Halberstadt and Rumpler aircraft, 1919

== See also ==
- Organization of the Air Service of the American Expeditionary Force
- List of American Aero Squadrons
