= 429th Attack Squadron =

429th Attack Squadron

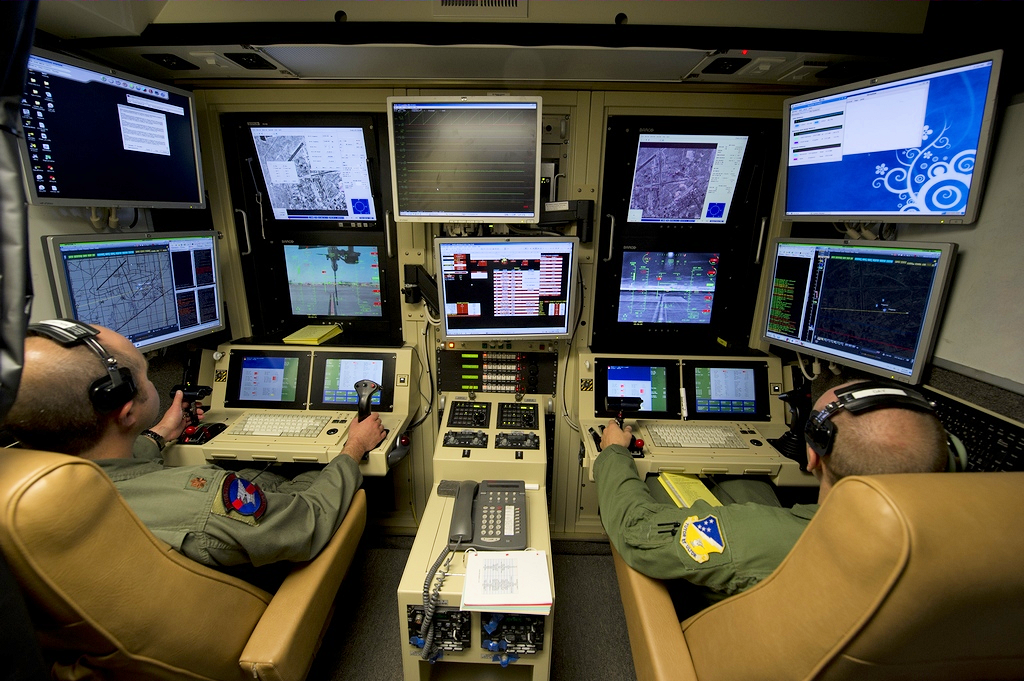
- Unmanned Aerial Vehicle trainer at Holloman Air Force Base
- Active: 1917–1919; 1922–1936; 1940–1946; 1958–1962; 2013–present
- Country: United States
- Branch: United States Air Force
- Role: Unmanned Aerial Vehicle Training
- Part of: Air Force Reserve Command
- Garrison/HQ: Holloman Air Force Base
- Engagements: World War I; Occupation of the Rhineland; World War II - EAME Theater

- Decorations: Distinguished Unit Citation (2x)

Insignia
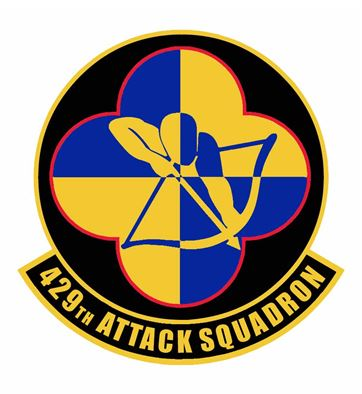
- 429th Attack Squadron emblem

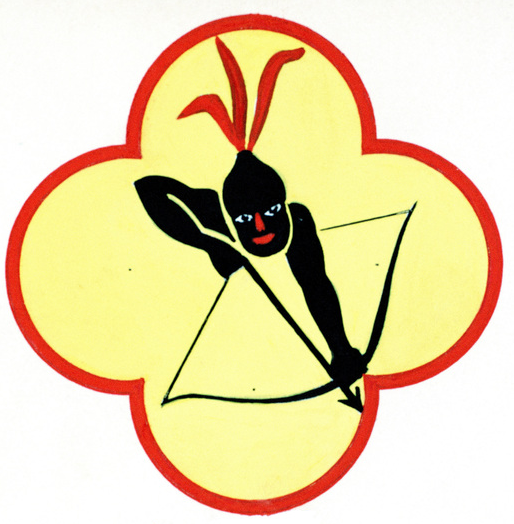
- 41st School Squadron emblem (Note: Approved 12 May 1930.)

The 429th Attack Squadron is a classic associate squadron, stationed at Holloman Air Force Base, New Mexico. It is geographically separated from its parent 926th Wing at Nellis Air Force Base, Nevada.

The squadron was previously the 429th Bombardment Squadron, a Boeing B-47 Stratojet unit based at Hunter Air Force Base, Georgia, where it was inactivated on 1 January 1962.

The squadron was first organized during World War I as the 41st Aero Squadron, and served in France during that war before being demobilized in 1919. In 1924 it was consolidated with the 41st School Squadron, which had been organized in 1922. The squadron later converted to the reconnaissance mission as the 41st Observation Squadron. During World War II, as the 429th Bombardment Squadron, it was a Boeing B-17 Flying Fortress squadron, assigned to the 2d Bombardment Group. It earned Two Distinguished Unit Citations while serving in the Mediterranean Theater of Operations, inactivating in Italy after the end of the war.

== Mission ==
The squadron's mission is to support three regular Air Force formal training squadrons with General Atomics MQ-9 Reaper instructor pilots, sensor operators and mission intelligence coordinators.

== History ==
=== World War I ===
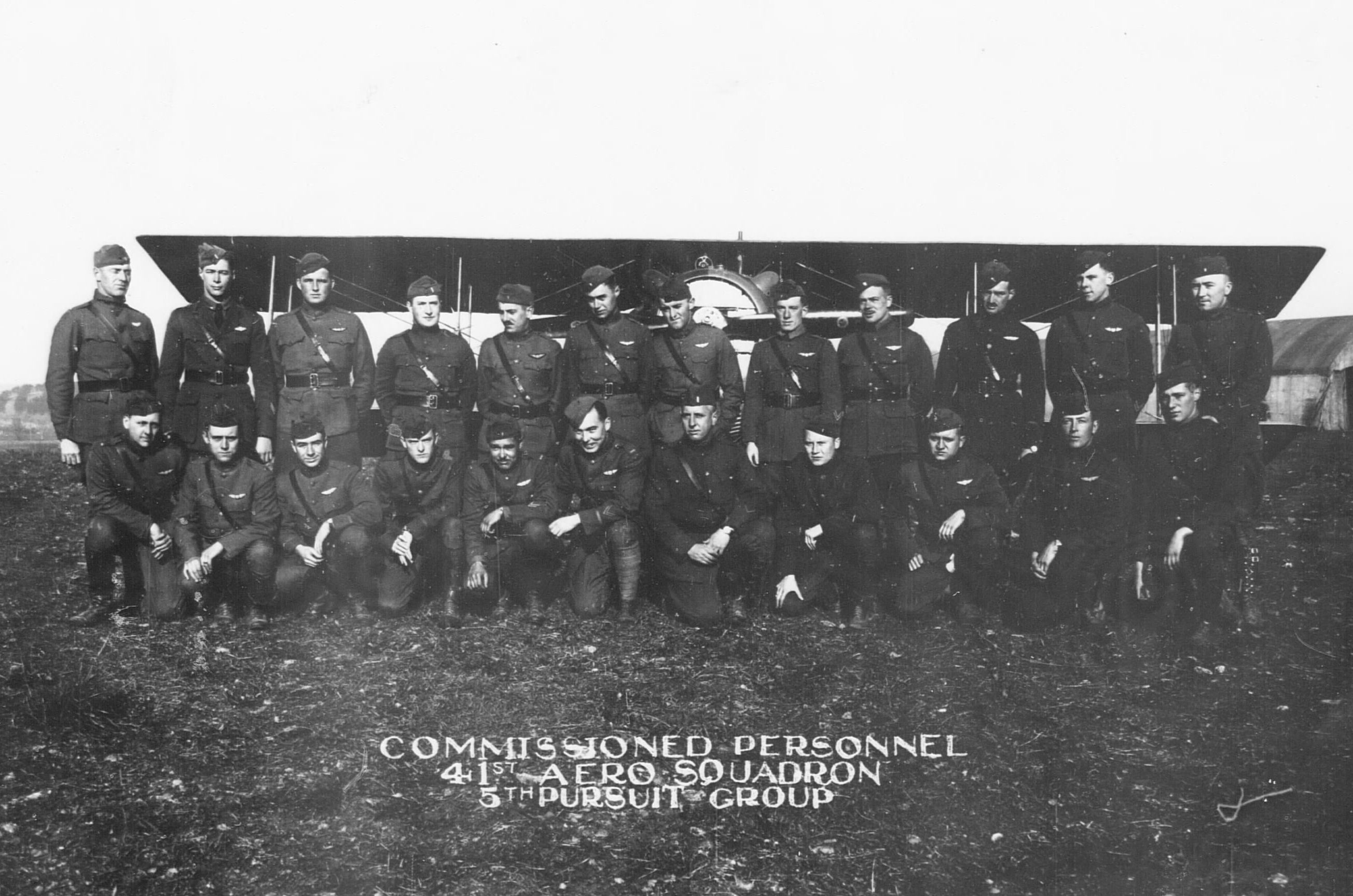
41st Aero Squadron formation-pilots, Lay-Saint-Remy Aerodrome, France, November 1919

The first predecessor of the squadron was established in June 1917 as the Air Service 41st Aero Squadron at Camp Kelly, Texas as part of the United States' mobilization after its entry into World War I. After several months of routine training and garrison duties, it deployed to Europe. The squadron trained with the Royal Flying Corps in Scotland from March to August 1918, then moved to France, and it became operationally ready as a pursuit squadron in the United States Second Army just as hostilities ceased in November 1918. It never saw action, but served with United States Third Army as part of the occupation forces, until May 1919. It returned to the United States in June 1919 and was demobilized in July.

=== Flying training ===
The second predecessor of the squadron was established in 1922 as the 41st Squadron (School), a pilot training squadron, at Kelly Field. It was renamed the 41st School Squadron the following year. The squadron taught basic flight training throughout the 1920s and early 1930s using a variety of trainers; switching to advanced flight training in 1931.

=== Reconnaissance ===
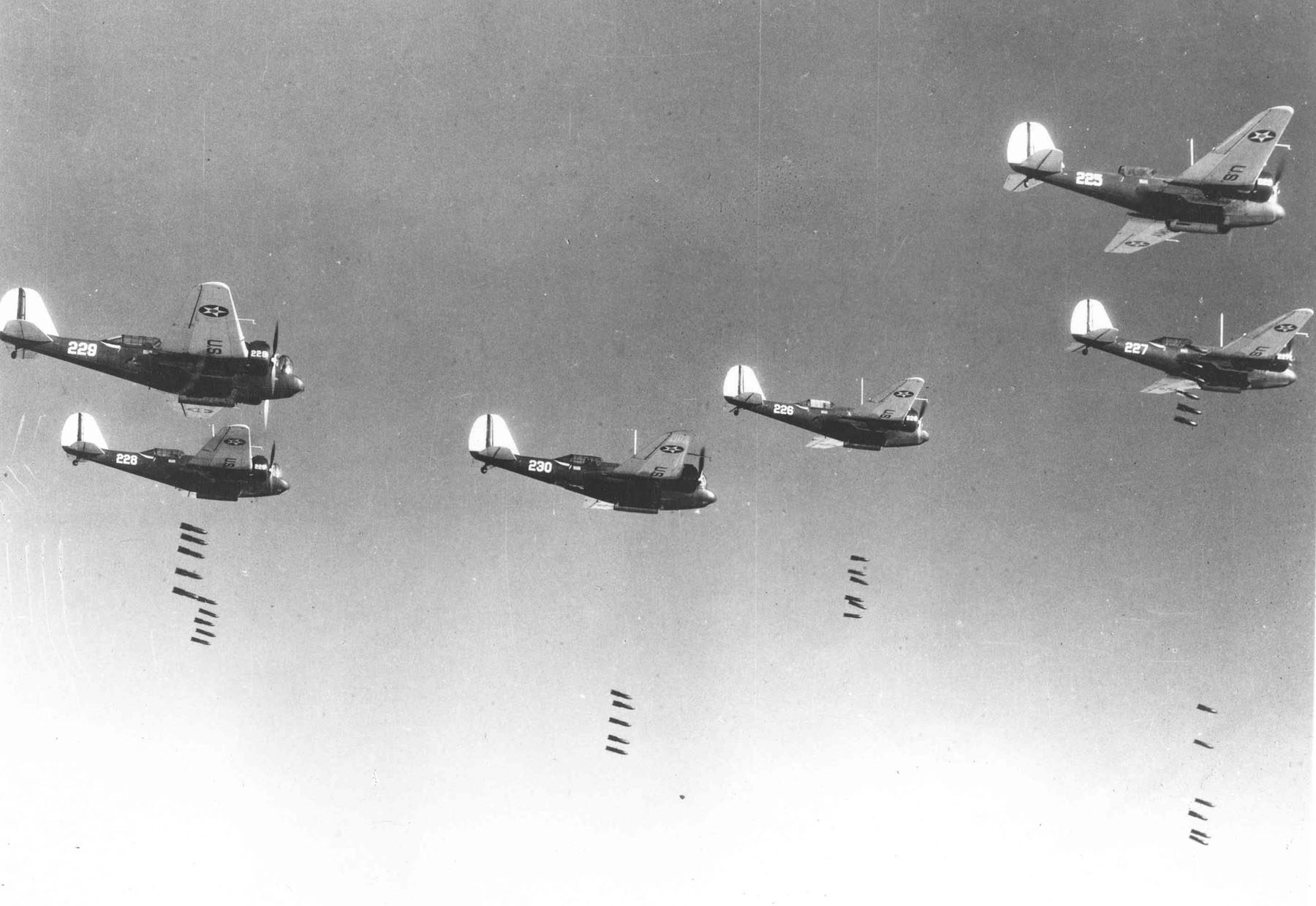
Martin B-10 bombers

In 1935 the squadron moved to Langley Field, Virginia, where it was redesignated the 41st Observation Squadron and was equipped with Martin B-10 bombers. It performed training flights primarily over the mid-Atlantic area. It later received Douglas B-18 Bolo medium bombers in 1937 and early-model Boeing B-17C Flying Fortress heavy bombers.

=== World War II ===
After the Pearl Harbor Attack, the squadron initially assigned to antisubmarine duty over the Atlantic Coast. In the spring of 1942, the squadron became the 429th Bombardment Squadron. It deployed in early 1943 to Twelfth Air Force in North Africa. The 429th engaged in long-range strategic bombing missions in the Mediterranean Theater of Operations until 1945. Missions flown included bombing such targets as marshalling yards, aerodromes, troop concentrations, bridges, docks, and shipping. The squadron participated in the defeat of Axis forces in Tunisia, April–May 1943; the reduction of Pantelleria and the preparations for the invasion of Sicily, in May through July 1943 and the invasion of Italy, September 1943.

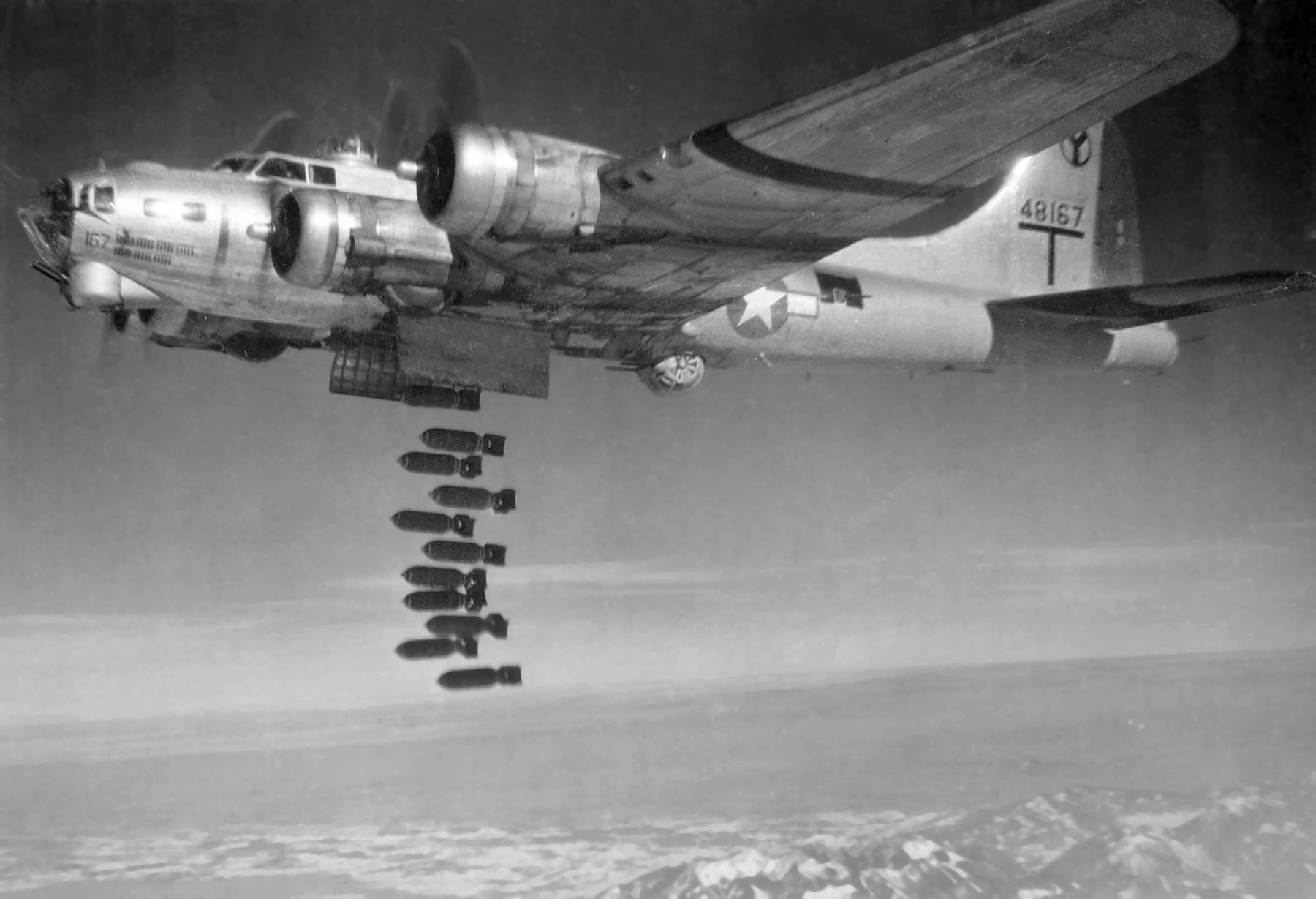
B-17G of the 2d Bombardment Group (Note: Aircraft is Lockheed-Vega built B-17G-50-VE Flying Fortress serial 44-8167.)

The squadron moved to Italy in December 1943 and continued operations as part of Fifteenth Air Force. Operated primarily from Amendola Airfield near Foggia. It engaged primarily in long-range bombardment of strategic targets in Germany, Poland, Czechoslovakia, Austria, Hungary, Yugoslavia, Rumania, and Greece. The 429th participated in the drive toward Rome from January through June 1944, the invasion of Southern France in August 1944, and the campaigns against German forces in northern Italy from June 1944 until May 1945. The squadron was inactivated in Italy in early 1946.

=== Strategic Air Command ===
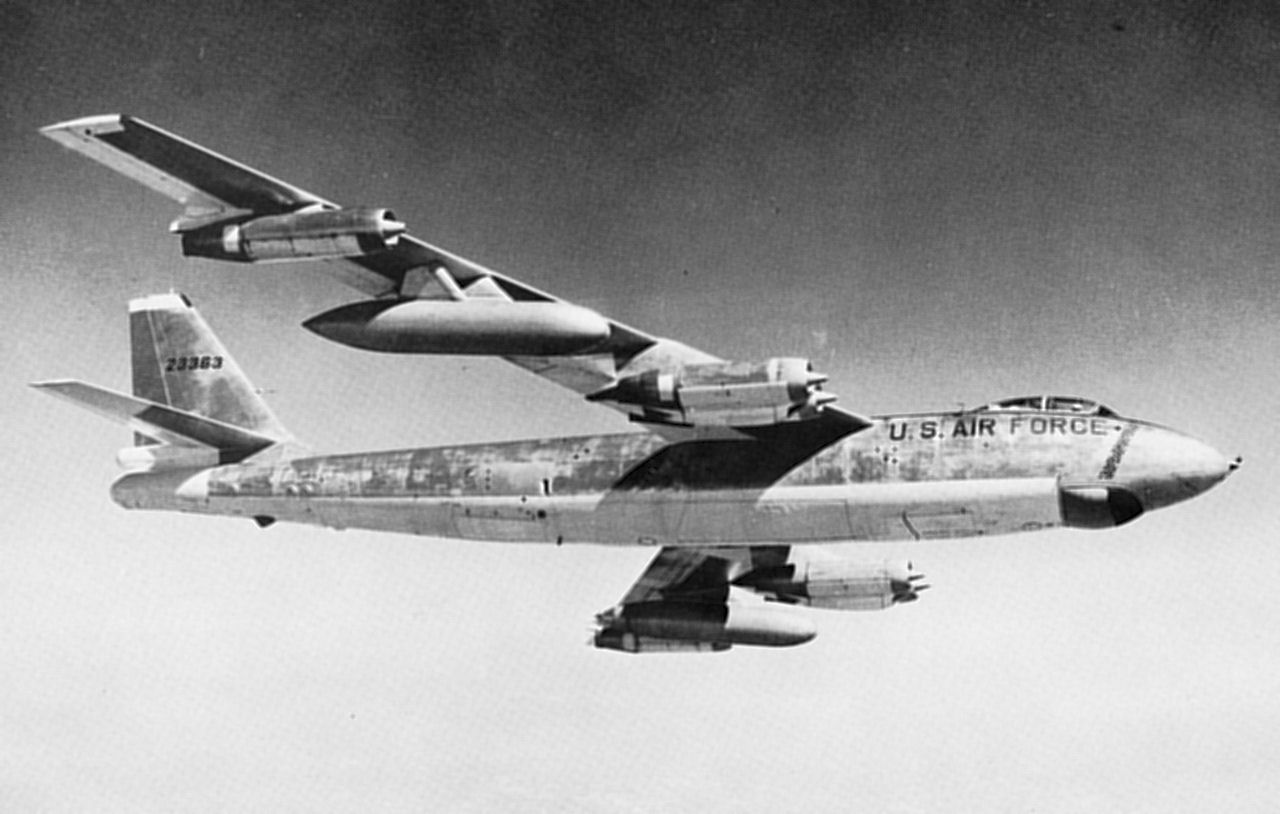
B-47E Stratojet stationed at Hunter AFB (Note: Aircraft is Lockheed built B-47E-50-LM Stratojet serial 52-3363 of the 2d Bombardment Wing, taken about 1960.)

From 1958, the Boeing B-47 Stratojet wings of Strategic Air Command (SAC) began to assume an alert posture at their home bases, reducing the amount of time spent on alert at overseas bases. The SAC alert cycle divided itself into four parts: planning, flying, alert and rest to meet General Thomas S. Power’s initial goal of maintaining one third of SAC's planes on fifteen minute ground alert, fully fueled and ready for combat to reduce vulnerability to a Soviet missile strike. To implement this new system B-47 wings reorganized from three to four squadrons. The 429th was activated at Hunter Air Force Base as the fourth squadron of the 2d Bombardment Wing. The alert commitment was increased to half the squadron's aircraft in 1962 and the four squadron pattern no longer met the alert cycle commitment, so the squadron was inactivated on 1 January 1962.

=== Reserve associate unit ===
The squadron was redesignated the 429th Air Combat Training Squadron and activated in the reserve at Holloman Air Force Base, New Mexico on 19 November 2013. It was redesignated 429th Attack Squadron on 24 October 2016. The squadron is an associate squadron, but unlike most associate units, is associated with three regular squadrons training with the MQ-9 remotely-piloted aircraft.

== Lineage ==
41st Aero Squadron

- Organized as the 41st Aero Squadron on 16 June 1917

Demobilized on 2 July 1919

- Reconstituted and consolidated with the 41st School Squadron on 8 April 1924

429th Attack Squadron

- Authorized as the 41st Squadron on 10 June 1922

Organized on 7 July 1922
Redesignated 41st School Squadron on 25 January 1923
Consolidated with the 41st Aero Squadron on 8 April 1924
Redesignated 41st Observation Squadron (Long Range, Amphibian) on 1 March 1935
Redesignated 41st Reconnaissance Squadron and inactivated on 1 September 1936

- Organized on 20 January 1937

Inactivated on 1 January 1938

- Redesignated 41st Reconnaissance Squadron (Long Range) on 22 December 1939

Activated on 1 February 1940
Redesignated 41st Reconnaissance Squadron (Heavy) on 20 November 1940
Redesignated 429th Bombardment Squadron (Heavy) on 22 April 1942
Redesignated 429th Bombardment Squadron, Heavy on 20 August 1943
Inactivated on 28 February 1946

- Redesignated 429th Bombardment Squadron, Medium on 11 August 1958

Activated on 1 October 1958
Discontinued and inactivated on 1 January 1962

- Redesignated 429th Air Combat Training Squadron

Activated on 19 November 2013
Redesignated 429th Attack Squadron on 24 October 2016

=== Assignments ===
- Post Headquarters, Kelly Field, 9 July 1917
- Post Headquarters, Selfridge Field, 28 August 1917
- Aviation Concentration Center, 2 February 1918
- Air Service Headquarters, American Expeditionary Force, British Isles (attached to the Royal Flying Corps (later Royal Air Force) for training), 10 March–8 August 1918
- Replacement Concentration Center, American Expeditionary Force, 22 August 1918
- Air Service Production Center No. 2, 5 September 1918
- 1st Air Depot, 18 September 1918
- 5th Pursuit Group, 15 November 1918
- 1st Air Depot, 12 May 1919
- Services of Supply, American Expeditionary Force, May–July 1919
- Eastern Department, July 1919
- 10th School Group, 7 July 1922
- Air Corps Advanced Flying School, 16 July 1931
- Eighth Corps Area, 20 January 1937 – 1 January 1938
- 2d Wing (attached to Air Corps Advanced Flying School), 1 March 1935 – 1 September 1936
- 2d Wing (later 2d Bombardment Wing), Attached 1 February 1940
- 2d Bombardment Group, attached c. December 1940, assigned 25 February 1942 – 28 February 1946 (attached to Newfoundland Base Command, 3 September 1941 – 29 October 1942)
- 2d Bombardment Wing, 1 October 1958 – 1 January 1962 (Note: This 2d Bombardment Wing was activated in 1947 and is not related to the 2d Bombardment Wing of 1940.)
- 926th Operations Group, 19 November 2013 – present

=== Stations ===
- Camp Kelly, Texas, 16 June 1917
- Selfridge Field, Michigan, 28 August 1917 – 2 February 1918
- Montrose, Scotland, 10 March 1918
- Gullane, Scotland, c. April–14 August 1918
- Romorantin Aerodrome, France, 29 August 1918
- Colombey-les-Belles Airdrome, France, 18 September 1918
- Lay-Saint-Remy Aerodrome, France, 15 November 1918
- Ourches Aerodrome, France, c. 30 November 1918
- Lay-Saint-Remy Aerodrome, France, c. 15 December 1918
- Coblenz, Germany, April 1919
- Colombey-les-Belles Aerodrome, France, May 1919-unknown
- Camp Lee, Virginia, 28 June–2 July 1919
- Kelly Field, Texas, 7 July 1922 – 1 September 1936
- Love Field, Texas, 20 January 1937 – 1 January 1938
- Langley Field, Virginia, 1 February 1940 – c. 23 August 1941
- Newfoundland Airport, Newfoundland, c. 28 August 1941
- Ephrata Army Air Base, Washington, 29 October 1942
- Cut Bank Army Air Field, Montana, 29 November 1942 – 13 March 1943
- Chateau-dun-du-Rhumel Airfield, Algeria, 27 April 1943
- Ain M'lila Airfield, Algeria, 18 June 1943
- Massicault Airfield, Tunisia, c. 1 August 1943
- Amendola Airfield, Italy, c. 9 December 1943
- Foggia Airfield, Italy, c. 20 October-28 February 1946
- Hunter Air Force Base, Georgia, 1 October 1958 – 1 January 1962
- Holloman Air Force Base, New Mexico, 19 November 2013 – present

=== Aircraft ===
- SPAD S.VII, 1918
- Sopwith Camel, 1918–1919
- Dayton-Wright DH-4, 1922–1928
- Curtiss A-3 Falcon, 1928–1935
- Thomas-Morse O-19, 1935–1936
- Douglas O-25, 1935–1936
- Douglas B-18 Bolo, 1940–1942
- Boeing XB-15, 1940–1942
- Grumman OA-9 Goose, 1940–1942
- Boeing B-17 Flying Fortress, 1940–1945
- Boeing B-47 Stratojet, 1958-1961
- General Atomics MQ-1 Predator, 2013–present
- General Atomics MQ-9 Reaper, 2013–present

== See also ==
- List of American Aero Squadrons
- Boeing B-17 Flying Fortress Units of the Mediterranean Theater of Operations
