= 41st Aero Squadron =

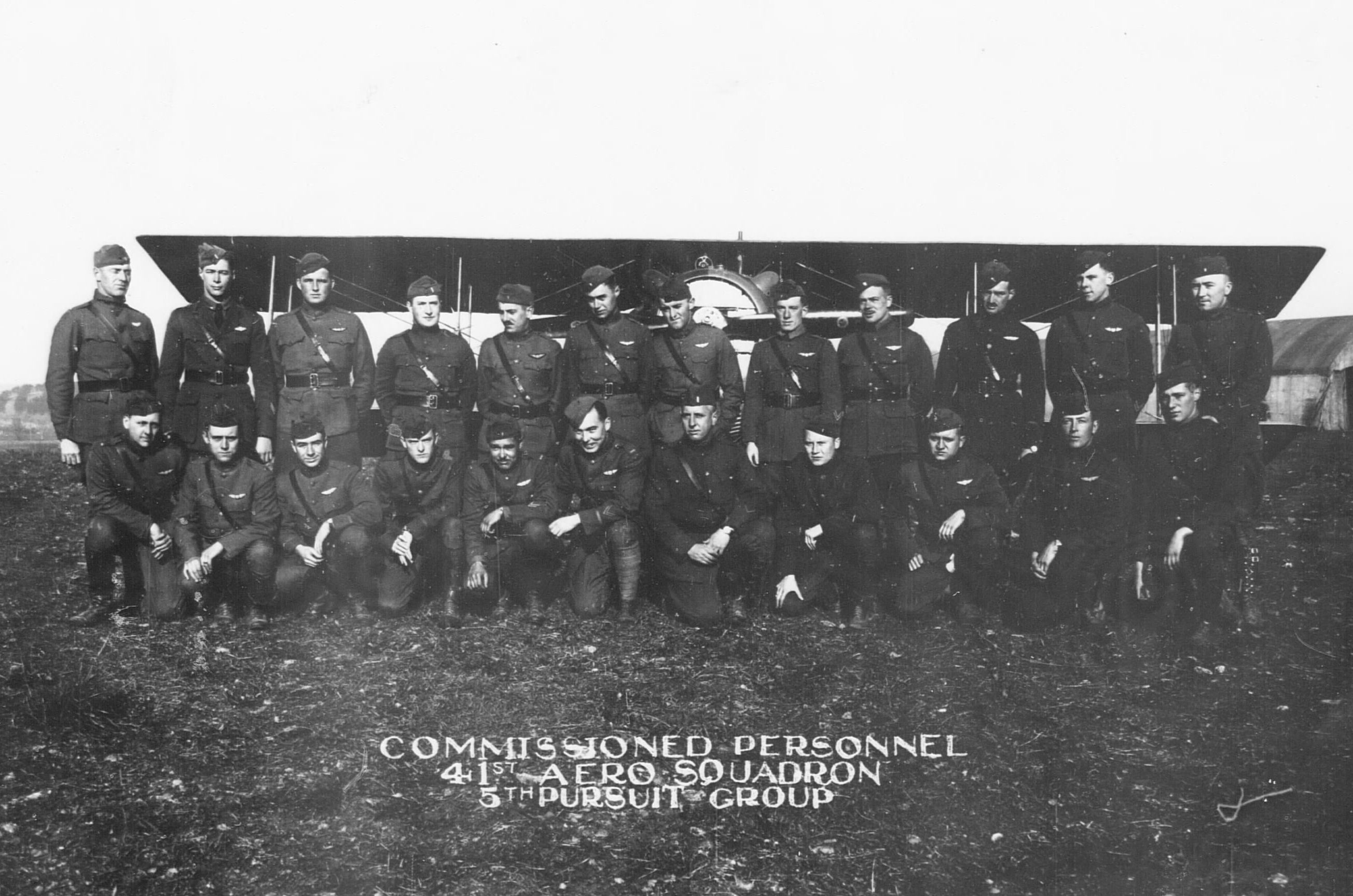
- Pilots of the 41st Aero Squadron, Lay-Saint-Remy Aerodrome, France, November 1919
- Active: 16 June 1917 – 2 July 1919
- Country: United States
- Branch: United States Army Air Service
- Type: Squadron
- Role: Pursuit
- Part of: American Expeditionary Forces (AEF)
- Engagements: World War I Occupation of the Rhineland

Commanders
- Notable commanders: Capt. Edward Buford

Insignia
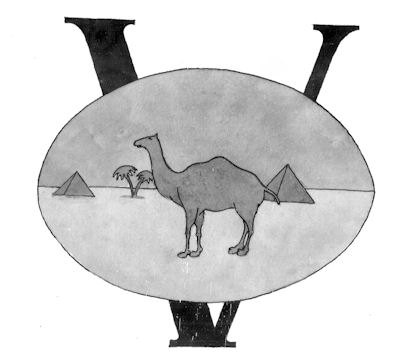
- 41st Aero Squadron Emblem

Aircraft flown
- Fighter: Sopwith Camel F.1, 1918–1919

Service record
- Operations: 5th Pursuit Group; Western Front, France: 29 October-11 November 1918; Not fully equipped at time of armistice, did not see any combat.

The 41st Aero Squadron was a United States Army Air Service unit that fought on the Western Front during World War I.

The squadron was assigned as a Day Pursuit (Fighter) Squadron as part of the 5th Pursuit Group, Second United States Army. Its mission was to engage and clear enemy aircraft from the skies and provide escort to reconnaissance and bombardment squadrons over enemy territory.

The squadron was never fully organized, and with Second Army's planned offensive drive on Metz cancelled due to the 1918 Armistice with Germany, the squadron was assigned to the United States Third Army as part of the Occupation of the Rhineland in Germany. It returned to the United States in July 1919 and was demobilized.

In 1924, the squadron was reconstituted and consolidated with the United States Army Air Service 41st Squadron. It was inactivated by the United States Air Force as the 429th Bombardment Squadron in 1962.

== History ==
The 41st Aero Squadron has its origins at the Signal Corps Barracks, Fort Leavenworth, Kansas. There, a squadron of 180 men was formed and sent to Kelly Field, Texas, arriving there on 5 July 1917. At this time, Kelly Field was a barren, unorganized post and over the next few days, the squadron was engaged in pitching tents, laying out streets, and policing the grounds. On 9 July, the squadron was officially recognized as the 41st Aero Squadron. The squadron was then engaged in close order infantry drill, construction and fatigue work.

On 25 August, the 41st was ordered to proceed to Selfridge Field, Michigan. Upon arrival on the 28th, the squadron was again engaged in construction work, instruction in the manual of arms, the study of aviation and a varying round of other duties. After an extended period of training, the squadron was ready to be sent overseas and was ordered to proceed to the Aviation Concentration Center, Garden City, Long Island on 2 February 1918. After just over a week, it moved to the Port of Entry, Hoboken, New Jersey for boarding on the RMS Carmania, leaving on 16 February, bound for Liverpool, England.

On 4 March, after arriving at Liverpool, the squadron was moved to the Romsey Rest Camp, Winchester, England where the squadron was assigned to the Royal Flying Corps (RFC) for combat training. The RFC sent the squadron to RFC Montrose, Scotland where it arrived on 10 March. It was the first American Air Service squadron to arrive in Scotland. From there, it was moved to RFC Gullane, Scotland, where the RFC had established a new flying field. About three weeks after arriving at Gullane, the RFC divided the squadron into two flights, and each flight was sent to a different station for training. After the first week, their total number of flying hours and total number of planes released from the Aero Repair began to exceed the amount of its British trainees.

Finally, on 14 August, fully trained and anxious to get to the front lines in France, orders were received for the squadron to report to the Replacement Concentration Center, AEF, at St. Maixent Replacement Barracks, France. Moving through Winchester, and Southampton, the squadron reached Cherbourg, France on the morning of 19 August. It reached St. Maixent on the 22d. There, the squadron was fully equipped with clothing and was mustered to full strength. The squadron then was ordered to Air Service Production Center No. 2, Romorantin Aerodrome. At Romorantin, the squadron was engaged in fatigue and garrison duties. On 18 September, it was again ordered to the 1st Air Depot, Colombey-les-Belles Airdrome, where it arrived on 18 September. There, gas masks were received and the squadron was fully trained in their use by experiencing the tear gas training class. It also was tasked for fatigue and garrison duties. However, the 41st Aero Squadron was designated as a Pursuit Squadron, and ordered to report to the 5th Pursuit Group, Second Army, which was being formed at Lay-Saint-Remy Aerodrome.

However, by the time the 41st reached Lay-Saint-Remy on 15 November, the Germans had agreed to an Armistice, and the squadron never engaged in active combat. In spite of the Armistice, the squadron was made ready for service by being equipped with British Sopwith Camel F.1 aircraft, and pilots were assigned.

=== Third Army of Occupation ===
Equipped with aircraft and pilots, the squadron engaged in flying flew proficiency flights, training in formation flying, patrols and in air combat being on the schedule each day the weather permitted, although all flying was performed in friendly territory. Also demonstration flying was performed for various events to thrill the crowd and to demonstrate to the other branches of the service the capabilities of the Air Service. The pilots were skilled in aerobatic flying, and no accidents ever resulted from an exhibition.

On 15 April 1919, orders were received that the Second Army Air Service was being demobilized. The entire 5th Pursuit Group was ordered to Coblenz, Germany to become part of the Third Army Air Service. The squadron prepared to move, and their equipment and supplies were moved the 200-odd miles in their own trucks. The enlisted personnel moved by rail and also by truck, while the pilots ferried their aircraft to their new airfield in the Rhineland.

The 41st made itself comfortable in Fort Kaiser Alexander, which was built by Wilhelm Hohenzollern's grandfather. The fort commanded a high ridge between the Rhine and Moselle rivers, overlooking the city. At Coblenz, the groups flew a mixture of their assigned aircraft, and also they were able to perform test flights on surrendered German aircraft. Flights of the Fokker D.VII, Pfalz D.XII, Halberstadts and Rumpler aircraft were made and evaluations were made.

=== Demobilization ===
The entire air service of the Third Army, excepting that of the III Corps Observation Group at Weißenthurm Airdrome, were relieved from further duty with the Third Army, on 12 May 1919 and ordered demobilized. The 41st Aero Squadron was ordered to proceed to the 1st Air Depot at Colombey-les-Belles Airdrome, France for subsequent demobilization. The squadron's Sopwith aircraft were delivered to the Air Service American Air Service Acceptance Park No. 1 at Orly Aerodrome to be returned to the British. There practically all of the pilots and observers were detached from the squadron.

Personnel at Colombey were subsequently assigned to the commanding general, services of supply, and ordered to report to one of several staging camps in France. There, personnel awaited scheduling to report to one of the base ports in France for transport to the United States, finally boarding a troop ship for the United States in late June. The 41st Aero Squadron arrived in New York Harbor in late June, and was sent to Camp Lee, Virginia where it was demobilized in early July 1919.

=== Lineage ===
- Organized as 41st Aero Squadron on 9 July 1917

Re-designated as 41st Aero Squadron (Pursuit) on 18 September 1918

- Demobilized on 2 July 1919

=== Assignments ===
- Post Headquarters, Kelly Field, 9 July 1917
- Post Headquarters, Selfridge Field, 28 August 1917
- Aviation Concentration Center, 2 February 1918
- Air Service Headquarters, AEF, British Isles

Attached to the Royal Flying Corps for training, 10 March-18 August 1918

- Replacement Concentration Center, AEF, 22d August 1918
- Air Service Production Center No. 2, 5 September 1918
- 1st Air Depot, 18 September 1918
- 5th Pursuit Group, 15 November 1918
- 1st Air Depot, 12 May 1919
- Commanding General, Services of Supply, May–July 1919
- Eastern Department, July 1919

=== Stations ===
- Kelly Field, Texas, 9 July 1917
- Selfridge Field, Michigan, 28 August 1917
- Aviation Concentration Center, Garden City, New York, 2 February 1918
- Port of Entry, Hoboken, New Jersey, 15 February 1918

Overseas transport: RMS Carmania, 16 February – 4 March 1918

- Romsey Rest Camp, Winchester, England, 4 March 1918
- RFC Montrose, Scotland, 10 March 1918
- RFC Gullane, Scotland, 1 April 1918
- Cherbourg, France, 19 August 1918
- St. Maixent Replacement Barracks, France, 22 August 1918
- Romorantin Aerodrome, France, 5 September 1918
- Colombey-les-Belles Airdrome, France, 18 September 1918
- Lay-Saint-Remy Aerodrome, France, 15 November 1918
- Coblenz Airdrome, Fort Kaiser Alexander, Germany, 15 April 1919
- Colombey-les-Belles Airdrome, France, 17 May 1919
- France, April–June 1919
- Camp Lee, Virginia, 28 June-2 July 1919

== See also ==
- Organization of the Air Service of the American Expeditionary Force
- List of American aero squadrons
