= Lay-Saint-Remy Aerodrome =

Former French WWI airfield

- Part of American Expeditionary Forces (AEF)
- Located near: Lay-Saint-Remy, France
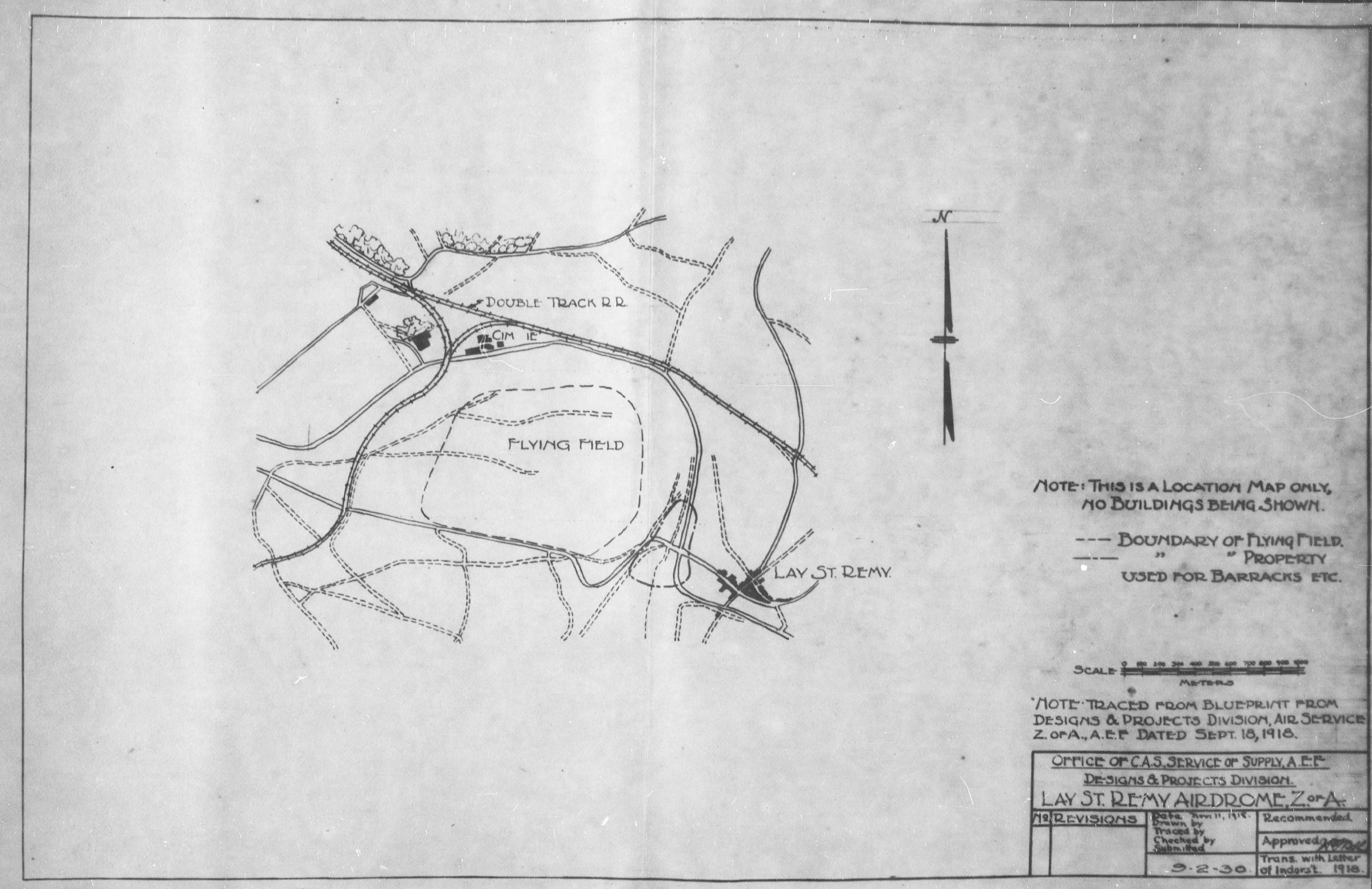
- Air Service engineering site map for Lay-Saint-Remy Aerodrome

Site information
- Type: Combat Airfield
- Controlled by: Air Service, United States Army
- Condition: Agricultural area

Location
- Location within France
- Coordinates: 48°41′12″N 005°44′46″E

Site history
- Built: 1918
- In use: 1918–1919
- Battles/wars: World War I

Garrison information
- Garrison: 5th Pursuit Group; United States First Army Air Service

Lay-Saint-Remy Aerodrome, was a temporary World War I airfield in France, used by the Air Service, United States Army. It was located 0.7 miles (1.1 km) West-Northwest of the commune of Lay-Saint-Remy, in the Meurthe-et-Moselle department in north-eastern France.

== Overview ==
The airfield was built at the end of the summer of 1918 and allocated to the Second Army Air Service for combat operations during a planned drive against Metz in the fall. The first unit to reach the field was 138th Aero Squadron - ready to be part of the newly formed 5th Pursuit Group, but as a result of the 11 November armistice, it did not see any combat operations. Subsequently, the HQ and the two other squadrons (41st and 638th) of the 5th Pursuit Group arrived on 14–15 November, flying non-combat operations from the field.

From Lay-Saint-Remy, the squadrons moved to Coblenz Airdrome, Fort Kaiser Alexander, in April 1919, as part of the Third Army of Occupation, and the aerodrome was turned over to the French Government, to be returned to agricultural use.

The map, taken from Gorrell's papers, shows that the airfield was located on the plateau west of Lay Saint Remy.

== Known units assigned ==
- 5th Pursuit Group HQ, 15 November 1918 – 15 April 1919
- 138th Aero Squadron (Pursuit), 5 November 1918 – 15 April 1919
- 41st Aero Squadron (Pursuit) 15 November 1918 – 15 April 1919
- 638th Aero Squadron (Pursuit), 14–30 November 1918 – 15 April 1919

== See also ==
- List of Air Service American Expeditionary Force aerodromes in France
