= 5th Pursuit Group =

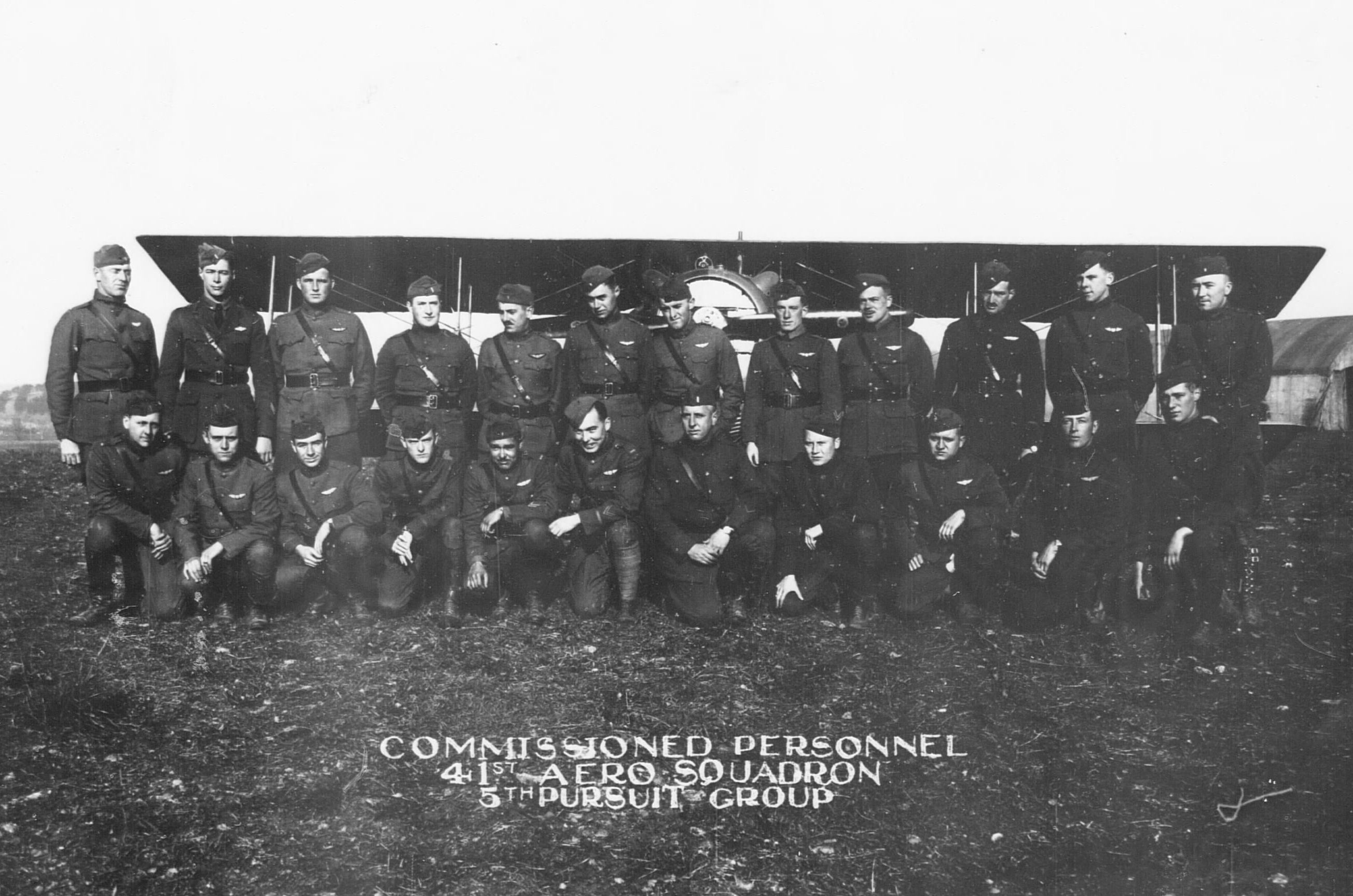
- Pilots of the 41st Aero Squadron, Lay-Saint-Remy Aerodrome, France, November 1919
- Active: 1918-19
- Country: United States
- Branch: Air Service, United States Army
- Type: Group
- Role: Command and Control
- Part of: American Expeditionary Forces (AEF)
- Engagements: World War I Occupation of the Rhineland

Insignia
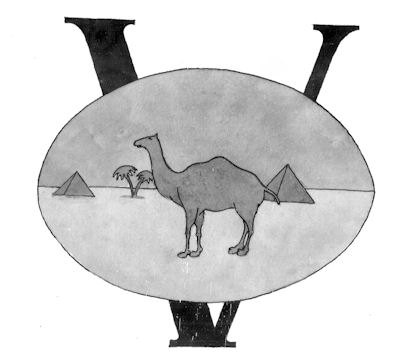
- 41st Aero Squadron Emblem

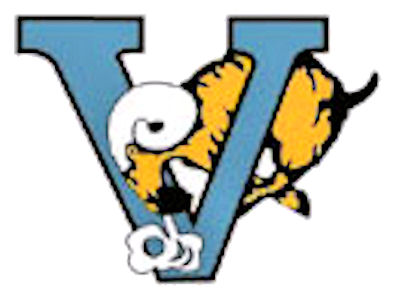
- 138th Aero Squadron Emblem

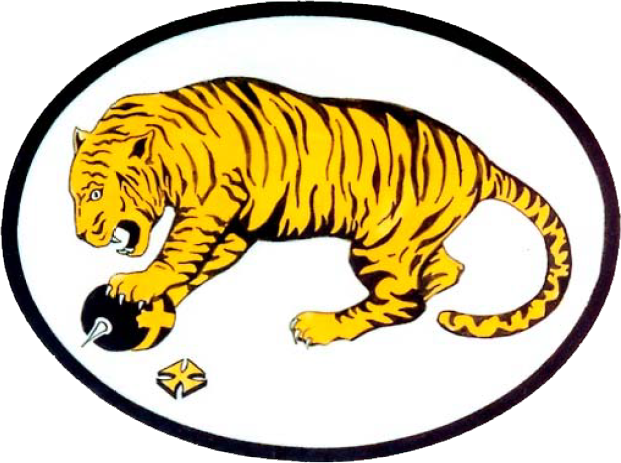
- 141st Aero Squadron Emblem

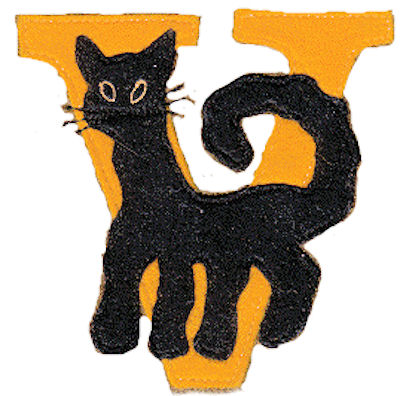
- 638th Aero Squadron Emblem

The 5th Pursuit Group was an Air Service, United States Army unit that was assigned to the American Expeditionary Forces during World War I. It was demobilized in Germany after serving with the Third Army Air Service as part of the American Occupation of the Rhineland in May, 1919. There is no modern United States Air Force unit that shares its lineage and history.

== History ==
The 5th Pursuit Group was authorized by the Second Army Air Service in October 1918, for the purpose of participating in the planned drive on Metz and subsequent offenses. However, the signing of the Armistice with Germany on 11 November intervened.

Officially organized on 15 November 1918, initially, the 41st, 138th and 638th Aero Squadrons (Pursuit) were assigned to the group, and were billeted in the village of Lay St. Remy, in the Toul Sector; the 94th Squadron joined on 20 November. The airfield was located only about a dozen kilometers from the town. Within several weeks after the group's formation, barracks were completed near the field and the squadron's men were moved to the quarters. Many of the pilots of the group had seen service with the British Royal Flying Corps, and a few had been shot down over German-held territory and had been taken prisoner. Also, several of the pilots were instructors in the United States and were sent overseas late in the war, and had not seen combat. Also many of the men of the squadrons had been instructors at training fields both in the United States, as well as in England and Scotland.

Although the group was formed after the Armistice with Germany, flying did not cease. Pilots flew proficiency flights, training in formation flying, patrols and in air combat being on the schedule each day the weather permitted, although all flying was performed in friendly territory. Also demonstration flying was performed for various events to thrill the crowd and to demonstrate to the other branches of the service the capabilities of the Air Service. The pilots were skilled in aerobatic flying, and no accidents ever resulted from an exhibition.

High-ranking officers would visit Lay-Saint-Remy Aerodrome on occasion to discuss their cooperation with the Air Service during the War, and on their own particular work. Courses were held for the enlisted men in maintaining their skills learned and updating them with experiences learned during the war.

By 1919, the rough, barren airdrome had been transformed by much hard work, into one of the showplaces of the Second Army Air Service. Colonel Frank P. Lahm, Chief of Air Service, Second Army, remarked in a talk to the officers of the group that the station compared most favorably with a Regular Army post in the United States during peacetime. A fully equipped Officer's Club (The "Side Slip Inn") was one of the best-equipped and prettiest places to be found in France, and it was here that the officers of the group entertained the many high-ranking visitors.

On 15 April 1919, orders were received that the Second Army Air Service was being demobilized. The entire 5th Pursuit Group but the 94th was ordered to Coblenz, Germany to become part of the Third Army Air Service. Just before this, the group had been reviewed by General Pershing and General Patrick, Chief of Air Service, AEF. The group was informed that the 141st Aero Squadron would be joining it at Coblenz. Each squadron prepared to move, and their equipment and supplies were moved the 200-odd miles in their own trucks. The enlisted personnel moved by rail and also by truck, while the pilots ferried their aircraft to their new airfield in the Rhineland.

The group made itself comfortable in Fort Kaiser Alexander, which was built by Wilhelm Hohenzollern's grandfather. The Fort commanded a high ridge between the Rhine and Moselle rivers, overlooking the city. There it was also joined by the 3d Air Park, its primary support unit that completed the organization of the group. At Coblenz, the groups flew a mixture of their assigned aircraft, and also they were able to perform test flights on surrendered German aircraft. Flights of the Fokker D.VII, Pfalz D.XII, Halberstadts and Rumpler aircraft were made and evaluations were made.

The entire air service of the Third Army, excepting that of the III Corps Observation Group at Weißenthurm Airdrome, were relieved from further duty with the Third Army, on 12 May 1919 and ordered demobilized. The 5th Pursuit Group component squadrons were ordered to proceed to the 1st Air Depot at Colombey-les-Belles Airdrome, France for subsequent demobilization.

=== Lineage ===
- Organized as 5th Pursuit Group, 15 November 1918

Demobilized on 12 May 1919

=== Assignments ===
- Second Army Air Service, 15 November 1919
- Third Army Air Service, 15 April – 12 May 1919

=== Components ===
- 41st Aero Squadron (Pursuit), 15 November 1918 – 12 May 1919
- 138th Aero Squadron (Pursuit), 15 November 1918 – 12 May 1919
- 141st Aero Squadron (Pursuit), 15 April – 12 May 1919
- 638th Aero Squadron (Pursuit), 15 November 1918 – 12 May 1919

=== Stations ===
- Lay-Saint-Remy Aerodrome, France, 15 November 1918
- Coblenz Airdrome, Fort Kaiser Alexander, Germany, 15 April – 12 May 1919

== See also ==
- Organization of the Air Service of the American Expeditionary Force
