= Third Army Air Service =

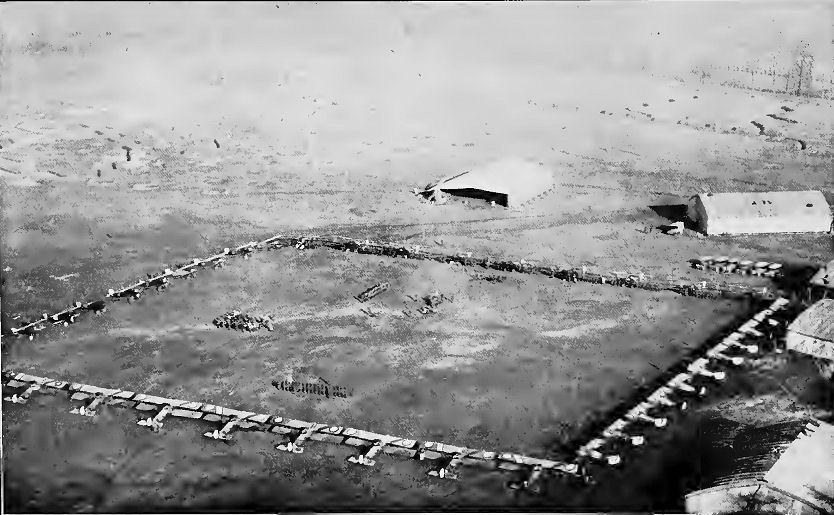
- Formation of IV Corps Observation Group aircraft, Coblenz Airdrome, Fort Kaiser Alexander, Germany in January 1919.
- Active: 14 November 1918 – 2 July 1919
- Country: United States
- Branch: Air Service, United States Army
- Type: Air Service
- Role: Command and Control
- Part of: American Expeditionary Forces (AEF)
- Engagements: Occupation of the Rhineland (World War I)

The Third Army Air Service was a United States Army Air Service organization stationed in France and Occupied Germany in the immediate aftermath of World War I. It was demobilized in Germany on 2 July 1919. There is no modern United States Air Force unit that shares its lineage and history.

== History ==
=== Organization ===
The command was established on 14 November 1918 by Brigadier General William Mitchell, who was appointed as Commander, Third Army Air Service. The command was organized as part of the United States Third Army for the occupation of German Territory west of the Rhine River as agreed under the terms of the 11 November Armistice with Germany.

The Headquarters staff was originally organized about 15 October when about half dozen officers and some twenty enlisted men were withdrawn from Headquarters Detachment of the First Army Air Service at Souilly Aerodrome, France and used as a nucleus upon to build up a staff for a planned Army Group. The Army Group was planned as a Headquarters for both the First and Second Army Air Services. With the Armistice with Germany ending combat on 11 November, and the formation of Third Army, the staff was re-designated as the Third Army Air Service. Once formed, the staff moved from Souilly to Ligny-en-Barrois, France on 14 November.

A few days after the arrival of the staff at Ligny, a carload of necessary office supplies, equipment and other necessities began to arrive which enabled the command to begin operations. Everything was prepared for an extended move into Germany, and on 21 November, orders were received to move to Longuyon, France. The Headquarters began its trip into Germany, arriving at Longuyon on the 22d. Owing to the terms that no Allied troops would cross into Germany until 1 December, on 5 December orders were received to move the Headquarters to Euren, a suburb of Trier, Germany. The truck train route taken took the Headquarters though Luxembourg. Quarters in Euren consisted of several old German Barracks, and the offices were set up in one of the barracks. The facilities were very unkempt and in a filthy condition, and it was necessary to send an advance detail to clean the facilities.

Lastly, on 16 December, orders were received for Headquarters to proceed to Coblenz. On the morning of the 18th, a truck train of eight trucks began the move. It was hoped to make the trip in one day, however considerable difficulties were encountered on the road, and the convoy did not arrive in Coblenz until the evening of the 19th.

=== Initial operations ===
Upon the command's arrival in Germany, an airfield was constructed on the former parade ground of Fort Kaiser Alexander for aircraft squadrons being assigned to Coblenz. The former Deutsche Luftstreitkräfte (German Air Force) aerodromes at Trier and Weißenthurm were also taken over by the Command.

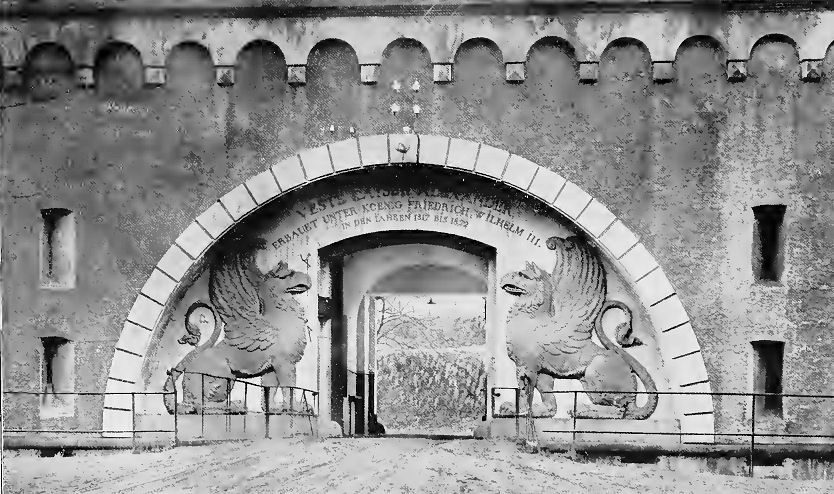
Lion's Gate Entrance to Fort Kaiser Alexander

Initial Observation units assigned to the Headquarters were the 1st Aero Squadron at Weißenthurm, the 12th Aero Squadron at Coblenz, and the 88th Aero Squadron at Trier. These units were initially ordered to photograph the entire corps area, including interesting features of the terrain, cities and towns, the road and railroad network and any such points as Headquarters may designated. The 94th Aero Squadron (Pursuit) and 166th Aero Squadron (Bombardment), both at Coblenz were ordered to carry out "show of force" formations over the Third Army area. Whenever possible, large formations of aircraft were to fly low over cities and towns, but no lower than 500m altitude. Acrobatic and stunt flying was to be avoided. The 9th Aero Squadron (Night Observation) was assigned as a courier squadron for the Commander of Third Army.

An extensive training program was organized in Aerial photography, infantry liaison, artillery adjustments, machine guns, infantry drill regulations, map reading and the study of photographs, lectures on the cooperation of aviation with the other branches of the Army. Practice flights included long-distance cross country, photographic missions, formation flying and also, the flying of German aircraft obtained and evaluation of their capabilities and other aspects of their construction.

The VII Corps Observation Group established an infantry liaison school at Trier in January 1919. The mission of the school was to train infantry units in displaying panels by the front line troops, the use of pyrotechnics as employed to signal from the ground to aircraft and from the aircraft to the ground. Artillery units were trained in the use of aircraft for adjusting barrages. As many officers and non-commissioned officers as possible were taken up in airplanes to view the exercises. Radio officers were taken up to perform duties in actual exercises.

=== Realignment and demobilization ===
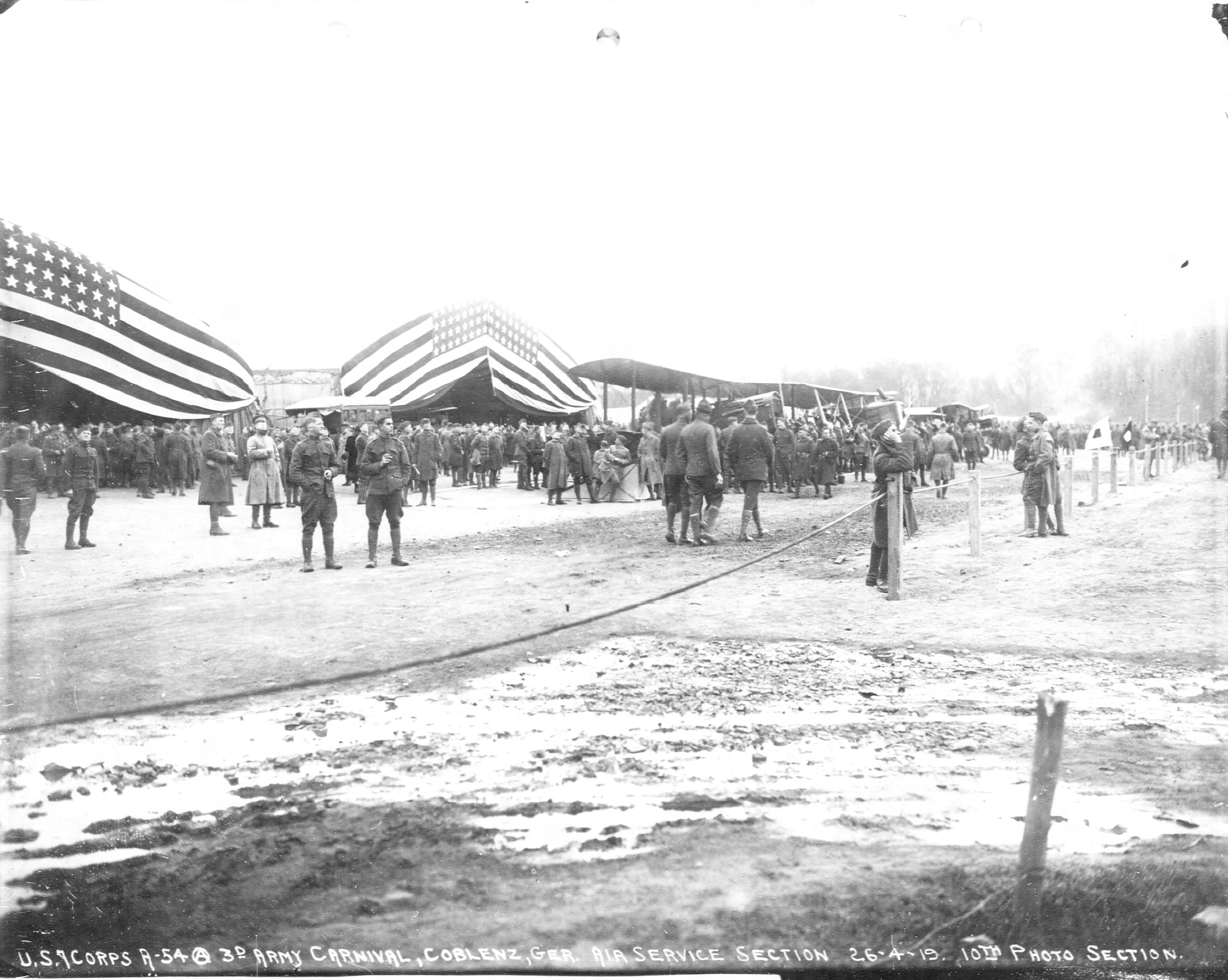
Hangars and aircraft on display at the Coblenz Aviation Show, April 1919

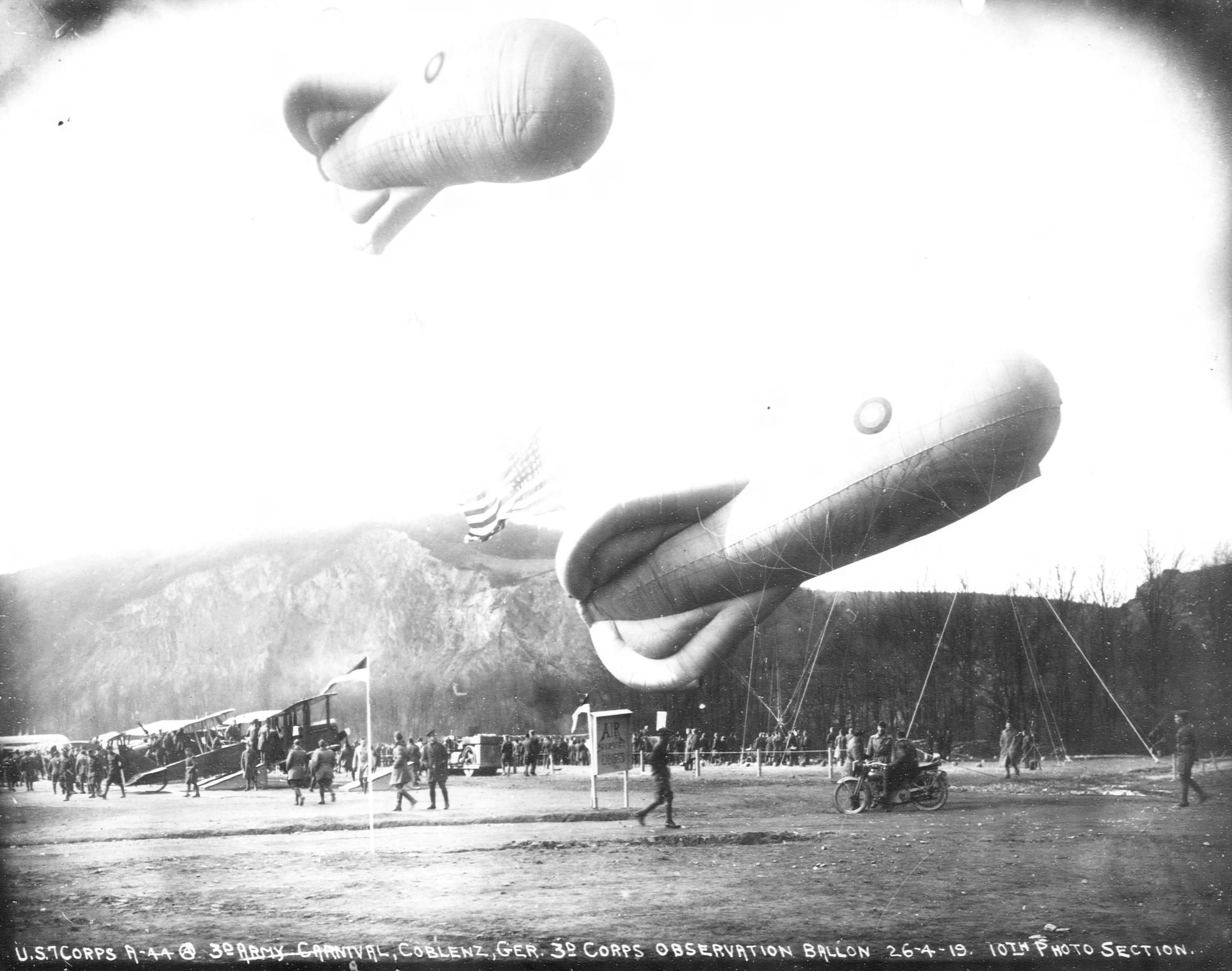
Observation Balloon demonstration at the Coblenz Aviation Show

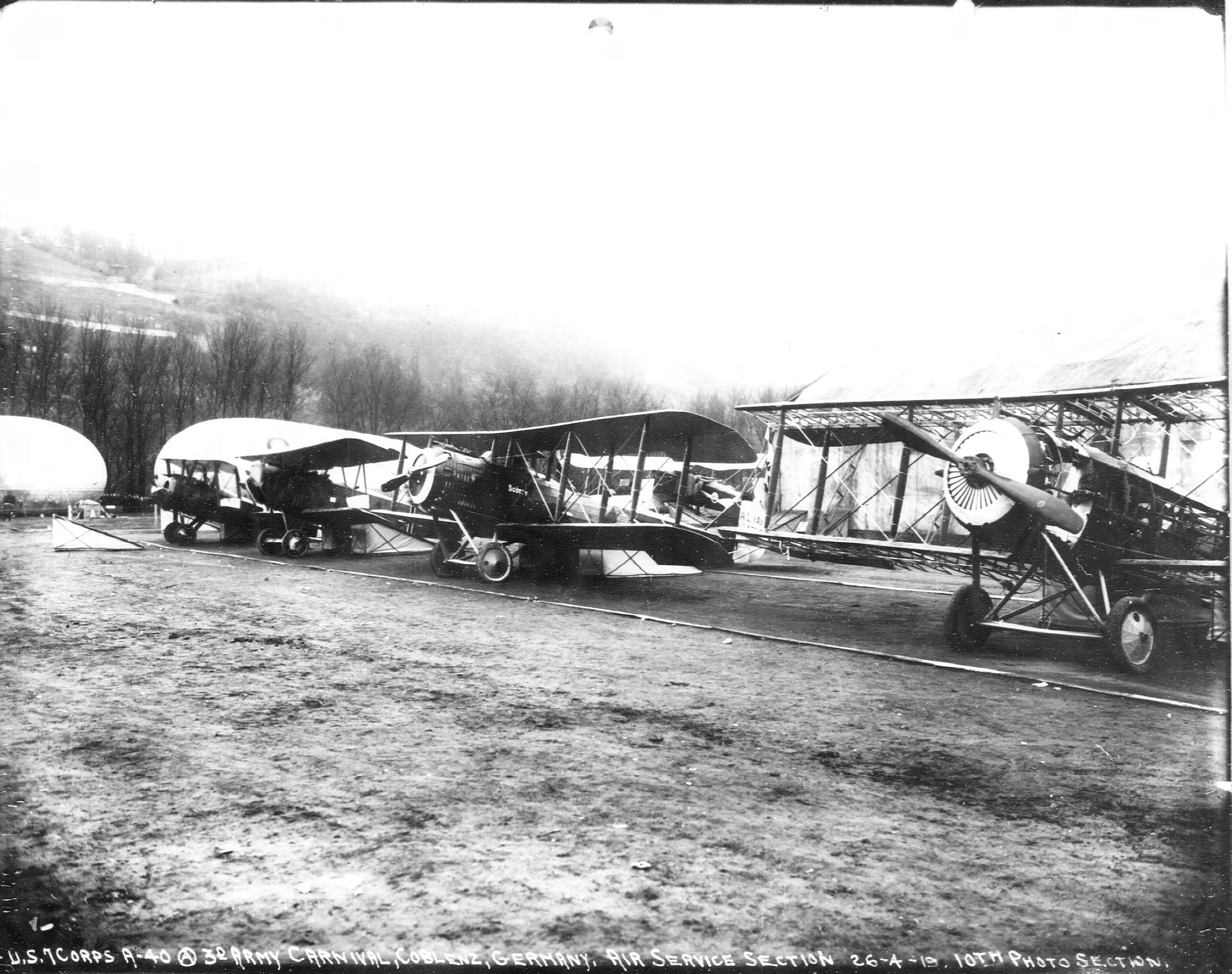
1st Aero Squadron Salmson 2A2 planes on display at the Coblenz Aviation Show

On 7 April the construction of a new aerodrome at Sinzing was commenced to take care of additional squadrons moving in from the First and Second Armies in France, and for that same reason, the aerodrome at Weißenthurm was expanded. Also plans were made to place a main Supply Depot adjacent to the airfield at Weißenthurm.

The next day, 8 April 1919, with the pending assignment of replacement units from France, the 12th, 91st, 94th and 166th Aero Squadrons were relieved from duty with the Third AS and on 16 April ordered to proceed to the Services of Supply 1st Air Depot at Colombey-les-Belles Airdrome, France, for immediate demobilization and return to the United States.

With the demobilization of the First and Second Army Air Services on 15 April, additional squadrons were transferred to Third Army to supplement units already in Germany. The 5th Pursuit Group, formerly of Second Army in France was moved to Coblenz, and the IV Corps Observation Group was moved to the new Aerodrome at Sinzig. There, IV Corps was to establish a Liaison School, modeled on the one operating by VII Corps at Trier. Other new units assigned to the Third Army AS were the 166th, 24th and 256th Aero Squadrons to the III Corps, and the 278th and 354th AS to IV Corps.

Between 23 and 27 April, the Third Army held a Horse-Motor and Aviation Show at Coblenz. The Air Service took a large part, putting on both air and Ground exhibitions. Pursuit, Observation, Day Bombardment, and Aerial Reconnaissance planes were placed on display, all fully equipped for duty over the lines. Also a Radio Section was on display showing the methods of liaison from ground to air and air to ground employed by the Air Service during the War. Other displays presented were from the Armament Section, with a full display of munitions and other pyrotechnics; various aircraft engines, aerial cameras, and a Balloon Exhibit of lighter-than-air observation craft. Pursuit plane races, message dropping contests, the winner being the one dropping a message from an aircraft closest to a panel, and a demonstration of aerobatic stunt flying by members of the Air Service.

The show was attended by several thousand Air Service personnel, members of Third Army and also, and most importantly, members of the general public, who saw the capabilities of the Air Service on display. The walls, ceilings, and fronts of two aircraft hangars used for the exhibits were completely covered by large U.S. Flags. An orchestra furnished music both mornings and afternoons.

However, the entire Third Army Air Service, excepting that of the III Corps 138th Aero Squadron, one air park, and one construction squadron were relieved from further duty with the Third Army on 12 May 1919, and ordered to proceed to the 1st Air Depot at Colombey, France, for demobilization. The 138th was reassigned to Air Service HQ and took over the courier and liaison duties of the 9th Aero until the entire Third Army Air Service Headquarters itself was demobilized on 2 July 1919.

=== Lineage ===
- Organized in France as: Third Army Air Service, on 14 November 1918

Demobilized on 2 July 1919

=== Assignments ===
- United States Third Army, 14 November 1918 – 2 July 1919

=== Components ===
- 5th Pursuit Group, 15 April – 12 May 1919

Coblenz Airdrome, Fort Kaiser Alexander
138th Aero Squadron relieved on 1 July 1919

- III Corps Observation Group, 21 November 1918 – 12 May 1919

Weißenthurm Airdrome

- IV Corps Observation Group, 21 November 1918 – 12 May 1919

Coblenz Airdrome until 15 April, then Sinzig Airdrome

- VII Corps Observation Group, 22 November 1918 – 12 May 1919

Trier Airdrome

=== Headquarters ===
- Ligny-en-Barrois, France, 14 November 1918
- Longuyon, France, 22 November 1918
- Euren, near Trier Airdrome, Germany 8 December 1918
- Coblenz Airdrome, Fort Kaiser Alexander, Germany, 19 December 1918 – 2 July 1919

== See also ==
- Organization of the Air Service of the American Expeditionary Force
