= Lay-Saint-Remy =

- Commune
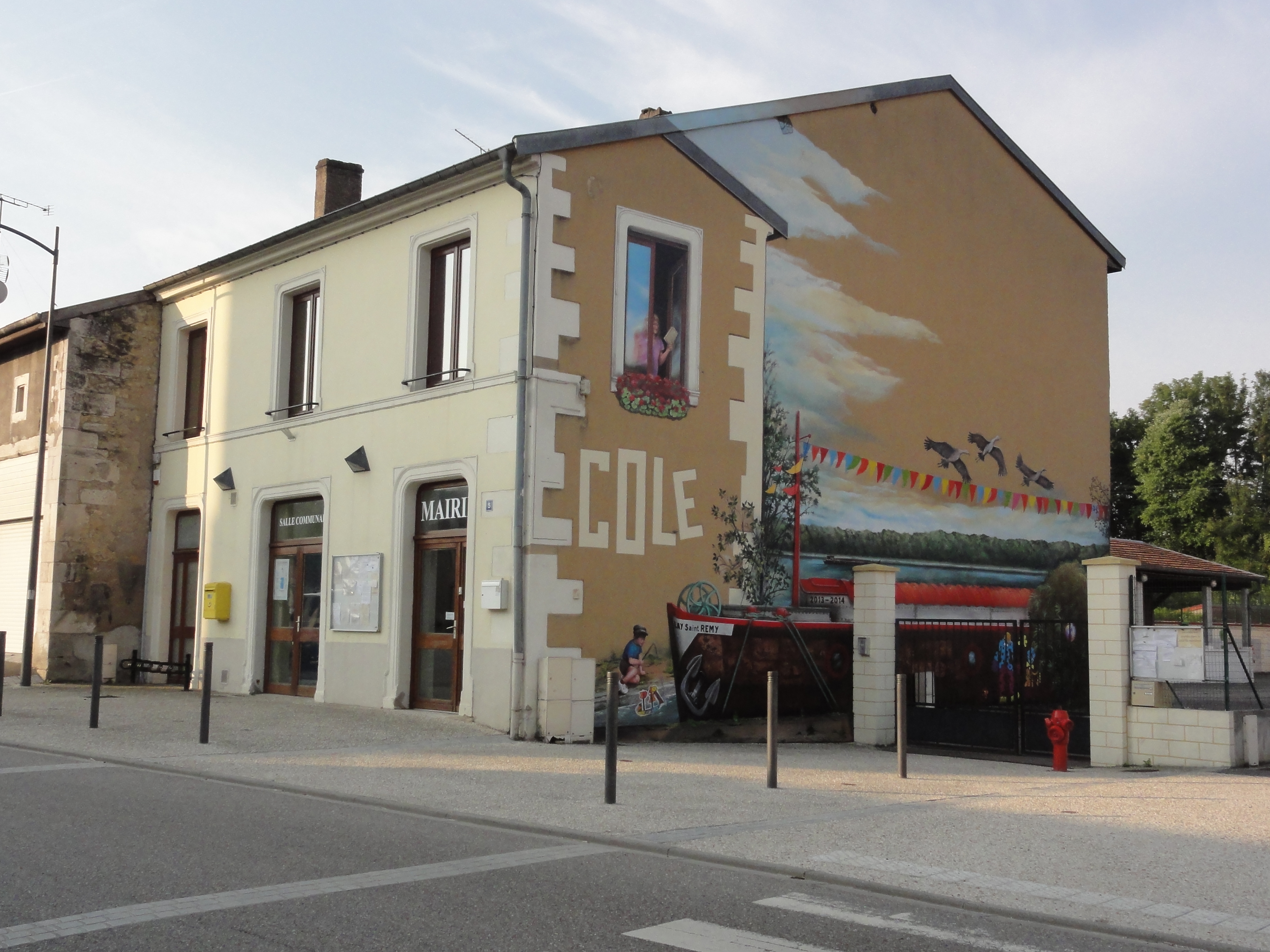
- The town hall and school in Lay-Saint-Remy

- Coat of arms
- Location of Lay-Saint-Remy
- Location within France Location within Grand Est
- Coordinates: 48°40′52″N 5°45′47″E
- Country: France
- Region: Grand Est
- Department: Meurthe-et-Moselle
- Arrondissement: Toul
- Canton: Toul
- Intercommunality: Terres Touloises

Government
  - Mayor (2023–2026): Thierry Mansuy
- Area^{1}: 3.8 km^{2} (1.5 sq mi)
- Elevation: 253 m (830 ft)
- Highest elevation: 335 m (1,099 ft)
- Lowest elevation: 246 m (807 ft)
- Population (2023): 340
  - Density: 89/km^{2} (230/sq mi)
- Time zone: UTC+01:00 (CET)
  - Summer (DST): UTC+02:00 (CEST)
- INSEE/Postal code: 54306 /54570
- ^{1} French Land Register data, which excludes lakes, ponds, glaciers > 1 km^{2} (0.386 sq mi or 247 acres) and river estuaries.

Lay-Saint-Remy is a commune in the Meurthe-et-Moselle department in north-eastern France.

== See also ==
- Communes of the Meurthe-et-Moselle department
