= Pfalz D.XII =

1918 German fighter aircraft

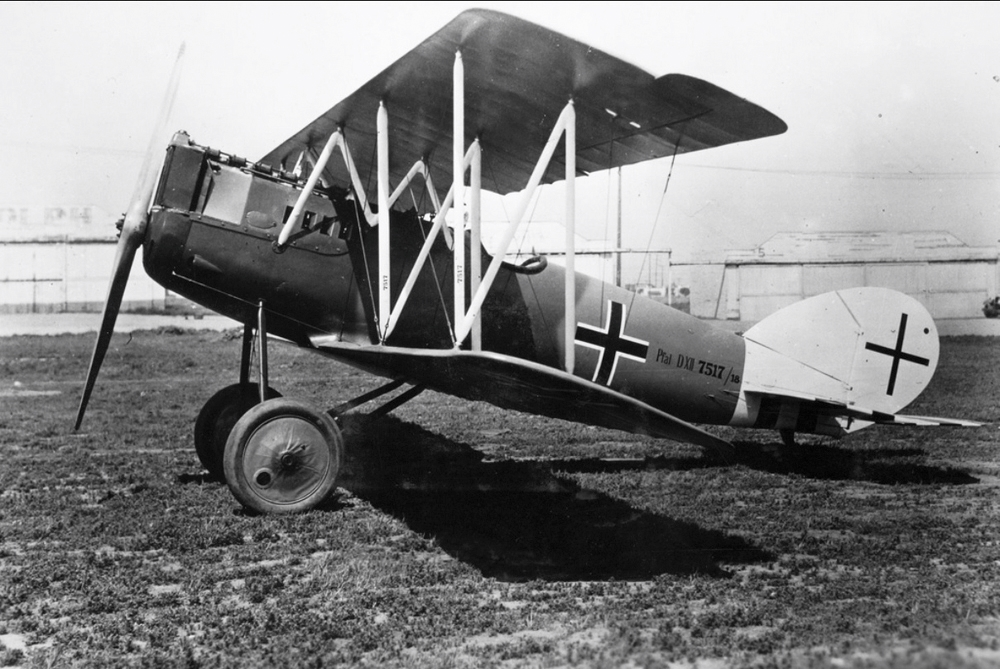
- Pfalz D.XII flown by pilot Louis C. "Buck" Kennell in Hollywood.

General information
- Type: Fighter
- Manufacturer: Pfalz Flugzeugwerke GmbH
- Designer: Rudolph Gehringer
- Primary user: Luftstreitkräfte
- Number built: approximately 800

History
- First flight: March 1918

The Pfalz D.XII is a German fighter aircraft built by Pfalz Flugzeugwerke. Designed by Rudolph Gehringer as a successor to the Pfalz D.III, the D.XII entered service in significant numbers near the end of the First World War. It was the last Pfalz aircraft to see widespread service. Though the D.XII was an effective fighter aircraft, it was overshadowed by the highly successful Fokker D.VII.

== Design and development ==
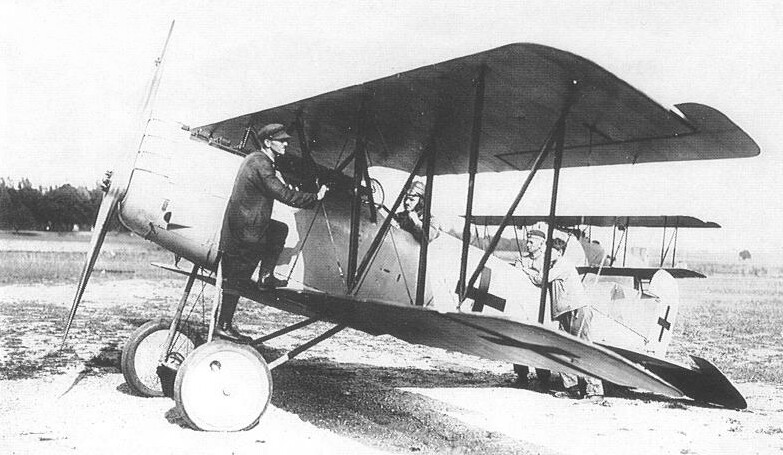
Test pilot Otto August in an early Pfalz D.XII

In early 1918, the Idflieg (Inspektion der Fliegertruppen) distributed to German aircraft manufacturers a detailed engineering report on the SPAD S.VII, whose wing structure Idflieg considered to be well-designed. Pfalz accordingly produced several Pfalz D.III-derived prototypes with SPAD-type wings. These developed into the Pfalz D.XII. The new aircraft was powered by the 180 hp Mercedes D.IIIaü engine and continued the use of LFG-Roland's patented Wickelrumpf plywood-skinned monocoque fuselage construction. (Note: In Wickelrumpf construction, two layers of thin plywood strips were placed over a mold to form one half of a fuselage shell. The fuselage halves were then glued together, covered with a layer of fabric, and doped. LFG-Roland introduced the construction method in the Roland C.II, and licensed it for use in the Pfalz D.III.) Unlike the earlier aircraft, the D.XII used a two-bay wing cellule. Furthermore, the flush wing radiator was replaced with a car-type radiator mounted in front of the engine.

The prototype D.XII first flew in March 1918. Subsequently, Idflieg issued a production order for 50 aircraft. Pfalz entered several D.XII prototypes in the second fighter competition at Adlershof in May/June 1918. Only Ernst Udet and Hans Weiss favored the D.XII over the Fokker D.VII, but Udet's opinion carried such weight that Pfalz received substantial production orders for the D.XII. The aircraft passed its Typenprüfung (official type test) on 19 June 1918.

Difficulties with the radiator, which used vertical tubes rather than the more common honeycomb structure, delayed initial deliveries of the D.XII until June. The first 200 production examples could be distinguished by their rectangular fin and rudder. Subsequent aircraft featured a larger, rounded rudder profile.

== Operational use ==
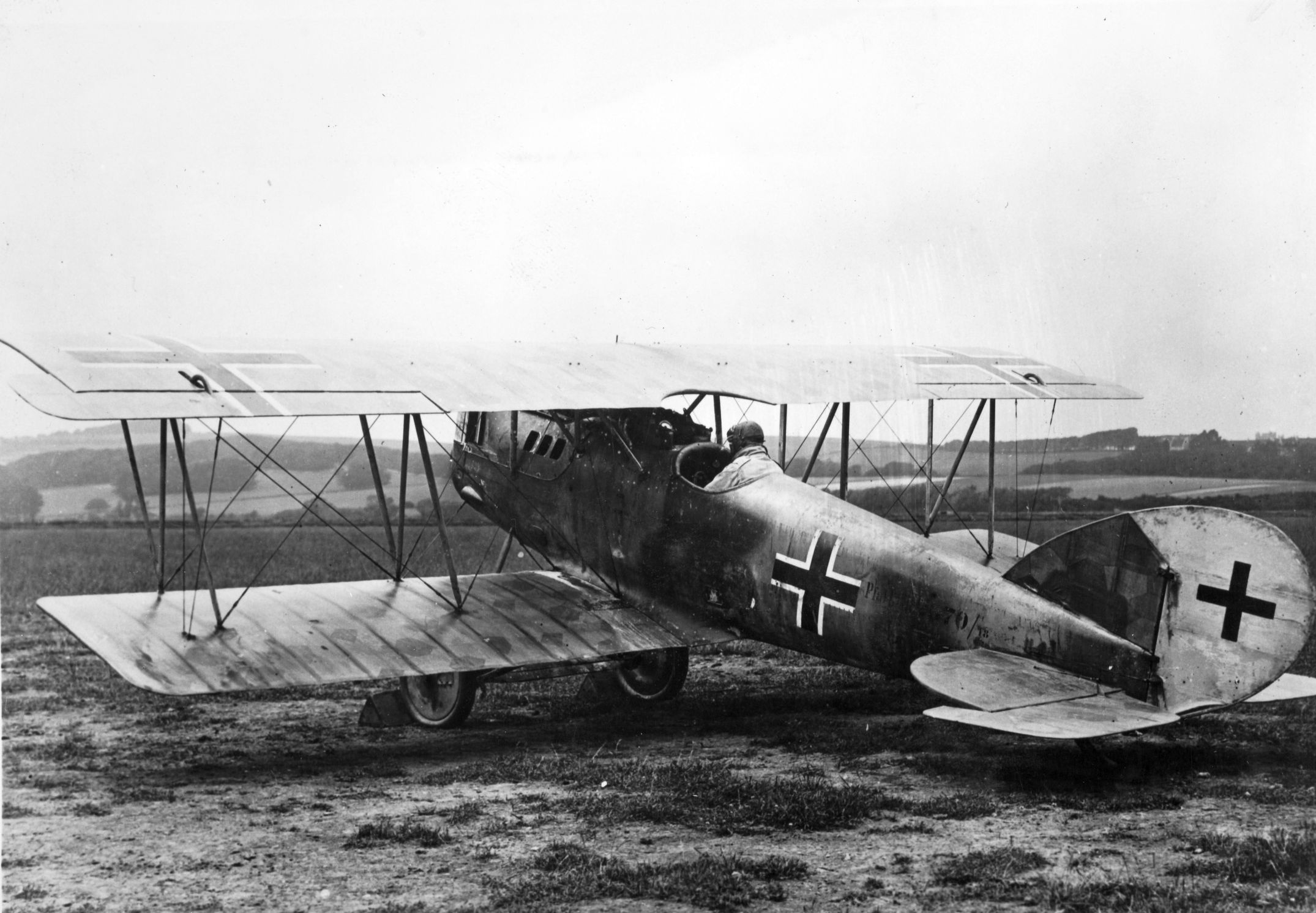
Captured Pfalz D.XII (serial 2670/18) in Canada after the war

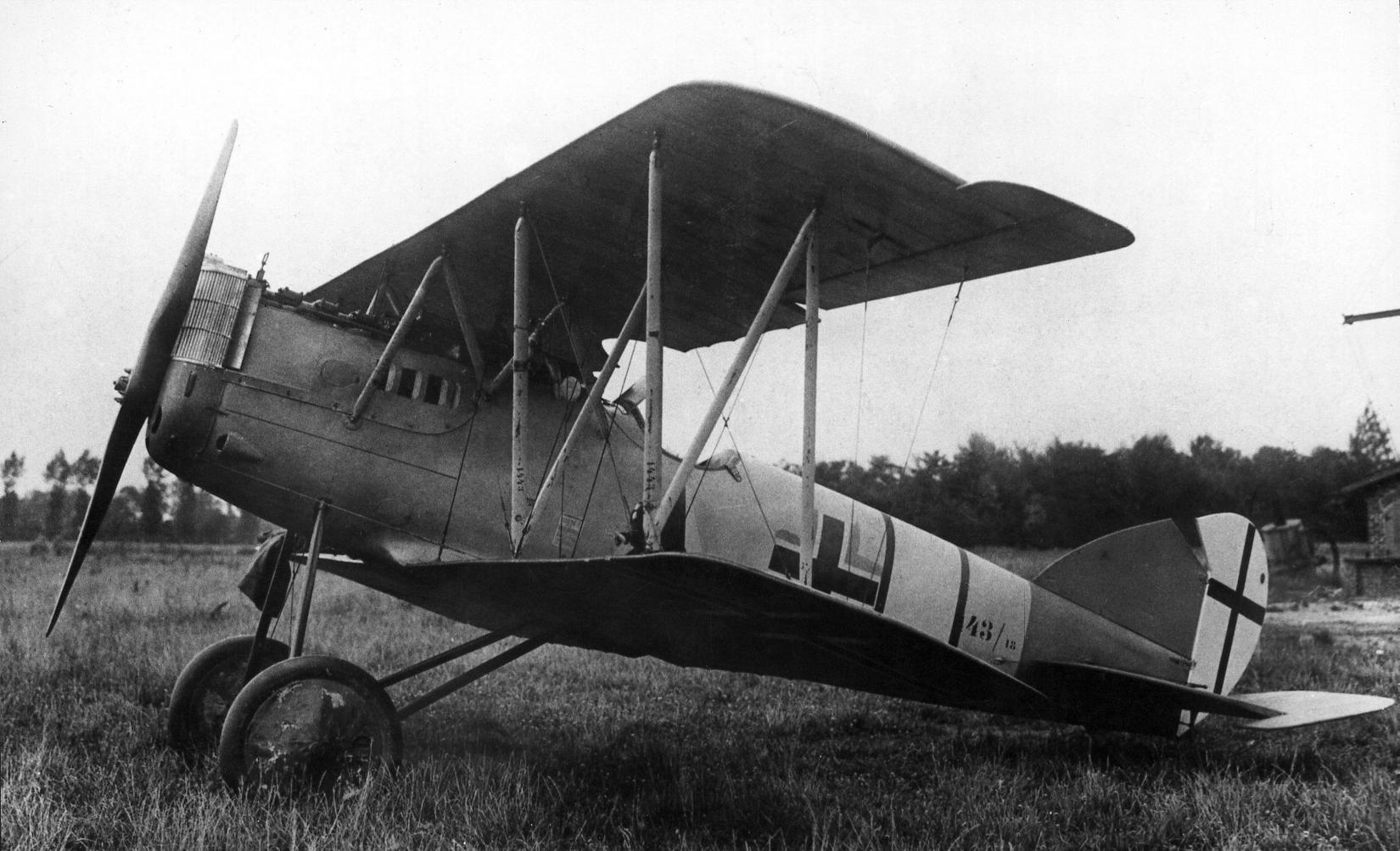
Pfalz D.XII (serial 1443/18)

The D.XII began reaching the Jagdstaffeln, primarily Bavarian units, in July 1918. Most units operated the D.XII in conjunction with other fighter types, but units in quieter sectors of the front were completely equipped with the D.XII.

While the D.XII was a marked improvement over the obsolescent Albatros D.Va and Pfalz D.IIIa, it nevertheless found little favor with German pilots, who strongly preferred the Fokker D.VII. Leutnant Rudolf Stark, commander of Jasta 35, wrote:

No one wanted to fly those Pfalzs except under compulsion, and those who had to made as much fuss as they could about practicing on them.

Later their pilots got on very well with them. They flew quite decently and could always keep pace with the Fokkers; in fact they dived even faster. But they were heavy for turns and fighting purposes, in which respect they were not to be compared with the Fokkers. The Fokker was a bloodstock animal that answered to the slightest movement of the hand and could almost guess the rider's will in advance. The Pfalz was a clumsy cart-horse that went heavy in the reins and obeyed nothing but the most brutal force.

Those who flew the Pfalzs did so because there were no other machines for them. But they always gazed enviously at the Fokkers and prayed for the quick chance of an exchange.

Thanks to its sturdy wing and thin airfoil section, the D.XII maintained the excellent high-speed dive characteristics of the earlier Pfalz D.III. Like most contemporary fighters, however, the D.XII had an abrupt stall and a pronounced tendency to spin. Furthermore, pilots consistently criticized the D.XII for its long takeoff run, heavy controls, and "clumsy" handling qualities in the air. Rate of roll, in particular, appears to have been deficient. Landings were difficult because the D.XII tended to float above the ground and the landing gear was weak. Ground crews disliked the extensive wire bracing of the two-bay wings, which required more maintenance than the Fokker D.VII's semi-cantilever wings. Evaluations of captured aircraft by Allied pilots were similarly unfavorable.

Between 750 and 800 D.XII scouts were completed by the Armistice. A substantial number, perhaps as many as 175, were surrendered to the Allies. Of these, a few were shipped to the United States and Canada for evaluation.

== Variants ==
=== Pfalz experimental D types ===
During the development of the D.XII, Pfalz produced several Pfalz D.III-derived prototypes with SPAD-type wings and Windhoff "ear" radiators.

=== Pfalz D.XIIf ===
The overcompressed BMW IIIa engine would have provided improved performance in the D.XIIf variant. Records show that Pfalz received 84 such engines between July and October 1918, but there is no photographic evidence of any production D.XII equipped with the BMW IIIa. In his autobiography, Anthony Fokker claimed that pilots deliberately wrecked D.XIIf aircraft so the engines could be salvaged and installed on Fokker D.VIIs.

=== Pfalz D.XIV ===
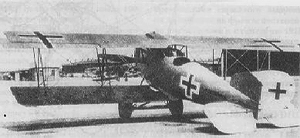
Pfalz D.XIV (serial 2800/18)

The Pfalz D.XIV was a derivative of the D.XII, utilizing the same fuselage and basic wing structure. The D.XIV differed primarily by replacing the 180 hp Mercedes D.IIIaü with the 200 hp Benz Bz.IVü, a substantially heavier engine. To cope with the increased power and weight, the D.XIV featured longer span wings and an enlarged vertical stabilizer. Enlarged ailerons were used to maintain rate of roll. A few prototypes were tested at the second Adlershof competition and a small production order ensued. Production was quickly terminated, however, and the D.XIV did not see active service. The D.XIV did not offer an appreciable increase in performance over the D.XII, and the Benz Bz.IVü engine was needed for reconnaissance aircraft.

== Survivors ==
Pfalz D.XII at the National Air and Space Museum. The aircraft wears spurious markings from the movie The Dawn Patrol

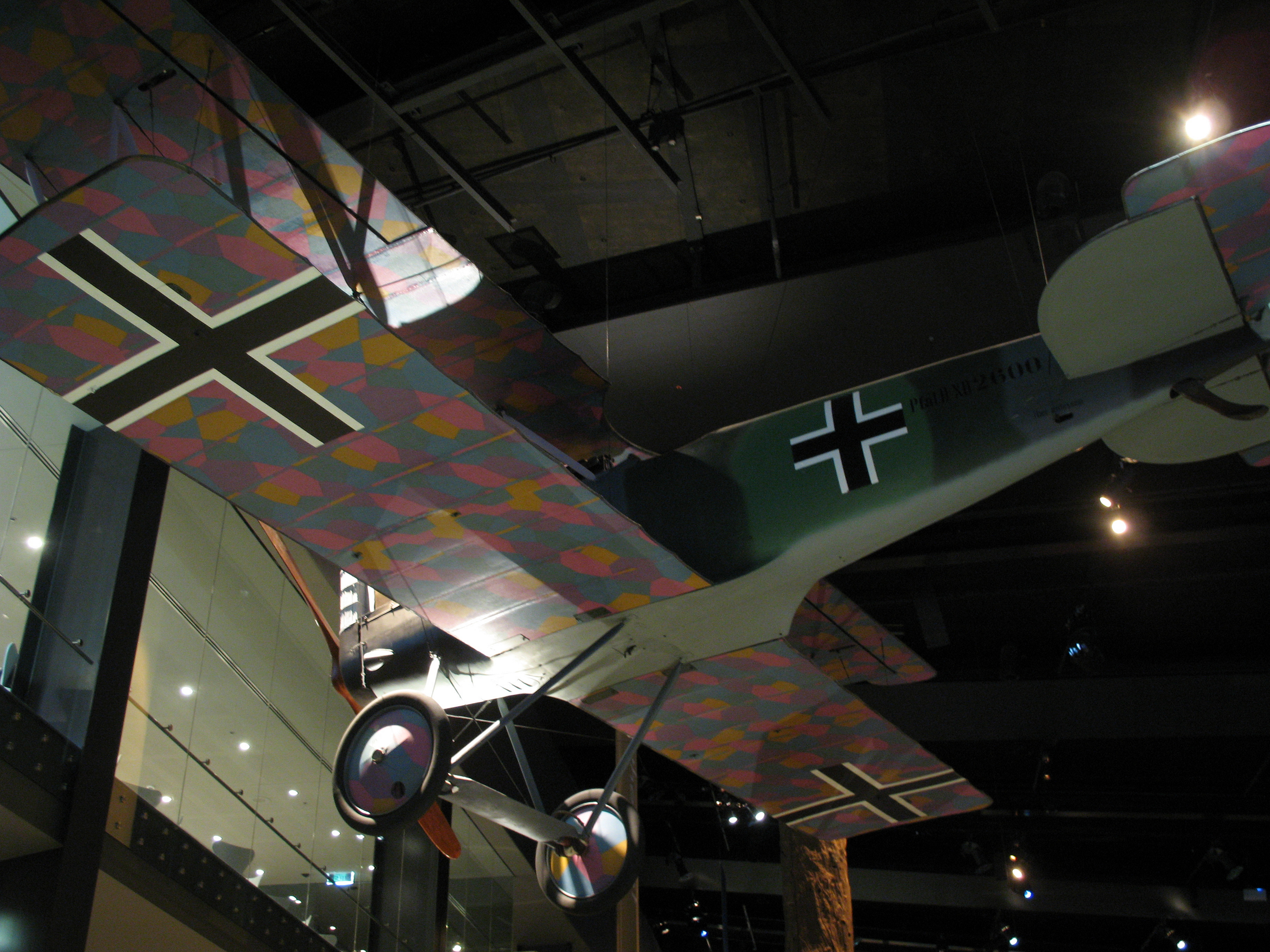
D.XII at the Australian War Memorial's ANZAC Hall.

- In the 1920s, two D.XIIs were sold as war surplus to the Crawford Aeroplane & Supply Co. of Venice, California. Though badly deteriorated, the aircraft briefly appeared as props in the 1930 movie The Dawn Patrol. Both D.XIIs were eventually sold to private collectors. Today, one of these aircraft is now displayed at the Seattle Museum of Flight, after it was acquired from the defunct Champlin Fighter Museum, in Mesa, Arizona. The second is exhibited at the National Air and Space Museum, in Washington D.C.
- Serial 2690/18 is also displayed at the Musée de l'air et de l'espace in Paris.
- Serial 2600/18 was one of several Pfalz D.XIIs awarded to Australia in 1919 under the terms of the Armistice. Its service history is unknown. In late 1919, the aircraft was shipped from 2nd Aircraft Salvage Depot in France to England, and subsequently to Australia. It was temporarily exhibited in Melbourne and Adelaide in 1920. In 1924, the aircraft went on display in Sydney.

Serial 2600/18 was removed to storage in 2001. After an extensive restoration at the Treloar Technology Centre in Canberra, the aircraft went on display at the AWM's ANZAC Hall in 2008.

== Operators ==
=== Military operators ===
German Empire

- Luftstreitkräfte

Poland

- Polish Air Force (2 aircraft postwar)

=== Civil operators ===
United States

- Paramount Pictures property manager Louis Kinnell took one airframe to the shops of Chaffee Junior College and restored it to flying condition. This aircraft was kept at Dycer Field (Los Angeles, California) and was flown without registration for a short time in 1939.

== Specifications (D.XII) ==
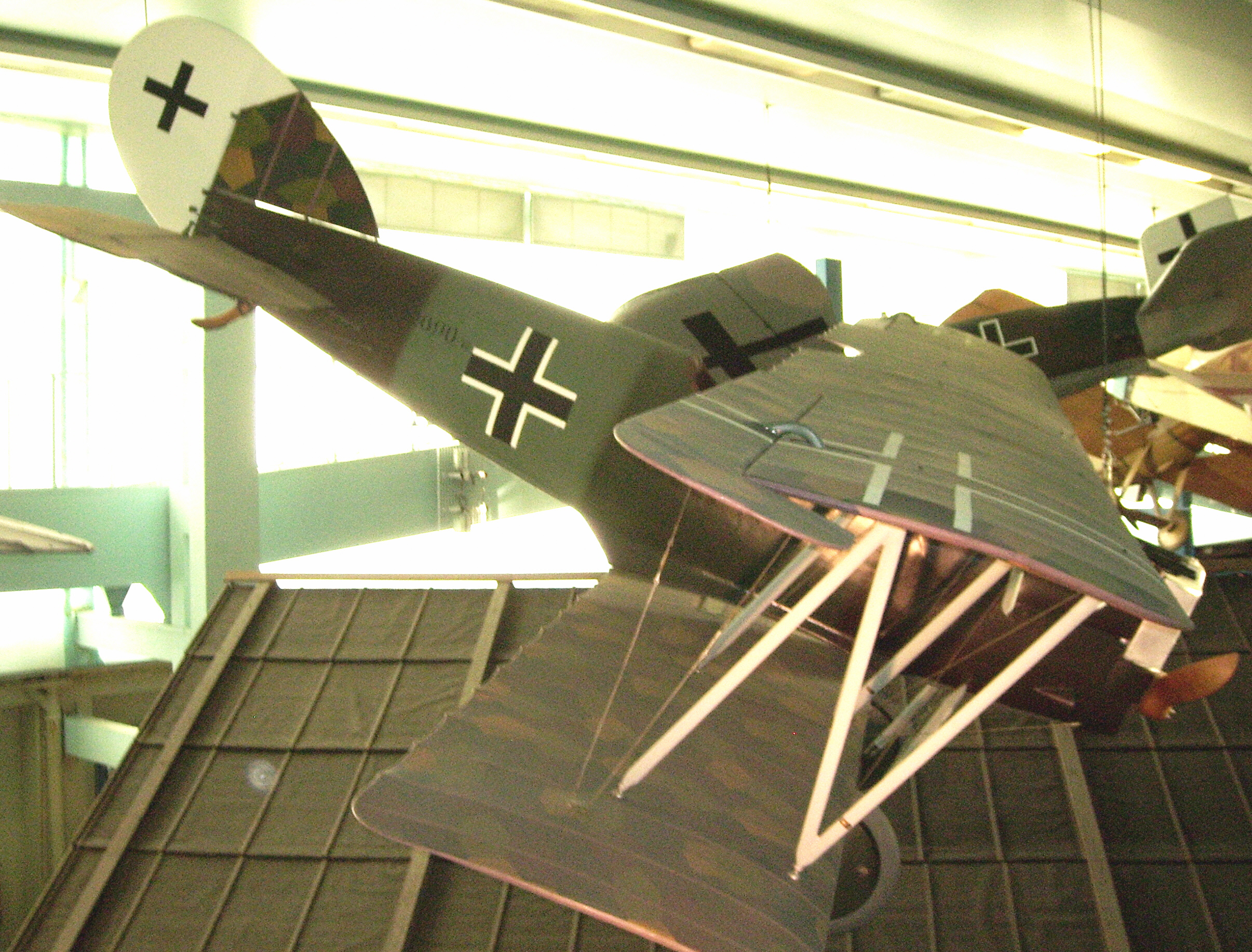
Pfalz D.XII (serial 2690/18) displayed at the Musée de l'Air et de l'Espace

Data from German Aircraft of the First World War

General characteristics

- Crew: 1
- Length: 6.35 m (20 ft 10 in)
- Wingspan: 9 m (29 ft 6 in)
- Height: 2.7 m (8 ft 10 in)
- Wing area: 21.7 m^{2} (234 sq ft)
- Empty weight: 716 kg (1,579 lb)
- Gross weight: 897 kg (1,978 lb)
- Powerplant: 1 × Mercedes D.IIIa 6-cyl water-cooled in-line piston engine, 130 kW (180 hp)

Performance

- Maximum speed: 170 km/h (110 mph, 92 kn)
- Endurance: 2½ hours (420 km)
- Service ceiling: 5,600 m (18,500 ft)
- Rate of climb: 4 m/s (790 ft/min)
- Time to altitude:
  - 1,000 m (3,300 ft) in 3 minutes 24 seconds
  - 5,000 m (16,000 ft) in 29 minutes 54 seconds

Armament

- Guns: 2 × 7.92 mm (0.312 in) LMG 08/15 machine guns

== See also ==
Related lists

- List of military aircraft of Germany
- List of fighter aircraft

== Bibliography ==
- Gray, Peter and Owen Thetford. German Aircraft of the First World War. London: Putnam, 1962. ISBN 0-933852-71-1.
- Herris, Jack. Pfalz Aircraft of World War I (Great War Aircraft in Profile, Volume 4). Boulder, Colorado: Flying Machine Press, 2001. ISBN 1-891268-15-5.
- Herris, Jack (2012). Pfalz Aircraft of WWI: A Centennial Perspective on Great War Airplanes. Great War Aviation Centennial Series. Vol. 5. Charleston, SC: Aeronaut Books. ISBN 978-1-935881-12-4.
- VanWyngarden, Greg. Pfalz Scout Aces of World War I (Aircraft of the Aces No. 71). Oxford, UK: Osprey Publishing, 2006. ISBN 1-84176-998-3.
- Weyl, Alfred Richard. Fokker: The Creative Years. London: Putnam, 1965. ISBN 0-85177-817-8.
- Wynne, H. Hugh. The Motion Picture Stunt Pilots and Hollywood's Classic Aviation Movies. Missoula, Montana: Pictorial Histories Publishing Company, 1987. ISBN 0-933126-85-9.
