= 100th Aero Squadron =

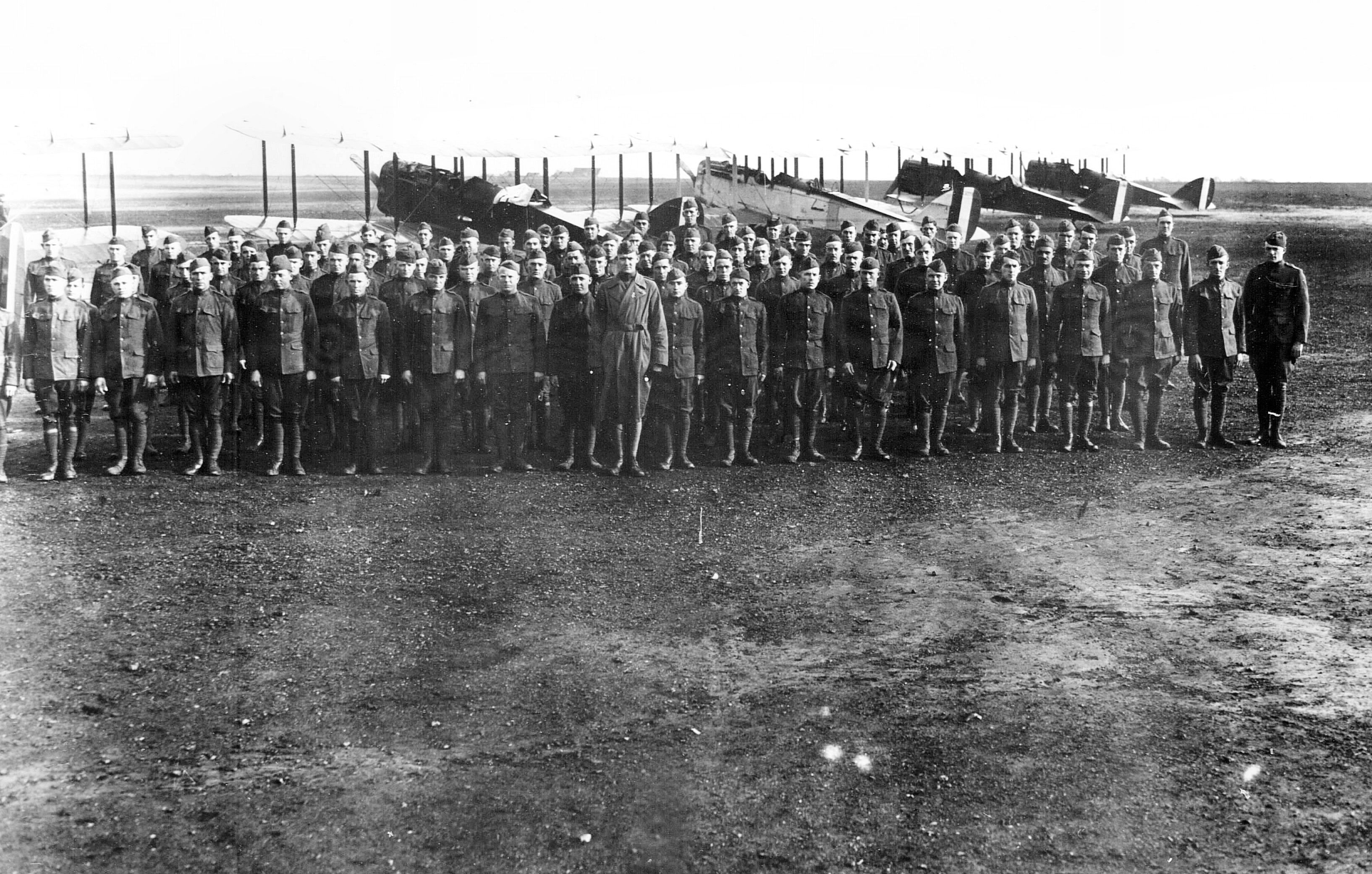
- 100th Aero Squadron - Squadron and Dayton-Wright DH-4s, Ourches Airdrome, France, November 1918
- Active: 20 August 1917 – 30 June 1919
- Country: United States
- Branch: Air Service, United States Army
- Type: Squadron
- Role: Day Bombardment
- Part of: American Expeditionary Forces (AEF)
- Engagements: World War I

Commanders
- Notable commanders: Capt. Balmont P. Beverly

Insignia
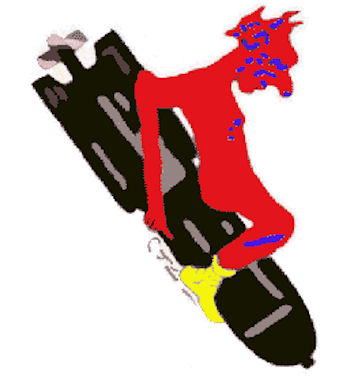
- 100th Aero Squadron Emblem

Aircraft flown
- Bomber: Dayton-Wright DH-4, 1918-1919
- Trainer: Curtiss JN-4, 1917

Service record
- Operations: 2nd Day Bombardment Group; Western Front, France: 26 October – 11 November 1918: No combat missions flown.

The 100th Aero Squadron was an Air Service, United States Army squadron during World War I. Ordered to serve on the Western Front, it boarded the SS Tuscania on 23 January 1918. The ship was torpedoed on 5 February and most of the survivors were rescued.

Re-formed in England the squadron was assigned as a Day Bombardment Squadron; its mission to perform long-range bombing attacks on roads and railroads; destruction of materiel and massed troop formations behind enemy lines. It was assigned to the 2d Day Bombardment Group, United States Second Army.

Just before its first scheduled combat mission, the war ended. After the 1918 Armistice with Germany, the squadron returned to the United States in June 1919 and was demobilized.

The squadron was never reactivated and there is no current United States Air Force or Air National Guard successor unit.

== History ==
=== Origins ===
The 100th Aero Squadron was organized on 20 August 1917 at Kelly Field, Texas. Initially, the squadron was given instruction in basic drill and the fundamentals of soldiering. After two months of indoctrination training, orders for overseas duty were issued and the squadron was ordered to Mineola Field, Long Island, New York on 14 October. At Mineola Field, instruction was given to the men in the maintenance of Curtiss JN-4 "Jenny" aircraft and the Liberty V-12 engine which powered them. Finally, on 20 January 1918, orders were issued for the squadron to proceed to the Port of Entry, Hoboken, New Jersey for service overseas.

=== The SS Tuscania sinking ===
The squadron boarded the SS Tuscania on 23 January, bound for the port of Liverpool, England. Initially sailing for Halifax, Nova Scotia, the Tuscania waited there to form up in a convoy prior to the Atlantic crossing. The crossing was uneventful until the late afternoon of 5 February. At 17:54 the ship was shaken to its keel by a large explosion, the significance of which everyone was aware. There was a quick alarm and some scurrying on the decks, however, there was no panic or disorder. The squadron historian writes:

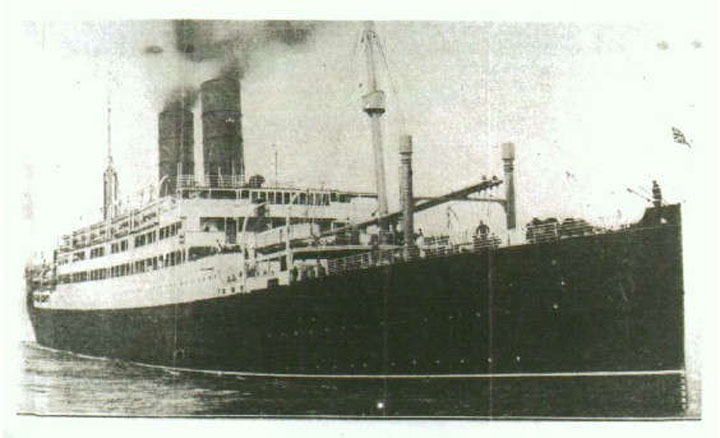
SS Tuscania

"... I had just finished supper and come onto 'B' Deck, at a point directly above the engine room when all of a sudden something struck the ship with a loud explosion. The boat seemed to be hurled entirely out of the water and trembled from one end to the other. The force of the explosion sent a column of water into the air that reached the top rigging. Several of us were directly in the path of this, receiving a thorough drenching. It was no time at all before the vessel listed sharply to starboard. This rendered the lowering of the lifeboats extremely difficult. All men immediately went to their assigned lifeboats, and, despite a natural state of excitement, perfect order prevailed. I was on the port side of 'A' Deck and five other members of the Squadron, who with a number of men from the 158th Squadron were supposed to have been lowered in one of the first boats. There ensued some difficulty, however, in launching the boat so we could do nothing but look overboard at the unfortunate ones fighting for their lives in the icy water. The cries were enough to make one stand aghast.

About 19:45 a torpedo boat came alongside and threw ropes to us. The sea was now becoming rougher, causing the rescue ship to roll considerably and making the work of getting the men to safety on her decks very hazardous and difficult. One big wave caused the two vessels to rub sides, and the poor unfortunates on the ropes were crushed to death between the sides. Other men dropped into the water and were drowned. Some of the boys of our Squadron who perished lost their lives in this manner. In the glare of one of the huge searchlights, I saw one lad struggling in the water, without a life preserver, attempting to catch a line which a British sailor was throwing to him. He finally succeeded in catching hold of the rope, but his hands were evidently frozen and he slipped limply back into the water. After several more unsuccessful attempts, he was fortunate enough to effect a half-hitch around his numbed body and he was hoisted to the deck of the destroyer as it pulled away. After this, the destroyer left there followed some very anxious moments for us, and, while we waited and shivered it appeared that our doom was sealed. It was at this time that someone began singing the 'Star Spangled Banner'. It met with a resounding response, and soon the whole ship echoed the national anthem.

At 20:30, the destroyer HMS Pigeon steamed alongside of the port bow, and we were soon removed safely on her decks. During the progress of the rescue, two torpedoes were fired by the submarine, one grazing the stern of the British Destroyer, and the second missing only a few yards to the bow of the Tuscania. The detachment of which I was a member was landed at Buncranne, Ireland, about 02:00 on 6 February, cold, desolate, but with an unbroken spirit and increasing hatred for the Kaiser..."

=== Training in England ===
After the sinking, the 100th Aero Squadron was re-formed at Winchester, England. At Winchester, the men of the squadron were taken into the quarters of the 6th Battalion of the Royal Fusiliers, who furnished the men with clothing, food, and merriment. At Winchester, the squadron was assigned to the Royal Flying Corps, who divided the men into three detachments. Flight "A" was sent to RFC London Colney; Flight "B" to RFC Stamford, and Flight "C" to RFC Feltwell. At those stations, the men were instructed in the intricacies of French SPADs, Sopwith Camels, Sopwith Pups and Avros. On 5 May, the squadron was re-assembled at RFC Feltwell, fully trained on the mechanics of the airplanes.

=== Duty in France ===
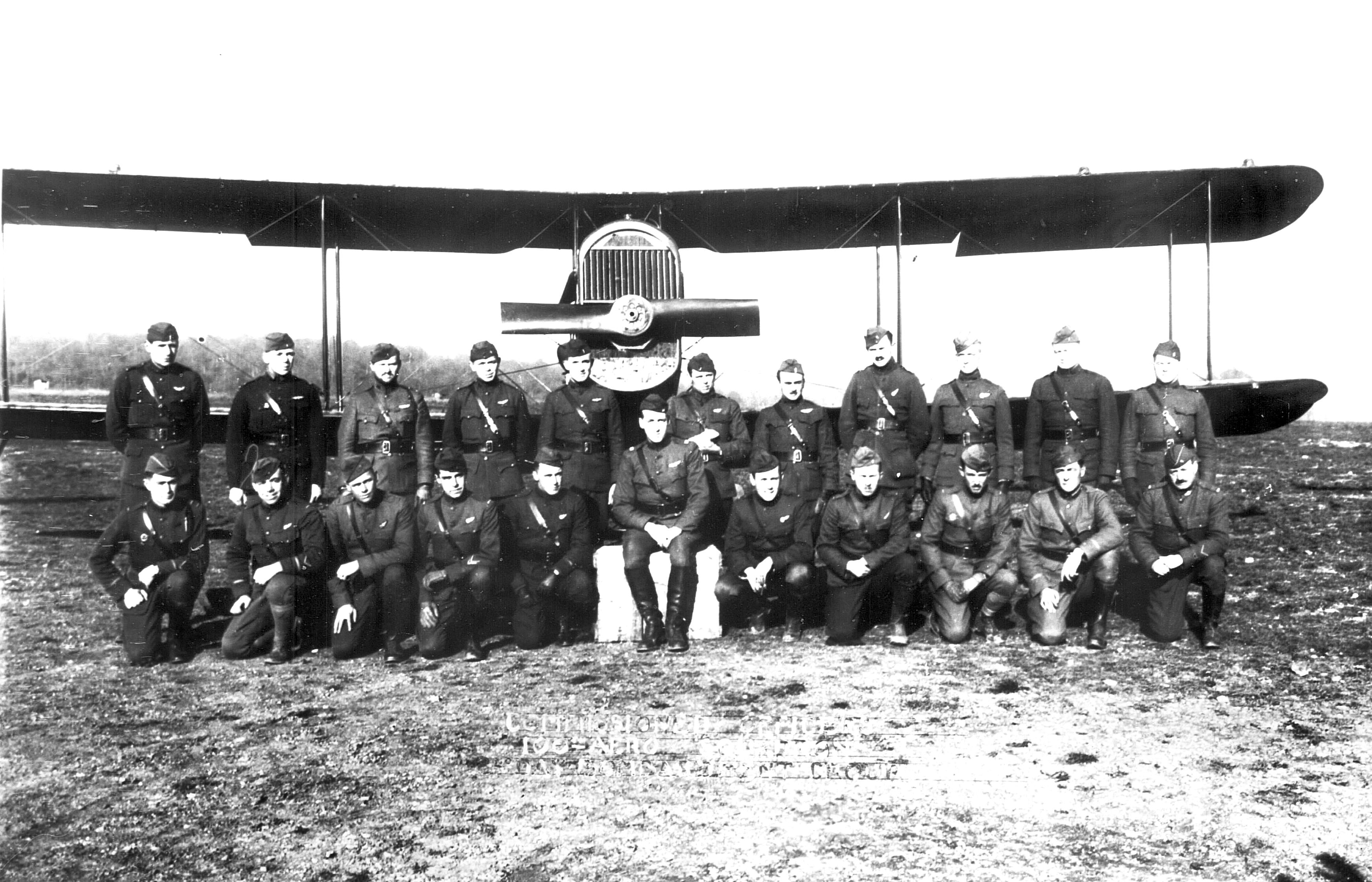
Pilots of the 100th Aero Squadron along with a Dayton-Wright DH-4, Ourches Airdrome, France, November 1918

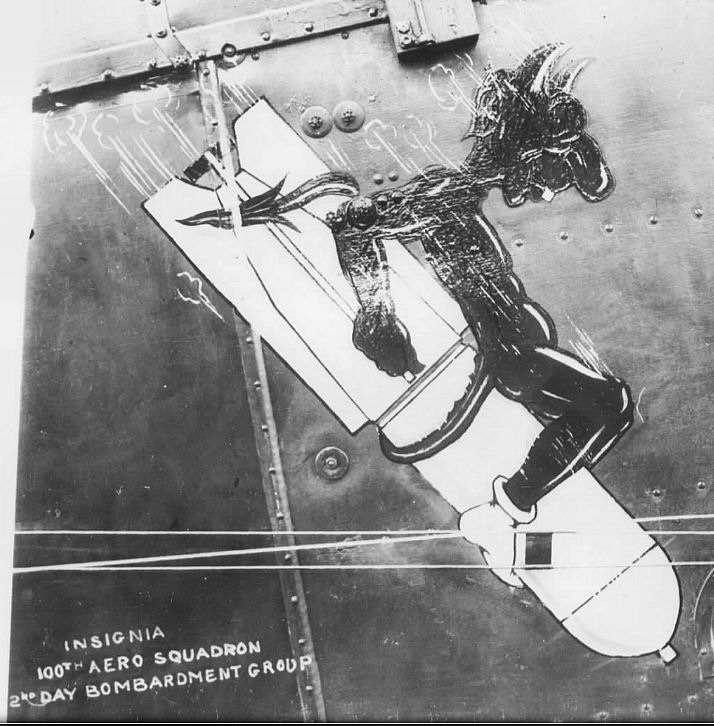
Squadron Emblem, painted on the fuselage of DH-4.

At Feltwell, the squadron trained for an additional three months, with the men itching with impatience to get to France. After three months of final training, orders were finally received to report to the Air Service Replacement Concentration Center, St. Maixent Replacement Barracks. Arriving at St. Maixent on 16 August, the 100th was first designated as Pursuit squadron. However, it was then changed a Day Bombardment squadron, and was ordered to Delouze Aerodrome, where it was assigned to the 1st Day Bombardment Group, First Army. However, there were no planes assigned to the squadron and no pilots to fly them. The 100th was assigned to camp duties and remained at Delouze when the rest of the group moved out to Amanty Airdrome, on 7 September. It was then assigned as the Headquarters squadron at Delouze, being in charge of the camp facilities and providing guards for the airfield.

The 100th Aero Squadron remained at Delouze until 30 October when a veteran officer-pilot, Captain Belmont P. Beverly, took command of the unit. A number of pilots and observers were assigned and it prepared to become a fighting unit. The squadron was ordered to Ourches Aerodrome, and was assigned to the newly formed 2d Day Bombardment Group of Second Army, joining the 163d Aero Squadron. Support units assigned to Ourches were the 73d Park Squadron, along with the 9th and 16th Photo Sections. Also the squadron began to receive Dayton-Wright DH-4 aircraft and prepared to enter combat.

The Armistice with Germany on 11 November, however, was concluded before the squadron was assigned to any combat missions.

=== Demobilization ===
After the end of hostilities, the history of the 100th Aero Squadron is scant. It remained at Ourches until 15 April 1919 when the Second Army was demobilized. Orders were received for the squadron to report to the 1st Air Depot, Colombey-les-Belles Airdrome to turn in all of its supplies and equipment and was relieved from duty with the AEF. The squadron's DH-4 aircraft were delivered to the Air Service Production Center No. 2. at Romorantin Aerodrome, and there, practically all of the pilots and observers were detached from the squadron.

Personnel at Colombey were subsequently assigned to the commanding general, services of supply, and ordered to report to a staging camp in France for the return crossing of the Atlantic back to the United States.

The 100th Aero Squadron was shipped home on 31 May 1919 on the SS St. Louis. It was then demobilized at Mitchel Field, New York in June, where the men returned to civilian life.

=== Lineage ===
- Organized as: 100th Aero Squadron on 20 August 1917
- Re-designated: 100th Aero Squadron (Pursuit), August 1918
- Re-designated: 100th Aero Squadron (Day Bombardment), August 1918

Demobilized on 30 June 1919

=== Assignments ===
- Post Headquarters, Kelly Field, 20 August 1917
- Aviation Concentration Center, 14 October 1917
- Air Service Headquarters, AEF, British Isles

Attached to: Royal Flying Corps for training, February–August 1918

- Air Service Replacement Concentration Center, 16 August 1918
- 1st Day Bombardment Group, 26 August 1918
- Headquarters Air Service, Zone of Advance, 7 September 1918
- 2d Day Bombardment Group, 1 November 1918
- 1st Air Depot, 15 April 1919
- Commanding General, Services of Supply, April 1919
- Post Headquarters, Mitchel Field, June 1919

=== Stations ===
- Kelly Field, Texas, 20 August 1917
- Aviation Concentration Center, Garden City, New York, 14 October 1917
- Port of Entry, Hoboken, New Jersey, 20 January 1918

Overseas Transport, SS Tuscania, 23 January – 5 February (Ship Torpedoed)

- Squadron re-formed at Winchester, England, February 1918

Divided into flights, assigned to various Royal Flying Corps stations in England, February–May 1918

- RFC Feltwell, England, 5 May 1918
- St. Maixent Replacement Barracks, France, 16 August 1918
- Delouze Aerodrome, France, 26 August 1918
- Ourches Aerodrome, France, 26 October 1918
- Colombey-les-Belles Airdrome, France, 15 April 1919
- France, April–May 1919
- Mitchel Field, New York, June 1919

== See also ==
- Organization of the Air Service of the American Expeditionary Force
- List of American aero squadrons
- Harry R. Truman
