= 163d Aero Squadron =

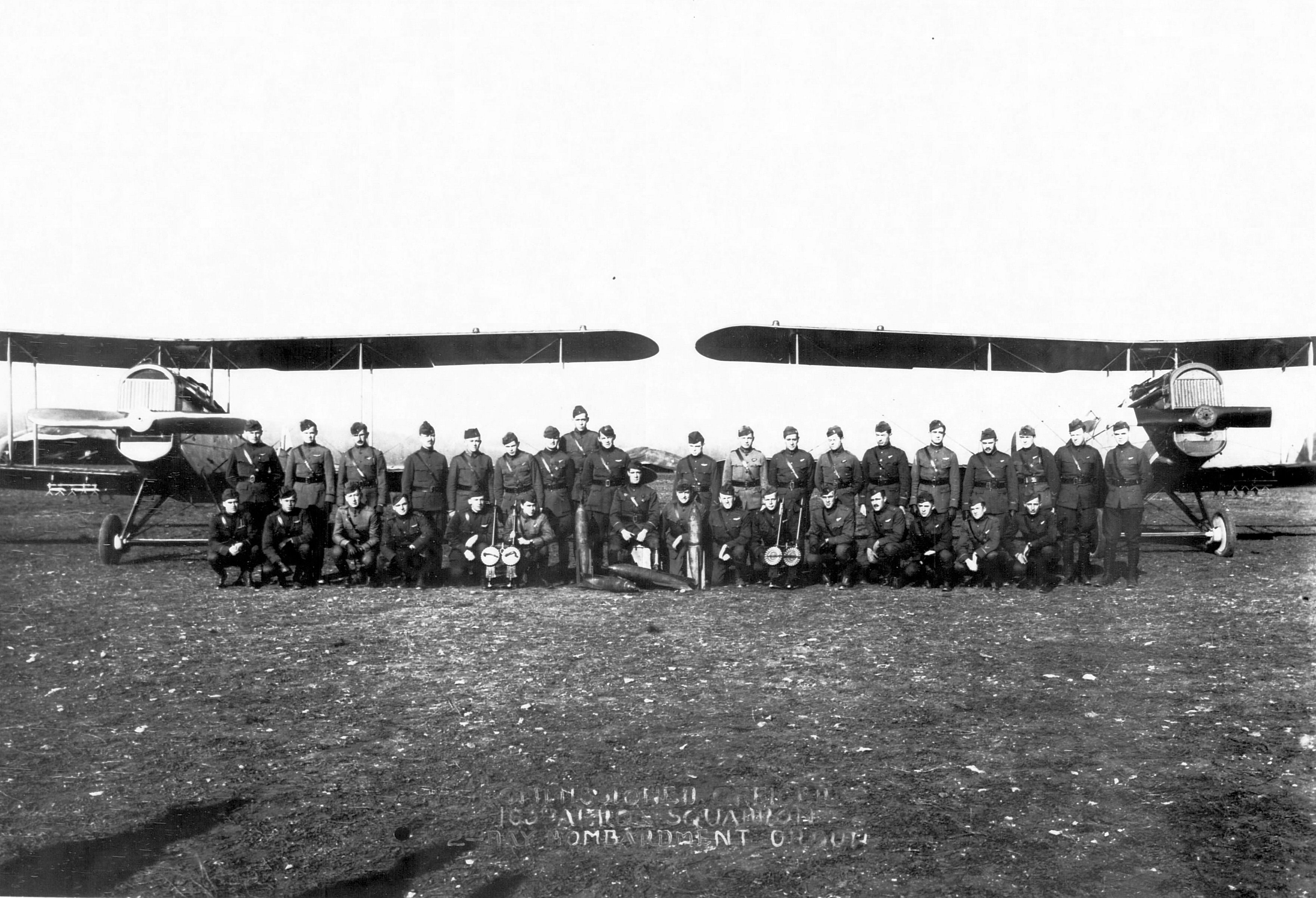
- Pilots and Dayton-Wright DH-4 planes of the 163d Aero Squadron (Day Bombardment), Ourches Aerodrome, France, November 1918
- Active: 18 December 1917 – 30 June 1919
- Country: United States
- Branch: United States Army Air Service
- Type: Squadron
- Role: Day Bombardment
- Part of: American Expeditionary Forces (AEF)
- Engagements: World War I

Commanders
- Notable commanders: Lt. Charles H. Kinsolving

Insignia
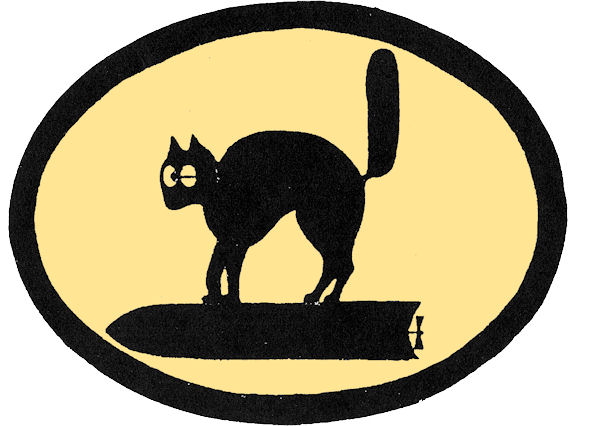
- 163d Aero Squadron Emblem

Aircraft flown
- Bomber: Dayton-Wright DH-4, 1918–1919
- Trainer: Curtiss JN-4, 1918

Service record
- Operations: 2d Day Bombardment Group; Western Front, France: 27 October – 11 November 1918: Began flying combat missions on 5 November 1918. No bombardment missions carried out, several enemy aircraft encountered, but no combat encountered.

The 163d Aero Squadron was a United States Army Air Service unit that fought on the Western Front during World War I.

The squadron was assigned as a Day Bombardment Squadron, assigned to the 2d Day Bombardment Group, United States Second Army. Its mission was to perform long-range bombing attacks on roads and railroads; destruction of materiel and massed troop formations behind enemy lines.

With Second Army's planned offensive drive on Metz cancelled due to the 1918 Armistice with Germany, the squadron returned to the United States in June 1919 and was demobilized.

The squadron has never been re-activated and there is no United States Air Force or Air National Guard unit with its lineage or history.

== History ==
=== Origins ===
The 163d Aero Squadron was organized at Kelly Field, Texas on 18 December 1917. After a brief period, the squadron was moved to Wilbur Wright Field, Fairfield, Ohio on 24 December. At Wright Field, the men of the squadron were classified into their assigned duties. After a Christmas Day holiday with a pass into Dayton, the training of the squadron began on the 26th, Long days were endured from 05:00 to 21:00 when each soldier was instructed in his specialty, for which he was expected to perform in combat.

Finally on 20 February 1918, the squadron was ordered to proceed from Wilbur Wright Field to the Aviation Concentration Center, Garden City, Long Island, New York for overseas duty. There the squadron waited until 25 February when it boarded the liner RMS Olympic and departed on its trans-Atlantic crossing. It arrived at the port of Liverpool, England on 6 March, one day after a slight skirmish with a submarine that the anti-submarine patrol engaged in. From Liverpool, the squadron traveled by train to the Romsey Rest Camp, near Winchester. There the squadron waited for orders, which it received on 16 March to proceed to Royal Flying Corps (RFC) station Narborough, Norfolk for combat training under the auspices of the RFC.

=== Training in England ===
RFC Narborough was destined to be the home of the 163d for the next five and a half months, as it began practical training for service and maintaining aircraft at the Front and all the other support duties necessary for an active combat squadron. On 16 August, the squadron was divided into four Flights, each one being sent to a different RFC station for final instruction prior to being assigned to France. Flight "A" went to RFC Easton-on-Hill; Flight "B" to RFC Wittering; Flight "C" to RFC Crail in Scotland and Flight "D" to RFC Witney. After two weeks, the squadron was re-assembled at the Flower Down Rest Camp, Winchester where a final inspection and overview was made by the RFC.

With training completed, on 2 September the squadron was moved across the English Channel to Le Havre, France. There, the squadron boarded a French troop train bound for the Replacement Concentration Center, AEF, St. Maixent Replacement Barracks on 4 September for equipping, and personnel processing. There, the squadron was designated as a Day Bombardment squadron, and would be equipped with American-built de Havilland DH-4, configured as bombers. The RFC had trained the squadron on British DH-4s, and the men were fully trained on the type. After a week at St. Maixent, on 11 September, the squadron moved to the 1st Air Depot at Colombey-les-Belles Airdrome. There the men were given gas masks and trained how to use the mask with tear gas.

=== Toul Sector ===
On 30 September, another move was made, this time to the "Zone of Advance" (Western Front), to a new Airdrome at Delouze. Delouze Aerodrome was devoid of any facilities, being, essentially, an empty field. Work was immediately started with new buildings being erected, barracks being constructed, roads built and sanitary provisions installed. Assigned to the Second Army Air Service, the squadron was informed this would be their base of operations, so no effort was spared in improving the station. After a month of preparation, the pilots and observers began to arrive on 20 October, along with its first DH-4 aircraft. On 23 October, the squadron suffered its first casualty, when Lt Wilson fell as his airplane was taking off, and was instantly killed. Flight Mechanic Davis was with Lt Wilson as a passenger, but was only slightly injured.

The squadron was formally assigned to the 2d Day Bombardment Group, however at Delouze, the squadron was too far from the front to effectively enter combat. Consequently, the group was moved to Ourches Aerodrome, some 20 miles closer to the Front on 1 November. By 4 November, the squadron had received its full quota of planes and flying personnel. It had already begun flying familiarization flights in the Toul Sector in order to learn the country and give those who were new to the front an opportunity to engage in combat behind our own lines. During the next several days, several enemy aircraft were encountered by no combats were engaged in. The next several days, bad weather kept the squadron on the ground, and it wasn't until the morning of 11 November that a bombing mission over enemy territory was planned. However, the Armistice with Germany ended combat operations at 11 a.m. and the mission was cancelled.

=== Demobilization ===
After the signing of the Armistice and the conclusion of the war, flying continued on a limited basis to keep the pilots proficient in their skills. However, the main endeavors of the squadron were infantry drill guard duty, and Army administrative paperwork. On 23 November while on an aerial photographic mission, Lt Martin fell with his aircraft from an altitude of 500 feet, both him and the pilot being instantly killed.

The squadron remained at Ourches Airdrome until 15 April 1919 when, with the inactivation of the Second Army Air Service, orders were received for the squadron to report to the 1st Air Depot, Colombey-les-Belles Airdrome to turn in all of its supplies and equipment and was relieved from duty with the AEF. The squadron's DH-4 aircraft were delivered to the Air Service Production Center No. 2. at Romorantin Aerodrome, and there, practically all of the pilots and observers were detached from the squadron.

Personnel at Colombey were subsequently assigned to the commanding general, services of supply, and ordered to report to one of several staging camps in France. There, personnel awaited scheduling to report to one of the base ports in France for transport to the United States

Upon return to the US, the 163d Aero Squadron was demobilized at Mitchell Field, New York on 13 June 1919

=== Lineage ===
- Organized as 163d Aero Squadron on 18 December 1917

Re-designated as: 163d Aero Squadron (Day Bombardment), on 4 September 1918
Demobilized on 13 June 1919

=== Assignments ===
- Post Headquarters, Kelly Field, 18 December 1917
- Post Headquarters, Wilbur Wright Field, 24 December 1917
- Aviation Concentration Center, 20 February 1918
- Headquarters, Chief of Air Service, British Isles

Attached to the Royal Flying Corps for training: 16 March – 2 September 1918

- Headquarters, Chief of Air Service, AEF, 2 September 1918
- Replacement Concentration Center, AEF, 4 September 1918
- 1st Air Depot, 11 September 1918
- 2d Day Bombardment Group, 1 November 1918
- 1st Air Depot, 15 April 1919
- Commanding General, Services of Supply, April 1919
- Post Headquarters, Mitchell Field, June 1919

=== Stations ===
- Kelly Field, Texas, 18 December 1917
- Wilbur Wright Field, Ohio, 24 December 1917
- Aviation Concentration Center, Garden City, New York, 20 February 1918
- Port of Entry, Hoboken, New Jersey, 24 February 1918

Overseas transport: RMS Olympic, 25 February – 6 March 1918

- Liverpool, England, 6 March 1918
- Romsey Rest Camp, Winchester, England, 7 March 1918
- RFC Narborough, England, 16 March 1918

Detachments at several Royal Flying Corps stations, 16–30 August 1918

- Flower Down Rest Camp, Winchester, England, 31 August 1918
- St. Maixent Replacement Barracks, France, 4 September 1918
- Colombey-les-Belles Aerodrome, France, 11 September 1918
- Delouze Aerodrome, France, 30 September 1918
- Ourches Aerodrome, France, 1 November 1918
- Colombey-les-Belles Aerodrome, France, 15 April 1919
- France, April 1919
- Mitchell Field, New York, June 1919

=== Combat sectors and campaigns ===
Streamer	Sector/Campaign	Dates	Notes
	Toul Sector	5–11 November 1918	

== See also ==
- Organization of the Air Service of the American Expeditionary Force
- List of American aero squadrons
