= 2nd Day Bombardment Group =

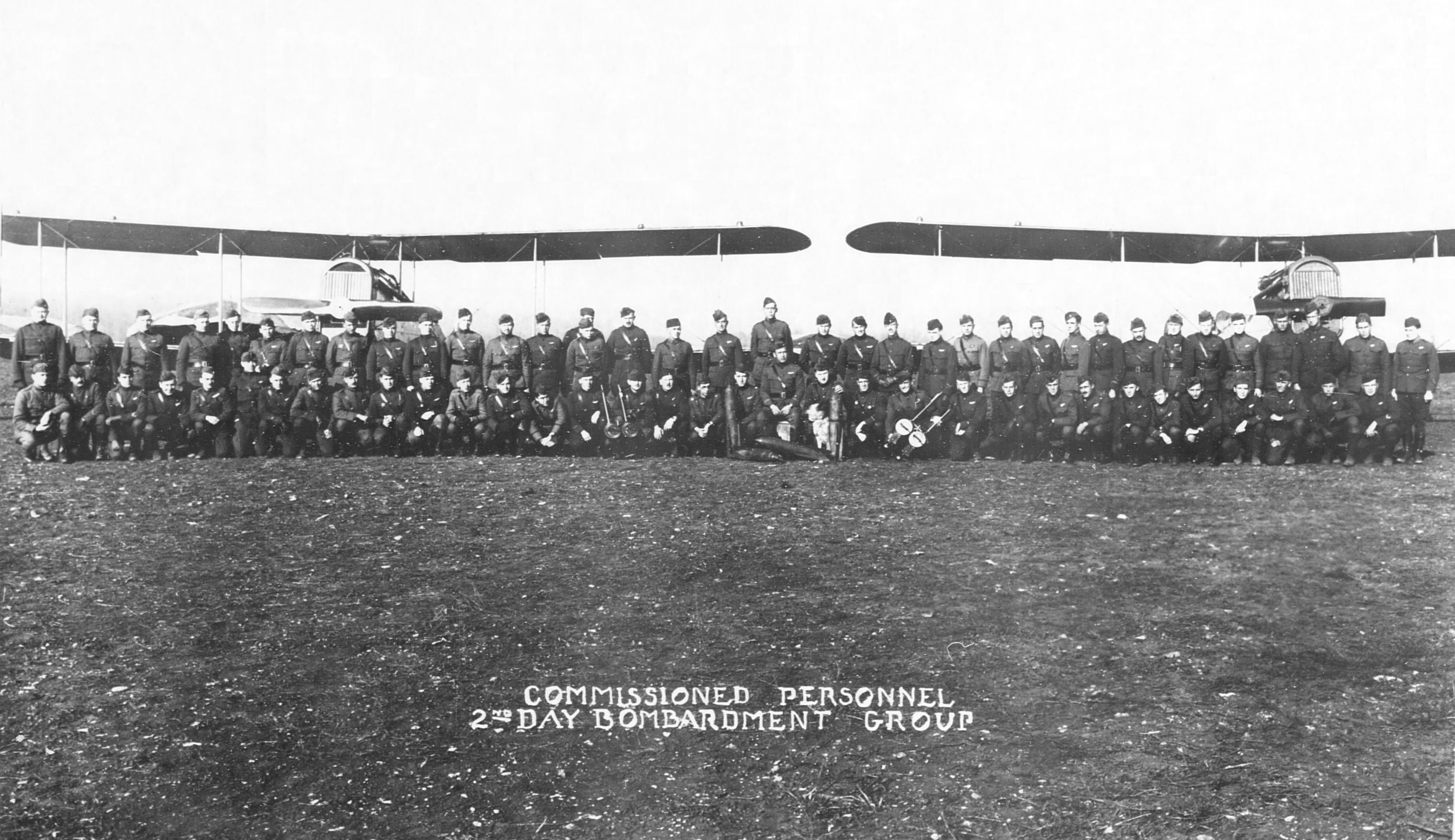
- 2nd Day Bombardment Group, November 1918
- Active: 1918–19
- Country: United States
- Branch: United States Army Air Service
- Type: Group (air force)
- Role: Day bombardment
- Part of: American Expeditionary Forces (AEF)
- Engagements: World War I

Insignia
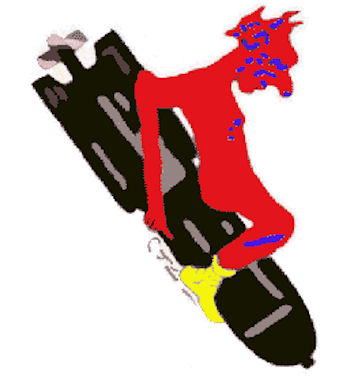
- 100th Aero Squadron emblem

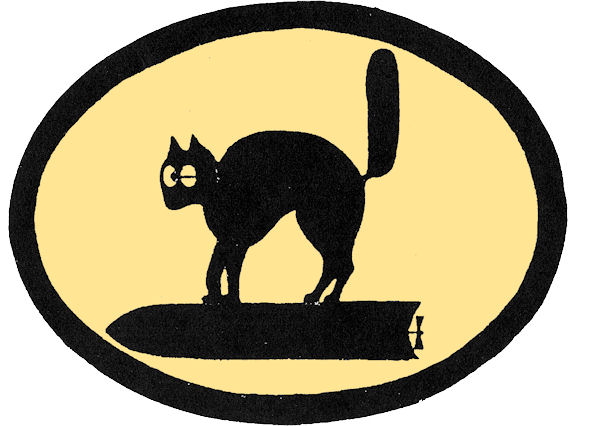
- 163rd Aero Squadron emblem

The 2nd Day Bombardment Group was a United States Army Air Service unit that fought on the Western Front during World War I as part of the Air Service, Second United States Army. It was demobilized in France on 15 April 1919. There is no modern United States Air Force unit that shares its lineage and history.

== History ==
The 2nd Day Bombardment Group was organized at Ourches Aerodrome, near Toul, France on 1 November 1918. The Group consisted of a Headquarters staff, and the 100th and 163rd Aero Squadrons. Previous to this date, the Aero Squadrons were assigned to the Second Army Air Service, after arriving at the front on 26 October.

By 7 November after several days of organization, supply and the development of operations plans, all of the groups Dayton-Wright DH-4 aircraft were made ready for combat service over the lines. Also and adequate supply of bombs, munitions and aviation gasoline had been received from the 1st Air Depot.

On 8 November orders to engage in combat operations were received from Second Army, together with a list of objectives assigned to the group in enemy territory. Then followed a period of poor flying weather which made any sort of operation extremely futile. However, on the morning of 11 November, all planes were on the line, ready to proceed with a mission to bomb Conflant. However at 11:00am, the armistice with Germany took effect and all raids were called off.

After the Armistice, the squadrons continued with proficiency flying on a limited basis to keep the pilots proficient in their skills. The Group remained at Ourches Airdrome until 15 April 1919 when, with the inactivation of the Second Army Air Service, the unit was ordered demobilized, and all equipment was ordered returned to the 1st Air Depot at Colombey-les-Belles Aerodrome.

Personnel were subsequently assigned to the Commanding General, Services of Supply and ordered to report to one of several staging camps in France. There, personnel awaited scheduling to report to one of the Base Ports in France for transport to the United States and subsequent demobilization.

=== Lineage ===
- Organized in France as: 2nd Day Bombardment Group, 1 November 1918

Demobilized in France on 15 April 1919

=== Assignments ===
- Second Army Air Service, 1 November 1918 – 15 April 1919

=== Components ===
- 100th Aero Squadron (Day Bombardment), 1 November 1918 – 15 April 1919
- 163rd Aero Squadron (Day Bombardment), 1 November 1918 – 15 April 1919

=== Stations ===
- Ourches Aerodrome, France, 1 November 1918 – 15 April 1919

== See also ==
- Organization of the Air Service of the American Expeditionary Force
