= Ourches Aerodrome =

World War I airfield in Lorraine, France

- Part of American Expeditionary Forces (AEF)
- Located near Toul, France.
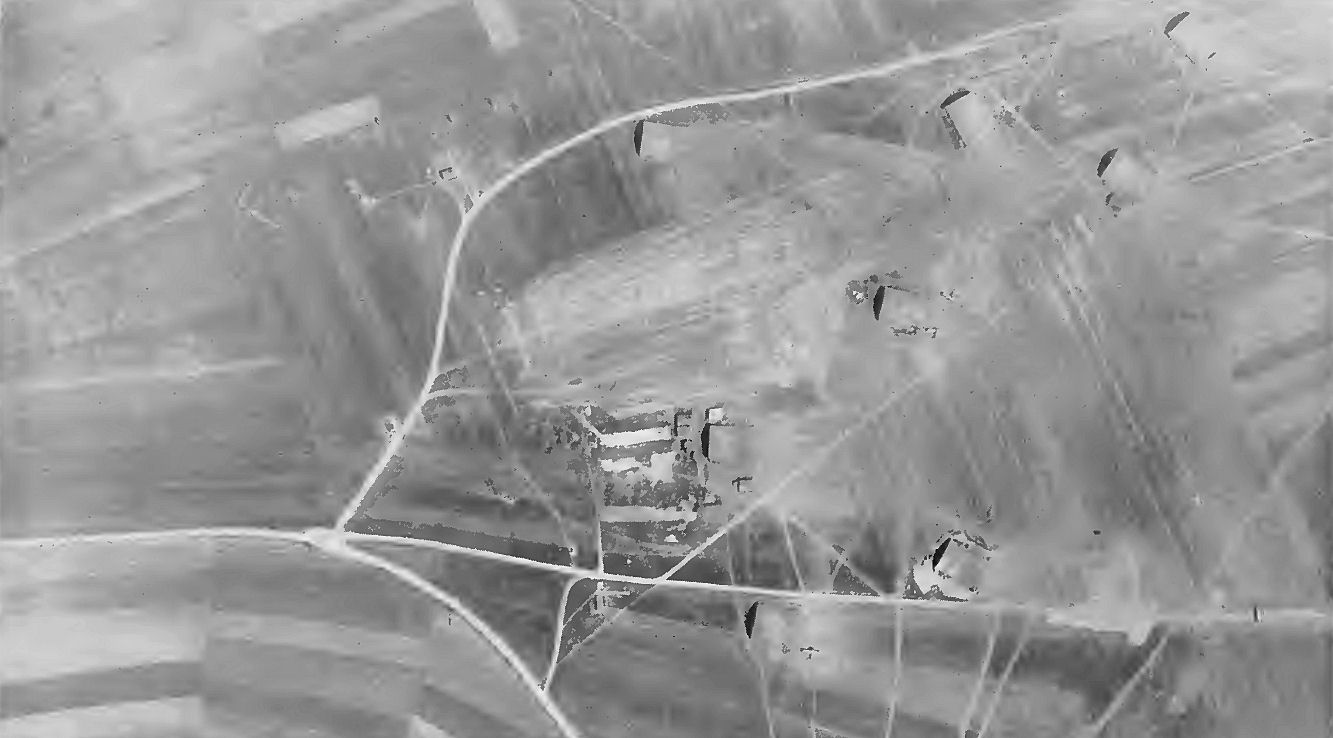
- Ourches Aerodrome - France, 1918

Site information
- Type: Combat Airfield
- Controlled by: Air Service, United States Army
- Condition: Agricultural area

Location
- Coordinates: 48°39′47″N 005°41′12″E

Site history
- Built: 1918
- In use: 1918–1919
- Battles/wars: World War I

Garrison information
- Garrison: I Corps Observation Group; IV Corps Observation Group; 2d Day Bombardment Group; United States First Army Air Service

Ourches Aerodrome, was a temporary World War I airfield in France, used by the Air Service, United States Army. It was 11 miles (18 km) west of the commune of Toul, in the Meuse department in Lorraine in north-eastern France.

== Overview ==
The airfield was built by the French Army and turned over to the United States in the spring of 1918 as one of its main operating bases. It was one of the first airfields used by the Air Service, with 465th Aero (Construct.) arriving on 3 March 1918, together with by 639th Aero Squadron (Repair).

The 1st Aero Squadron arrived on 4 April 1918 from Amanty Aerodrome where it had been training at the I Corps Observation Group School; it started flying observation missions for the American I Corps, joining the I Corps Observation Group on 21 April, after this had been created a few days earlier at Chéhéry. 12th Aero Squadron and 88th Aero Squadron soon arrived to complete the Group's workforce. The Group was engaged in battlefield reconnaissance over the Toul and Luneville sectors until early July, when dispatched in the Marne-Aisne sector to counter the last German offensives.

During Spring 1918, Ourches became was a large and expansive Aerodrome with the capability of supporting three observation squadrons with numerous barracks, mess halls, administrative buildings and a large number of hangars and photo-processing facilities.

- Flight "C" of 255th Aero Squadron (Service/Depot) was assigned to the airfield from 27 July 1918, probably until the last American unit had left; it was back in the US in June 1919.

Once I Corps Observation Group had moved to Francheville Aerodrome in early July, the airfield was all for the nascent IV Corps Observation Group which had been created on 1 July, initially with the sole 90th Aero Squadron; this squadron had arrived from training at Amanty on 1 June, flying observation missions for the American IV Corps over Lorraine. It was completed by 135th Aero Squadron on 30 July, 24th Aero Squadron on 6 August (soon to join US First Army Air Service on 22 Aug), and 8th Aero Squadron on 31 August; the group performed the same battlefield reconnaissance missions as I Corps's Group had during the St. Mihiel Offensive, then moved closer to the lines at the end of September during the Meuse-Argonne Offensive. The Groupe's HQ left for Ménil la Tour on 20 September 1918, with all squadrons gone by 30 September.

At the beginning of November, the new Second Army Air Service took over Ourches and the 2d Day Bombardment Group was created on the field on 1 November, planning to drive on Metz, with 100th Aero Squadron and 163d Aero Squadron. However, the 11 November Armistice ended combat and 2d Day Bombardment Group did not see any combat; it even did not go to Rhineland's occupation forces and was disbanded at Ourches on 15 April 1919.

The French dismantled the Aerodrome and the land was returned to agricultural use. Today it is a series of cultivated fields located northwest of Ourches-sur-meuse. The airfield was located to the east of the Départmental 144 (D144), with no indications of its wartime use.

== Known units assigned ==
- Headquarters, I Corps Observation Group, 1 April - 29 June 1918
- 1st Aero Squadron (Observation), 4 April - 29 June 1918
- 12th Aero Squadron (Observation), 3 May - 13 June 1918
- Headquarters, IV Corps Observation Group, 1 July - 29 September 1918
- 90th Aero Squadron (Observation), 13 June - 20 September 1918
- 135th Aero Squadron (Observation), 30 July - 30 September 1918
- 24th Aero Squadron (Observation), 6 – 22 August 1918
- 8th Aero Squadron (Observation), 31 August - 29 September 1918
- Headquarters, 2d Day Bombardment Group, 1 – 11 November 1918
- 100th Aero Squadron (Day Bombardment), 30 October - 11 November 1918
- 163d Aero Squadron (Day Bombardment), 1 – 11 November 1918

== See also ==
- List of Air Service American Expeditionary Force aerodromes in France
