= Day bomber =

Bomber aircraft for daylight missions

A day bomber is a bomber aircraft designed specifically for bombing missions in daylight. The term is now mostly of historical significance, because aircraft suited to both day and night bombing missions have become the norm.

== History ==
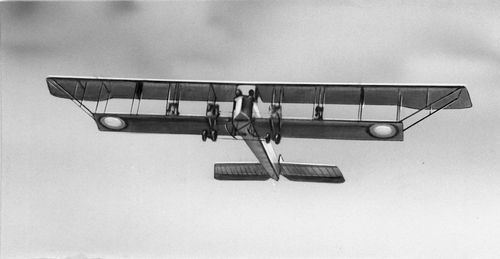
A Sikorsky Ilya Muromets S-23.

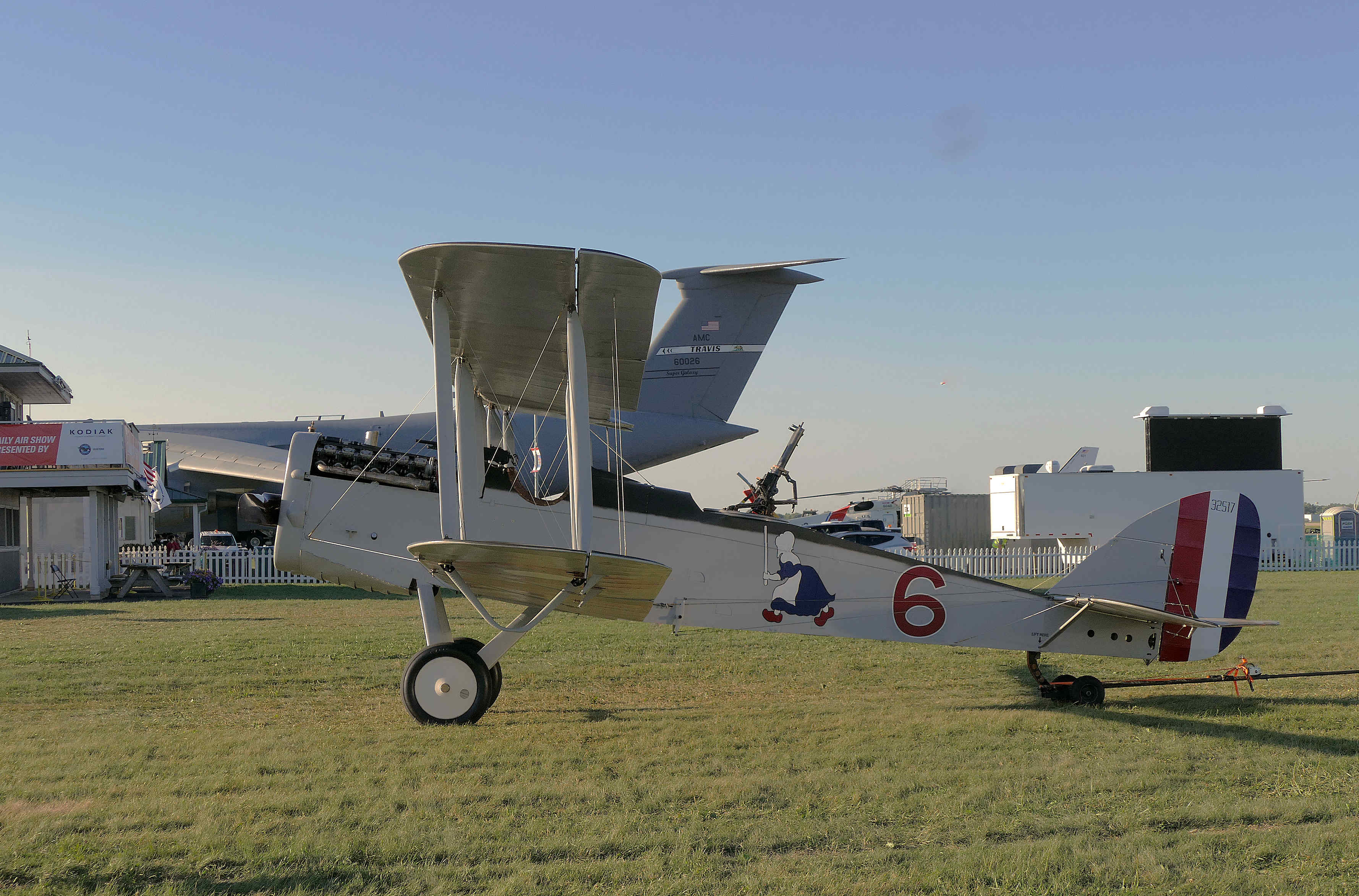
A surviving Airco DH.4, with US Army Air Service markings.

During World War I, day bombing was the normal form of bomber operations. While the same aircraft often also carried out night raids, the rudimentary bomb sight technology of 1914–1918 often made bombing sorties impractical at night. While bombing was usually performed by the crews of single-engine aircraft, the heavy bomber concept was pioneered by the three-engine Caproni Ca.1 of the Italian Corpo Aeronautico Militare and the four-engine Sikorsky Ilya Muromets, operated by the Russian Imperial Military Aviation Fleet. Adapted from a pre-war civil transport, the Muromets was noted for, among other things, formidable, air-to-air capabilities. While it normally carried two heavy machine guns, in separate positions, on some occasions these were augmented by a variety of light firearms, wielded by five or more crew members. One of the first aircraft explicitly conceived as a light day bomber was the single-engine Airco DH.4, designed by Geoffrey de Havilland. It had a crew of two: an air gunner, who operated a movable Lewis gun mounted on a Scarff ring and a pilot, who had a single, fixed Vickers gun. The DH.4 entered service with the British Royal Flying Corps in early 1917, and was regarded as a successful design: it served with the militaries of at least 14 countries and 6,295 were built in total (most of them under license in the United States).

During the interwar period (1918–1939), day bombing continued to feature prominently in the doctrines of major air services, especially the Royal Air Force (RAF). Day bombers were designed to counter air-to-air attacks. As such they were heavily armed, with multiple defensive weapons – typically heavy machine guns operated by gunners. Such aircraft were also intended to have minimal defensive blind spots: at least one gunner would be able to sight and fire on an attacking enemy fighter, regardless of the angle at which an attacker approached. Even single-engine light bombers, designed for daylight operations, carried a gunner. During the 1930s, an increasing emphasis was given in bomber design to the use of higher speeds in evading fighters. While the drag caused by gun turrets and the significant weight of machine guns detracted from speed and other aspects of performance, they were considered indispensable.

Undertaking daylight raids in the early stages of World War II, even the most effective bombers were found to suffer heavy losses and aircrew casualties, as a result of fighter attacks. If and when fighter escorts were available, they deterred and reduced the effectiveness of attackers. However, virtually all of the fighters operational at the beginning of the war were ill-suited to the role of accompanying large formations of bombers, to and from targets that were more than 200 miles (320 km) away. By the end of 1940, the difficulties in providing fighter cover led to the abandonment of large-scale long-range day bomber operations, by both the German Luftwaffe and the RAF.

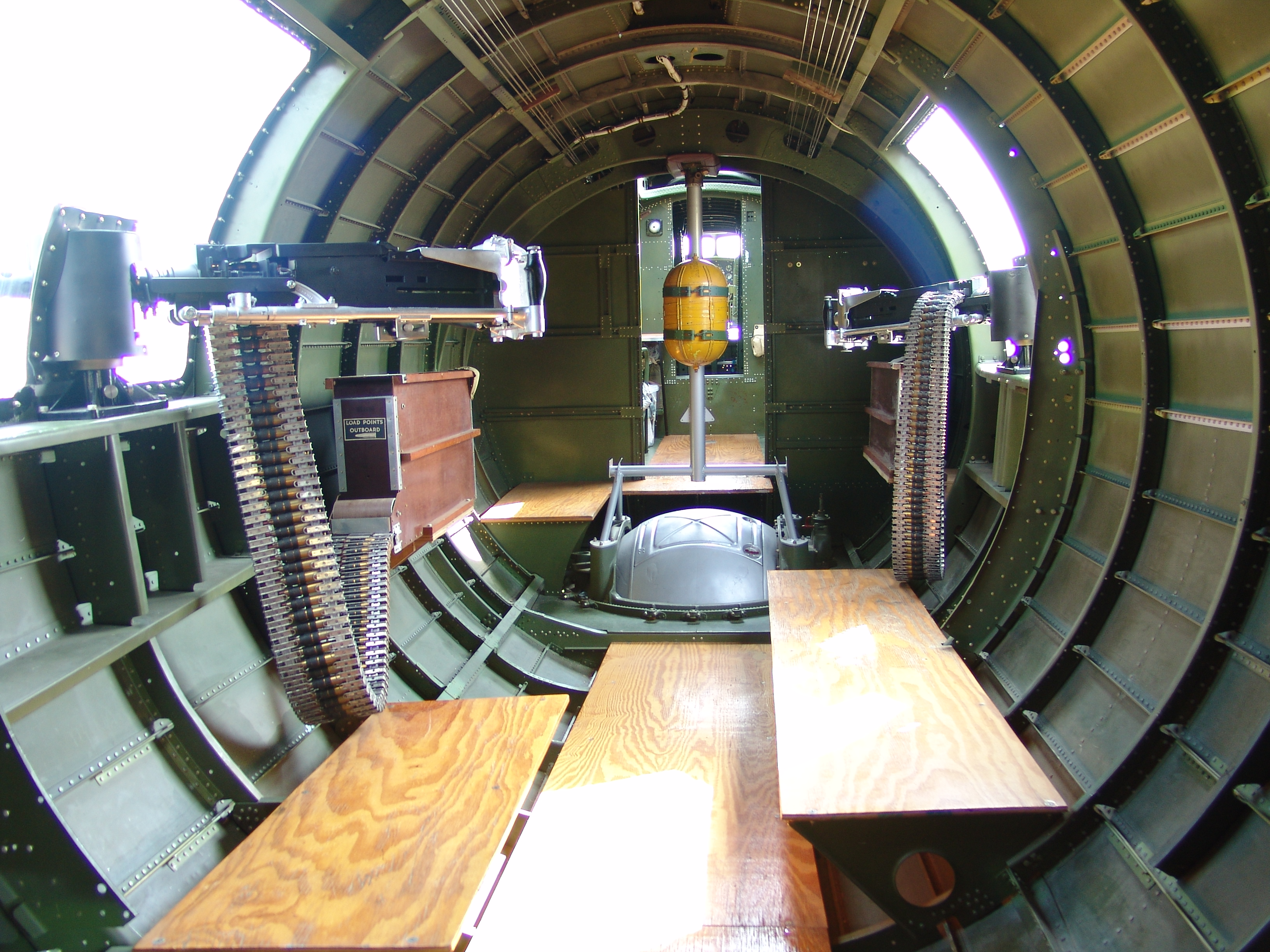
The adjoining waist gun positions in a Boeing B-17G epitomise the heavy defensive armament carried by day bombers.

After the United States entered the war, its main heavy bombers at the time – such the Boeing B-17 Flying Fortress and Consolidated B-24 Liberator – were seen to be so well-armed that they were suitable for unescorted daylight missions. However, the US Eighth Air Force, operating from bases in England, suffered far fewer losses after the introduction of fighters with ranges comparable to those of the bombers. At the same time, general purpose bombers and multirole aircraft were becoming more and more prominent: such designs were often capable of relatively high top speeds and rapid acceleration, assisting their pilots in avoiding direct attacks from fighters.
