= Colombey-les-Belles Aerodrome =

Colombey-les-Belles Aerodrome 1st Air Depot
- Part of American Expeditionary Forces (AEF)
- Located near: Colombey-les-Belles, France
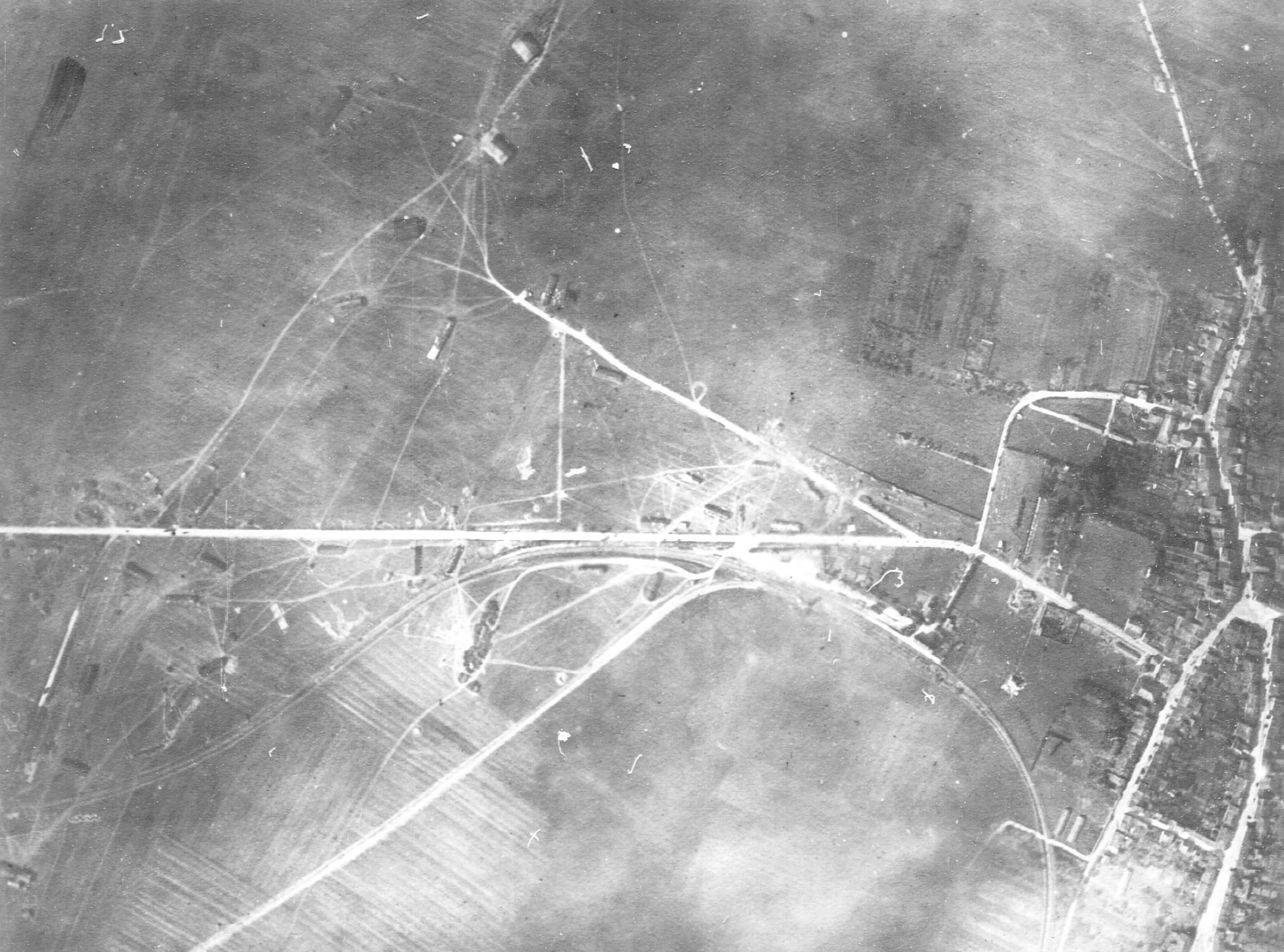
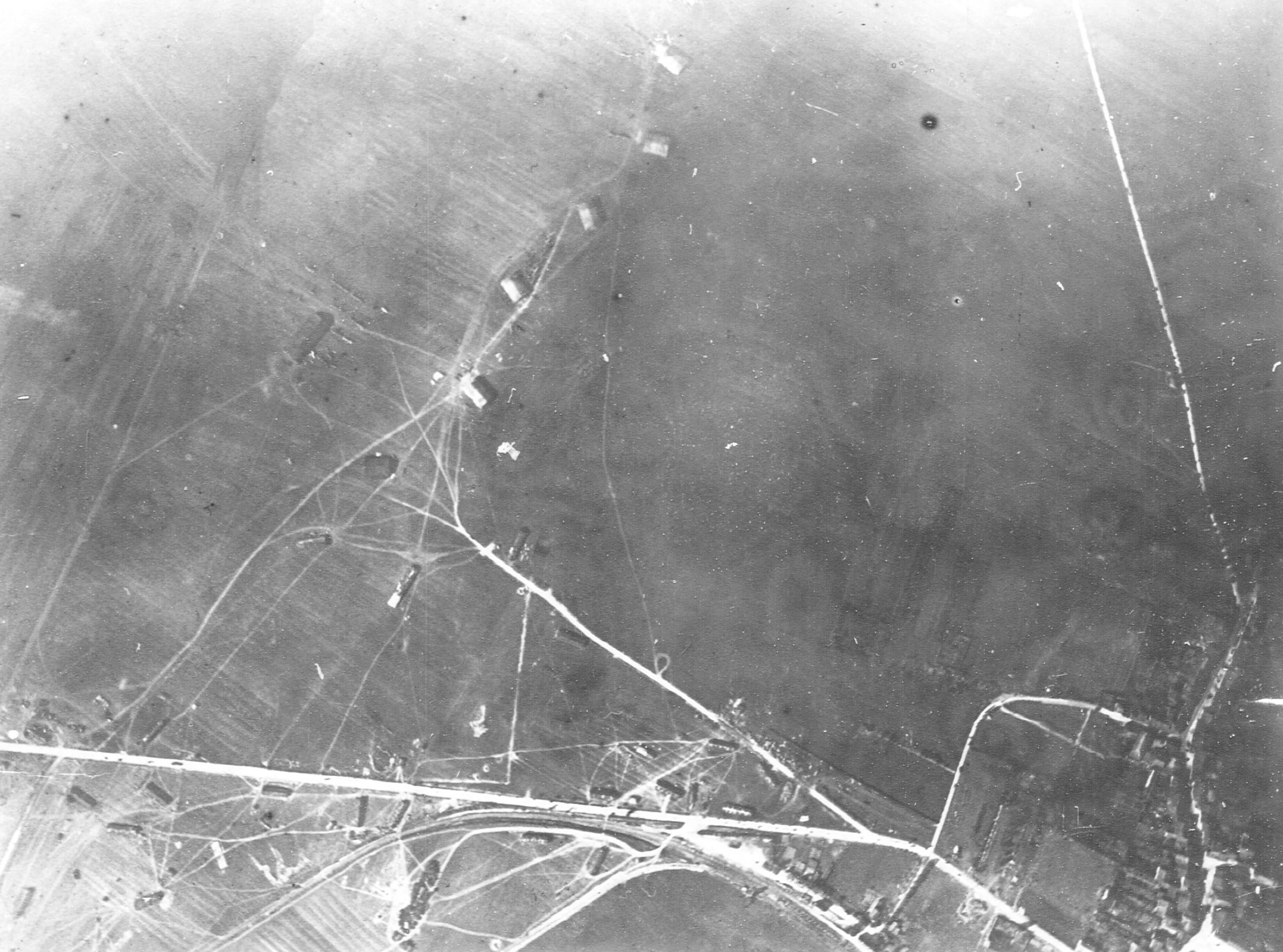
- 1st Air Depot Colombey-les-Belles Aerodrome

Site information
- Type: Combat Support Airfield
- Controlled by: Air Service, United States Army
- Condition: Agricultural area

Location
- Location within France
- Coordinates: 48°31′51″N 005°53′02″E (1st Air Depot); 48°31′28″N 005°54′28″E (Airfield)

Site history
- Built: 1918
- In use: 1918–1919
- Battles/wars: World War I

Garrison information
- Garrison: 1st Air Depot; Headquarters, Commanding General, Services of Supply

Colombey-les-Belles Aerodrome, was a temporary World War I airfield in France used by the Air Service of the American Expeditionary Force. It was located near Colombey-les-Belles, approximately 11 miles (18 km) south of Toul, in the Meurthe-et-Moselle department in north-eastern France.

Colombey-les-Belles Aerodrome was the location of the 1st Air Depot. It was the largest American facility in the combat zone of the Western Front and arguably, the most important, as the 1st Air Depot supplied and equipped every Air Service unit after their arrival at the front and entered combat.

== Overview ==
The 1st Air Depot supported operations of 33 combat airfields and 44 squadrons of the Air Service on the Western Front, as well as 23 Balloon Observation companies. There were a total of 950 aircraft with those squadrons, and 566 at the 1st Air Depot. Of the front-line combat squadrons, 38 were fully equipped by the 1st Air Depot. The depot supplied airplanes, flying personnel, transport and drivers, munitions and armament, radio and photographic equipment, medical and enlisted personnel of many capabilities. Once deployed to the front, the 1st Air Depot was responsible for maintaining the unit at effective combat readiness by providing replacements in all of these items and personnel to replace combat losses and the expenditure of supplies and equipment.

== History ==
When the United States entered World War I, the Toul Sector of the Western Front was designated for the American Expeditionary Force (AEF). Colombey-les-Belles, about 11 miles south of the City of Toul, was selected as a location for a depot with a mission to support Air Service Units sent to the Zone of Advance (Western Front) for training and combat service.

=== Establishment ===
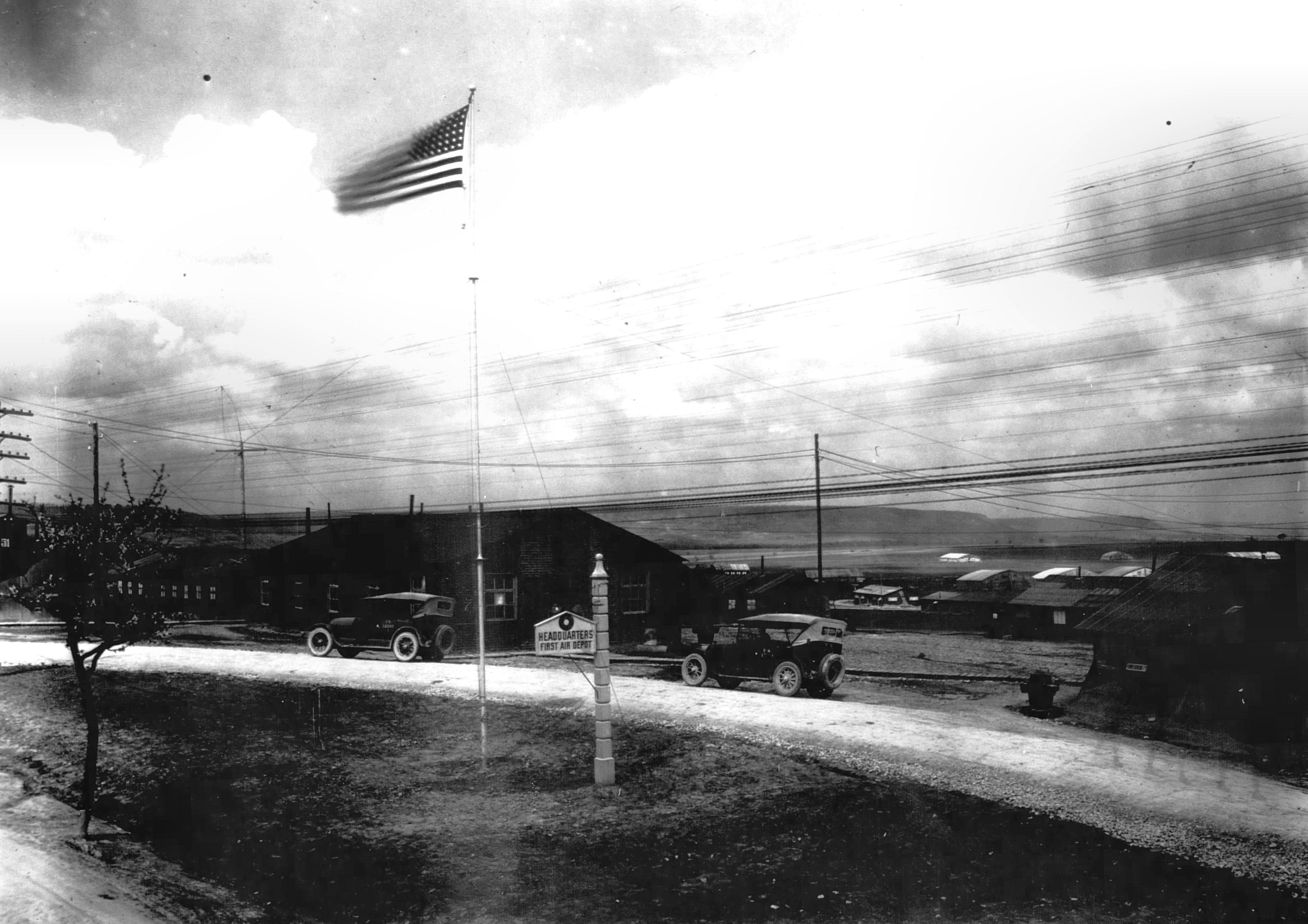
1st Air Depot Headquarters

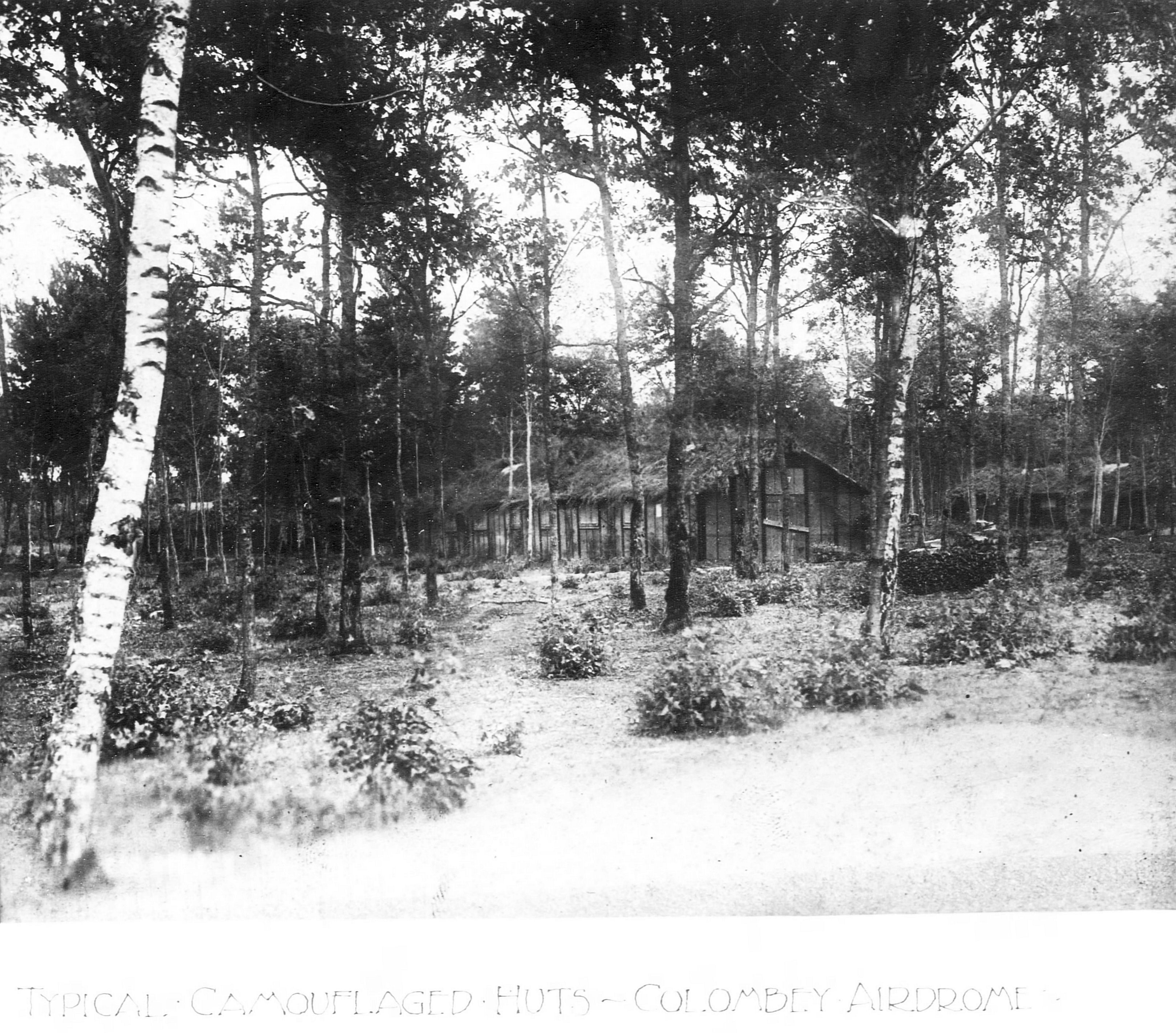
Camouflaged buildings of the 1st Air Depot built in the woods west of the town.

The construction of the 1st Air Depot was begun on 1 November 1917. The first contingent of Air Service troops arrived at Colombey-les-Belles. consisting of one officer and 20 men. For its first three months, the depot consisted of personnel from the 88th, 89th and 90th Aero Squadrons, 7 officers and approximately 450 men.

The construction proceeded through the winter in mostly inclement weather. During this period the flying field construction was begun as well as barracks, buildings and hangars, with the major initial construction being completed on 5 April 1918 when most of the facility was completed. This included facilities for 40 officers and 800 men; barracks and quarters for five squadrons and buildings for storage and office purposes. A standard gauge railroad extending from the Colombey Railroad Station was constructed along with a system of narrow gauge track which connected various warehouses with the main receiving building along with the flying field and various repair shops. Several aircraft hangars were erected and about 50 acres of ground was conditioned for flying operations. By the time of the Armistice in November 1918, the 1st Air Depot consisted of more than 570 acres of land, with 144 buildings consisting of supply warehouses, office buildings and barracks. The flying field had a total of 25 aircraft hangars. The three squadrons later left for combat duty and were replaced by a permanent garrison in March 1918. These being the 637th, 643d, 645th and 463d Aero Squadrons.

Air Raids and Defenses

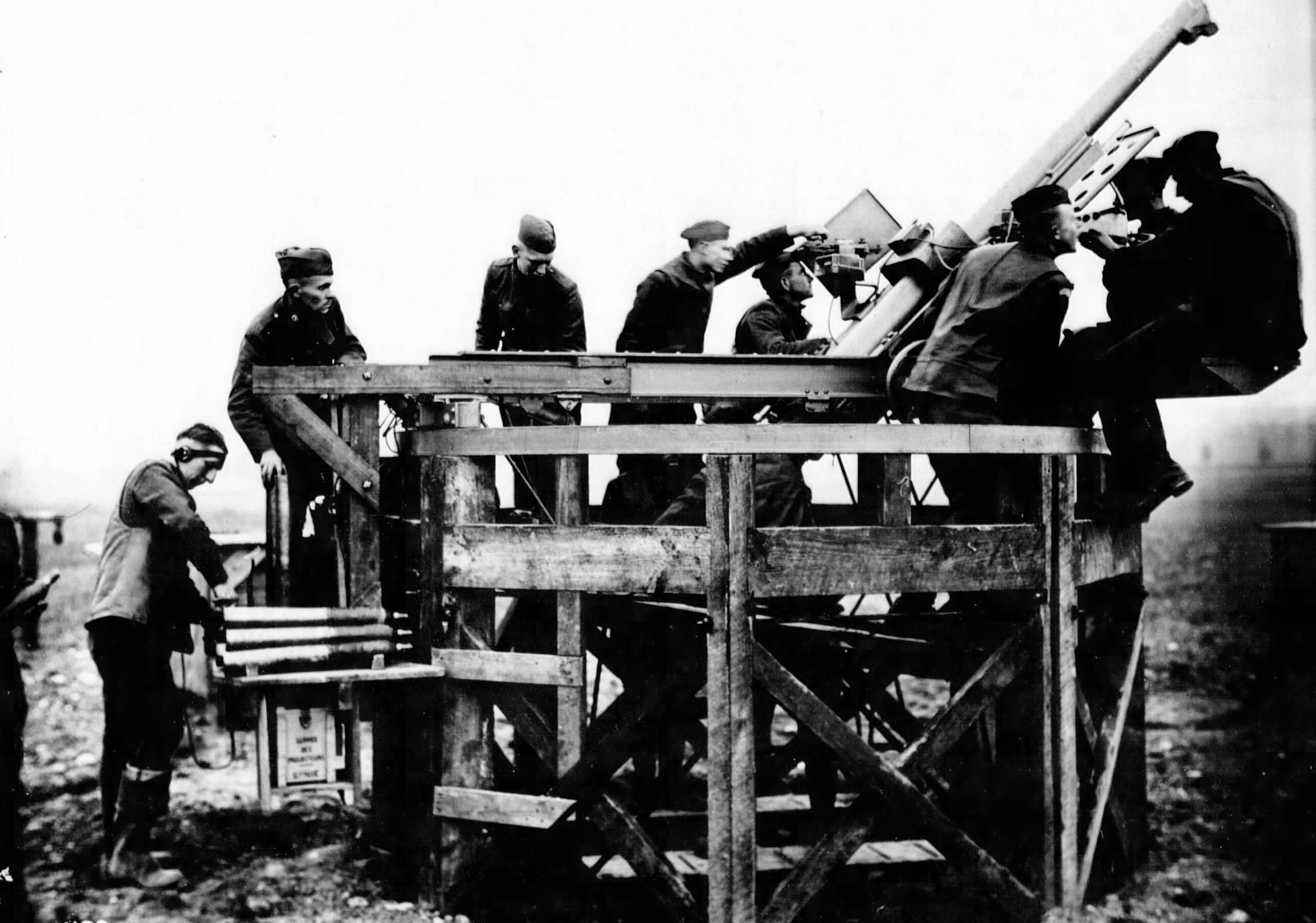
French 75mm Anti Aircraft gun for air defense of the base

Due to its proximity to the front lines, a dispersal plan was set up which placed the majority of buildings in the woods around the flying field. All buildings were camouflaged and set well apart from another in an irregular pattern. During its time in operation, the depot was never attacked by enemy bombing raids, although on several occasions enemy observation aircraft flew over the depot. On three occasions, bombs were dropped on the flying field, but the depot was missed entirely.

Having in mind the proximity of the base to the front, zig-zag trenches were dug near all barracks for the protection of personnel. Also, an anti-aircraft defense was established consisting of four AA batteries. These consisted of 16 75mm guns; 30 machine guns and 6 80-inch searchlights, dispersed at positions surrounding the airfield and depot.

=== Operations ===
To function properly, six principal departments were established at the Depot: Transportation; Advance Supply; Quartermaster; Machine Shops; Aircraft Repair and Aircraft Acceptance and Replacement. Other departments of secondary importance were Construction; Post Supply; Air Service Dispursing and Medical.

Transportation Department

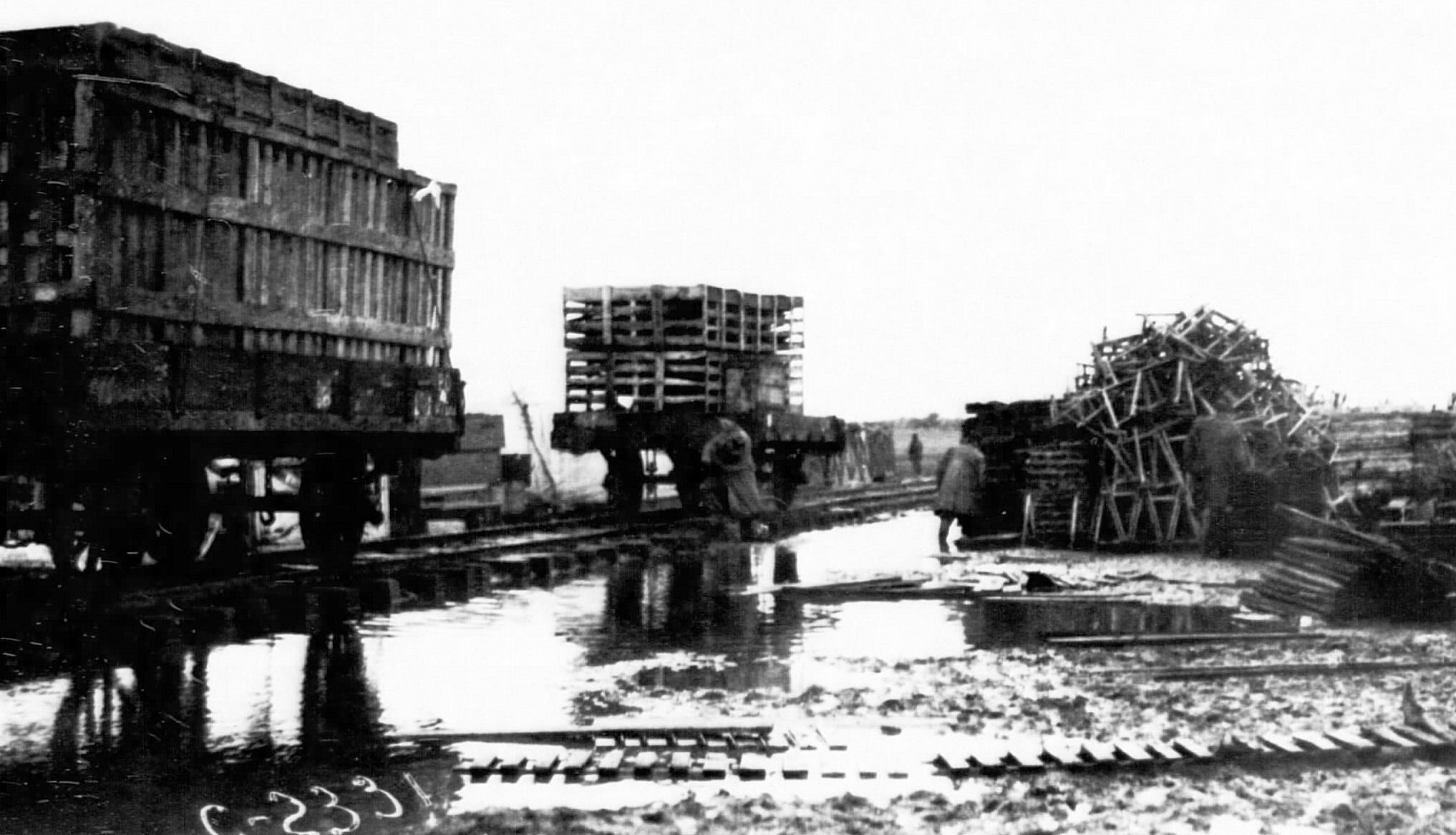
Truck Supply Convoy

This consisted of Railway and Motor Transportation. The Rail Transportation mission was the receipt of supplies arriving at the Depot and keeping records of items received and other particulars; unloading the cars and also loading the cars for outgoing shipments. The mission of the Motor Transportation unit was to deliver supplies and equipment from the Depot to the combat squadrons at the front, and other services as demands required, such as the movement of troops. All this transportation was kept in repair by the Depot by Air Service Personnel by men trained in the United States for special duty with transportation and logistics. Truck convoys to the front were operated in groups of 10 trucks each, this was found to be the best and most efficient use of the vehicles.

The work performed by the Transportation Department varied widely. Supply trains were constantly traveling between depots in the rear and Colombey, bringing up supplies. Trains were also constantly arriving with gasoline and oil for delivery to the front. Pre-manufactured Hangars and barracks were being shipped along with supplies of all kinds. Also officers from Headquarters would arrive on trains and from Colombey would proceed to advance airfields in automobiles, demanded special cars to be provided.

Advance Supply

This department received and issued all supplies except airplanes. It primarily handled aircraft engines, propellers, spare parts of all kinds, the hardware fasteners, mechanics tools, aircraft instruments, aviation clothing, photographic supplies, radio supplies and equipment and all kinds of oils and gasoline. Due to the wide variety of aircraft flown at the front, a great number of spare parts were required to be kept in stock. In addition to the requirements of the combat squadrons, the Department had to take care of the various Departments of the 1st Air Depot.

During the Meuse Argonne Campaign, this department was supplying twenty-three Headquarters Groups, sixteen Observation Squadrons; four Bombardment Squadrons; twenty Pursuit Squadrons; twelve Air Park Squadrons; eight Photo Sections, and 22 Balloon Companies. On the first day of the offensive, for example, one Pursuit Group called for, and received, 26 replacement propellers.

Quartermaster

The Quartermaster Department was responsible for property administration, food provisioning, finance, local purchasing and salvage. It supported 168 Air Service Units and attached organizations, such as communications battalions, anti-aircraft batteries, ordinance and medical detachments. Basically, if the item needed by the squadrons was not related to aircraft support, it was provided by the Quartermaster Department. Food rations were provided only to squadrons located in the immediate territory of the 1st Air Depot. Approximately 60,000 rations were issued on a ten-day average. Arrangements were made with the bakery company for bread and the refrigerator company at Toul for fresh frozen beef.

The Quartermaster Department also operated a Sales Commissary that attempted to carry a full line of personnel items, along with recreational items, cigarettes, newspapers and magazines. However at various times, the stock was found to be quite low due to the fact that the Depot was close to the front lines and this type of supplies carried a lower priority than items necessary to support the combat units.

Aircraft Repair

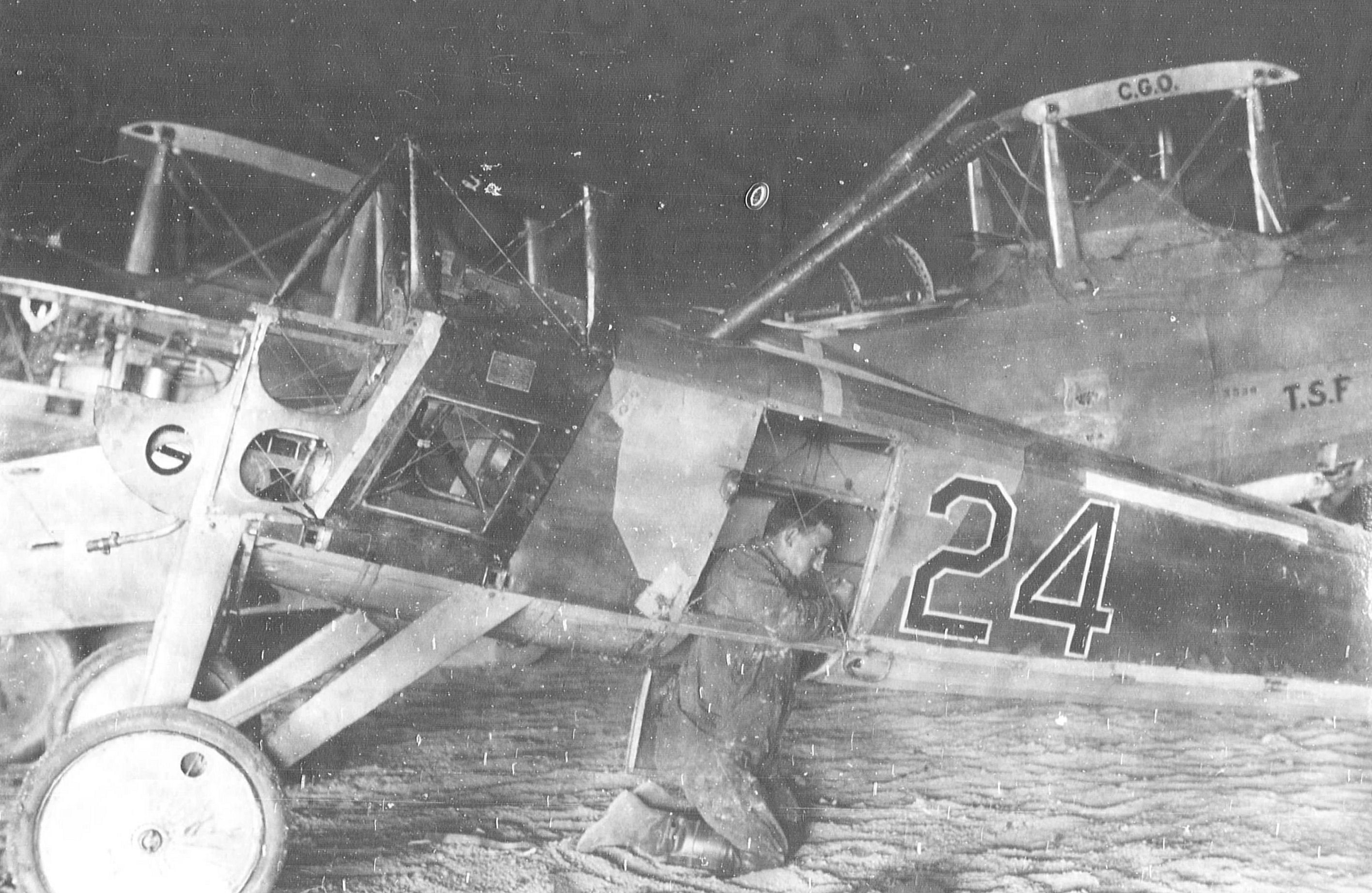
Aircraft Salvage Shop

The function of this department was to salvage, reclaim and repair crashed airplanes retrieved from the front. All aircraft engine installation was done by this department, however, engines salvaged from crashed aircraft were turned over to the Engine Overhaul Shop, The 675th Aero Squadron (Repair) was organized at this department. When a plane was damaged in combat, or would crash on our side of the front line, a crew would be sent from the 1st Air Depot to dismantle the plane and bring it back to be repaired, if possible, or to be added to the salvage pile where it could be cannibalized for usable parts. The territory covered by the salvage crews was the entire length of the American Sector. When it is considered that less than 2,000 aircraft were delivered to the combat squadrons and 1,125 were brought back to the depot for repairs or to be salvaged, the scope of work of the depot's mission was an important and busy one.

During September 1918, which saw both the St. Mihiel and Muese-Argonne Offensives, the work of this department was increased due to the number of damaged and crashed airplanes. Subsequently, and advance Air Depot was established at Behonne to serve the squadrons. Seven complete salvaging crews were sent from Colombey to Behonne to handle the salvaged planes that were brought there. By the time of the Armistice in November, there were 566 aircraft at the Depot, 417 being serviced and repaired. The large number of planes on hand at the time of the Armistice calls attention to the work of the salvage and repair units which was one of the most important functions of the depot.

Aircraft Acceptance and Replacement

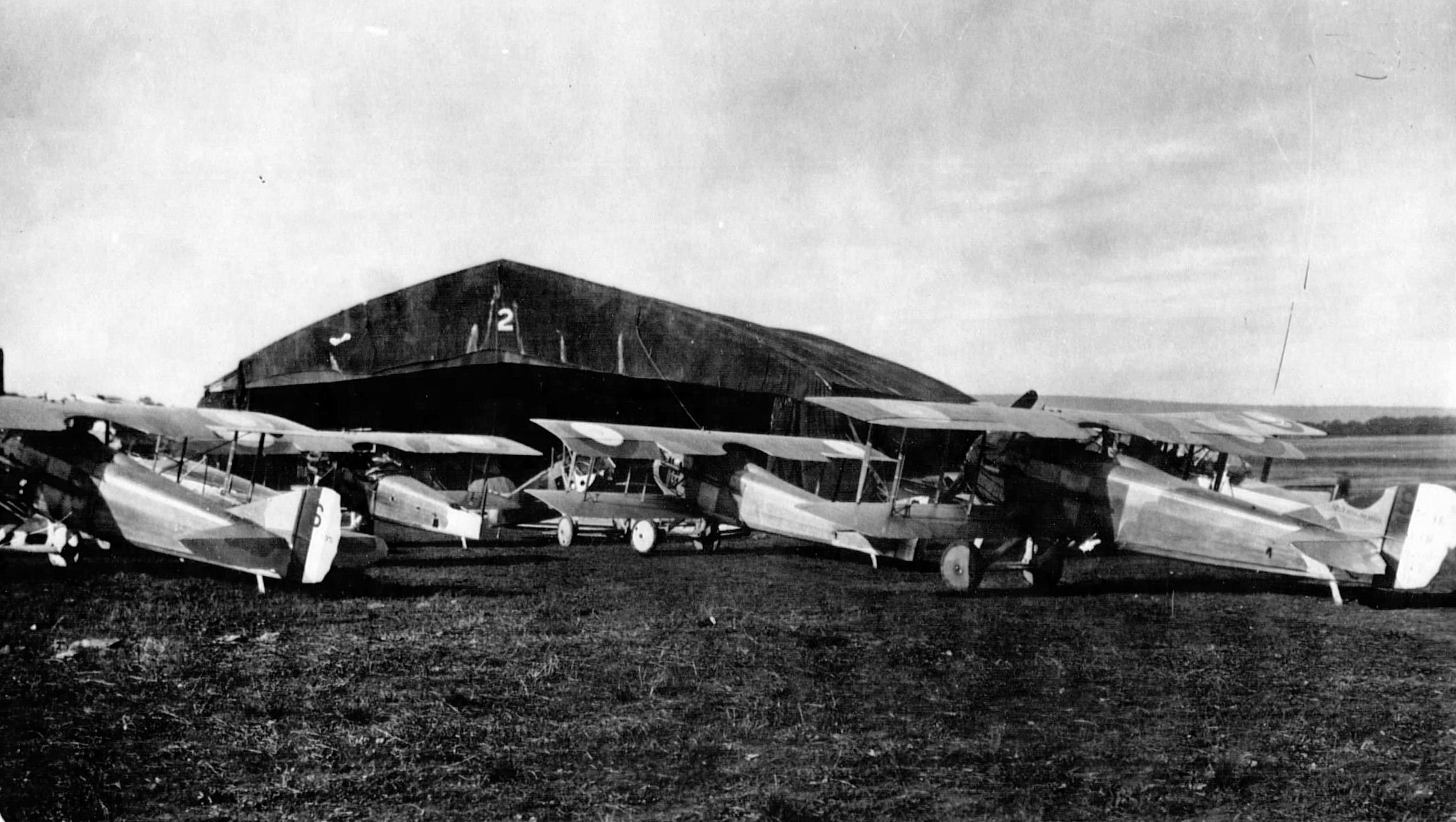
Various SPAD aircraft on the flying field

The 1st Air Depot supplied all combat aircraft to the squadrons on the front lines. This included the initial allocation of aircraft for new units arriving at the front, along with replacement aircraft as necessary to keep the unit combat ready and operational. The aircraft were principally French SPAD, Salmson and Breguet. Also British Sopwith Camels along with Royal Aircraft Factory S.E.5. Also, United States built Dayton-Wright DH-4s with Liberty Engines were also received.

Aircraft were ferried to the depot by air, being flown by pilots from the American Air Service Acceptance Park at Orly Aerodrome, Paris; the Air Service Production Center at Romorantin Aerodrome or other sources of supply. The first aircraft to arrive were four Sopwith 2B2 bombers which arrived on 22 March 1918. These were followed by twelve more Sopwiths the next day. During the first week of April, these planes were delivered to the 90th Aero Squadron. This marked the first delivery of combat aircraft by the Depot. The first American-built Dayton-Wright DH-4 with a Liberty Engine arrived on 3 July, being delivered to the front in early August. The first actual flight of an American built plane was on 7 August. By 20 October, the 1,000th aircraft had arrived at Colombey.

By the time the armistice was signed, the depot had received 1,993 aircraft, given each of them an inspection and prepared them with the necessities for combat service. On 11 November, 149 aircraft were at Colombey undergoing inspection and being prepared for delivery.

Machine and Engine Shops

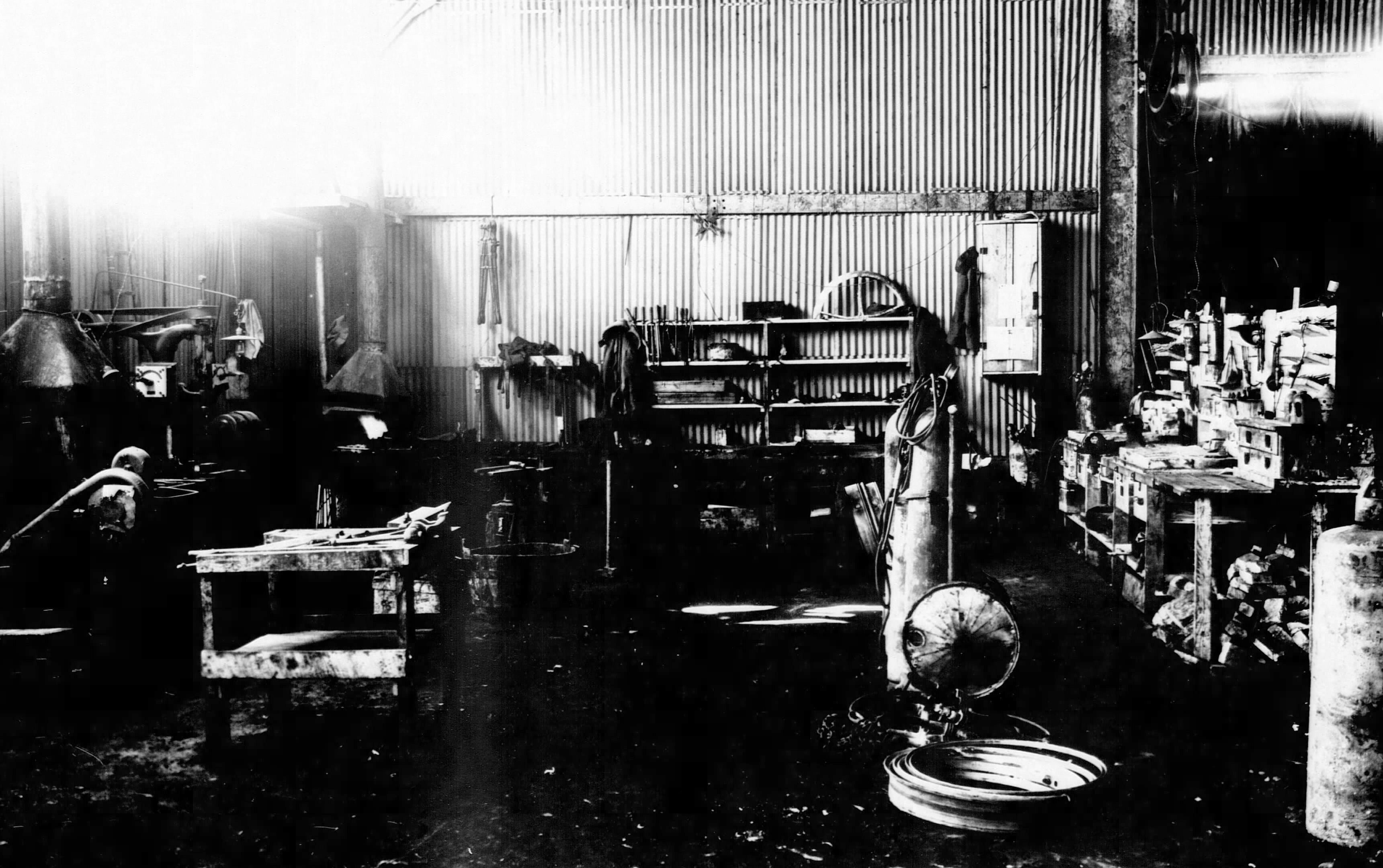
Machine Shop of the 1st Air Depot

These shops performed all kinds of repair work required to keep aircraft at the depot airworthy and capable for combat operations. The work was performed by the 675th Aero Squadron (Repair). The Machine Shop consisted of various tools and lathes necessary. Some jobs were small and performed quickly, others required many weeks for completion for any task necessary other than the manufacture of aircraft parts, which were reserved to the manufactures of the aircraft.

The Engine Overhaul Shop was established to overhaul and repair engines of squadron aircraft operating at the front. The average aircraft engine in use required dis assembly and overhaul after about 25 to 30 hours of actual service. The facilities did not exist at the forward combat airfields for this maintenance, and a constant transport of engines to and from the squadrons was necessary by truck to keep serviceable engines in the aircraft. During six months of actual operations, the Depot received an average of 10 freight cars and 20 trucks a day of supplies and replacement parts, which were also sent forward to the combat units.

Other functions

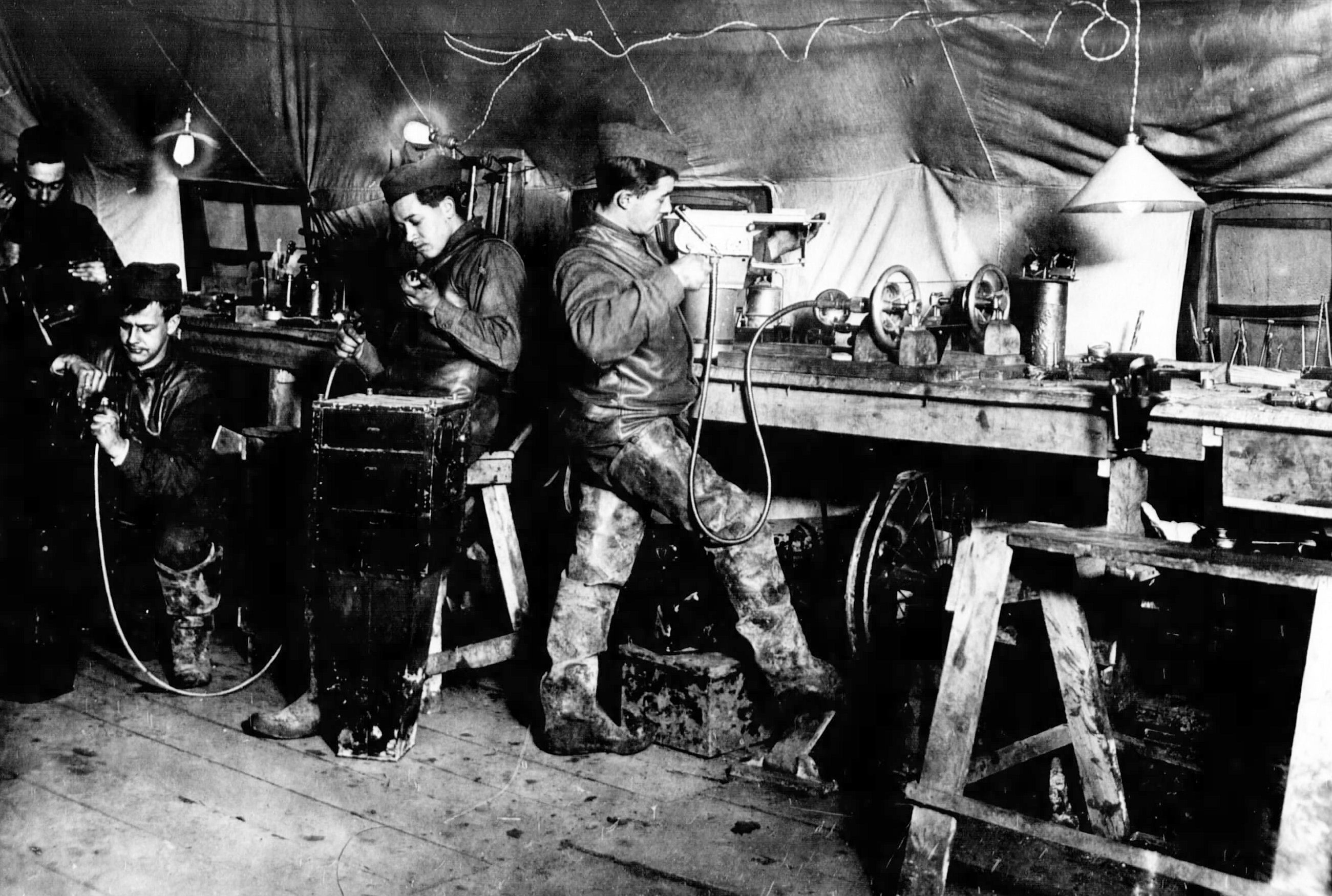
Camera Shop

A procurement office (Dispursing) was established for the mission of enabling purchases of various supplies from the local French economy. Many supplies had to be purchased in this manner due to the inability of the Supply Section to keep on hand for issue everything required. This included the payment of all personnel for their duties with the Air Service. Balloon Supplies were furnished primarily with purchases from the French. The Radio and Photography shops maintained aircraft radio equipment and observation cameras.

In addition to the aircraft and supply functions of the Depot, all pilots, observers and ground support personnel assigned to the front were first ordered to report to the 1st Air Depot to receive their personal equipment. Once equipped, they would be assigned to squadrons in need of replacement personnel. By the time of the Armistice, 1,531 officers had been processed by the Depot: 712 pilots, 632 observers and 177 ground officers.

=== Post-Armistice ===
After the Armistice was signed, the 1st Air Depot was designated as the demobilization point for all Air Service units in the Zone of Advance (Western Front). At that time, it consisted of 48 Combat Aero Squadrons; 45 Service Squadrons; 23 Balloon Companies; 4 Photographic Sections; 5 Headquarters organizations and 12 Air Park Squadrons, outside of the depot organizations proper.

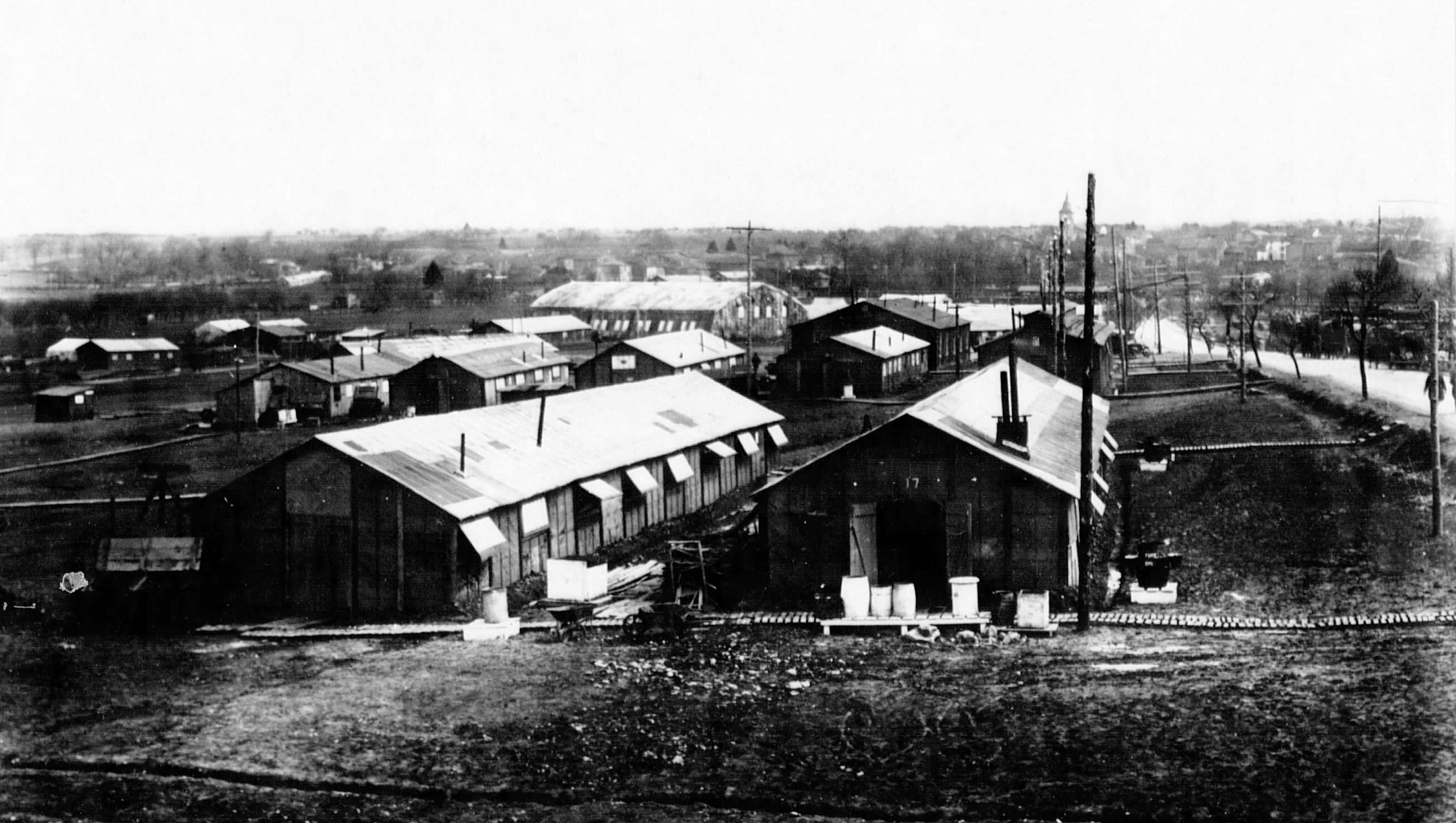
Various support buildings (photo taken after the Armistice)

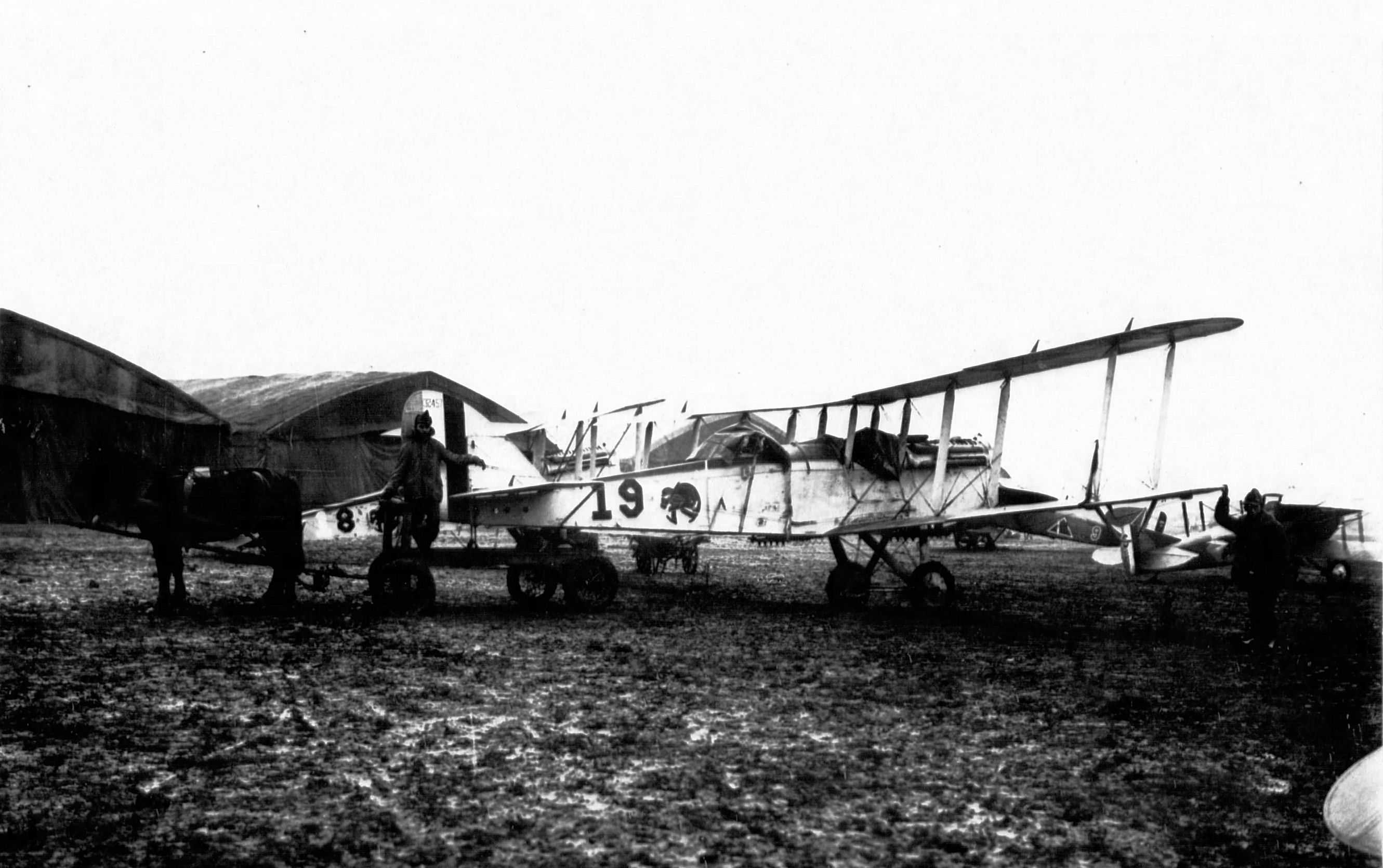
DH-4 turned in for subsequent processing

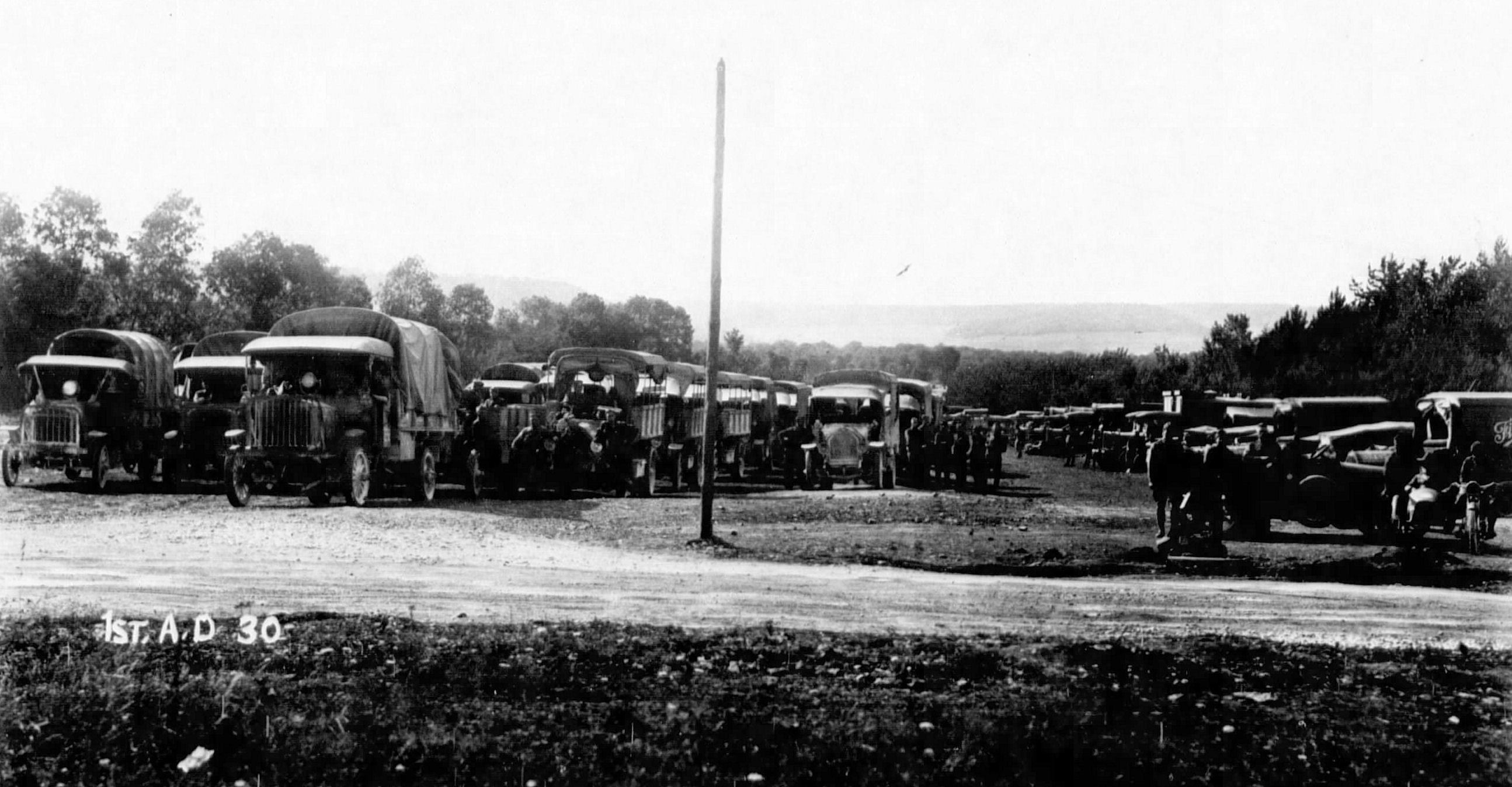
Truck storage

The process of demobilization meant the squadron would fly its aircraft and bring its personnel by truck from its forward combat airfield to Colombey to be stripped of all war equipment. An Observation Squadron had a full complement of 45 officers, and a Pursuit Squadron 25. The usual number to accompany a squadron back to the United States was nine, the remainder of the officers being released and ordered to the United States as casual individuals.

Aircraft were stripped of their guns by the Ordnance Department; their radio equipment by that department, the trucks being turned over to the Motor Transport Corps, and all other combat equipment sorted and stored at the depot. Due to the large number of units being processed, it became necessary to erect many more hangars to take care of the planes being delivered by the squadrons. Also, a sufficient number of planes were kept in operational condition to supply those units still in the field and also to the Third Army Air Service, on occupation duty in the Rhineland. Once the aircraft had their guns, cameras, radios and other supplemental equipment removed, the French and English aircraft were ferried to Orly Aerodrome so they could be stricken off record and returned to their host countries. The United States DH-4 built aircraft were sent to Romomartin for final disposition.

It was found that the process of demobilization of a unit took about 48 hours to receive and strip a squadron and have it ready for transport to one of the base ports for embarkation back to the United States. The overwhelming number of personnel outstripped the capability to transport units home, and the vast majority of units were ordered to proceed to transient camps where personnel waited for a ship to board and go back to the United States.

In addition to this duty, the 1st Air Depot was called upon to dismantle the combat airfields on the front. This meant about 100 fields were to be dismantled, either by turning them over to the French or by removing all structures on them, collecting all equipment and supplies left at them, and turning over the land to the French Government so the original owners could use it for peaceful uses. Until April 1919, the Air Service kept 25 combat squadrons, 13 Balloon Companies and other necessary units in the field. This was reduced to 14 Squadrons and 10 Balloon companies of the Third Army Air Service by the end of April when all units in France were ordered demobilized. The last American Air Service units in France were processed by the Depot on 3 May.

The entire Third Army Air Service, excepting that of the III Corps 138th Aero Squadron, one air park, and one construction squadron, were relieved from further duty with the Third Army on 12 May 1919 and ordered to proceed to the 1st Air Depot for demobilization. The 138th was reassigned to Air Service HQ and took over the courier and liaison duties of the Third Army until the entire Third Army Air Service Headquarters itself was demobilized on 2 July 1919.

=== Subsequent history ===
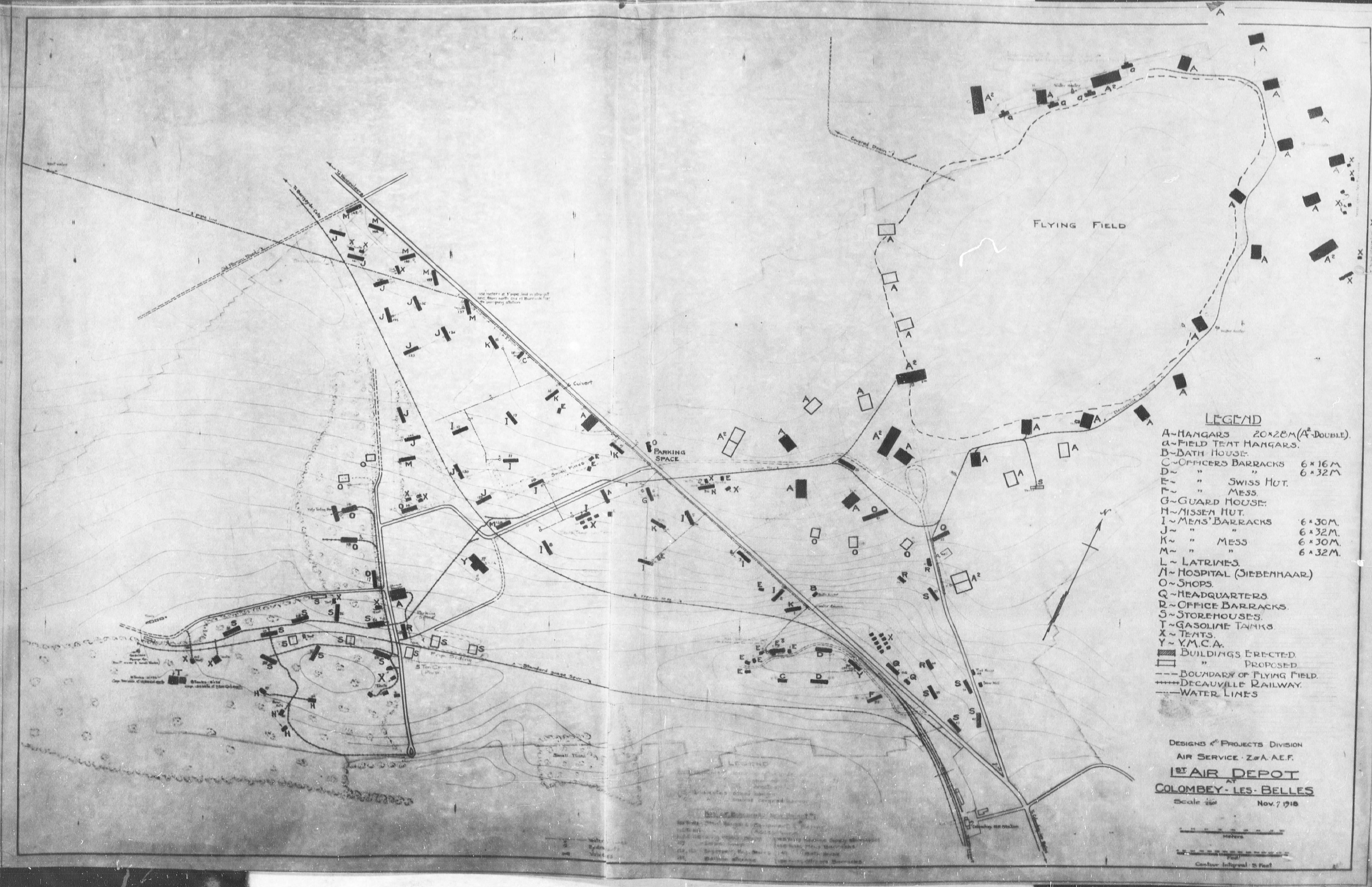
Map of the 1st Air Depot and Colombey-les-Belles Aerodrome. Most of the roads and locations of the infrastructure of the facility can be found on modern-day Google Map of the area. (Click on the map for high resolution)

The last mission of the 1st Air Depot was the dismantlement of Colombey-les-Belles Aerodrome. During the summer of 1919, as its mission would down, buildings were taken down, hangars dismantled, stocks of equipment disposed of and the 1st Air Depot itself demobilized during July, its last personnel leaving for the United States by the end of the month.

Today, both the depot as well as the airfield is a series of fields in agricultural use. Some wooded areas remain and have grown themselves in, leaving no visible evidence of its use as a major military depot. The depot was located to the west of the town of Colombey-les-Belles, along the Départmental 4 (D4), which itself was the main street of the depot. The airfield was located to the northwest of the town, again is now all agricultural fields with some development of new roads, including the A31 autoroute dissecting it.

== See also ==
- List of Air Service American Expeditionary Force aerodromes in France
